= Wave Hill (disambiguation) =

Wave Hill is an estate and garden in New York.

Wave Hill may also refer to:

- Kalkarindji, formerly known as Wave Hill Welfare Settlement, a community in Australia
- Wave Hill Station, a pastoral lease in Australia.
  - Wave Hill walk-off, a 1966 strike at Wave Hill Station
