= Maurice Jupurrurla Luther =

Australian Warlpiri teacher (c. 1945–1985)

Maurice Jupurrurla Luther MBE (c. 1945 – 28 September 1985) was a Warlpiri school teacher, bilingual education advocate, artist and community leader in the community of Lajamanu in the Northern Territory of Australia.

== Life in the Northern Territory ==
Luther was born on Warlpiri Country, in the tribal area Warnayaka, in the Tanami Desert and he was the son of Jajirdi Jakamarra and Yirdiparnta (May) Napaljarri. Luther had no contact with kardiya (white people) until he was 8 years-old and he and his family travelled to The Granites, a gold mining area, and he later recalled being frightened and said that; "I thought their skin was turned inside out!".

After spending some time there his family walked to Yuendumu Native Settlement, at what is now known as Yuendumu, which was operating as a government ration depot for Aboriginal people with the involvement of the Australian Baptist Home Mission. While at Yuendumu Luther's father died and his mother's second husband Jumbo (Sambo) Jakamarra, later known as Sambo No. 1, took work with Francis McGarry at The Granites and the family returned there. However, soon after that (in around 1953) the family were removed from there in a truck by the Native Affairs Branch who wanted them to remain at the government settlement.

At Yuendumu he attended school and received religious instruction from the Reverend Tom Fleming, who was the resident missionary and Baptist pastor. He finished his schooling in 1958 when he was a part of a group taken to Hooker Creek Native Settlement, which is now known as Lajamanu, many Warlpiri people were relocated there due to overcrowding and conflict at Yuendumu. Soon after this move he went through tribal initiation.

He soon left the settlement and took on various roles as a stockman and drover; including a period spent at Wave Hill Station where he was the youngest drover. He recalls 'good' treatment at Wave Hill and said that one of his first roles there was moving horses down to Mistake Creek and the Ord River and return with calves to Helen Springs Station. In 1961 he returned to Hooker Creek where he performed various roles around the settlement, this included work in the garage, carpentry shop, community office and as a handyman. He said of this of his treatment there:

The superintendent used to line up the people in the morning, like in an army camp, men across here, children in the front, women across the back … Everybody had to shave, everybody had to have short hair, everybody had to have clean clothes, everybody had to wear shoes. All the workers in the settlement were trained ‘Army style’ and they had to March! March with their heads up and arms straight and legs moving in time. If we didn’t do it properly we had to get back to the parade and line up again … We were nothing to [the superintendent] we just had to obey. We were just like toy soldiers on a table he could play around with

— Maurice Jupurrurla Luther, Stories from Lajamanu (1984), p 12

From the early 1960s Luther joined the village council at Hooker Creek and became an active participant in community activities. Then, in 1963, he was one of 20 Aboriginal people from across the Northern Territory to be selected for a six week long intensive teacher training in Darwin and used these skills and qualifications when working as a teaching assistant at Hooker Creek School. While working at the school Luther also became involved in bilingual literacy, bilingual education and linguistic work more generally.

On 1 October 1964 Luther was baptised in the Baptist faith and it is around this period that he adopted the use of the surname Luther due to his admiration for Martin Luther King Jr.

From the early 1960s until 1976 Luther worked with linguist Lothar Jagst who was working to prepare a Warlpiri language bible. When Jagst, who had been given the skin name Jakamarra, died in 1976 he felt his loss keenly and said of him:

Thinking about him I am telling this about Jakamarra, the one buried at Jilpirli. We buried him at Jilpirli, our sacred place. I called him friend and father. He took care of my old people. He would take them hunting and camping. Because of that I think of him in my mind. My Warlpiri language he started to speak and put on paper. He would have put God's word on paper in my language. I will always remember how really good Jakamarra was. My Warlpiri people remember him in their minds and hearts. He showed us Father God and his son Jesus. We will always remember him and talk about the one Jipirli.

— Maurice Jupurrurla Luther [also available in the original Warlpiri], as quoted in 'Papers in Warlpiri grammar : in memory of Lothar Jagst' (1982), viii

Luther's work with Jagst was later used in the production of the Warlpiri Encyclopedic Dictionary (2022) where Luther is attributed with developing the spelling system.

In 1970 Luther became one of 12 men on Hooker Creek's first elected Council and in 1973 became a community advisor and, from 1974 to 1979, the executive officer of the council. In 1976 he was appointed the Hiatt Committee of Inquiry into the role of the National Aboriginal Consultative Committee; this was a national committee.

Luther was present when, on 16 August 1975, Gough Whitlam made the handover of Daguragu (Wattie Creek) to the Gurindji people following the Wave Hill walk-off. He was present as the Gurindji are the traditional owners of Hooker Creek and Luther was key to the negotiations for Warlpiri people to be able to remain living there. Luther was also instrumental in the decision to rename it Lajamanu in September 1977. The name Lajamanu is derived from the local Gurindji placename.

Luther continued to be a strong advocate for Warlpiri culture and traditions and was involved in several more organisations, including an appointment to the Australia Council's Aboriginal Arts Board in 1981. As a part of this role, in July 1981, he led a group of 12 Warlpiri men from Lajamanu on a tour of the United States as a part of the "Aboriginal Artists of Australia, tour of USA" and they visited Los Angeles, Washington, D.C., Philadelphia, New York and San Francisco. In 1983 he also travelled to Paris where he, and several other Walpiri men, spent several days creating Rock Python Dreaming at Jurntu at the Musée d’Art Moderne de Paris. This was a 12 x 12 metre ground painting, using ochre and sand, that they used to create a performative installation, including dance, to articulate their culture.

Luther died on 28 September 1985 at Lajamanu.

== Awards ==
- In 1976 Luther was award the Queen's Silver Jubilee Medal.
- In 1978 he was made a Member of the Order of the British Empire.

== Publications ==
In 1975 Luther worked on a series of books, Nyampu pakarli pijakurlu, jarukurlu, for the Summer Institute of Linguists Australian Aborigines Branch where he dictated stories many of the stories in Warlpiri for publication with English translations provided.

Full-text is available for Luther's contributions in these publications through Library & Archives NT:

- Nyampu pakarli pijakurlu, jarukurlu 1 by Maurice Jupurrula Luther (1975).
- Nyampu pakarli pijakurlu, jarukurlu 2 by Maurice Jupurrula Luther (1975).
- Nyampu pakarli pijakurlu, jarukurlu 3 by Maurice Jupurrula Luther (1975).
- Nyampu pakarli pijakurlu, jarukurlu 4 by Maurice Jupurrula Luther (1975).
- Nyampu pakarli pijakurlu, jarukurlu 5 by Maurice Jupurrula Luther (1975).
- Nyampu pakarli pijakurlu, jarukurlu 6 by Maurice Jupurrula Luther (1975).
- Nyampu pakarli pijakurlu, jarukurlu 8 by Maurice Jupurrula Luther (1975).

An oral history interview with Luther, made between 1975 and 1979, is available through AIATSIS.
