= Nungarrayi =

Nungarrayi can be both a middle name and a surname. Notable people with the name include:

- Alma Nungarrayi Granites, Australian artist
- Bess Nungarrayi Price (born 1960), Australian activist and politician
- Lily Nungarrayi Yirringali Jurrah Hargraves (1930–2018), Australian artist
- Doris Bush Nungarrayi (born c. 1942), Australian painter
