= Kalkgurung Airport =

Airport serving Daguragu and Kalkarindji, Australia

- IATA: KFG; ICAO: YKKG

Summary
- Airport type: Public
- Operator: Daguragu Community Council Inc.
- Serves: Daguragu/Kalkarindji
- Location: Daguragu
- Elevation AMSL: 647 ft / 197 m
- Coordinates: 17°25′55″S 130°48′29″E

Map
- Location in the Northern Territory

Runways
Direction	Length		Surface
Direction	m	ft	Surface
03/21	1,250	4,101	Sealed
13/31	926	3,038	Gravel
- Sources: Australian AIP and aerodrome chart

Kalkgurung Airport (IATA: KFG, ICAO: YKKG) is an airport in the Northern Territory of Australia serving Daguragu and Kalkarindji. The airport is located in Daguragu, 2 nautical miles (3.7 km; 2.3 mi) west northwest of the Wave Hill (Kalkarindji) police station.

== See also ==
- List of airports in the Northern Territory
