= Lajamanu, Northern Territory =

Lajamanu
- Town
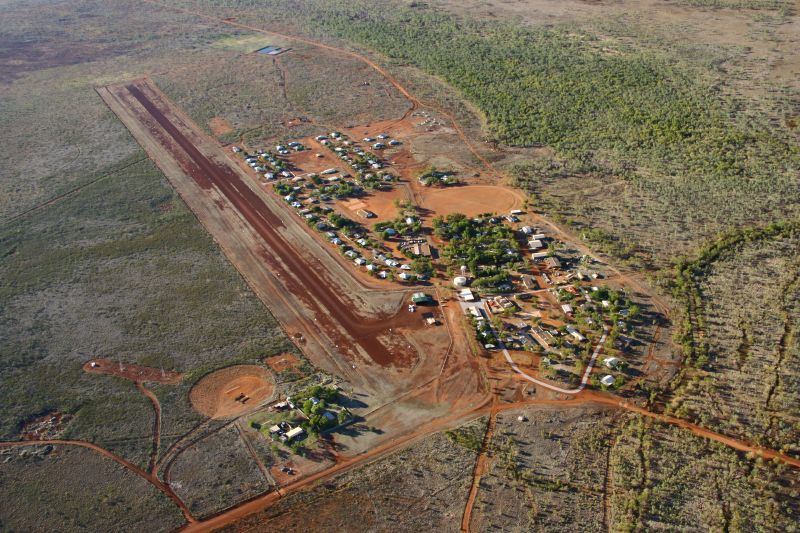
- Aerial view of Lajamanu and its airstrip

- Coordinates: 18°20′09″S 130°38′18″E
- Country: Australia
- State: Northern Territory

Government
  - Territory electorate: Gwoja
  - Federal division: Lingiari
- Elevation (airport): 316 m (1,037 ft)

Population
  - Total: 655 (2021 census)
- Time zone: UTC+9:30 (ACST)
- Mean max temp: 33.8 °C (92.8 °F)
- Mean min temp: 18.1 °C (64.6 °F)
- Annual rainfall: 501.3 mm (19.74 in)
Localities around Lajamanu
Gurindji	Gurindji	Gurindji
Gurindji	Lajamanu	Gurindji
Gurindji	Gurindji	Gurindji

Lajamanu, formerly known as Hooker Creek Native Settlement or just Hooker Creek, is a small town of the Northern Territory of Australia. It is located around 560 km (350 mi) from Katherine and approximately 890 km (550 mi) from Darwin. At the 2021 Australian census, Lajamanu had a population of 655, of whom 92.4 percent are of Aboriginal and/or Torres Strait Islander origin, chiefly Warlpiri people.

== History ==
Lajamanu was established in 1949, on the site of the former Hooker Creek station. The government moved Walpiri people from Yuendumu, only succeeding on the fourth attempt, after people had simply walked back their own communities on the first three attempts. In the 1950s it was known as the Hooker Creek Native Settlement.

There was a village council in the 1960s (possibly earlier). In 1970, a council of twelve men was elected, including Maurice Jupurrurla Luther MBE, who had been taken to Hooker Creek from Yuendumu in 1958. In 1976 he was appointed to a committee of four people to inquire into the role of the National Aboriginal Consultative Committee. After the Gurindji strike and handover of Wattie Creek to the Gurindji people by Prime Minister Gough Whitlam, Luther was an important figure in negotiations to allow the Warlpiri people to continue living at Lajamanu, the Gurindji being the traditional owners of the area. He also played a large part in the decision to rename the place Lajamanu, which is derived from a nearby Gurindji place name.

In November 2021 the community was put into lockdown by the Northern Territory Government, as a wave of infections hit the Katherine region during the COVID-19 pandemic in Australia. The first COVID-19 case in Lajamanu was recorded on 1 December, a day after the lockdown orders were changed to that of a lockout.

== Location and access ==
Lajamanu is located around 560 km (350 mi) south-west of Katherine and approximately 890 km (550 mi) from Darwin. The nearest community is Daguragu, about 110 km (68 mi) away. Lajamanu is difficult to access, mainly due to the distance from major cities and towns. Road access is via the Victoria Highway, turning off after 120 km (75 mi)) onto the Buntine Highway for a further 323 km (201 mi), and then 104 to Lajamanu (a dirt but well-formed road).

Hooker Creek Airport has a sealed airstrip, and is serviced by chartered flights, the Royal Australian Air Force and the Royal Flying Doctor Service service.

== Government ==
The town is a strongly traditional community, and is governed by the Central Land Council (Region 3, Northwest) as well as the Lajamanu Kurdiji group, a group of senior men and women of the community who promote respect for Aboriginal and non-Aboriginal law and justice within their community. Kurdiji is a Warlpiri word for "shield", with the connotations of protecting or warding off.

The Lajamanu Council was the first community government council established in the Northern Territory, in 1980. It is a strongly traditional Warlpiri community, and the council follows the lead of the local people's council. It is a dry (alcohol-free) community.

== Demographics ==
At the 2021 Australian census, there were 655 people in Lajamanu, of whom 92.4 percent are Indigenous, mainly Warlpiri. This represents a slight drop in the population since 2006, when there were 669 people.

== Language ==
The majority of Lajamanu residents have Warlpiri as their main heritage language. Lajamanu School was a Warlpiri-English bilingual school from 1982 until 2008 when the Northern Territory Government introduced a policy banning Warlpiri language instruction for the first four hours of every school day. This contributed to a significant drop in attendance at Lajamanu School after 2009. It has been reported that young people now speak "Light Warlpiri" as a first language. Most official business and education is delivered in English.

== Geography and climate ==
Lajamanu is located close to the centre of Australia, which has a hot, dry climate.

In February 2010 and February 2023, media outlets reported that hundreds of live spangled perch (Leiopotherapon unicolor) rained down upon the town. However, this species has exceptionally good dispersal abilities and can migrate via overland flow, leading to its being commonly found scattered on the ground following heavy rain and mistaken reports of having fallen from the sky.

Climate data for Lajamanu Airport, elevation 316 m (1,037 ft), (1998–2020 normals, extremes 1967–present)
Month	Jan	Feb	Mar	Apr	May	Jun	Jul	Aug	Sep	Oct	Nov	Dec	Year
Record high °C (°F)	46.2 (115.2)	45.5 (113.9)	44.1 (111.4)	40.7 (105.3)	38.8 (101.8)	36.6 (97.9)	35.4 (95.7)	37.9 (100.2)	41.5 (106.7)	43.6 (110.5)	44.8 (112.6)	46.6 (115.9)	46.6 (115.9)
Mean daily maximum °C (°F)	37.4 (99.3)	36.6 (97.9)	35.7 (96.3)	34.3 (93.7)	29.9 (85.8)	26.8 (80.2)	27.5 (81.5)	29.8 (85.6)	35.1 (95.2)	37.6 (99.7)	38.8 (101.8)	38.3 (100.9)	34.0 (93.2)
Mean daily minimum °C (°F)	24.2 (75.6)	23.6 (74.5)	22.5 (72.5)	18.5 (65.3)	13.6 (56.5)	10.0 (50.0)	9.7 (49.5)	10.8 (51.4)	16.9 (62.4)	20.8 (69.4)	23.5 (74.3)	24.4 (75.9)	18.2 (64.8)
Record low °C (°F)	17.2 (63.0)	16.0 (60.8)	12.9 (55.2)	8.4 (47.1)	2.5 (36.5)	−0.1 (31.8)	0.0 (32.0)	1.5 (34.7)	5.0 (41.0)	9.0 (48.2)	12.4 (54.3)	14.0 (57.2)	−0.1 (31.8)
Average rainfall mm (inches)	178.9 (7.04)	177.6 (6.99)	79.7 (3.14)	20.3 (0.80)	7.7 (0.30)	5.2 (0.20)	2.3 (0.09)	1.0 (0.04)	4.1 (0.16)	21.1 (0.83)	36.2 (1.43)	101.8 (4.01)	635.9 (25.03)
Average rainy days (≥ 1.0 mm)	9.4	9.3	5.5	1.4	1.1	0.6	0.3	0.3	0.6	2.6	4.1	7.9	43.1
Source: Australian Bureau of Meteorology

== Art ==
Warlpiri people have a long history of creating art on wooden artefacts, the body, the ground and rocks. Walpiri art was used for ceremonial and teaching purposes, a feature of art in Lajamanu. Lajamanu artists began using canvas and acrylic paint in 1986 following a traditional paintings course held in the community.

Today, the artists in Lajamanu continue to paint using canvas and acrylic paint at the community's Warnayaka Art Gallery. The Gallery is a Warlpiri corporation and is governed by an entirely Walpiri board. Artists Peggy Rockman Napaljarri, Lily Nungarrayi Yirringali Jurrah Hargraves, Rosie Murnku Marnku Napurrurla Tasman and Molly Napurrurla Tasman have all painted at the gallery.

Other contemporary Indigenous Australian artists from the Lajamanu region include Sheila Brown Napaljarri and Peggy Rockman Napaljarri.

Lajamanu artists have been finalists in the Telstra National Aboriginal and Torres Strait Islander Art Awards in 2008, 2009, 2010 and 2011.

== Notable people ==
- Telaya Blacksmith, athlete
- Maurice Jupurrurla Luther MBE (c.1945–1985), see above
- In 2010, Warlpiri elders in Lajamanu including Bill Bunter, Sharon Anderson and Martin Johnson participated in an ABC TV documentary Bush Law, about the relationship between traditional Warlpiri law and the mainstream Australian justice system.
- Liam Patrick, Australian rules footballer
- Steve Jampijinpa Patrick (also known as Wanta Jampijinpa Pawu-Kurlpurlurnu) is an educator and has also been involved in the Milpirri festival and collaborations with Tracks Dance company. In 2008, Patrick co-authored a research paper, "Ngurra-kurlu: a way of working with Warlpiri people". Wanta worked as an Australian Research Council-funded research fellow at the Australian National University from 2012 to 2014. In 2013, Wanta Jampijinpa wrote and directed the television documentary Milpirri: Winds of Change. The film chronicles Wanta and the Lajamanu elders' vision for making Warlpiri culture relevant to the contemporary world. The film premiered on NITV in November 2013, and has been available on SBS On Demand.

== See also ==
- Raining fish
