= Kalkarindji =

Aboriginal settlement in the Victoria Daly Region, Northern Territory, Australia

Kalkarindji (Aboriginal Community)
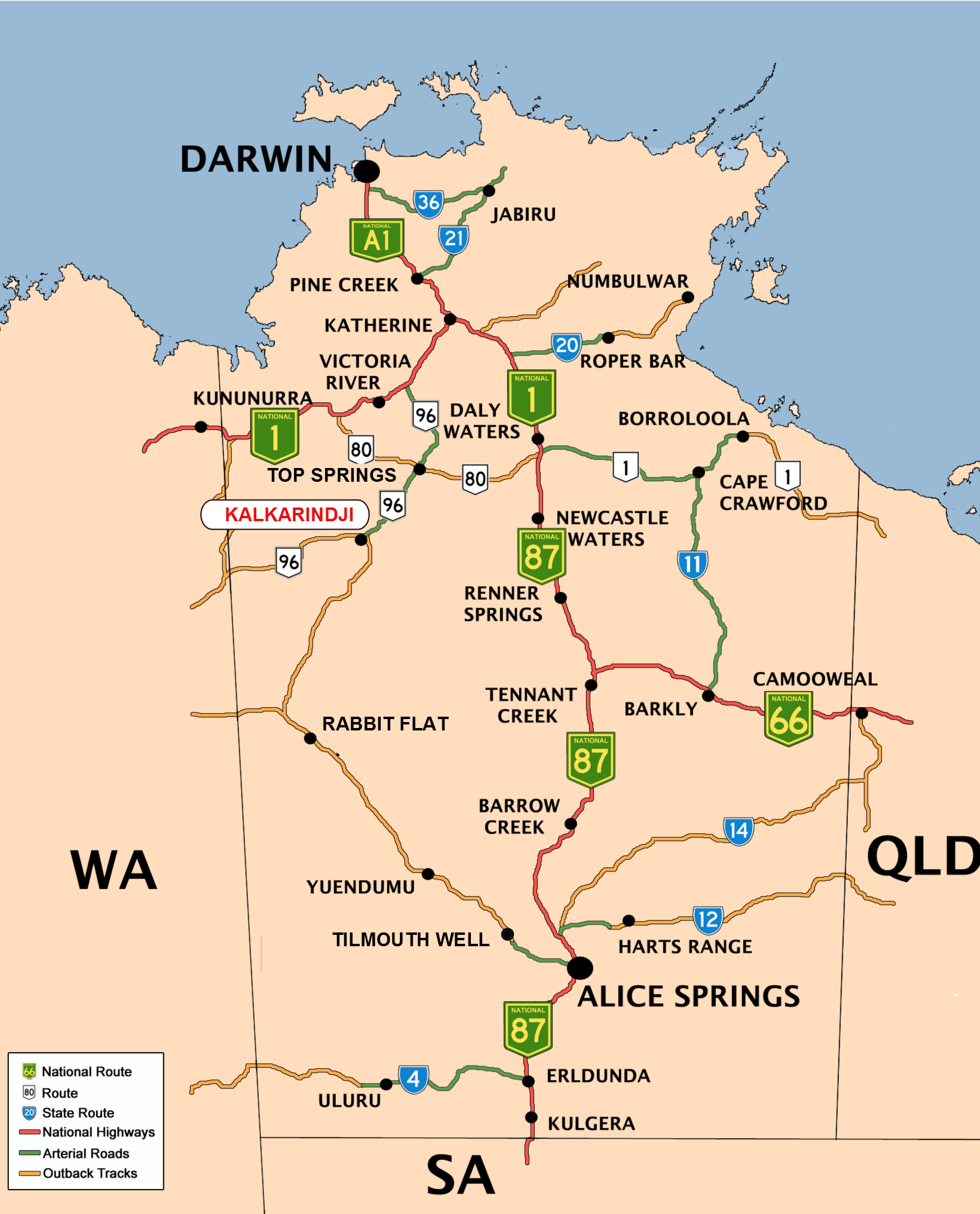
- Map showing location of Kalkarindji in red on white.

- Coordinates: 17°26′54″S 130°49′59″E
- Country: Australia
- State: Northern Territory
- LGA: Victoria Daly Region
- Location: 554 km (344 mi) S of Darwin; 460 km (290 mi) SW of Katherine
- Established: 1972 (community); 5 October 1976 (town); 4 April 2007 (locality)

Government
  - Territory electorate: Gwoja
  - Federal division: Lingiari

Area
  - Total: 6 km^{2} (2.3 sq mi)
- Elevation weather station: 196 m (643 ft)

Population
  - Total: 334 (2016 census)
  - Density: 56/km^{2} (144/sq mi)
- Time zone: UTC+9:30 (ACST)
- Postcode: 0852
- Mean max temp: 34.3 °C (93.7 °F)
- Mean min temp: 19.0 °C (66.2 °F)
- Annual rainfall: 694.8 mm (27.35 in)
Localities around Kalkarindji (Aboriginal Community)
Daguragu	Daguragu; Gurindji	Gurindji
Daguragu; Gurindji	Kalkarindji (Aboriginal Community)	Gurindji
Gurindji	Gurindji	Gurindji
- Locations; Adjoining localities

Kalkarindji (Wave Hill), also known as Kalk, is a town and locality in the Northern Territory of Australia, located on the Buntine Highway about 554 kilometres (344 mi) south of the territory capital of Darwin and located about 460 kilometres (290 mi) south of the municipal seat in Katherine.

== History ==
Kalkarindji and the nearby settlement of Daguragu are the population centres of the land formerly held under the Wave Hill Cattle Station. In 1966, the Aboriginal station workers, led by Vincent Lingiari, staged the Gurindji strike, also known as the Wave Hill Walk Off, in protest against oppressive labour practices and land dispossession. A portion of land was returned to the Gurindji people in by UK-based station owners, the Vestey Group, after negotiations by the Whitlam government in 1975.

Kalkarindji reportedly began in 1972 as the "Wave Hill Aboriginal Township". On 5 October 1976, land was associated with existing settlement was proclaimed under the Northern Territory’s Crown Lands Ordinance as a town named "Kalkaringi". In 1985, the spelling of the town’s name was changed to "Kalkarindji" after a review of the original spelling by tribal elders.

As of 2006, Daguragu Community Government Council provided "municipal and other services to the township and surrounds of Kalkaringi (formerly known as Wave Hill) and to Daguragu, a community settled on land under the Aboriginal Land Rights Act 1976". The total council area was about 3,237 square kilometres (1,250 sq mi). Kalkaringi was within a gazetted township area, with the land being leasehold under the auspices of the Northern Territory Government.

The existing boundaries and name were gazetted by the Northern Territory Government under the Place Names Act on 4 April 2007.

== Heritage sites ==
The Wave Hill walk-off route was listed on the Northern Territory Heritage Register on 23 August 2006 and on the Australian National Heritage List on 9 August 2007. There are also seven other associated sites on the National Heritage List, of which five are in the Kalkaringi area and two within Daguragu.

== Freedom Day ==
The Freedom Day Festival celebrates the Wave Hill walk-off and Gurindji culture each year in Kalkarindji.

== Demographics ==
The 2016 Australian census which was conducted in August 2016 reports that Kalkarindji had 334 people living within its boundaries of which 285 (84.8%) identified as "Aboriginal and/or Torres Strait Islander peoples".

== Geography and flooding ==
Kalkarindji is located on the Buntine Highway, about 554 kilometres (344 mi) south of Darwin and about 480 kilometres (300 mi) south-west of the municipal seat in Katherine.

Kalkarindji is located on the left floodplain of the Victoria River, making it prone to flooding when extreme weather events occur. In February 2001, ex-tropical cyclones Winsome and Wylva caused major flooding, and many properties and roads in Kalkarindji were inundated.

=== 2023 flooding ===
In late February to early March 2023, heavy rains fell over the area, with Kalkarindji recording 134 mm (5.3 in) of rain in the 24 hours to 1 March. The upper Victoria River exceeded major flood levels, standing at 16.99 m (55.7 ft); the major flood stage is 14 m (46 ft). Evacuations were ordered for residents of Daguragu, Kalkarindji, Pigeon Hole, and Palumpa. An emergency was declared for district. First, Daguaragu and Pigeon Hole were fully evacuated to Kalkarindji, whence two aeroplanes of the Australian Defence Force carried evacuees out of Kalkarindji to Katherine. They then travelled by bus to Darwin, to be accommodated at the Centre of National Resilience in Howard Springs. On 7 March it was reported that it could be a month or longer before residents of some communities would be able to return home, as many houses and infrastructure had been so severely damaged by the floodwaters; however, only about half of homes in Kalkarindji had been affected. Around 700 people had been evacuated, while 80 to 100 dogs had been left behind. Contractors later delivered food to the dogs.

Precious artworks and historical artefacts, kept in the art centre, were saved from flood damage by moving them to safe storage.

== Governance ==
Kalkarindji a town and locality in the Northern Territory, located within the federal division of Lingiari, the territory electoral division of Stuart and the local government area of the Victoria Daly Region. The council office for the ward of Kalkarindji/Daguragu is located in Kalkarindji, and is also the service centre for Daguragu, which is 8 kilometres (5.0 mi) north-west of Kalkarindji, adjacent to Wattie Creek.

The Gurindji Aboriginal Corporation is a Registered Native Title Body Corporate (RNTBC) owned by the communities of Kalkaringi and Daguragu, a total of about 700 people of mainly Gurindji, Mudburra and Warlpiri heritage. It oversees a number of community-owned enterprises, such as the Kalkaringi Store and Caravan Park.

Daguragu community is situated on Aboriginal land held under perpetual title.

=== 2020 native title ===
A native title claim was lodged in 2016 by the Central Land Council on behalf of the traditional owners, as there were mining interests in area covered by Wave Hill Station's pastoral lease. On 8 September 2020, the Federal Court of Australia recognised the native title rights of the Gurindji people to 5,000 square kilometres (1,900 sq mi) of the Wave Hill Station, allowing them to receive royalties as compensation from resource companies who explore the area. Justice Richard White said that the determination recognised Indigenous involvement (Jamangku, Japuwuny, Parlakuna-Parkinykarni and Yilyilyimawu peoples) with the land "at least since European settlement and probably for millennia". The court sitting took place nearly 800 kilometres (500 mi) south of Darwin, and descendants of Lingiari and others involved in the walk-off celebrated the determination. The owners will participate in the mining negotiations and exploration work, from which royalties may flow in the future, which may allow people in the Kalkarindji and Daguragu communities to create their own businesses. Just as important is the right to hunt, gather, teach and perform cultural activities and ceremonies, and allow the young people to connect with their land.

== Meat dump dispute ==
There have been several legal disputes between the owners of Kalkarindji Meats, Windbox Pty Ltd, and the Gurindji Aboriginal Corporation as well as the Central Land Council over various matters. In February 2019 it was discovered that there had been pits dug for dumping meat waste within the native title area of Kalkarindji and very near to the heritage-listed Wave Hill track. This continued on and off until September 2020, when both the Northern Territory and Commonwealth governments started an investigation into the matter.

== See also ==
- Kalkurung Airport
