= YHOO =

YHOO may refer to:

- Yahoo! Inc. (1995–2017) (Nasdaq: YHOO)
- Hooker Creek Airport (ICAO: YHOO)
