= Gurindji, Northern Territory =

Gurindji Northern Territory
- Coordinates: 18°09′22″S 130°46′52″E
- Population: 17 (2016 census) (Note: For the 2016 census, the State Suburb of Gurindji uses the boundaries of the locality of Gurindji in force prior to the alteration of the locality of Lajamanu on 27 August 2014.)
  - Density: 0.000525/km^{2} (0.00136/sq mi)
- Established: 4 April 2007
- Postcode(s): 0852
- Elevation: 196 m (643 ft)(weather station)
- Area: 32,372 km^{2} (12,498.9 sq mi)
- Time zone: ACST (UTC+9:30)
- Location: 549 km (341 mi) S of Darwin
- LGA(s): Central Desert Region; Victoria Daly Region
- Territory electorate(s): Gwoja
- Federal division(s): Lingiari
Mean max temp	Mean min temp	Annual rainfall
34.3 °C; 94 °F	19.0 °C; 66 °F	694.8 mm 27.4 in
Suburbs around Gurindji:
Gregory	Gregory; Victoria River	Victoria River
Buchanan; Tanami	Gurindji	Tanami East
Tanami	Tanami	Tanami East
- Footnotes: Adjoining localities

Gurindji is a locality in the Northern Territory of Australia located about 459 kilometres (285 mi) south of the territory capital of Darwin.

The locality consists of the following land (from north to south, then west to east):

1. The Daguragu Aboriginal Land Trust, the Wave Hill and Cattle Creek pastoral leases, and the Wampana-Karlantijpa Aboriginal Land Trust,
2. The Hooker Creek Aboriginal Land Trust, and
3. Land at the northern end of the Central Desert Aboriginal Land Trust.

The locality fully surrounds the communities of Daguragu, Kalkarindji and Lajamanu. As of 2020, it has an area of 32,372 square kilometres (12,499 sq mi).

The locality’s boundaries and name were gazetted on 4 April 2007. Its boundaries were altered on 27 August 2014 to gain most of the land in the locality of Lajamanu with exception to that containing the Lajamanu community. Its name is derived from “the Gurindji tribe of Aboriginals who walked off the Wave Hill Pastoral Station in protest of lack of wages.”

Gurindji includes the historic site, the Gurindji Wave Hill Walk Off Route, which was listed on the Northern Territory Heritage Register on 27 October 2006.

The 2016 Australian census which was conducted in August 2016 reports that Gurindji had 17 people living within its boundaries.

Gurindji is located within the federal division of Lingiari, the territory electoral division of Stuart and the local government areas of the Central Desert Region and the Victoria Daly Region.

== Climate ==
Climate data for Wave Hill, elevation 196 m (643 ft), (1991–2020 normals, extremes 1973–2022)
Month	Jan	Feb	Mar	Apr	May	Jun	Jul	Aug	Sep	Oct	Nov	Dec	Year
Record high °C (°F)	45.0 (113.0)	44.5 (112.1)	43.5 (110.3)	40.5 (104.9)	38.3 (100.9)	36.5 (97.7)	36.6 (97.9)	38.0 (100.4)	41.5 (106.7)	45.0 (113.0)	45.6 (114.1)	45.2 (113.4)	45.6 (114.1)
Mean daily maximum °C (°F)	37.0 (98.6)	36.0 (96.8)	35.6 (96.1)	34.9 (94.8)	31.2 (88.2)	28.5 (83.3)	28.8 (83.8)	31.3 (88.3)	35.8 (96.4)	38.0 (100.4)	38.9 (102.0)	37.9 (100.2)	34.5 (94.1)
Mean daily minimum °C (°F)	24.6 (76.3)	24.0 (75.2)	22.3 (72.1)	19.2 (66.6)	15.1 (59.2)	11.8 (53.2)	11.1 (52.0)	12.5 (54.5)	18.3 (64.9)	21.8 (71.2)	24.1 (75.4)	24.7 (76.5)	19.1 (66.4)
Record low °C (°F)	15.5 (59.9)	16.4 (61.5)	11.7 (53.1)	5.0 (41.0)	3.4 (38.1)	1.3 (34.3)	0.0 (32.0)	0.1 (32.2)	6.0 (42.8)	9.4 (48.9)	12.9 (55.2)	16.1 (61.0)	0.0 (32.0)
Average rainfall mm (inches)	159.8 (6.29)	179.4 (7.06)	110.6 (4.35)	18.6 (0.73)	8.0 (0.31)	3.5 (0.14)	3.2 (0.13)	1.3 (0.05)	12.8 (0.50)	24.3 (0.96)	52.4 (2.06)	117.2 (4.61)	691.1 (27.19)
Average rainy days (≥ 1.0 mm)	10.6	10.8	6.5	1.3	1.0	0.3	0.3	0.1	0.9	3.1	5.2	9.3	49.4
Source: Australian Bureau of Meteorology
