= Sheila Brown Napaljarri =

Australian artist

- Born: b. c. 1940; Lajamanu, Northern Territory
- Died: 2003 (aged 62–63)
- Style: Acrylic paint

Sheila Brown Napaljarri (c. 1940–2003) was a Warlpiri-speaking Indigenous artist from Australia's Western Desert region. A contributor to major collaborative paintings by Indigenous communities, her works are also held by the Art Gallery of New South Wales and the South Australian Museum.

== Life ==
Brown was born circa 1940 in the Lajamanu region of the Northern Territory, approximately 900 kilometres south of Darwin. The ambiguity around the year of birth is in part because Indigenous Australians operate using a different conception of time, often estimating dates through comparisons with the occurrence of other events.

'Napaljarri' (in Warlpiri) or 'Napaltjarri' (in Western Desert dialects) is a skin name, one of sixteen used to denote the subsections or subgroups in the kinship system of central Australian Indigenous people. These names define kinship relationships that influence preferred marriage partners and may be associated with particular totems. Although they may be used as terms of address, they are not surnames in the sense used by Europeans. Thus 'Sheila Brown' is the element of the artist's name that is specifically hers.

In 2003, the year of her death, Brown was living at Mangurrurpa.

== Art ==
=== Background ===
Contemporary Indigenous art of the western desert began when Indigenous men at Papunya began painting in 1971, assisted by teacher Geoffrey Bardon. Their work, which used acrylic paints to create designs representing body painting and ground sculptures, rapidly spread across Indigenous communities of central Australia, particularly following the commencement of a government-sanctioned art program in central Australia in 1983. By the 1980s and 1990s, such work was being exhibited internationally. The first artists, including all of the founders of the Papunya Tula artists' company, had been men, and there was resistance amongst the Pintupi men of central Australia to women painting. However, there was also a desire amongst many of the women to participate, and in the 1990s large numbers of them began to create paintings. In the western desert communities such as Kintore, Yuendumu, Balgo, and on the outstations, people were beginning to create art works expressly for exhibition and sale.

=== Career ===
One of the first women of Yuendumu to work with acrylic paints, Brown painted for Warlukurlangu Artists in Yuendumu, which she continued to do when living at Mangurrurpa. In October 1985, she was amongst the artists whose works were exhibited at the first exhibition of paintings from Yuendumu, at the Araluen Centre for Arts and Entertainment in Alice Springs.

Western Desert artists such as Brown will frequently paint particular 'dreamings', or stories, for which they have personal responsibility or rights. Her works included paintings of Witi Jukurrpa, or ceremonial pole dreaming, Ngarlkirdi, or witchetty grub, Yiwarra, or Milky Way, bandicoot and Two Women. All are associated with the area around Kunajarrayi, or Mount Nicker, an important ceremonial site in the Northern Territory near the Western Australian border. Some of these dreaming stories are shared with other prominent artists, including Paddy Japaljarri Sims, one of the initiators of the Yuendumu doors project, widely considered the genesis of the contemporary Indigenous art movement.

Brown is one of a group of artists who contributed some major collaborative works. In 1994 she was one of the artists responsible for Karntakurlangu Jukurrpa (Women's Dreaming), held by the Art Gallery of New South Wales. The work was exhibited in the gallery as part of the Gamarada exhibition of 1996–97. In 1996 Brown was one of the twenty-nine women and five men who collaborated to produce Karrku Jukurrpa, a work commissioned for the collection of John Kluge and exhibited in the Kluge-Ruhe Aboriginal Art Collection at the University of Virginia. The painting assembles a range of mythological symbols and stories associated with the people and country around Yuendumu.

== Collections ==
- Art Gallery of New South Wales
- South Australian Museum
