= Hooker Creek Airport =

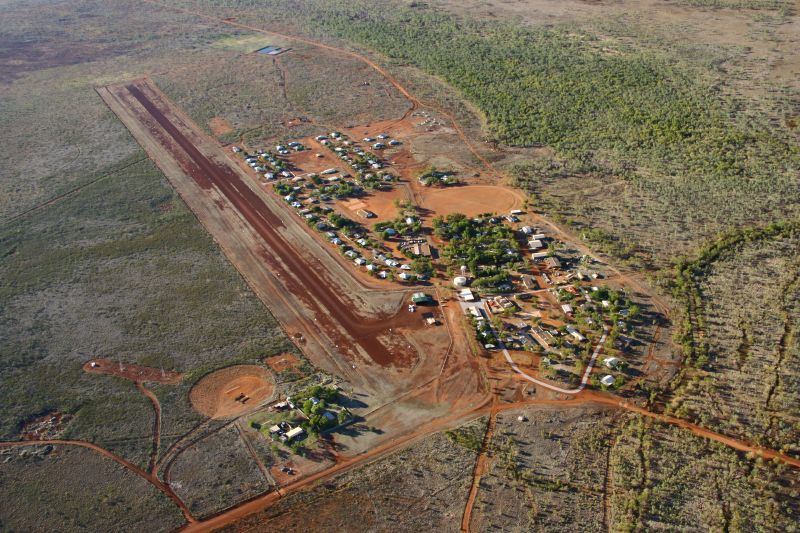
- IATA: HOK; ICAO: YHOO

Summary
- Airport type: Public
- Owner: Lajamanu Air Pty Ltd
- Location: Lajamanu
- Elevation AMSL: 1,050 ft / 320 m
- Coordinates: 18°20′12″S 130°38′36″E

Map
- Location in the Northern Territory

Runways
Direction	Length		Surface
Direction	m	ft	Surface
10/28	1,585	5,200	Sealed
- Sources: Australian AIP and aerodrome chart

Hooker Creek Airport (IATA: HOK, ICAO: YHOO), also known as Hooker Creek Aerodrome and Lajamanu Airport, is an airport in Lajamanu, Northern Territory, Australia. The airstrip is sealed.

It is serviced by chartered flights, the Royal Australian Air Force and the Royal Flying Doctor Service. As of December 2021 the main private operator is Chartair.

== See also ==
- List of airports in the Northern Territory
