= Lily Nungarrayi Yirringali Jurrah Hargraves =

Australian artist

Lily Nungarrayi Yirringali Jurrah Hargraves (1930–2018) was a Walpiri artist and senior Law woman from Lajamanu, Northern Territory, Australia. She was also known as Maggie Jurrah/Hargraves. Later in her life she preferred to be known as Jurrah but is best known as Lily Hargraves. Her Warlpiri name was Yirringali, while Nungarrayi was her skin name.

== Life and art ==
Nungarrayi was one of the old desert walkers born in the Tanami Desert near Jilla or Chilla Well in 1930. In the 1950s she moved to the settlement of Lajamanu. She began painting on canvas in 1986 after a Traditional Painting Course was held in Lajamanu. Nungarrayi's art is held in a number of major collections, and her work has been widely exhibited both in Australia and overseas, including France and the USA. In 2009 Nungarrayi was a finalist in the Telstra National Aboriginal and Torres Strait Islander Art Awards.

In her later years her style changed, showing more freedom and use of colour. Nungarrayi continued to produce traditional paintings using bold colours on canvas and paint at the Warnayaka Art Gallery in Lajamanu.

As a senior Law woman, she was responsible for supervising women's song and dance ceremonies.

Nungarrayi died in 2018.

== Collections ==
- AAMU - Museum of Contemporary Aboriginal Art, The Netherlands
- Collection Roemer, Germany
- Museum and Art Gallery of Northern Territory, Australia
- National Gallery of Victoria, Melbourne, Australia
- United Nations Office, Darwin, Australia
- Peter Boehm Collection, Sydney NSW Australia
