= Richard Conway White =

Australian judge (born 1952)

Richard Conway White, KC (born 6 January 1952) was appointed as a judge on 6 May 2004 to the Supreme Court of South Australia, which is the highest ranking court in the Australian State of South Australia.

White received an LL.B. from the University of Adelaide. He gained admission to the bar in 1976, and was made Queen's Counsel in 1997.

White served on the Supreme Court of South Australia from 6 May 2004 to 30 August 2013, and was thereafter a judge of the Federal Court of Australia from 31 August 2013 to 5 January 2022. In 2020, White presided over a native title claim that had been lodged in 2016 by the Central Land Council on behalf of the traditional owners of Wave Hill Station, as there were mining interests in the area covered by Wave Hill Station's pastoral lease. On 8 September 2020, White recognised the native title rights of the Gurindji people to 5,000 square kilometres (1,900 sq mi) of the Wave Hill Station, allowing them to receive royalties as compensation from resource companies who explore the area. White said that the determination recognised Indigenous involvement (Jamangku, Japuwuny, Parlakuna-Parkinykarni and Yilyilyimawu peoples) with the land "at least since European settlement and probably for millennia".

== See also ==
- Judiciary of Australia
