= 2000–01 Australian region cyclone season =

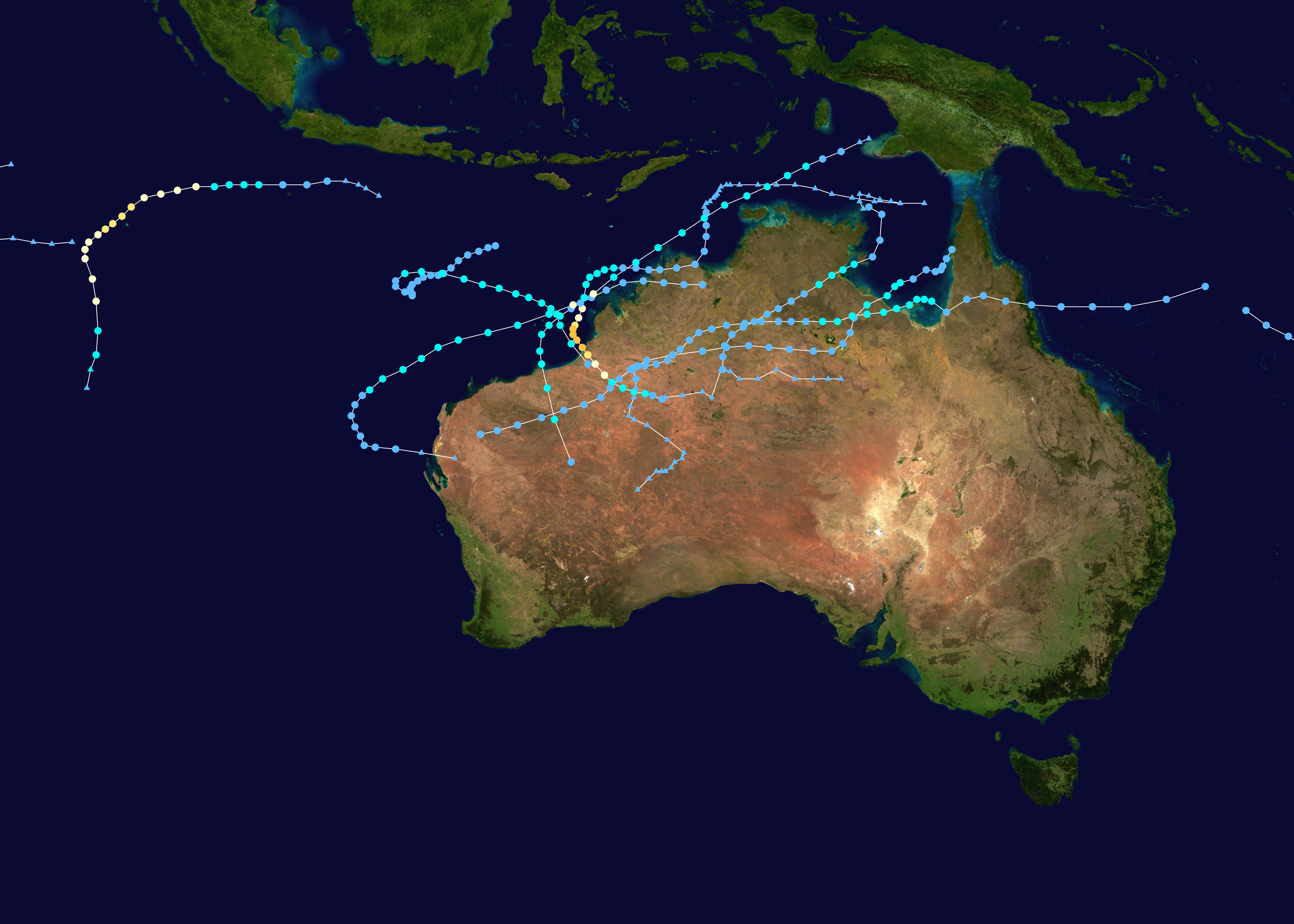
- Season summary map

Seasonal boundaries
- First system formed: 3 December 2000
- Last system dissipated: 23 April 2001

Strongest storm
- Name: Sam
  - Maximum winds: 205 km/h (125 mph) (10-minute sustained)
  - Lowest pressure: 935 hPa (mbar)

Seasonal statistics
- Tropical lows: 14
- Tropical cyclones: 9
- Severe tropical cyclones: 3
- Total fatalities: 2 total
- Total damage: $12.8 million (2001 USD)

Related articles
- 2000–01 South-West Indian Ocean cyclone season; 2000–01 South Pacific cyclone season

The 2000–01 Australian region cyclone season was a below average tropical cyclone season. It began on 1 November 2000 and ended on 30 April 2001. The regional tropical cyclone operational plan also defines a tropical cyclone year separately from a tropical cyclone season, which runs from 1 July 2000 to 30 June 2001.

Tropical cyclones in this area are monitored by four Tropical Cyclone Warning Centres (TCWCs): the Australian Bureau of Meteorology in Perth, Darwin, and Brisbane; and TCWC Port Moresby in Papua New Guinea.

== Systems ==
=== Severe Tropical Cyclone Sam ===
- Category 5 severe tropical cyclone (Australian scale)
- Category 3 tropical cyclone (SSHWS)
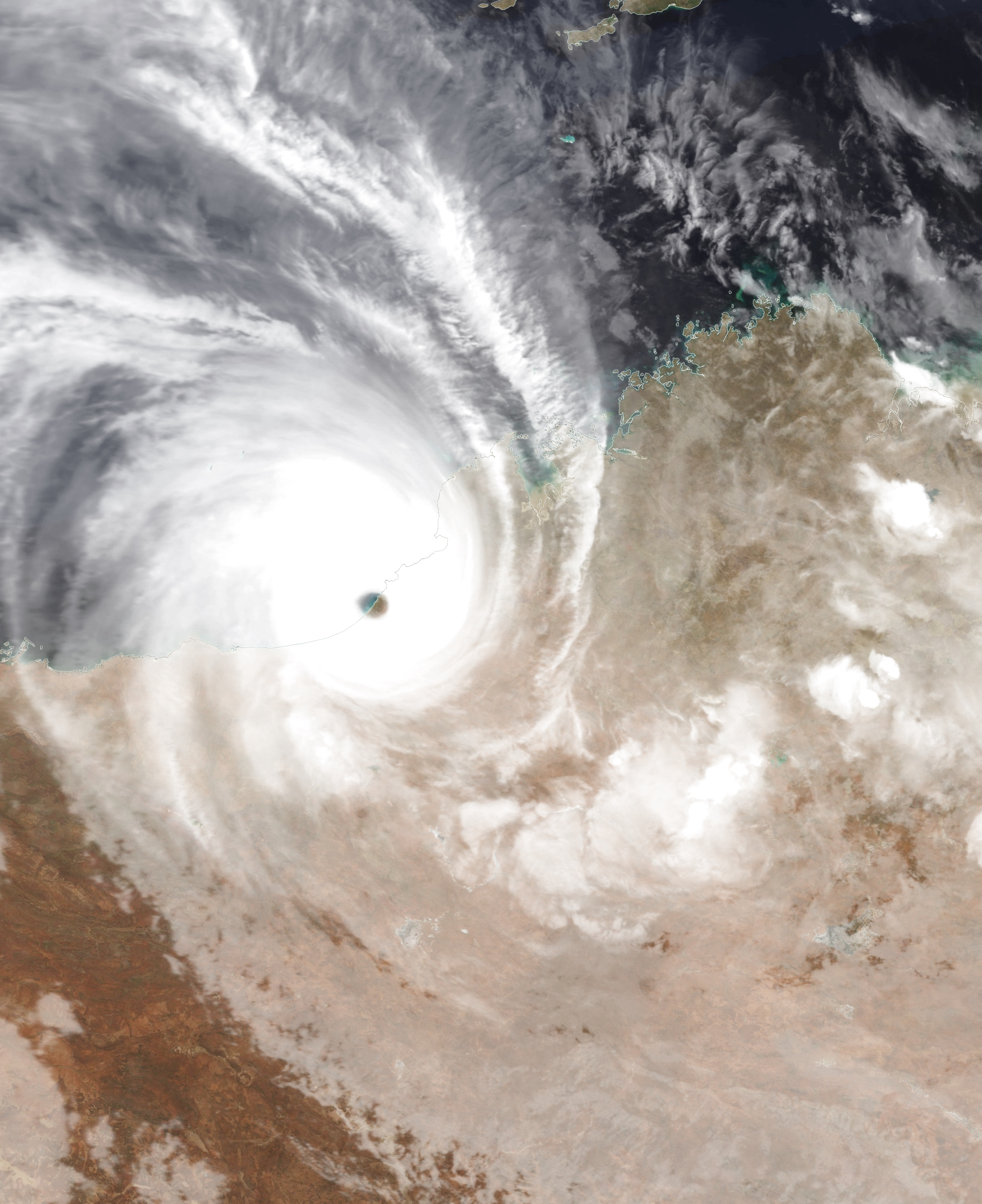
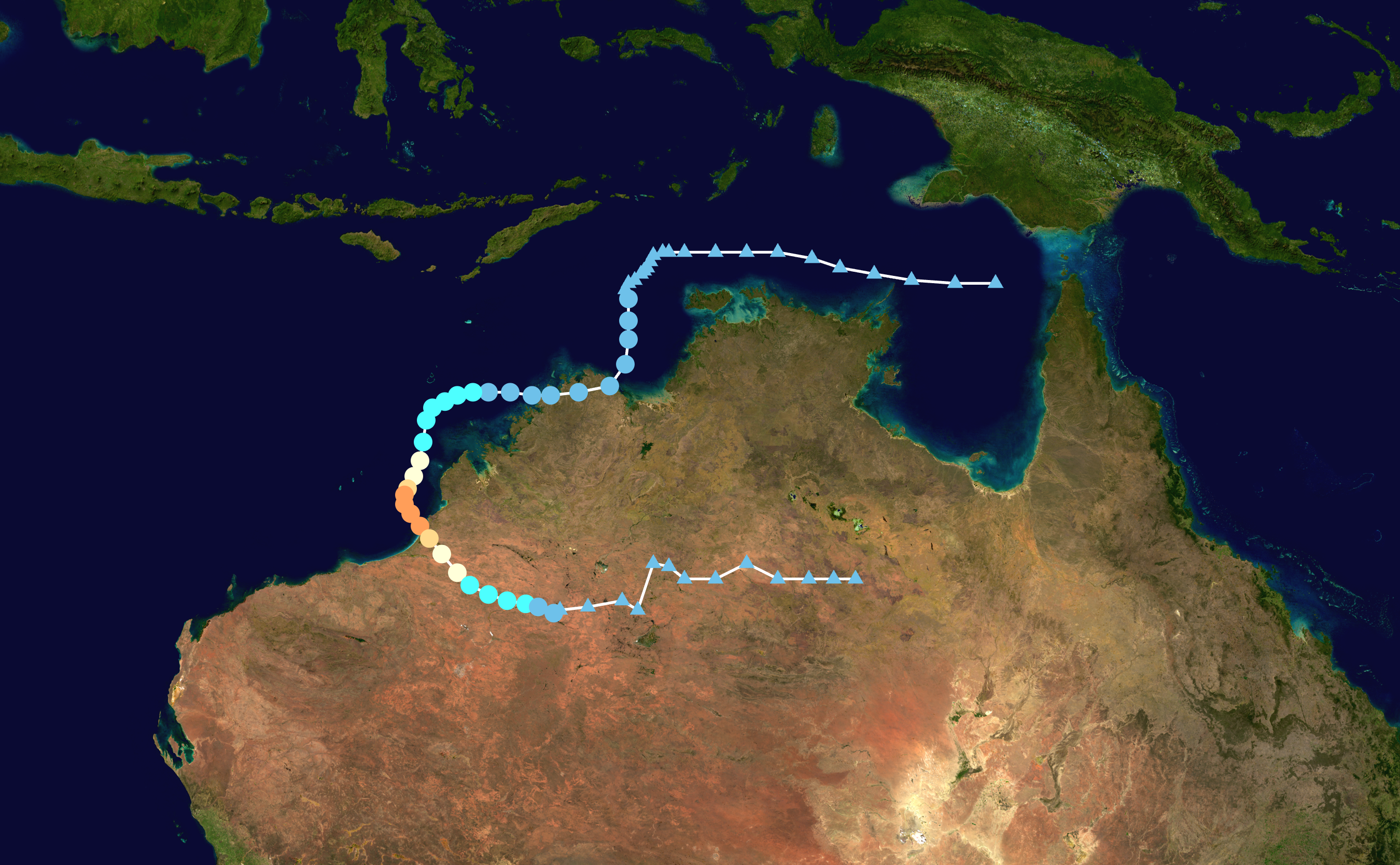
- Duration: 3 December – 10 December
- Peak intensity: 205 km/h (125 mph) (10-min); 935 hPa (mbar)

Sam originated from a tropical low that formed in the Arafura Sea on 28 November. Tracking generally westward, the initial low-pressure area remained generally weak until it entered the Timor Sea, by which time it had strengthened into a tropical cyclone on 5 December. Though a subtropical ridge was forcing the cyclone westward at the time, an approaching shortwave trough caused Sam to track southward the following day, towards the Australian coast. During its southward progression, Sam rapidly intensified, and reached its peak intensity on 7 December. The next day, the storm made landfall near Lagrange, Western Australia at the same intensity. Once inland, Sam was slow to weaken as it recurved eastward, and persisted for nearly a week inland before dissipating on 14 December.

Throughout its existence, Cyclone Sam brought heavy rainfall to a wide swath of northern Australia. Rainfall peaked at520 mm (20 in) in Shelamar over a 48-hour period ending on 11 December. Upon making landfall, damage was considerable, albeit localized. Most of the destruction wrought by Sam occurred near the coast, particularly in Bidyadanga and Anna Springs Station. Some buildings sustained considerable damage, and trees and power lines were felled, resulting in some power outages. Offshore, 163 illegal immigrants aboard two vessels were feared to have drowned, which would make Sam one of the deadliest cyclones in Australian history. However, these people were later accounted for.

=== Tropical Cyclone Terri ===
- Category 2 tropical cyclone (Australian scale)
- Tropical storm (SSHWS)
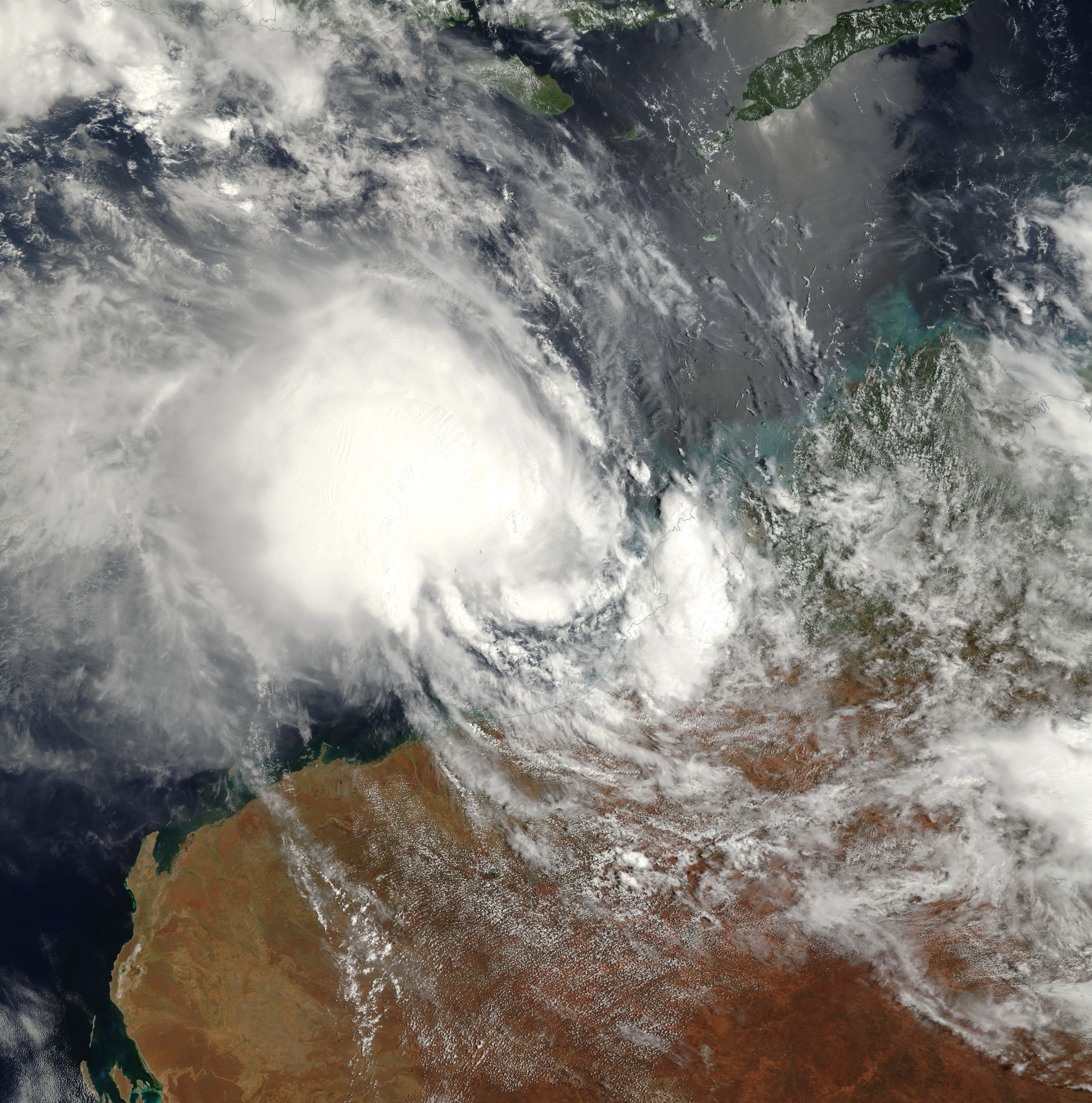
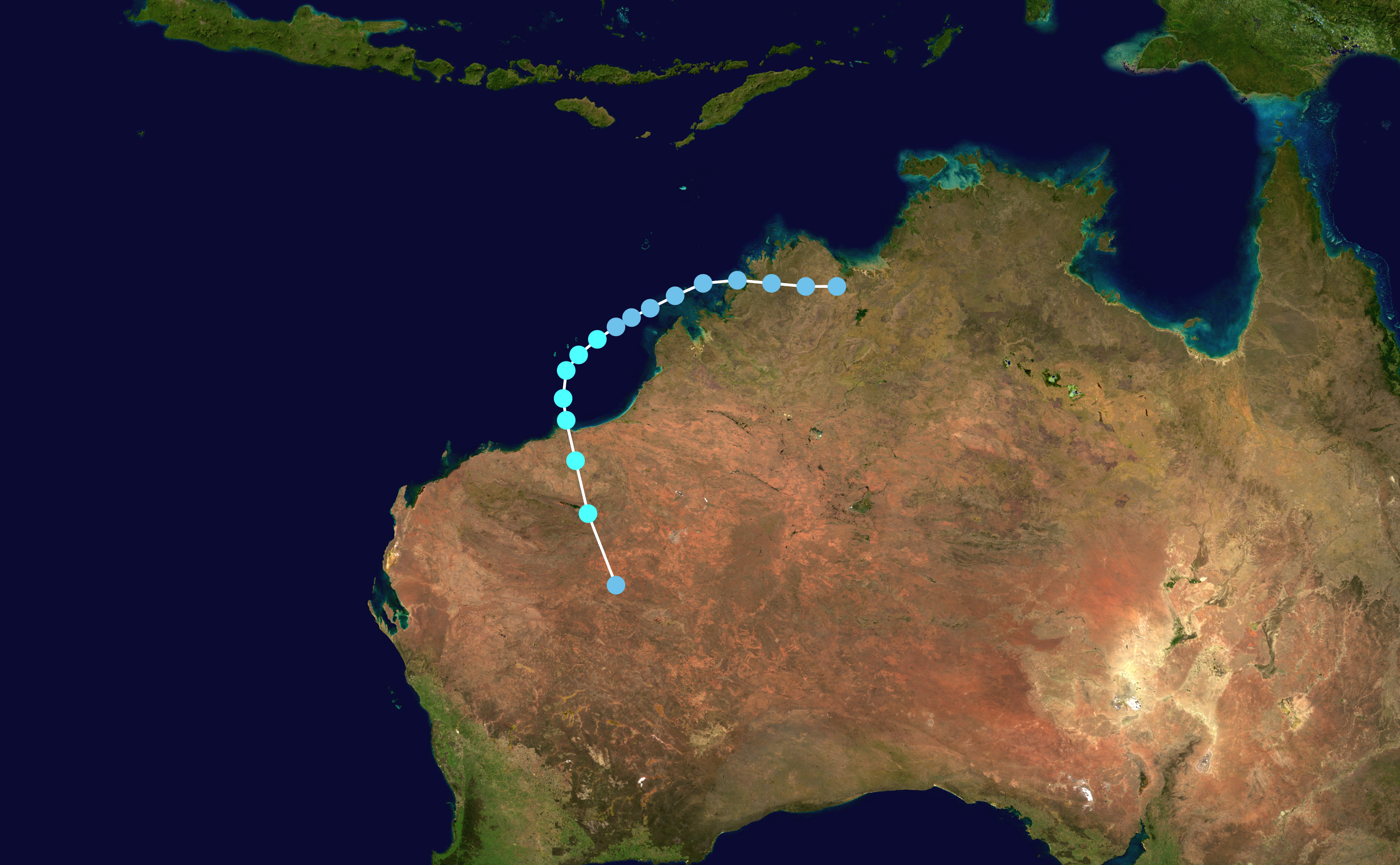
- Duration: 27 January – 31 January
- Peak intensity: 110 km/h (70 mph) (10-min); 975 hPa (mbar)

Terri formed on 27 January 2001 near the northern Kimberley coast. The storm paralleled the coast, reaching Category 2 strength before making landfall near Pardoo early on 31 January. The storm dissipated Late on the same day.

=== Tropical Cyclone Vincent ===
- Category 1 tropical cyclone (Australian scale)
- Tropical storm (SSHWS)
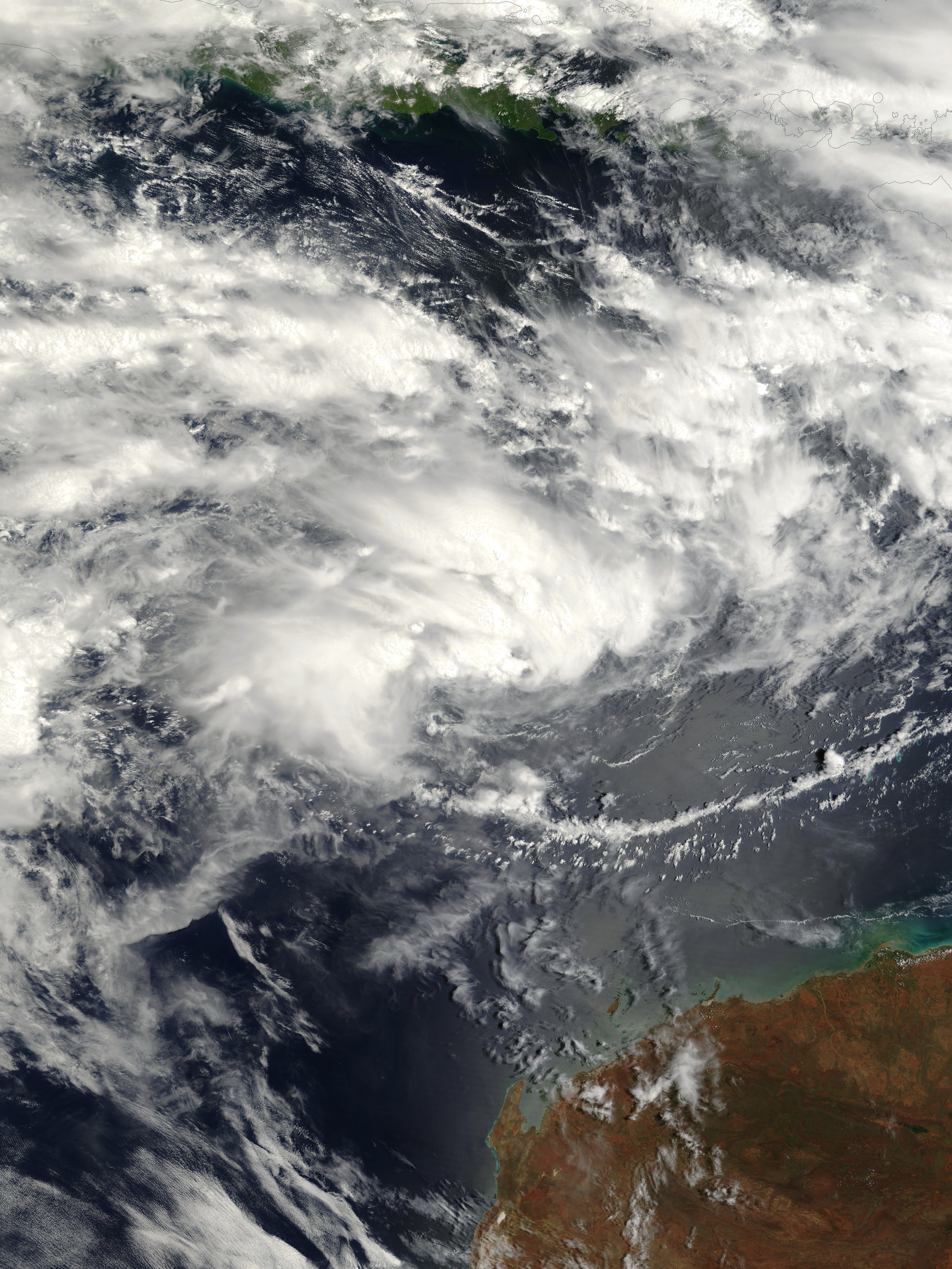
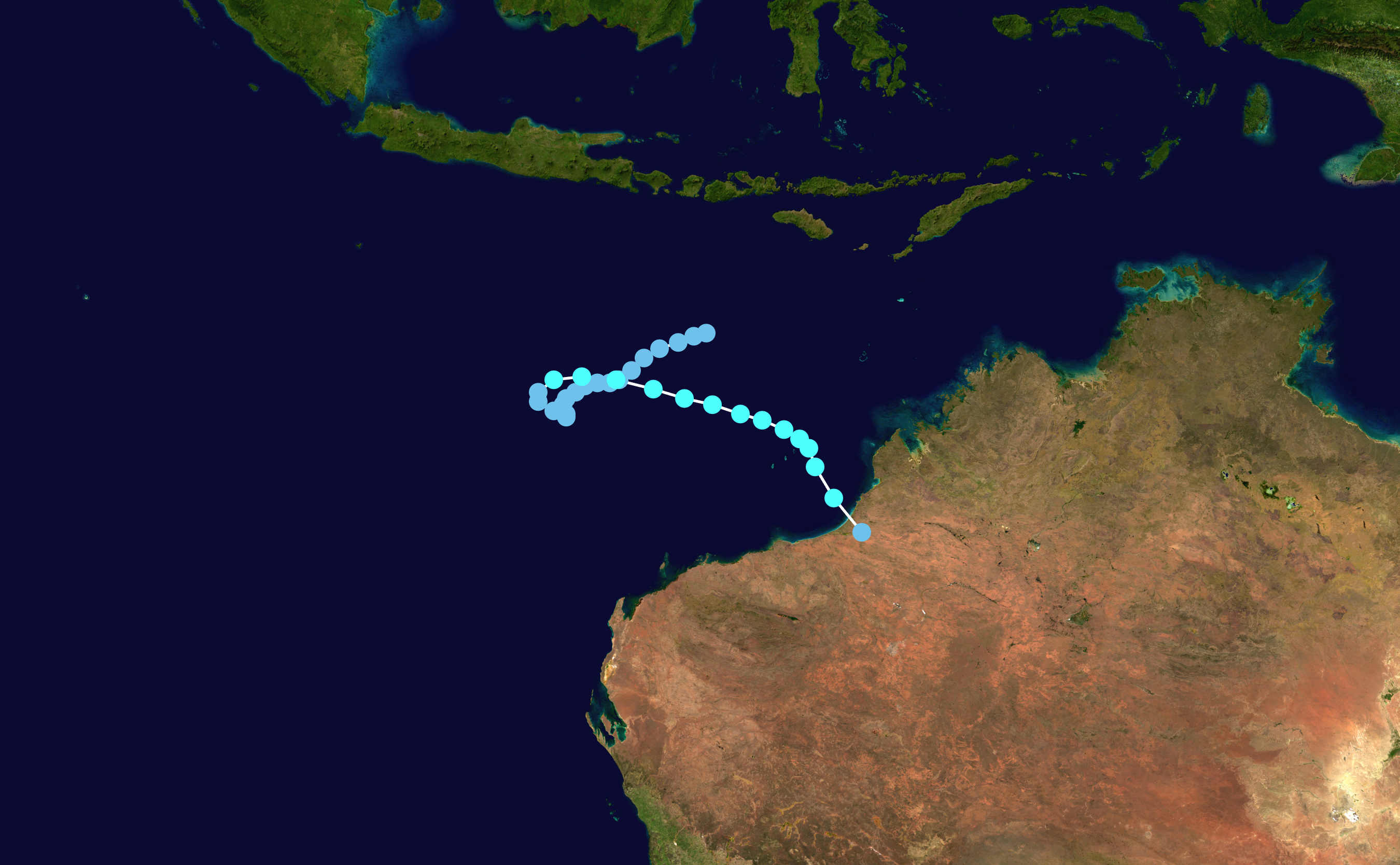
- Duration: 7 February – 15 February
- Peak intensity: 85 km/h (50 mph) (10-min); 980 hPa (mbar)

Cyclone Vincent formed on 7 February 2001, 900 km northwest of Onslow, Western Australia from an active monsoonal trough. Wind shear prevented the tropical low from intensifying for a few days, but once the storm formed it began to move southeast and intensify. Vincent peaked with sustained winds of 100 km/h (65 mph) which made it a Category 2 tropical cyclone on the Australian tropical cyclone intensity scale. Cyclone Vincent crossed the Western Australia coast as a tropical low, a few kilometres south of Broome, Western Australia.

=== Tropical Cyclone Winsome ===
- Category 1 tropical cyclone (Australian scale)
- Tropical storm (SSHWS)
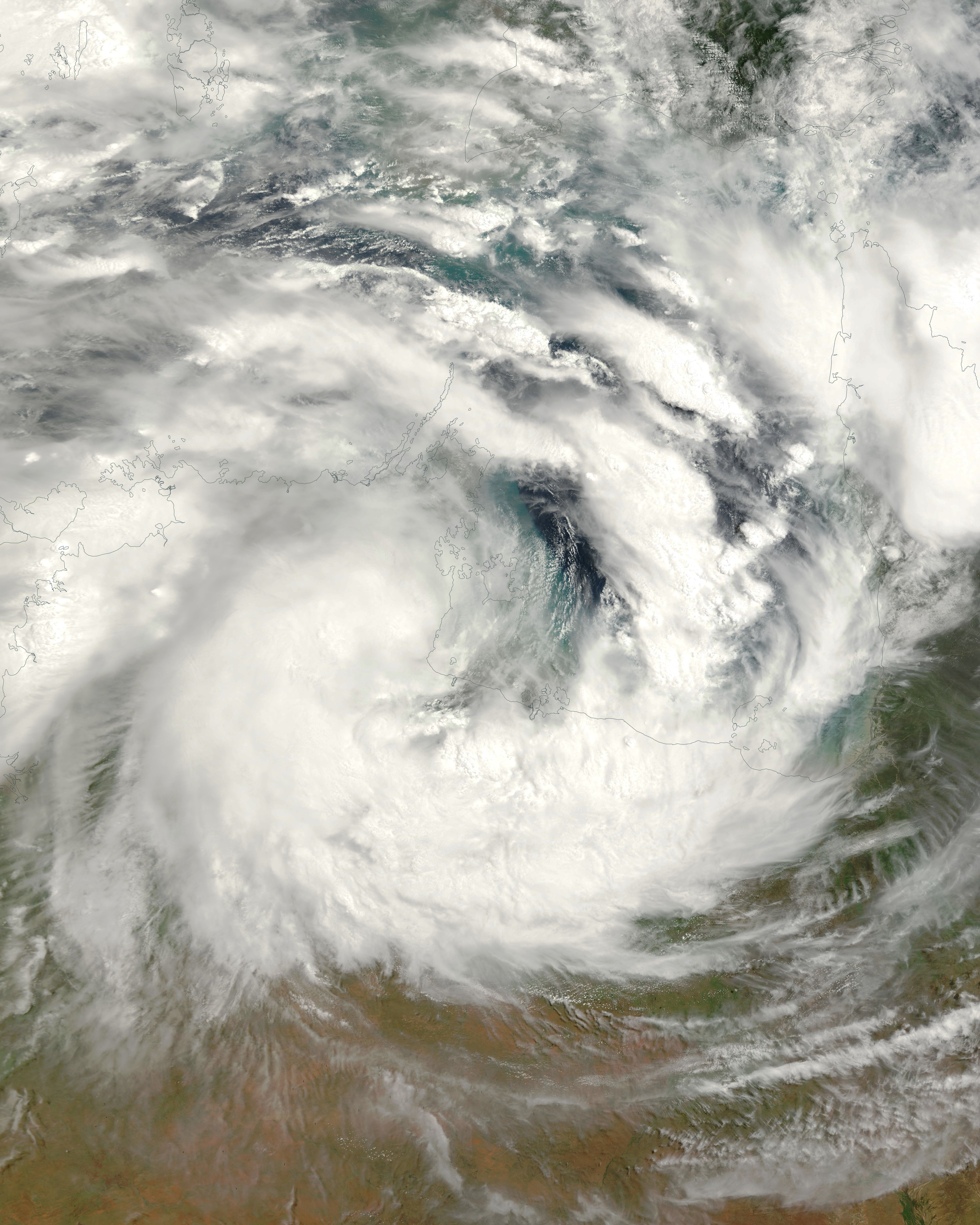
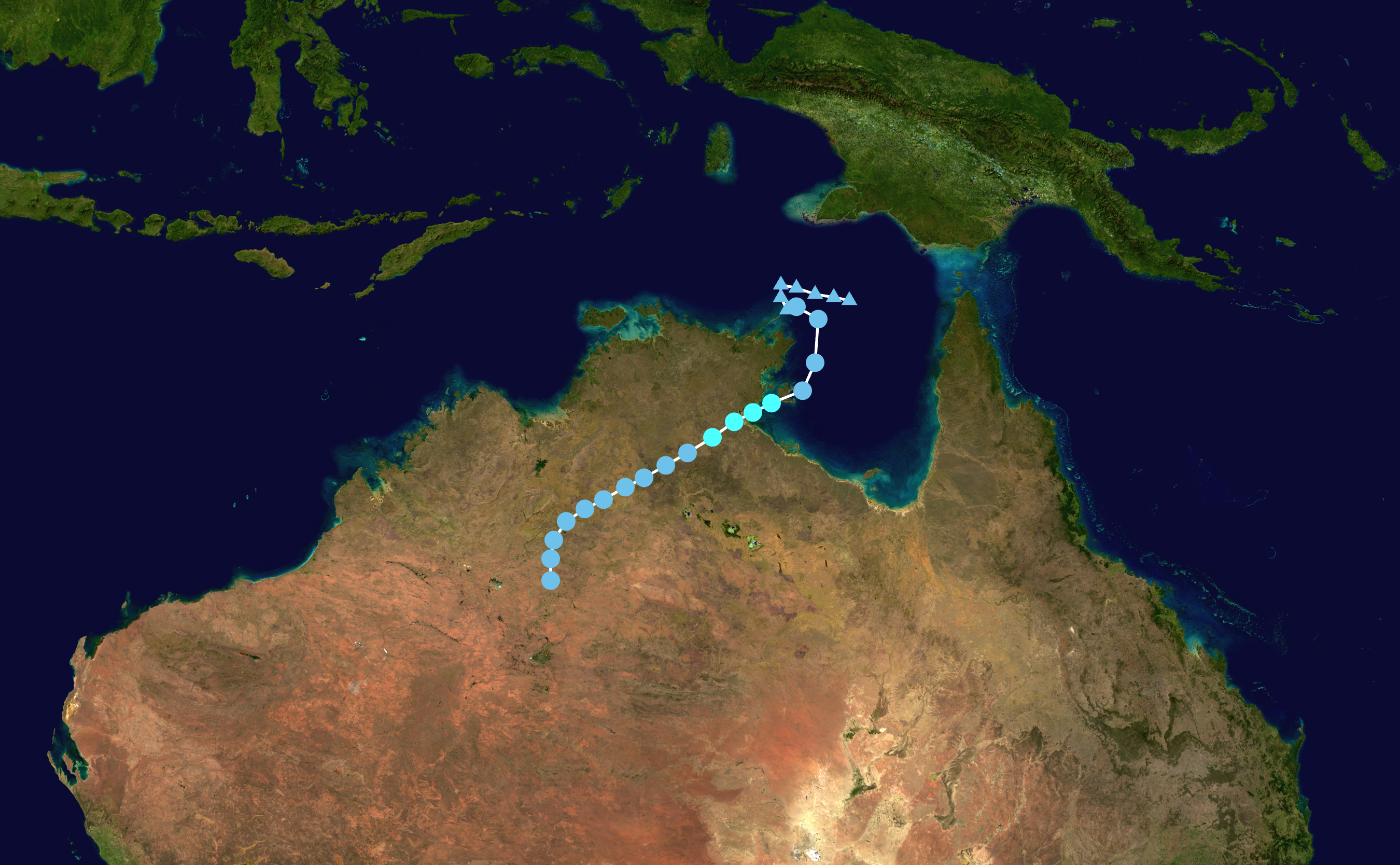
- Duration: 8 February – 14 February
- Peak intensity: 75 km/h (45 mph) (10-min); 981 hPa (mbar)

Winsome was a weak system that developed from a low in the Gulf of Carpentaria on 8 February.

Torrential rains produced by the storm in the Northern Territory resulted in severe flooding which killed two people.

=== Tropical Cyclone Wylva ===
- Category 1 tropical cyclone (Australian scale)
- Tropical storm (SSHWS)
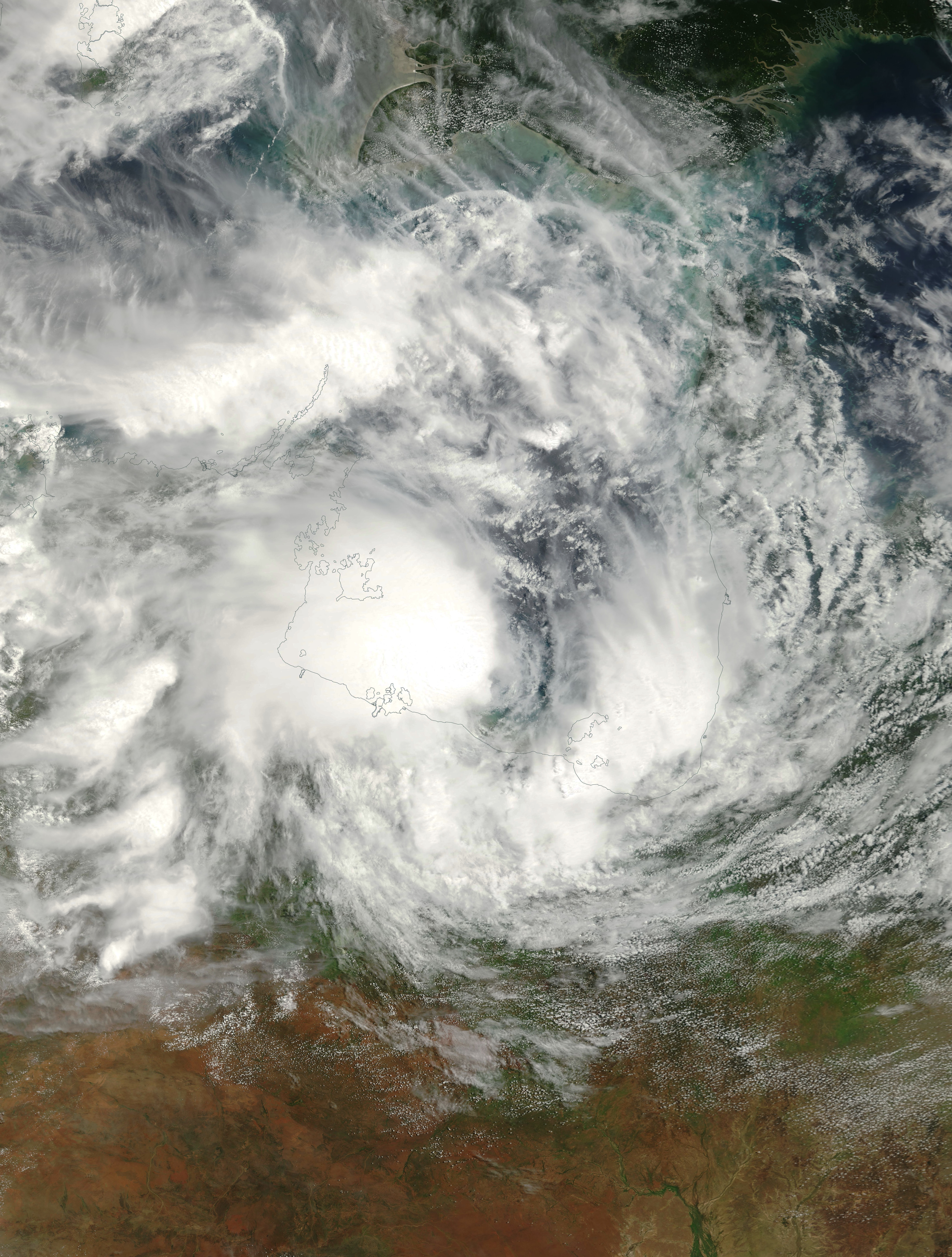
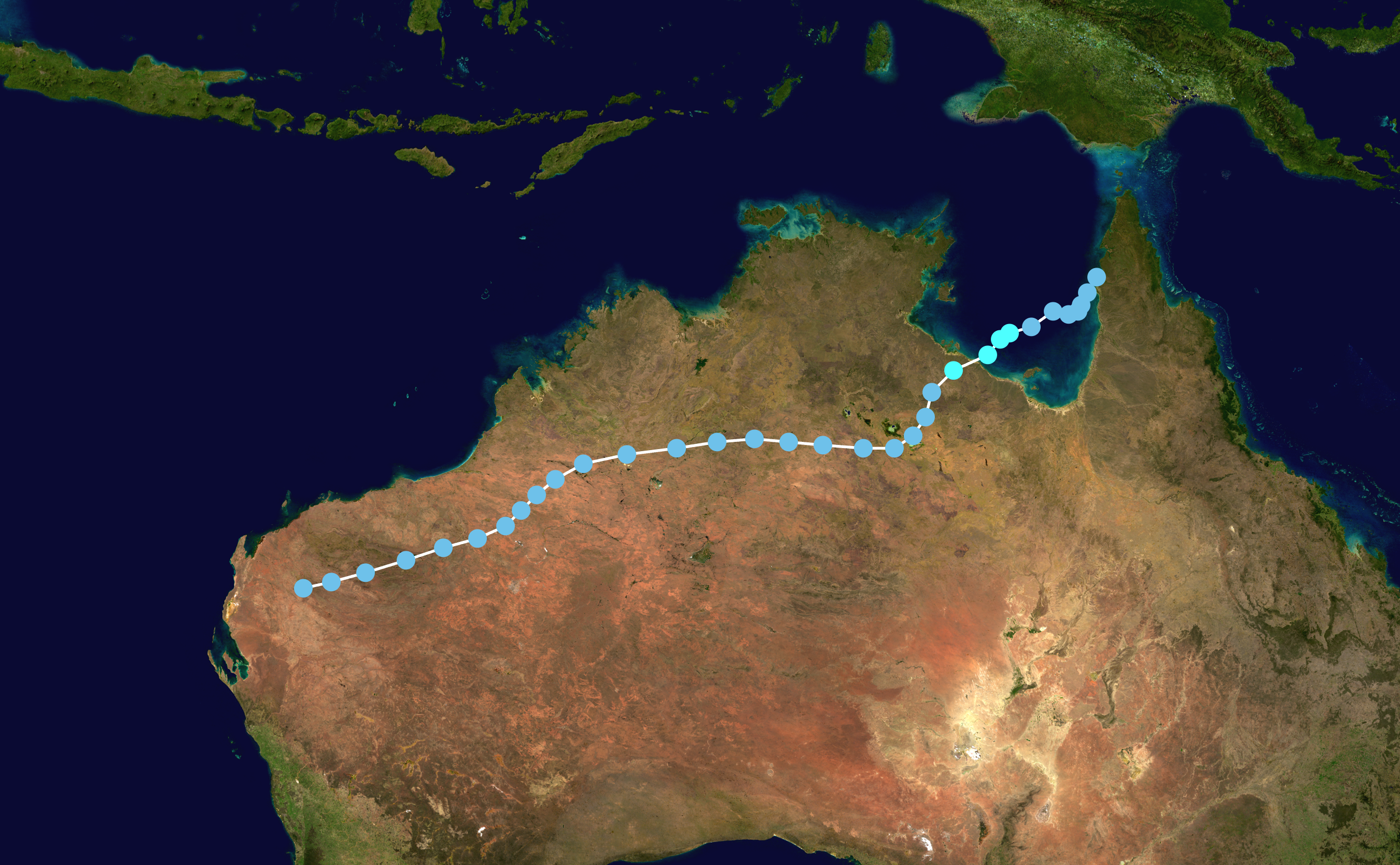
- Duration: 14 February – 22 February
- Peak intensity: 75 km/h (45 mph) (10-min); 988 hPa (mbar)

Wylva formed from a low in the Gulf of Carpentaria on 15 February. Wylva briefly became a Category 1 tropical cyclone before making landfall near Booroloola in the morning of 16 February. Even though the system made landfall in a remote area, the remnants of the system caused $13 million in damage and around 700 people had to be evacuated. The remnants of Wylva dissipated on 22 February near Nanutarra.

=== Tropical Low 10P (07F) ===
- Tropical low (Australian scale)
- Tropical depression (SSHWS)
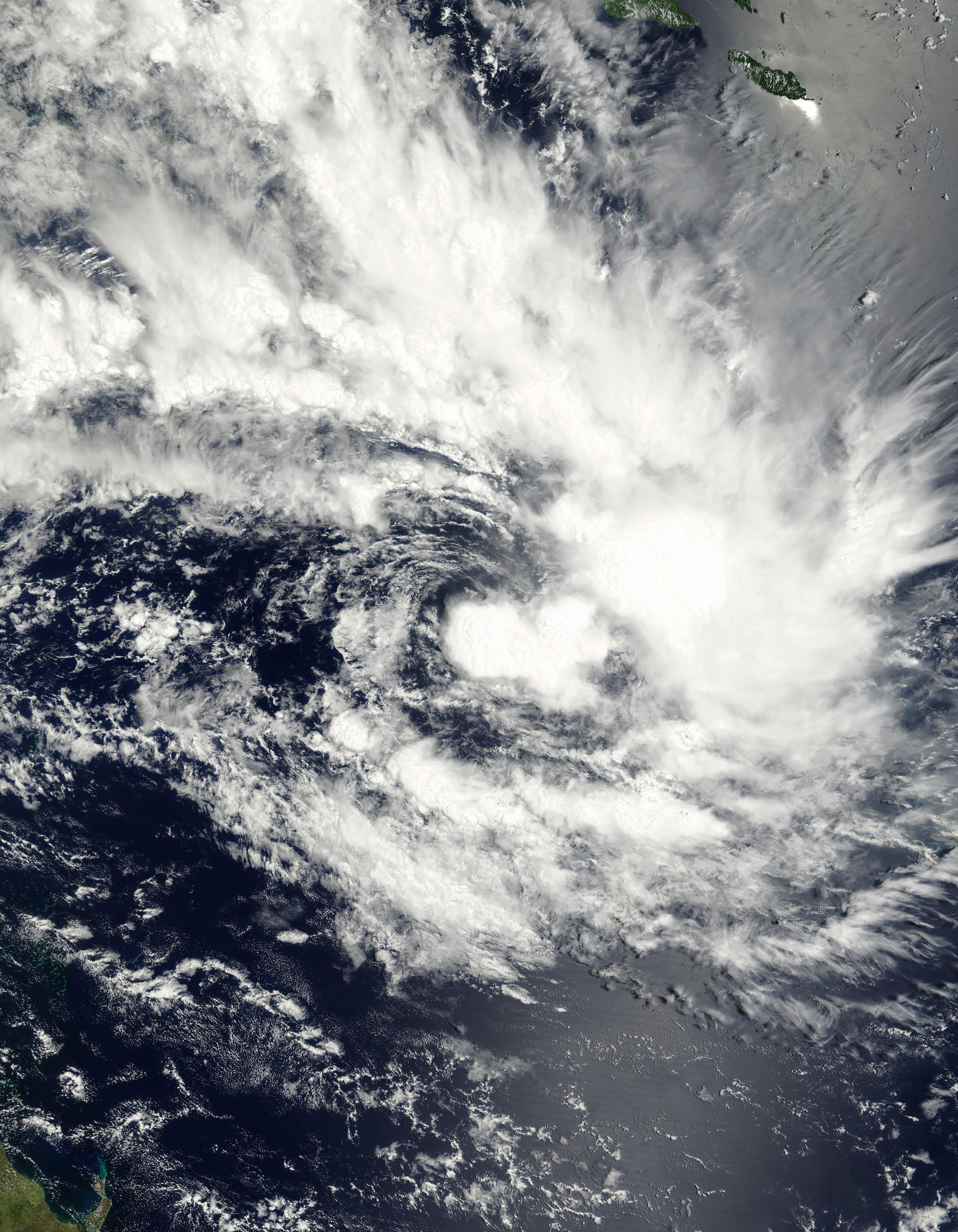
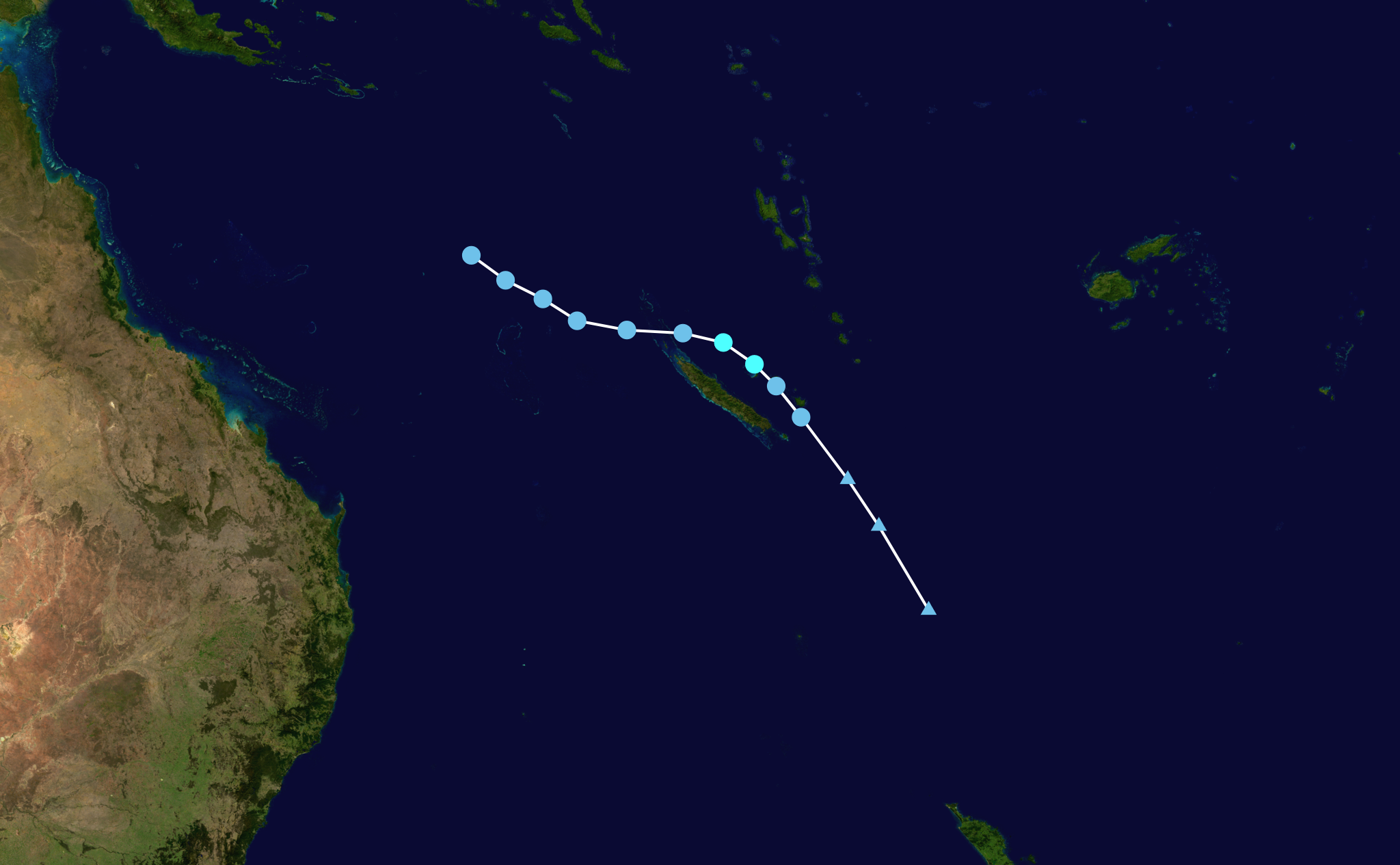
- Duration: 16 February – 16 February (exited basin)
- Peak intensity: 55 km/h (35 mph) (10-min); 1000 hPa (mbar)

This storm moved from Brisbane's area of responsibility into Fiji's on 16 February. It dissipated on 18 February.

=== Severe Tropical Cyclone Abigail ===
- Category 3 severe tropical cyclone (Australian scale)
- Tropical storm (SSHWS)
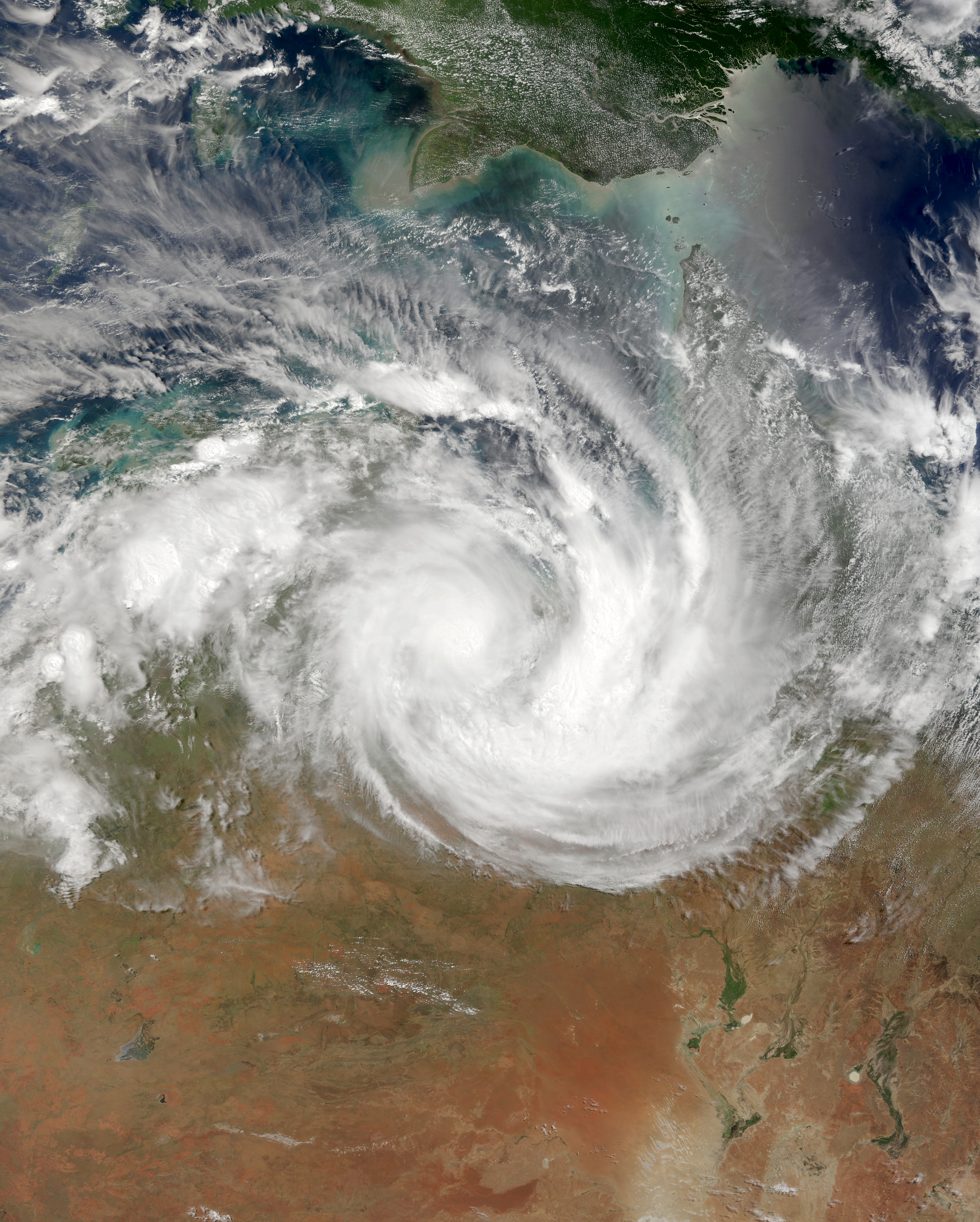
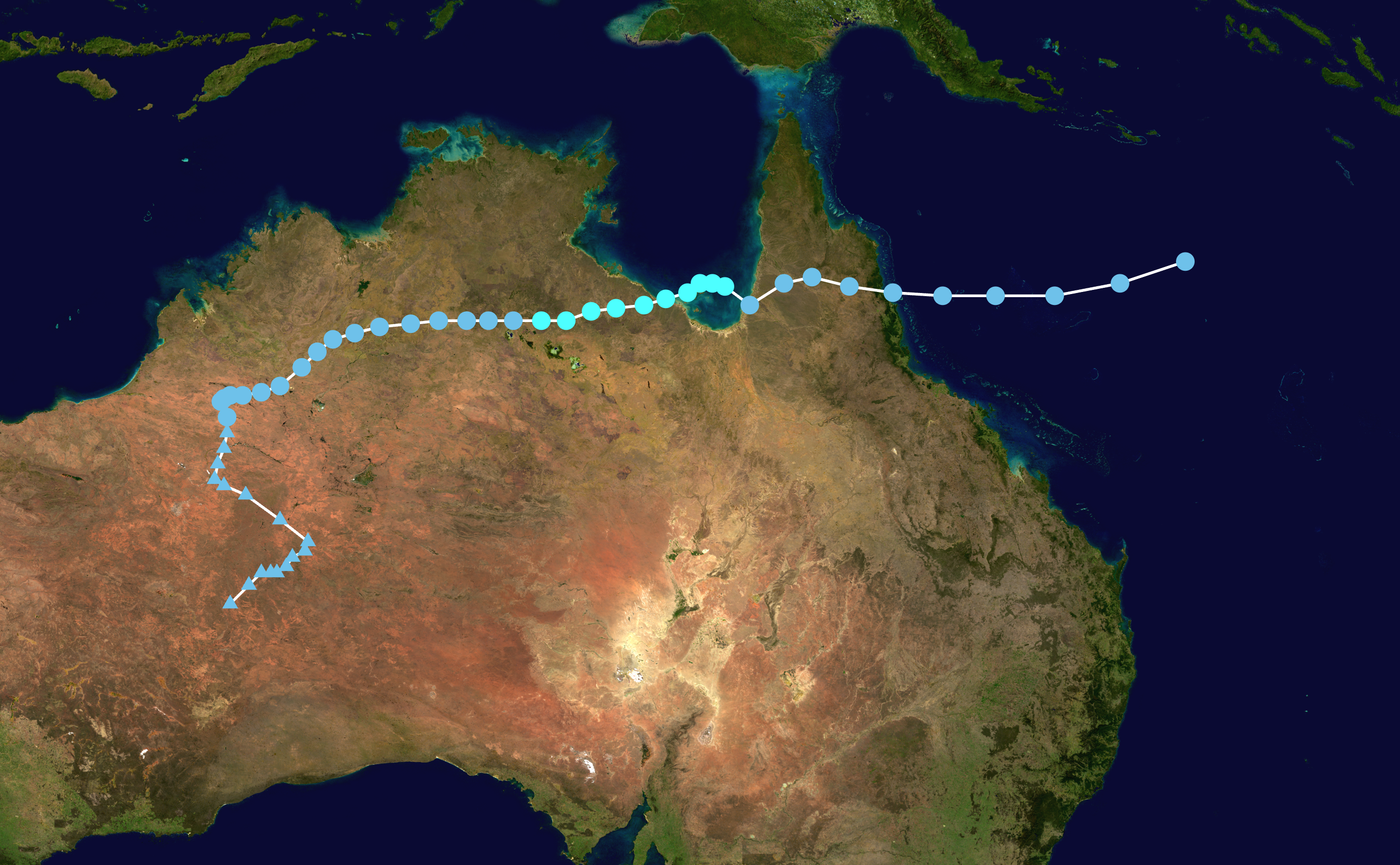
- Duration: 24 February – 8 March
- Peak intensity: 120 km/h (75 mph) (10-min); 970 hPa (mbar)

On 24 February 2001, Cyclone Abigail formed about 80 km northeast of Cairns, Australia. It then made landfall in Queensland as a Category 1 storm.

=== Severe Tropical Cyclone Walter ===
- Category 3 severe tropical cyclone (Australian scale)
- Category 2 tropical cyclone (SSHWS)
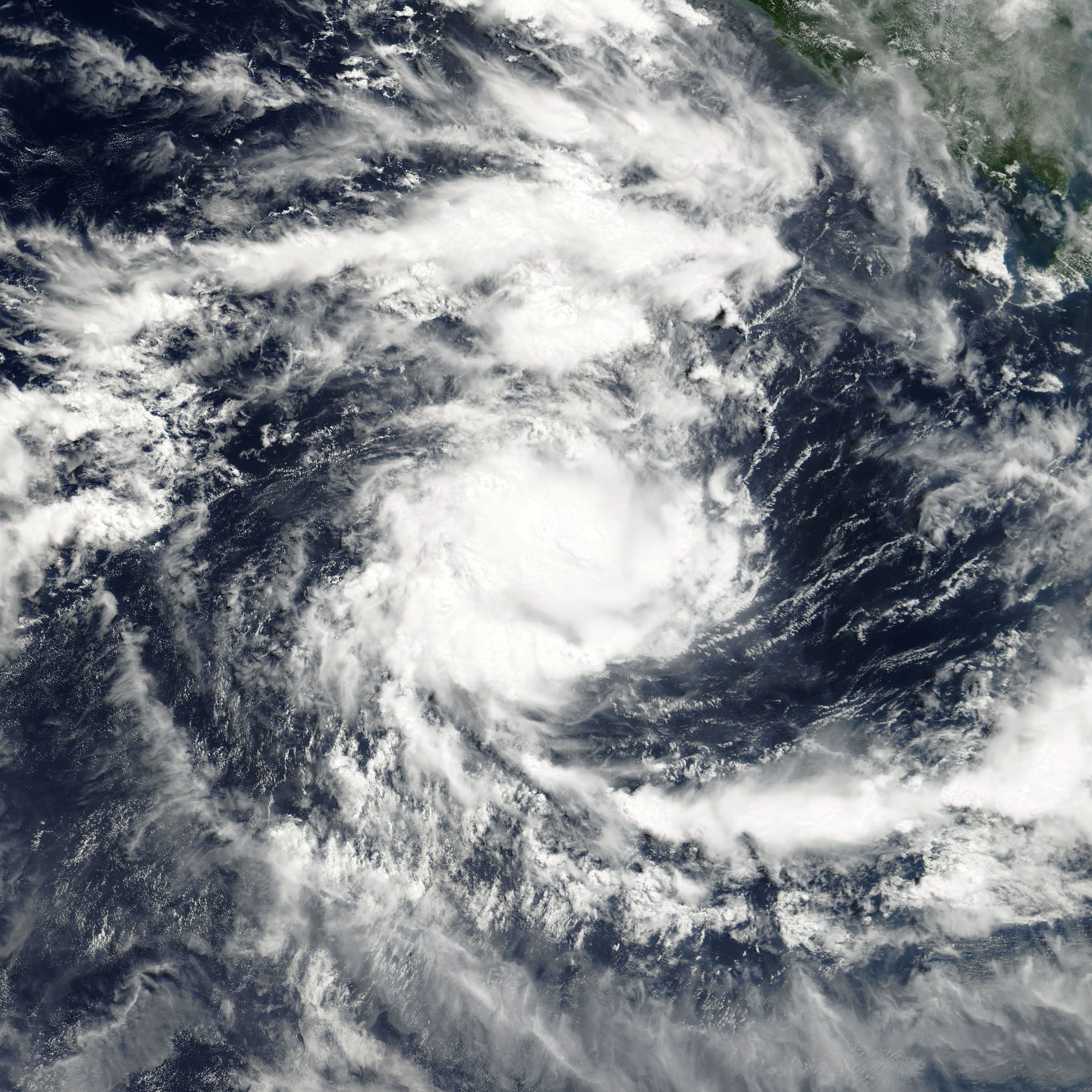
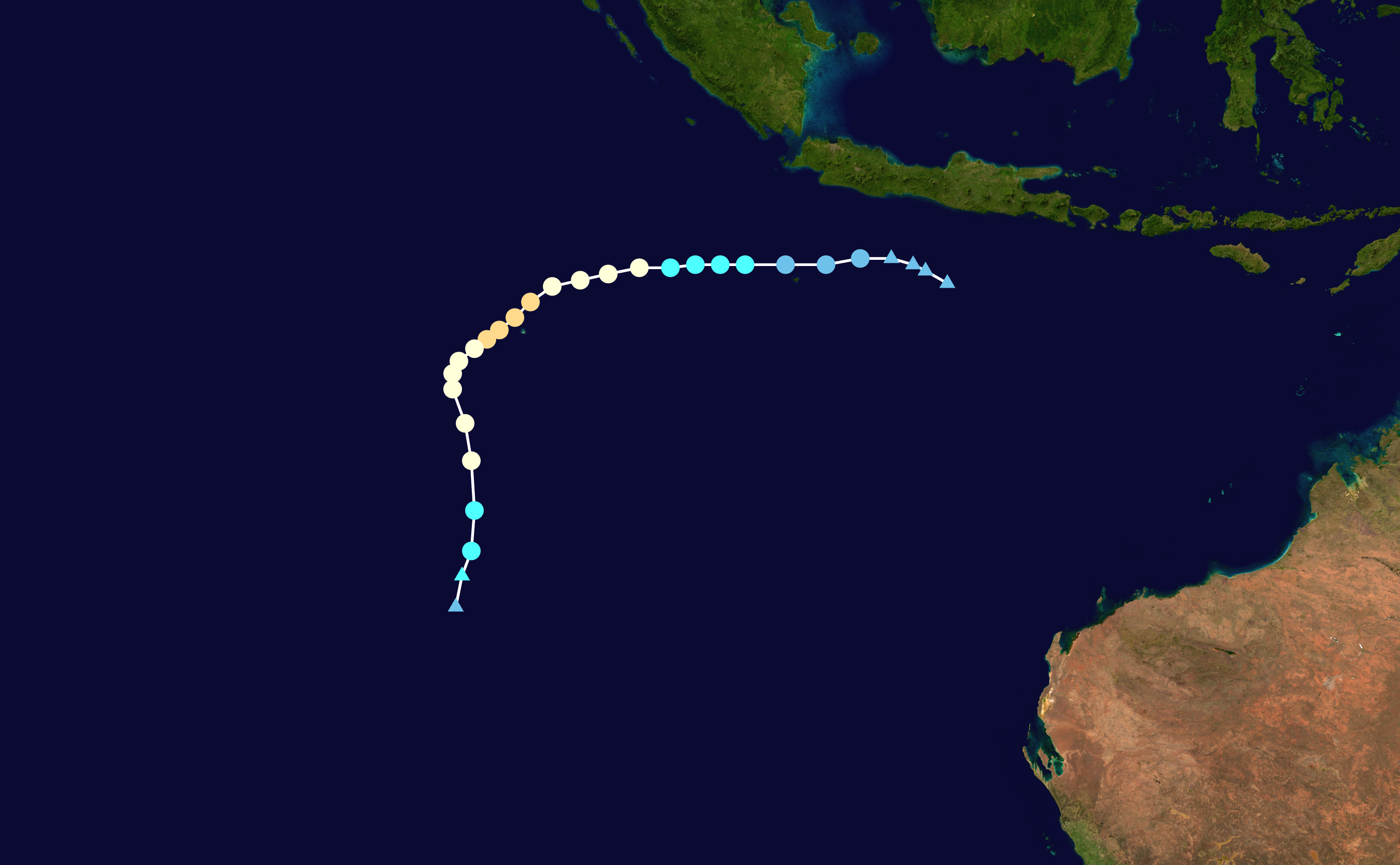
- Duration: 1 April – 8 April
- Peak intensity: 150 km/h (90 mph) (10-min); 940 hPa (mbar)

Walter was a storm that formed east of Christmas Island and tracked westward at a low latitude.

On 3 April, Cocos Island was placed under a cyclone watch as Walter approached the island. Throughout 5 April, heavy rains and high winds, estimated up to 90 km/h (56 mph) battered the area as Walter passed by the island.

=== Tropical Cyclone Alistair ===
- Category 2 tropical cyclone (Australian scale)
- Category 1 tropical cyclone (SSHWS)
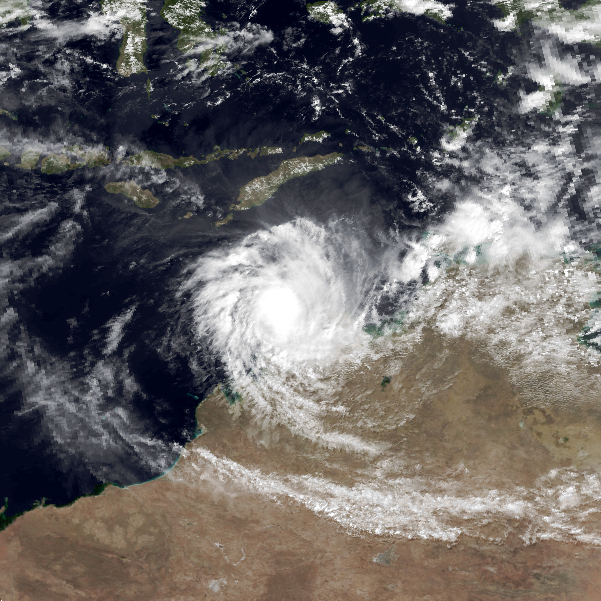
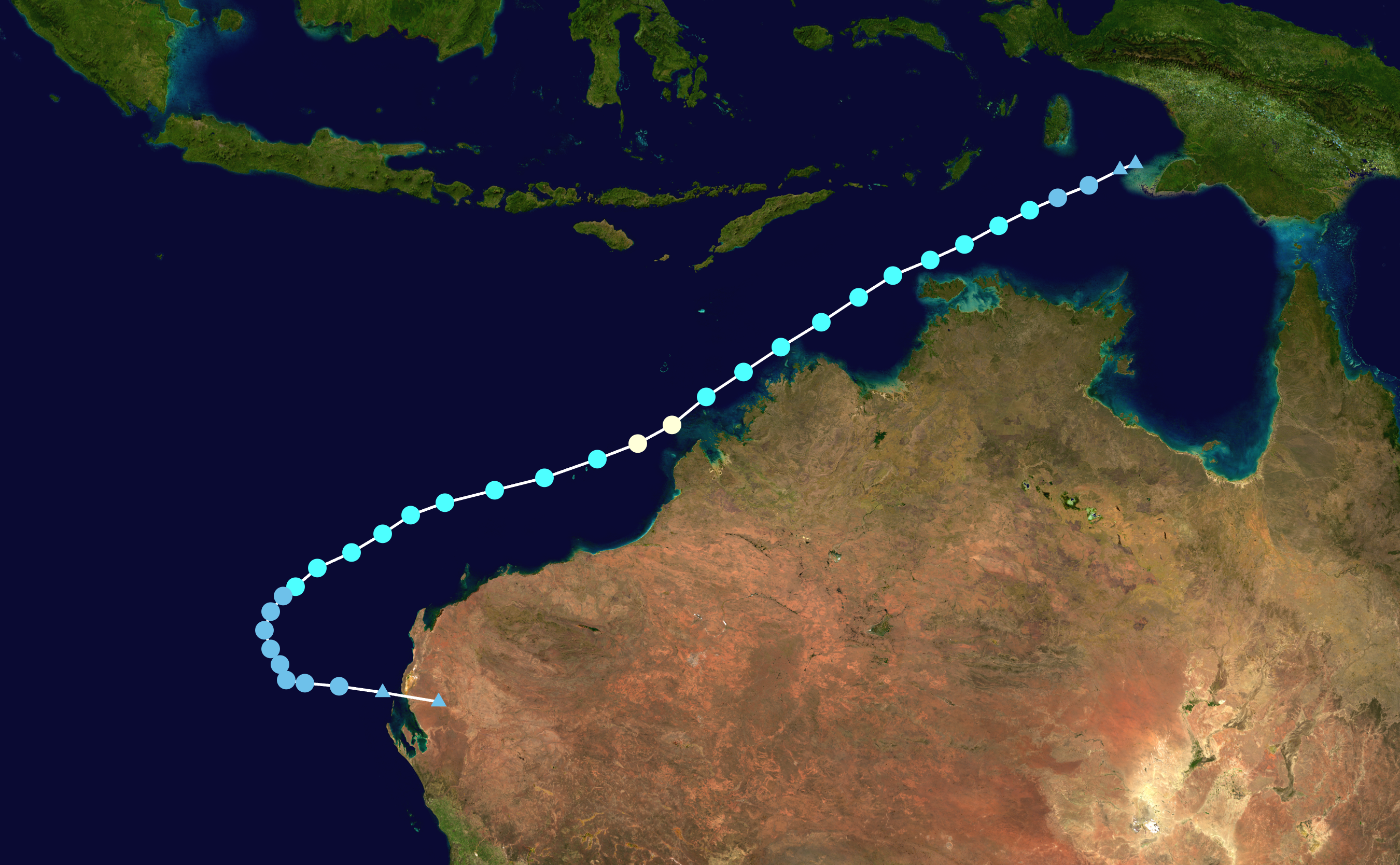
- Duration: 15 April – 23 April
- Peak intensity: 110 km/h (70 mph) (10-min); 975 hPa (mbar)

The second most damaging cyclone of the 2000–01 cyclone season, Alistair made landfall close to Carnarvon on 24 April 2001 as a poorly organized cyclone. The centre passed just to the north of town with a wind gust to 67 kilometres per hour from the northeast recorded at 4:11 am. Minimum pressure of 1002.9 hPa was recorded at 5 am, followed by the peak recorded wind gust of 90 kilometres per hour from the southeast at 6 am. A total of 24 mm of rainfall was reported in Carnarvon. Plantations to the north of Carnarvon reported 30-40% crop losses, with wind estimates of 100 to 110 kilometres per hour.

=== Other systems ===
On 28 November, a tropical low formed near Christmas Island. Moving southeastward, the low was last noted to the south-southwest of Jakarta on 30 November.

On 4 December, the TCWC Brisbane reported that a tropical low formed near the tip of the Cape York Peninsula. Moving southwestward, the primary responsibility of the tropical low was passed to the TCWC Darwin from TCWC Brisbane as the low made landfall near Alyangula. It was last noted on 6 December.

On 7 January, the TCWC Darwin reported that a tropical low developed to the north-northwest of Tiwi Islands. The low slowly moved to the south-southwest, before it was last noted while inland, near Katherine.

Another tropical low formed on 16 March near Christmas Island. Wind shear prevented further intensification, and it dissipated the next day.

On 4 April, a weak tropical low formed to the north of Nhulunbuy. It was last seen the next day.

== Storm names ==
TCWC Perth

- Sam
- Terri
- Vincent
- Walter

TCWC Darwin

- Winsome
- Alistair

TCWC Brisbane

- Wylva
- Abigail

The Bureau of Meteorology would later retire the names Sam and Abigail, replacing them with Sean and Anika respectively. Anika was first used in 2008 with Sean following later in 2010.

== Season effects ==
This is a table of all of the storms that have formed in the 2000–01 Australian region cyclone season. It includes their duration, names, landfall(s)–denoted by bold location names – damages, and death totals. Damage and deaths include totals while the storm was extratropical, a wave, or a low, and all of the damage figures are in 2001 AUD and USD.

Name	Dates	Peak intensity			Areas affected	Damage (USD)	Deaths	Ref(s).
Name	Dates	Category	Wind speed	Pressure	Areas affected	Damage (USD)	Deaths	Ref(s).
Sam	3–10 December	Category 5 severe tropical cyclone	205 km/h (125 mph)	935 hPa (27.61 inHg)	Western Australia	Minor	None	
Terri	28 January – 1 February	Category 2 tropical cyclone	110 km/h (70 mph)	975 hPa (28.79 inHg)	Western Australia	None	None	
Vincent	12 – 15 February	Category 2 tropical cyclone	100 km/h (65 mph)	980 hPa (28.94 inHg)	Western Australia	None	None	
Winsome	8 – 14 February	Category 1 tropical cyclone	75 km/h (45 mph)	981 hPa (28.97 inHg)	Northern Territory	AU$1 million	1	
Wylva	15 – 22 February	Category 1 tropical cyclone	75 km/h (45 mph)	988 hPa (29.18 inHg)	Northern Australia	AU$13 million	Unknown	
10P	16–16 February	Tropical Low	55 km/h (35 mph)	1000 hPa (29.53 inHg)	None	None	None	
Abigail	24 February – 8 March	Category 3 severe tropical cyclone	120 km/h (75 mph)	970 hPa (28.64 inHg)	Queensland, Northern Territory, Western Australia	None	None	
Walter	1–8 April	Category 3 severe tropical cyclone	150 km/h (90 mph)	940 hPa (27.75 inHg)	Cocos Islands	None	None	
Alistair	14 – 24 April	Category 2 tropical cyclone	110 km/h (70 mph)	975 hPa (28.79 inHg)	Northern Territory, Western Australia	Minor	None	
Season aggregates
9 systems	3 December – 23 April		205 km/h (125 mph)	935 hPa (27.61 inHg)		$12.8 million	2	

== See also ==
- List of Southern Hemisphere tropical cyclone seasons
- Atlantic hurricane seasons: 2000, 2001
- Pacific hurricane seasons: 2000, 2001
- Pacific typhoon seasons: 2000, 2001
- North Indian Ocean cyclone seasons: 2000, 2001
