= Daguragu, Northern Territory =

Daguragu
- Suburb
- Coordinates: 17°25′12″S 130°48′18″E
- Country: Australia
- State: Northern Territory
- LGA: Victoria Daly Region
- Location: 551 km (342 mi) S of Darwin; 460 km (290 mi) SW of Katherine
- Established: prior to 1974 (community); 4 April 2007 (locality)

Government
  - Territory electorate: Stuart
  - Federal division: Lingiari

Area
  - Total: 44.1 km^{2} (17.0 sq mi)
- Elevation: 175 m (574 ft)

Population
  - Total: 196 (2021 census)
  - Density: 4.444/km^{2} (11.51/sq mi)
- Time zone: UTC+9:30 (ACST)
- Postcode: 0852
- Mean max temp: 34.3 °C (93.7 °F)
- Mean min temp: 19.0 °C (66.2 °F)
- Annual rainfall: 682.9 mm (26.89 in)
Suburbs around Daguragu
Gurindji	Gurindji	Gurindji
Gurindji	Daguragu	Gurindji; Kalkarindji
Gurindji	Gurindji; Kalkarindji	Kalkarindji

Daguragu, previously also known as Wattie Creek by the Gurindji people as it is situated on a tributary of the Victoria River, is a locality in the Northern Territory of Australia. It is located about 551 kilometres (342 mi) south of the territory capital of Darwin and located about 460 kilometres (290 mi) south-west of the municipal seat in Katherine. It is around 8 km (5.0 mi) north-west of Kalkarindji. Daguragu community is situated on Aboriginal land held under perpetual title; it was also formerly a local government area until its amalgamation into the Victoria Daly Shire on 1 July 2008.

In 2020, a native title claim lodged in 2016 was successfully settled, giving native title rights to the Gurindji people to 5,000 square kilometres (1,900 sq mi) of the Wave Hill Station.

Being located on a floodplain, the settlement can be severely affected by flooding at times. In February 2001, two cyclones caused major flooding in the vicinity and the road between Kalkarindji and Daguragu was flooded, leaving the residents of Daguragu completely isolated for weeks. In 2023 major flooding occurred again, with hundreds of residents evacuated to Darwin and unable to return to their homes for some time.

== Governance ==
As of 2006, Daguragu Community Government Council provided "municipal and other services to the township and surrounds of Kalkarindji (formerly known as Wave Hill Welfare Settlement) and to Daguragu, a community settled on land under the Aboriginal Land Rights Act 1976. The total council area was about 3,237 square kilometres (1,250 sq mi). Kalkaringi was within a gazetted township area, with the land being leasehold under the auspices of the Northern Territory Government.

Daguragu's boundaries and name were gazetted on 4 April 2007. It is named after the Aboriginal community located within its boundaries where in 1975, then Prime Minister Gough Whitlam presented the title to the land granted to the Gurindji people following the events of the Wave Hill walk-off in 1966. As of 2020, it has an area of 44.1 square kilometres (17.0 sq mi).

Daguragu Community was amalgamated into the Victoria Daly Shire on 1 July 2008. As of 2020 Daguragu is located within the federal division of Lingiari, the territory electoral division of Stuart and the local government area of the Victoria Daly Region.

== Demographics ==
The 2016 Australian census reported that Daguragu had a population of 242 people, of whom 233 (96%) identified as Aboriginal and/or Torres Strait Islander.

== Heritage sites ==
The Wave Hill walk-off route was listed on the Northern Territory Heritage Register on 23 August 2006 and on the Australian National Heritage List on 9 August 2007. There are also seven other associated sites on the National Heritage List, of which five are in the Kalkaringi area and two within Daguragu.

== Geography and flooding ==
Daguragu is a locality located about 551 kilometres (342 mi) south of the Northern Territory capital of Darwin, and about 460 kilometres (290 mi) south-west of the municipal seat in Katherine. It lies around 8 km (5.0 mi) north-west of Kalkarindji. The settlement was formerly also known as Wattie Creek by the local Gurindji people.

Wattie Creek is a major tributary of the Victoria River, and Daguragu lies on its floodplain. It can be prone to flooding when extreme weather events occur. In February 2001, ex-tropical cyclones Winsome and Wylva caused major flooding in the vicinity, and although properties in Daguragu were not indundated (as they were in Kalkarindji), the road between the two communities was flooded and the residents of Daguragu were completely isolated for weeks.

=== 2023 flooding ===
In late February to early March 2023, heavy rains fell over the area, with Kalkarindji recording 134 mm (5.3 in) of rain in the 24 hours to 1 March. The upper Victoria River exceeded major flood levels, standing at 16.99 m (55.7 ft); the major flood stage is 14 m (46 ft). Evacuations were ordered for residents of Daguragu, Kalkarindji, Pigeon Hole, and Palumpa. An emergency was declared for district. First, Daguaragu and Pigeon Hole were fully evacuated to Kalkarindji, whence two aeroplanes of the Australian Defence Force carried evacuees out of Kalkarindji to Katherine. They then travelled by bus to Darwin, to be accommodated at the Centre of National Resilience in Howard Springs. On 7 March it was reported that it could be a month or longer before residents of some communities would be able to return home, as many houses and infrastructure had been so severely damaged by the floodwaters. Around 700 people had been evacuated, while 80 to 100 dogs had been left behind. Contractors later delivered food to the dogs.
