= Wave Hill Station =

Pastoral lease in the Northern Territory, Australia

Coordinates: 17.38698°S 131.11641°E

Location in Northern Territory

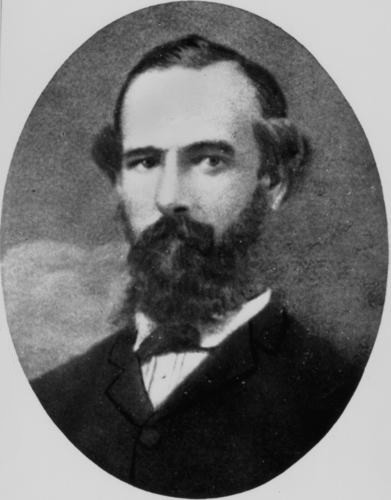
Nathaniel Buchanan, pioneer, pastoralist and explorer

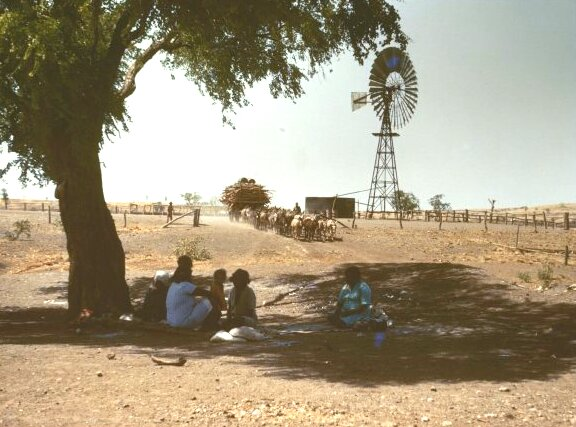
Donkey team at Wave Hill station, Northern Territory, circa 1946

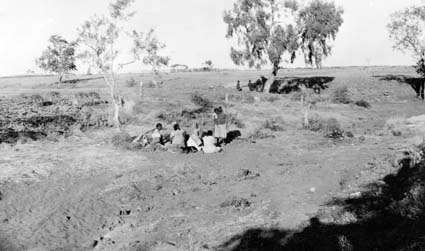
A group of Aboriginal women and children sitting in gully at Wave Hill in 1924

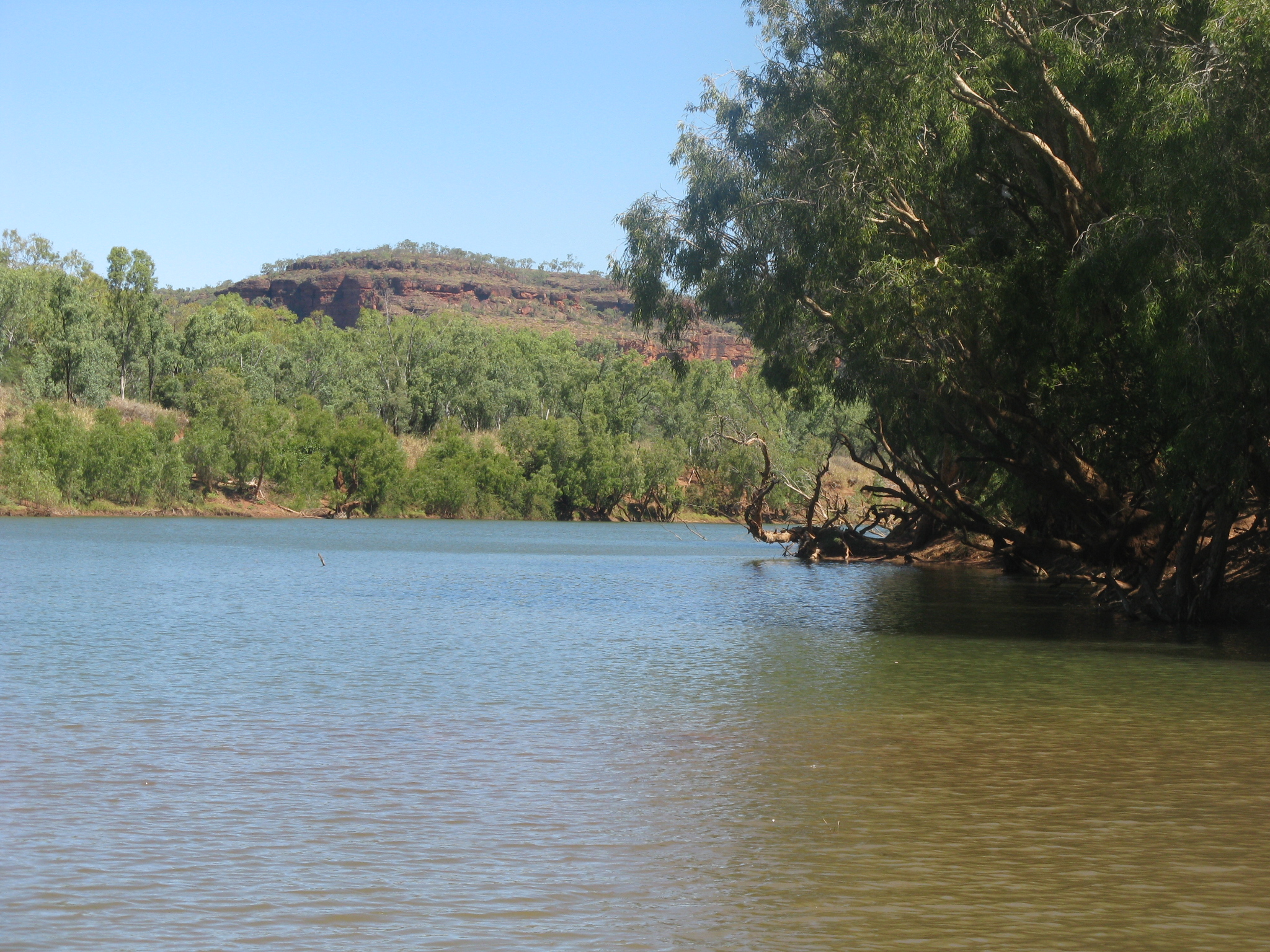
Victoria River

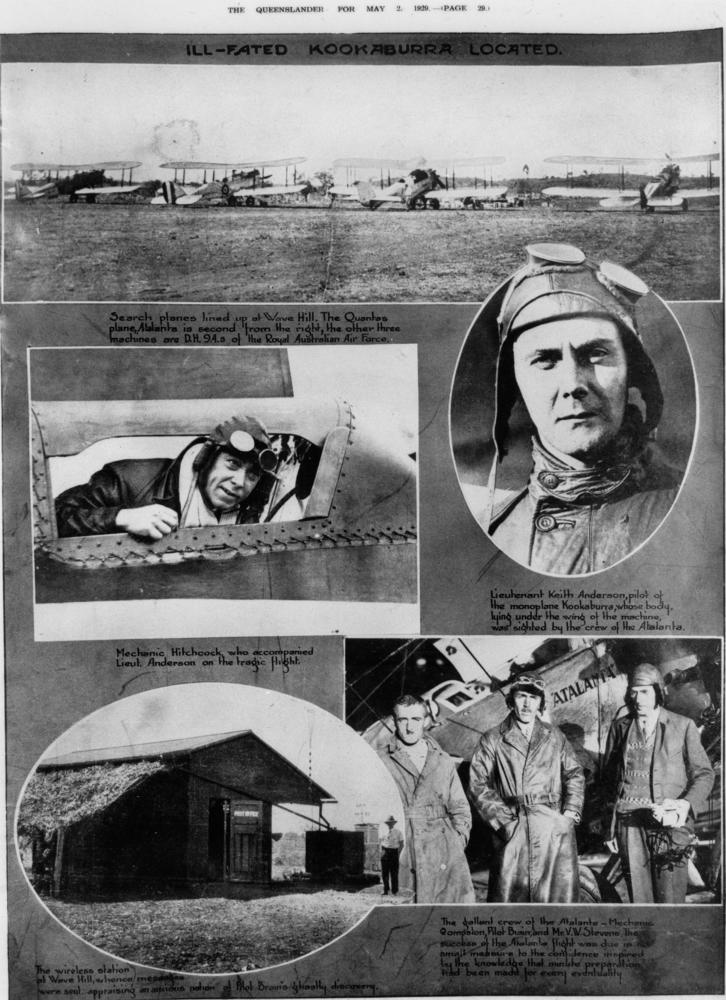
The search for the Kookaburra aeroplane, with the Wave Hill wireless station shown

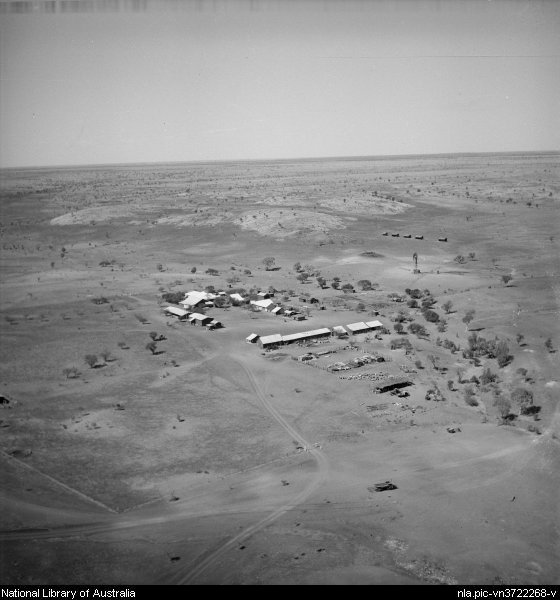
Aerial View of the station headquarters in 1952

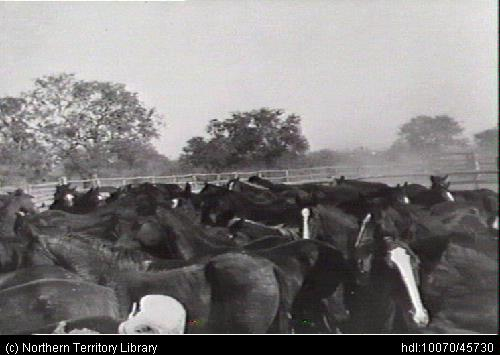
Horse muster, Wave Hill Station, ca. 1954

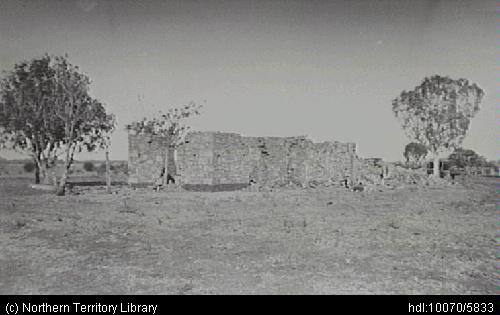
Remains of the old homestead, Wave Hill Station 1927

Wave Hill Station, most commonly referred to as Wave Hill, is a pastoral lease in the Northern Territory operating as a cattle station. The property is best known as the scene of the Wave Hill walk-off, a strike by Indigenous Australian workers for better pay and conditions, which in turn was an important influence on Aboriginal land rights in Australia.

== Description ==
Wave Hill is located about 31 kilometres (19 mi) east of Kalkaringi, 204 kilometres (127 mi) south east of Timber Creek and about 600 kilometres (373 mi) south of Darwin in the Northern Territory.

The station occupies an area of 13,500 square kilometres (5,212 sq mi) and encompasses part of the Victoria River, which bisects the station. The land is situated on high open downs with basalt plains and covered in Mitchell grass, and is well watered by the Victoria River to the west and the Camfield River to the east as well as numerous creeks.

The northern portion of the property is predominantly vertisols covered in tussock grassland. The southern portion is based mostly on kandosols with a landscape composed of open woodland to the south west and shrubland to the east with smaller areas of hummock grassland dispersed throughout.

It is bounded to the north-west by Victoria River Downs, the north-east by Camfield Station, to the east by Cattle Creek Station. Areas to the south and west are Aboriginal Land holdings.

As of August 2020 it is named Wave Hill or Wave Hill/Cattle Creek and owned by Western Grazing. It is the company's largest station, at over 12,000 square kilometres (4,600 sq mi). It uses Grey Brahman, Charolais and Charbray bulls to breed cattle. It mainly supplies the live export market, but can also move stock south into Queensland.

== History ==
The traditional owners of the lands are the Gurindji people, who have lived in the area for approximately 60,000 years.

The area was first explored by Europeans in 1854 by Augustus Charles Gregory, and later in 1879 by Alexander Forrest during his journey from the coast of Western Australia to the Overland Telegraph Line. Both Wave Hill and Victoria River Downs were established in 1883.

=== Buchanan family ===
The station was established in 1883 by Nathaniel Buchanan, who took delivery of 1,000 head of cattle in May 1884 after having some trouble finding a suitable route. Buchanan, a renowned explorer and bushman, took delivery of another 3,000 head in late 1885 that had been overlanded from Cloncurry. An employee at the station, John Holmes from Devonshire, died of sunstroke in October 1887.

By 1888, Buchanan was moving cattle off Wave Hill and to another holding, Sturt's Creek Station, where he was fattening the cattle for butchering on-site. This was providing prime fresh beef, at sixpence per pound, to the men at the nearby gold diggings and at the port at Wyndham. The station manager in 1891 was Sam Croker (also known as "Greenhide Sam") who was described as "as thorough a bushman as can be found in all of Australia". It was Croker that also provided the name of the station when he suggested it after being struck by the sharp undulations of the plateau.

Buchanan put the property up for auction in 1894, advertising the property as being 1,100 square miles (2,849 km^{2}) of high open downs, basalt plains with rich black soil covered in with Mitchell grass. Wave Hill was stocked with horses and 15,000 head of cattle, of which 8,000 bullocks were ready for market. The property was purchased by Nathaniel Buchanan's brother, William Buchanan who then suffered from a tick infestation on cattle in the area, meaning he was unable to move any stock across the Western Australian border in late 1896. The station was blamed for introducing the tick into the Kimberley after 600 cattle from the station crossed the border in 1896 and 100 had died as a result from tick or redwater.

In 1899, station manager Mr T. Cahill and his stockmen were attacked by Indigenous Australians while they were in camp while out mustering. The men had been mustering in an area where a man known as "Paddy the Lasher" had been murdered two years earlier, and once they had made camp and were sitting down to a meal several spears were thrown at them, hitting none of the men. The party made to defend themselves and the attackers scattered. Later the same year the homestead was burned to the ground. This was also blamed on an Aboriginal group who had "been pretty troublesome on the station lately". The first person to cycle around Australia, Arthur Charles Jeston Richardson, was to stop at the station during his ride, and found the burnt out building. He later came across the mustering party to give them the bad news.

By 1901, the station was carrying about 20,000 head of cattle.

20,000 head of cattle were removed from Wave Hill and overlanded to Killarney Station, near Narrabri in New South Wales, in 1904. The "remarkable droving feat" took 18 months to complete.

A droving record was set by William Philips in 1906 when he overlanded 1,260 bullocks from Wave Hill some 2,100 miles (3,380 km) to Burrendilla, near Charleville in just 32 weeks.

By 1907, Wave Hill was stocked with an estimated 58,000 head of cattle.

=== Vestey Group ===
Buchanan died in 1911 and Wave Hill was advertised to be sold by auction in February 1913. The property was advertised in 1912 as occupying an area of 10,415 square miles (26,975 km^{2}), stocked with 75,000 cattle and 1,400 horses. The property was bought the English company Union Cold Storage Company in January 1914. Union was part of the Vestey Group, a British pastoral conglomerate owned by Lord Vestey.

The station manager, Harold Seale, who had lived in the Territory for the preceding ten years, died of pneumonia and pleurisy in 1915 at 35 years of age. A subsequent manager, Oswald Quinn, died in 1921 – also at age 35 – from malaria and complications arising from the effects of gas from overseas military action.

A meat house, used for storage, was burnt down in 1921. The building was in poor condition and unhygienic.

By 1923 the size of the property was estimated at 7,900 square miles (20,461 km^{2}) and was the third largest run in the Northern Territory, the largest being Victoria River Downs, which occupied 13,100 square miles (33,929 km^{2}).

Destructive floods wreaked havoc at the station in February 1924. Following heavy rains the river rose rapidly and swept away buildings, plant and stock worth thousands of pounds. A safer site was selected and a new homestead was completed a year later.

A wireless station was constructed at the station in 1925. The set had a two kilowatt power rating and could be used to communicate with Camooweal some 500 miles (805 km) away and bigger towns such as Darwin and Townsville. The set was powered by an oil electric generator.

The explorer and author Michael Terry passed through Wave Hill as part of his expedition to drive from Broome in Western Australia to Darwin in 1927.

Following the disappearance of the Southern Cross that was piloted by Charles Kingsford Smith in early April 1929 as part of the flight from Sydney to Wyndham, messages had been sent using the Wave Hill wireless station. Several search-planes went to look for the Southern Cross, including the Kookaburra, flown by Lieutenant Keith Anderson with mechanic R. Hitchcock, which took off from Alice Springs on 10 April. The Kookaburra never landed at Wave Hill to resupply and was declared missing. The Southern Cross was found on 12 April on mudflats at the mouth of the Glenelg River in the Kimberley region of Western Australia. The wreckage of the Kookaburra was found in desert country south-east of Wave Hill on 21 April with Hitchcock's body beneath one wing and Anderson missing. Anderson's body was found a few hundred meters away.

The station was struck by drought in 1932 with many springs drying up and cattle being in poor condition. 4,200 head of Wave Hill stock had to be quarantined at Anthony's Lagoon after an outbreak of pleuro-pneumonia.

Shorthorn cattle were introduced into the herd in 1935. Sixteen bulls were brought in from Queensland and it was hoped that breeding with the shorthorn would improve the quality of the herd.

Another drought struck in 1936 when the monsoon failed to deliver any significant rain, Wave Hill lost about one quarter of its stock from lack of water and feed.

Aboriginal station workers were ready to walk off the station in 1938 as a result of a shortage of food stuffs available to them over the wet season. Potatoes, onions and other essential commodities were not supplied, in violation of the Pastoral Award. The station owners transferred the workers to other properties.

Throughout the 20th century, the station was a centre of cultural and musical exchange, as Aboriginal station workers from different language groups exchanged songs and performed wajarra (public or non-sacred songs).

Following another drought in 1954 most of the stock were droved to Helen Springs Station. Six mobs of cattle each with about 1,300 head, most of which were in very poor condition, had to make the long trek of about 400 miles (644 km) with very little grass available along the way. It was expected that only about 60% of the stock would survive the trip.

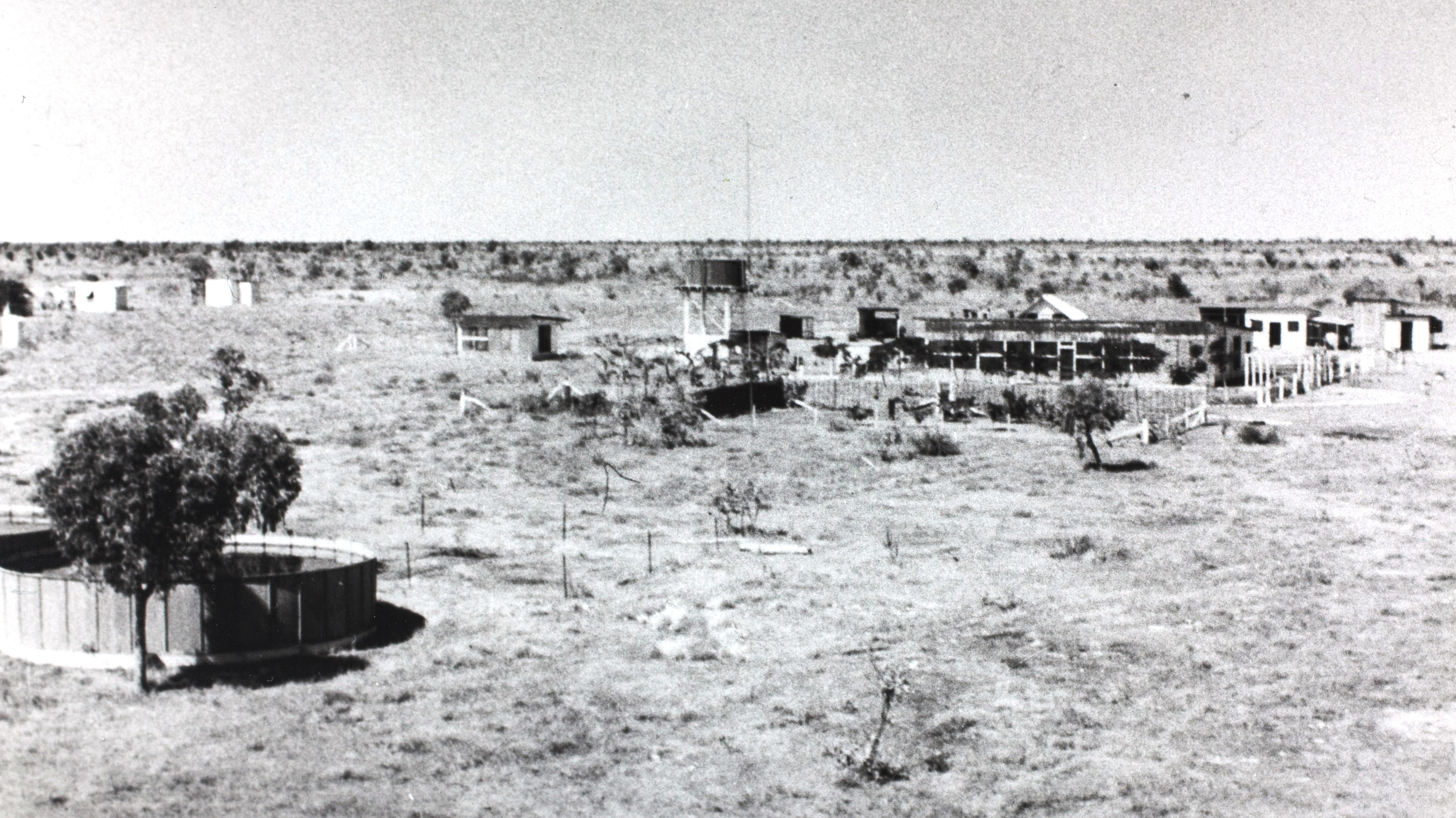
Cattle Creek outstation of Wave Hill cattle station, 1962

=== Cattle Creek ===
By the 1960s the second homestead or outstation, now known as Cattle Creek or Jinparak, was made up of the main building as well as at least 20 corrugated iron buildings as well as a number of bough sheds, a thatched meat house, several outhouses, a poultry yard, stockyards and a bore. This homestead was abandoned in 1969 with the usable buildings removed and the rest abandoned.

In 1984 the property was sub-divided into Wave Hill and Cattle Creek stations, but as of August 2020 it is shown as one property, named Wave Hill or Wave Hill/Cattle Creek.

=== Wave Hill Walk-Off ===
Wave Hill is best known for the Wave Hill walk-Off or Gurindji strike, referring to the walk-off and strike by 200 Gurindji stockmen, house servants and their families in August 1966. The strike lasted until 1975 when the federal Labor government of Gough Whitlam finally negotiated with Vesteys to give the Gurindji back a 3,236-square-kilometre (1,249 sq mi) portion of their land, a landmark in the land rights movement in Australia for Indigenous Australians.

=== Oxenford ===
Vestey Group sold its Australian pastoral holdings in early 1992. The Western Grazing company name and some of the former Vestey holdings were bought by Gambamora Industries, owned by Brian Oxenford and the Oxenford family, who have other pastoral interests. Gavin Hoad took over as station manager in 1992 and remained 18 years at the station until he resigned in 2010 after finding it too difficult to find experienced workers.

In 2007 the walk-off route was heritage listed. Parts of the route include the old Wave Hill homestead, the fence-line down to the Gordy Creek waterhole crossing, and the track to the Victoria River camp (Lipanangu) although it is now traversed by the Buchanan Highway. The route then continues to the bottom camp then turns to the Daguragu Community to the handover site at a small park near the centre of the community.

=== Top Gear ===
The BBC Television show Top Gear filmed a segment of their Season 22, episode 2 (2015) herding cattle at this station. They used a Bentley Continental GT, a BMW M6 Gran Coupe and a Nissan GTR.

=== 2020 native title determination ===
A native title claim was lodged in 2016 by the Central Land Council on behalf of the traditional owners, as there were mining interests in the area covered by Wave Hill Station's pastoral lease. On 8 September 2020, the Federal Court of Australia recognised the native title rights of the Gurindji people to 5,000 square kilometres (1,900 sq mi) of the Wave Hill Station, allowing them to receive royalties as compensation from resource companies who explore the area. Justice Richard White said that the determination recognised Indigenous involvement (Jamangku, Japuwuny, Parlakuna-Parkinykarni and Yilyilyimawu peoples) with the land "at least since European settlement and probably for millennia". The court sitting took place nearly 800 kilometres (500 mi) south of Darwin, and descendants of Lingiari and others involved in the walk-off celebrated the determination.

== Climate ==
Climate data for Wave Hill, elevation 196 m (643 ft), (1991–2020 normals, extremes 1973–2022)
Month	Jan	Feb	Mar	Apr	May	Jun	Jul	Aug	Sep	Oct	Nov	Dec	Year
Record high °C (°F)	45.0 (113.0)	44.5 (112.1)	43.5 (110.3)	40.5 (104.9)	38.3 (100.9)	36.5 (97.7)	36.6 (97.9)	38.0 (100.4)	41.5 (106.7)	45.0 (113.0)	45.6 (114.1)	45.2 (113.4)	45.6 (114.1)
Mean daily maximum °C (°F)	37.0 (98.6)	36.0 (96.8)	35.6 (96.1)	34.9 (94.8)	31.2 (88.2)	28.5 (83.3)	28.8 (83.8)	31.3 (88.3)	35.8 (96.4)	38.0 (100.4)	38.9 (102.0)	37.9 (100.2)	34.5 (94.1)
Mean daily minimum °C (°F)	24.6 (76.3)	24.0 (75.2)	22.3 (72.1)	19.2 (66.6)	15.1 (59.2)	11.8 (53.2)	11.1 (52.0)	12.5 (54.5)	18.3 (64.9)	21.8 (71.2)	24.1 (75.4)	24.7 (76.5)	19.1 (66.4)
Record low °C (°F)	15.5 (59.9)	16.4 (61.5)	11.7 (53.1)	5.0 (41.0)	3.4 (38.1)	1.3 (34.3)	0.0 (32.0)	0.1 (32.2)	6.0 (42.8)	9.4 (48.9)	12.9 (55.2)	16.1 (61.0)	0.0 (32.0)
Average rainfall mm (inches)	159.8 (6.29)	179.4 (7.06)	110.6 (4.35)	18.6 (0.73)	8.0 (0.31)	3.5 (0.14)	3.2 (0.13)	1.3 (0.05)	12.8 (0.50)	24.3 (0.96)	52.4 (2.06)	117.2 (4.61)	691.1 (27.19)
Average rainy days (≥ 1.0 mm)	10.6	10.8	6.5	1.3	1.0	0.3	0.3	0.1	0.9	3.1	5.2	9.3	49.4
Source: Australian Bureau of Meteorology

== See also ==
- List of ranches and stations
- List of the largest stations in Australia
