= Gurindji Kriol language =

Mixed Gurindji–Kriol language of Australia

Gurindji Kriol
- Region: Kalkaringi and Daguragu, Northern Territory, Australia
- Native speakers: 25 (2021 census)
- Language family: mixed Gurindji–Kriol
- Writing system: Latin

Language codes
- ISO 639-3: gjr
- Glottolog: guri1249

Gurindji Kriol is a mixed language which is spoken by Gurindji people in the Victoria River District of the Northern Territory (Australia). It is mostly spoken at Kalkaringi and Daguragu which are Aboriginal communities located on the traditional lands of the Gurindji. Related mixed varieties are spoken to the north by Ngarinyman and Bilinarra people at Yarralin and Pigeon Hole. These varieties are similar to Gurindji Kriol, but draw on Ngarinyman and Bilinarra which are closely related to Gurindji (Eastern Ngumpin languages).

Gurindji Kriol emerged in the 1970s from pervasive code-switching practices. It combines the lexicon and structure of Gurindji and Kriol. Gurindji is a highly endangered language of the Ngumpin-Yapa subgroup (Pama-Nyungan family) and Kriol is an English-lexifier creole language spoken as a first language by most Aboriginal people across northern Australia (with the exception of Arnhem Land and Daly River area).

Gurindji Kriol exhibits a structural split between the noun phrase and verb phrase, with Gurindji contributing the noun structure including case-marking, and the verb structure including tense-aspect-mood (TAM) auxiliaries coming from Kriol. In this respect, Gurindji Kriol is classified as a verb-noun (V-N) mixed language. Other examples of V-N mixed languages include Michif and Light Warlpiri. The maintenance of Gurindji within the mixed language can be seen as the perpetuation of Aboriginal identity under massive and continuing cultural incursion.

Structural feature	Language of origin	Lexical feature	Language of origin
word order	Kriol	N-body parts	Gurindji
TAM auxiliaries	Kriol	N-colours	Kriol
verb suffixes	Kriol	N-artefacts	traditional (Gurindji), new (Kriol)
case suffixes	Gurindji	N-people	Kriol/Gur
other noun suffixes	Gurindji	N-kin	parents and their siblings (Kriol), siblings, grandparents, in-laws (Gurindji)
negation	Kriol	N-food	Kriol/Gur
regular pronouns	Kriol/Gur	N-plants	Gurindji
emphatic pronouns	Gurindji	N-animals	Kriol/Gur
possessive pronouns	Gurindji	V-state	Kriol/Gur
interrogative pronouns	Kriol	V-motion	Gurindji
demonstratives	Kriol/Gur	V-bodily functions	Gurindji
conjunctions	Kriol/Gur	V-impact	Gurindji
interjections	Gurindji	V-basic	Kriol
determiners	Kriol	V-verbalising	Kriol/Gur

== Background ==
Gurindji Kriol originated from contact between non-Indigenous colonists and the Gurindji people. From 1855 onwards, the traditional lands of the Gurindji and neighbouring groups were seized by colonists who were searching for good cattle pastures. After initial attempts to cull the original inhabitants, cattle stations were set up and the remaining Gurindji people were brought to work on the stations in slave-like conditions with other Aboriginal groups. In 1966, the Gurindji initiated a workers' strike to protest against their poor conditions of employment and ultimately regain control of their traditional lands. Their campaign was called the Wave Hill Walk-off and went on for nine years, resulting in the first successful land claim by an Aboriginal group in Australia. Today the Gurindji continue to live on their traditional lands in two main communities - Kalkaringi and Daguragu.

The linguistic practices of the Gurindji are closely tied to these social circumstances. Before colonisation the Gurindji were multilingual, speaking the languages of neighbouring groups with whom they had familiar and ceremonial connections. The establishment of the cattle stations by colonisers saw the introduction of the cattle station pidgin and later Kriol into the linguistic repertoire of the Gurindji. In the 1970s Patrick McConvell observed that code-switching between Kriol and Gurindji was the dominant language practice of Gurindji people. It is likely that this code-switching and a certain amount of levelling between Gurindji and closely related neighbouring languages such as Ngarinyman and Bilinarra provided fertile ground for the formation of the mixed language. At this time, similar changes to local linguistic ecologies occurred in other places in northern Australia with Kriol becoming the dominant language in many areas such as Timber Creek and Katherine. Yet in Kalkaringi, a mixed language emerged from this situation. Felicity Meakins argues that maintenance of Gurindji elements in the mixed language relates closely to the land rights movement and can be considered an expression of the persistence of their ancestral identity. Additionally McConvell suggests that the homogeneity of the linguistic situation (one traditional language spoken at Kalkaringi) may have also aided the maintenance of Gurindji.

== Current linguistic situation ==
Gurindji Kriol is situated within a complex picture of multilingualism, contact and code-switching. Gurindji continues to be spoken by older people and a neighbouring traditional Australian language, Warlpiri is also used by people of Warlpiri heritage. Standard Australian English is the language of government services and the school, though its use is generally restricted to these domains. Kriol and Aboriginal English are spoken with Aboriginal visitors from other communities. In this respect, Gurindji Kriol continues to be spoken alongside Gurindji and Kriol, and is a 'symbiotic' mixed language. In addition, code-switching continues to be an everyday practice at Kalkaringi, and it is common to find code-switching between Gurindji and Kriol, and between Gurindji Kriol and its source languages.

== Lexicon ==
Lexically there is a mix between Kriol and Gurindji. Despite the verb-noun structural split, some verbs are derived from Kriol and others from Gurindji. Similarly nouns from both languages are present. In general, based on a 200 word Swadesh list, 36.6% of vocabulary is derived from Kriol and 35% finds its origins in Gurindji. The remaining 28.4% are synonymous forms from both languages, where the choice of word depends on a number of factors including the interlocutors. For example, more Gurindji vocabulary is used when addressing older Gurindji people or in the presence of outsiders. Some lexical specialisation can be noted, for example karnti which means "branch", "stick" or "tree" in Gurindji is generally only used to mean "branch" or "stick" in Gurindji Kriol whereas the Kriol form tri is used to mean "tree".

== Phonology ==
The phonological system of Gurindji Kriol is relatively stratified, i.e. it has maintained separate Gurindji and Kriol phoneme inventories, syllable structures and many phonological processes.

In terms of vowels, Gurindji Kriol has a 5 vowel system. All Gurindji words contain only 3 vowel phonemes /ɪ/, /ɐ/ and /ʊ/ with diphthongs the result of combinations of vowels with glides in fast speech, for example /ɐw/ > [ɐʊ]. Kriol words make use of five vowel phonemes /ɛ/ and /ɔ/ in addition to /ɪ/, /ɐ/ and /ʊ/, plus diphthongs and long vowels.

	Front	Central	Back
Close	i		u
Mid	e		ɔ
Open		a	

The consonant inventory is a complex fusion of Gurindji and Kriol consonants. Words of Gurindji origin contain a three-way coronal contrast for stops, nasals and laterals, and a distinction between a post-alveolar rhotic and an apical trill (sometimes pronounced as a tap). Kriol-derived words contrast with those from Gurindji in containing fricatives. No voicing distinction is made for stops or fricatives in either Gurindji- or Kriol-derived words; voicing depends on position within word or utterance, and place of articulation.

	Bilabial	Alveolar	Post-alveolar	Alveopalatal	Velar
Stop	p	t	ʈ	ɟ	k
Fricative	f	s		ʃ	
Nasal	m	n	ɳ	ɲ	ŋ
Lateral		l	ɭ	ʎ	
Rhotic		r, ɹ	ɻ		
Glide				j	w

Stress is word initial for words of both Gurindji and Kriol origin. The maintenance of the two phonological systems is more obvious in syllable structure. A range of structures are permissible in words of both origins, e.g. CV and CVC, however VC syllables are only allowed in Kriol words. Gurindji and Kriol source words also diverge in their use of stop-final consonant clusters. Gurindji words allows syllable-final consonant clusters, though the cluster combination is rather restricted. The first consonant must be a liquid and the final consonant, a non-coronal stop or velar nasal. Even in the more acrolectal forms of Kriol words, final consonant clusters are never present at the surface level. Finally different phonological processes apply to the different component languages of Gurindji Kriol. For example, in Kriol words, the plosive series is occasionally hypercorrected to fricatives of a similar place of articulation. This process never occurs in words of Gurindji origin.

== Noun phrase ==
The Gurindji Kriol noun phrase consists of a head plus a number of potential modifiers. Potential heads are: nouns, nominalised adjectives, emphatic pronouns and demonstratives (this/that); and modifiers are determiners (in/definite, plural/singular) and adjectives. Heads and modifiers can be distinguished by their ability to take case marking. Heads are case-marked, and modifiers are not. The order of noun phrase constituents is relatively fixed: DET - MOD - HEAD. Finally Gurindji Kriol is an optional ergative language where the transitive subject is optionally marked ergative and objects are unmarked.

dat yapakayi karu-ngku i bin gon ged-im-bat dat karu
the small child-ERG 3SG.SBJ PST go get-TR-PROG the child
"The small kid goes to get the (other) kid."
green words are Gurindji-derived, and purple words are Kriol-derived

Gurindji Kriol contains many nominal suffixes, most of which are derived from Gurindji. These include case suffixes, number marking and derivational morphology. A number of these suffixes have Kriol-derived periphasic counterparts. For example, the privative suffix -murlung can also be expressed by gat no 'has no'.

Type	Form	Origin	Type	Form	Origin
Ergative	-ngku, -tu	Gurindji	And	-purrupurru	Gurindji
Locative	-ngka, -ta	Gurindji	Privative	-murlung	Gurindji
Dative	-yu, -wu, -ku	Gurindji	Comparative	-marraj	Gurindji
Allative	-ngkirri, -jirri	Gurindji	Factive	-k	Gurindji
Ablative	-nginyi(ng)	Gurindji	Alone	-wariny(j)	Gurindji
Comitative	-jawung, -yawung	Gurindji	Another	-kari	Gurindji
Plural	-rrat	Gurindji	Nominaliser	-wan	Kriol
Dual	-kujarra	Gurindji	Adjective	-bala	Kriol
Paucal	-walija	Gurindji	Focus	=na	Kriol
Associative	-nganyjuk, -mob	Gur/Kriol	Topic	=ma	Gurindji
Dual Assoc	-kuwang	Gurindji	Restrictive	=rni	Gurindji

== Pronouns ==
Regular pronouns distinguish person (1st, 2nd and 3rd) and number (singular, dual and plural), and further make a distinction between inclusive and exclusive 1st person pronouns, though syncretism exists between subject forms. All subject pronouns are derived from Kriol and object pronouns find their origins in both languages. A general reflexive/reciprocal pronoun is derived from the Kriol reflexive pronoun. Emphatic pronouns are derived from Gurindji and are classified as nominals because they can be case-marked. Possessive pronouns are drawn from Gurindji and are also used as dative objects, e.g. nyununy 'your, to you'. (Note that this paradigm needs some work).

			Subject	Object	Emphatic	Possessive
1st person	singular	exclusive	ai	ngayu	ngayu	ngayiny
1st person	singular	inclusive	wi	ngali	ngali	
1st person	plural	exclusive	wi	ngaliwa	ngaliwa	ngaliwany
1st person	plural	inclusive	wi	ngantipa	ngantipa	ngantipany
2nd person	singular		yu	yu	nyuntu	nyununy
2nd person	dual		yutu(bala)	yutu(bala)		
2nd person	plural		yumob	yumob	nyurru(lu)	nyurruluny
3rd person	singular		i	im	nyantu	nyanuny
3rd person	dual		tu(bala)	tu(bala)		
3rd person	plural		dei	dem	nyarru(lu)	nyarruluny
reflexive/reciprocal				mijelp		

== Verb phrase ==
The verb phrase consists of a tense auxiliary_{1} followed by a modal auxiliary_{2} and the main verb_{3}. The auxiliary verbs are derived from Kriol and the main verb can come from either Gurindji or Kriol:

i bin_{1} labta_{2} ged-im_{3} im nyanuny mami-ngku na
3SG.SBJ PST MOD get-TR 3SG.OBJ 3SG.DAT mother-ERG FOC
"His mother had to get him."
green words are Gurindji-derived, and purple words are Kriol-derived

Gurindji Kriol distinguishes between past (bin) and present tense (zero-marked for nouns, -m for pronouns) and marks future time using a potential marker (garra) which is also used to express obligation. Many of the auxiliaries also have reduced forms which attach to subject pronouns, such as ai-rra > ai garra 'I will'.

Category	Form	Etymology	Function
tense	bin, in	been	past
	-m	I'm, am	present
	-l	I'll, will	future
aspect	olweis	always	present habitual
	yusta	used to	past habitual
	til	still	progressive
	stat	start	inceptive
modal	garra, -rra	got to	potential
	beta	had better	necessative
	haba	have a	
	habta, labta	have to	necessative
	kan	can	ability
	shud	should	possibility
	traina	trying to	attempt
	wana, -na	wanna, want to	desire
voice	ø		active
	git	get	passive
negation	don	don't	imperative
	kaan	can't	ability/permission
	neba	never	simple
	top	stop	imperative
	not	not	simple

Bound verbal morphology is also predominantly Kriol-derived.

Category	Form	Etymology	Function
adverbial	-abat	about	idiosyncratic
	-abta	after	idiosyncratic
	-an	on	spatial, inceptive
	-ap	up	space, telic
	-(a)ran	around	spatial
	-(a)wei	away	spatial
	-at	out	telic
	-bek	back	spatial, telic
	-dan	down	spatial
	-oba	over	spatial, telic
	-op	off	telic
progressive	-in	-ing	lexicalised
	-bat	about	Kriol trans verbs
	-karra	Gurindji	in/trans verbs
	-ta	Gurindji	intrans verbs
transitive	-im	him, them	Kriol trans verbs

== Simple sentences ==
Verbless clauses:

Ascriptive clauses consist of a subject noun and nominalised adjective.

ankaj dat karu im yapakayi-wan
poor.thing the child 3SG small-NMLZ
"Poor thing, that child is only a baby."
green words are Gurindji-derived, and purple words are Kriol-derived

Existential clauses contain a subject with locative phrase.

dat warlaku im andanith jiya-ngka
the dog 3SG underneath chair-LOC
"The dog is underneath the chair."

Possessive constructions consist of a nominal acting as a predicates, taking another nominal argument. In these clauses the head is marked dative. Inalienable nominals (body parts and kinship) are only optionally marked dative.

wartarra yu bin kirt dat ngakparn-ku hawuj
hey 2SG PST break the frog-DAT house
"Hey you broke the frog's home (the bottle)."

Verbal clauses:

Intransitive clauses consist of a verb and a subject with no object. Adjuncts may be added to express the location or time of an action.

warlaku i=m makin atsaid shop-ta
dog 3SG.SBJ=PRS sleep outside shop-LOC
"A dog sleeps outside the shop."

Transitive clauses consist of an optionally-ergative marked subject (66.5%) and an absolutive object. Word order is predominately SVO (87.6%) and the ergative marker is more likely to appear when the agent nominal is postverbal.

an kengkaru i bin kil-im kurrupartu-yawung dat karu-ngku
and kangaroo 3SG.S PST hit-TR boomerang-COM the child-ERG
"And the kangaroo he hit with a boomerang, the child did."

Semi-transitive clauses are composed of an optionally-ergative marked subject and a dative object.

naja-wan kajirri jing-in-at-karra bo nyanuny karu
another-NMLZ old.woman call.out-PROG-out-PROG DAT 3SG.DAT child
"Another woman calls out to her child."

Ditransitive clauses consist of an accusative object and dative indirect object, and alternate with a clause with two accusative objects.

dat malyju gib-it dat man jumok
the boy give-TR the man cigarette
"The boy gives the man a cigarette."

Passive clauses consist of an auxiliary verb git (< get) and the loss of the transitive marker from the main verb. The agent also loses ergative case marking as an adjunct and acquires ablative case instead.

man i bin get bait warlaku-nginyi wartan-ta
man 3SG.SBJ PST get bite dog-ABL hand-LOC
"The man got bitten by a dog on the hand."

== Complex sentences ==
Conjoined clauses are often zero-marked such as the following sentence which was uttered within one prosodic contour. The link between the clauses is implied.

[warlaku i-m lungkarra-karra nganta] [i-m tai-im-ap nyantu kuya nek-ta]
dog 3SG.S-PRS cry-PROG DUB 3SG.S-PRS tie-TR-up 3SG thus neck-LOC
"The dog might be crying (because) he tied him up by the neck like that."

A number of Kriol-derived conjunctions can be used to join verbal or nominal clauses such as an (and) and o (or). Others are only used to relate verbal clauses such as dumaji (because), bikos (because), bat (but), ib (if), den (then).

dat marluka bin trai jidan jiya-ngka bat i bin kirt
the old.man PST MOD sit chair-LOC but 3SG.SBJ PST break
"The old man tried to sit on the chair but it broke."

Subordination is mostly performed by marking the verb in the subordinate clause with a case-marker. This style of subordination is derived from Gurindji. For example, the locative marker can be used in a switch reference construction to indicate that the agent of the subordinate clause is the same as the object of the main clause.

wan karu-ngku i gib-it la-im keik kajirri-yu makin-ta
a child-ERG 3SG.SBJ give-TR OBL-3SG.O cake woman-DAT lie-LOC
"A child gives a cake to the woman who is lying down."

Gurindji Kriol also contains asymmetrical serial verb constructions. There are three potential parts to the asymmetrical serial verb construction: auxiliary_{1}, minor verb_{2} and main verb_{3}.

i garra_{1} put-im_{2} makin_{3} yard-ta
3SG.SBJ POT put-TR lie.down yard-LOC
He will lay him down in the yard.
