= Gurindji =

Gurindji may refer to:

- Gurindji, Northern Territory, a locality in Australia
- Gurindji people, an Australian Aboriginal people
  - Gurindji language, the language of the Gurindji people
  - Gurindji Kriol language, the main language now spoken by Gurindji people
- The Gurindji strike, also known as the Wave Hill walk-off, a 1966 strike by Gurindji workers at a cattle station
