= Yarralin, Northern Territory =

Yarralin (Aboriginal Community)
- Coordinates: 16°26′49″S 130°53′00″E
- Country: Australia
- State: Northern Territory
- LGA: Victoria Daly Region
- Location: 390 km (240 mi) SW of Katherine; 705 km (438 mi) S of Darwin

Government
  - Territory electorate: Gwoja
  - Federal division: Lingiari

Population
  - Total: 293 (2016 census)
- Postcode: 0852

Yarralin (Yařaliń/Yarraliny) also known as Walangeri, is a remote Aboriginal community in the Northern Territory of Australia. At the 2016 census, Yarralin had a population of 293. The community is located on the banks of the Wickham River, about 15 km (9 mi) west of Victoria River Downs, a major cattle station along the Buchanan Highway.

The community is diverse, with several Indigenous language groups including Gurindji, Ngarinyman (Traditional Owners), Bilinara and Mudburra represented among the residents of Yarralin. Archeological evidence and oral histories of the area surrounding the modern community indicate that Yarralin was (and remains) an important link in a traditional network for trade and exchange of goods and culture between indigenous peoples across the Northern Territory. Westside Kriol is also spoken in the community.

Yarralin is a service centre for the surrounding area and facilities available in the community include a school, health clinic, post office, police station, airstrip, community store and sports fields.
