= Karrangpurru =

North Australian ethnic group

The Karrangpurru are an Aboriginal Australian people of the Northern Territory. They suffered severe population loss very early on in the period of colonial expropriations of their land.

== Language and ethnonym ==
Karrangpurru is believed to have belonged to the eastern Ngumpin branch of the Ngumpin-Yapa languages. Nothing is known of their language, Karranga, since its many of its speakers were wiped out without any items from it being recorded. Patrick McConvell has suggested it may have been a dialect of Mudburra. They were also known as the Karranga. The form Karrangpurru registered by David Horton, is formed from that word and the familiar suffix -purru.

== Country ==
Norman Tindale completely missed noticing the Karrangpurru. The Karrangpurru lived to the north of the Bilinara and [Victoria River Downs Station] was established both on Bilingara and Karrangpurru lands. It has been argued that with regard succession claims to an area south-east of the Karrangpuru, that the notion of tribal boundaries ignores the fact that Peter Sutton has argued that Dreaming narratives of landscape creation can overlap in different languages spoken by neighbouring peoples.

== History of contact ==
Karrangpurru lands were subsumed into the Victoria River Downs Station when it was established in 1883. A combination of massacres and the impact of diseases introduced by whites penetrating their country effectively decimated the population. A handful of people belonging to one family claim that they have Karrangpurru heritage by descent.
