= Personal pronoun =

Pronoun that is associated with a particular grammatical person

Personal pronouns are pronouns that are associated primarily with a particular grammatical person – first person (as I), second person (as you), or third person (as she, it, he). Personal pronouns may also take different forms depending on number (usually singular or plural), grammatical or natural gender, case, and formality. The term "personal" is used here purely to signify the grammatical sense; personal pronouns are not limited to people and can also refer to animals and objects (as the English personal pronoun it usually does).

The re-use in some languages of one personal pronoun to indicate a second personal pronoun with formality or social distance – commonly a second person plural to signify second person singular formal – is known as the T–V distinction, from the Latin pronouns tu and vos. Examples are the majestic plural in English and the use of vous in place of tu in French.

For specific details of the personal pronouns used in the English language, see English personal pronouns.

== Types and forms ==
=== Pronoun vs pro-form ===
Pronoun is a category of words. A pro-form is a type of function word or expression that stands in for (expresses the same content as) another word, phrase, clause or sentence where the meaning is recoverable from the context. Pronouns mostly function as pro-forms, but there are pronouns that are not pro-forms and pro-forms that are not pronouns.^{[p. 239]}

1. It's a good idea. (pronoun and pro-form)
2. It's raining. (pronoun but not pro-form)
3. I asked her to help, and she did so right away. (pro-form but not pronoun)

In [1], the pronoun it "stands in" for whatever was mentioned and is a good idea. In [2], the pronoun it doesn't stand in for anything. No other word can function there with the same meaning; we don't say "the sky is raining" or "the weather is raining". So, it is a pronoun but not a pro-form. Finally, in [3], did so is a verb phrase, not a pronoun, but it is a pro-form standing for "help".

=== Person and number ===
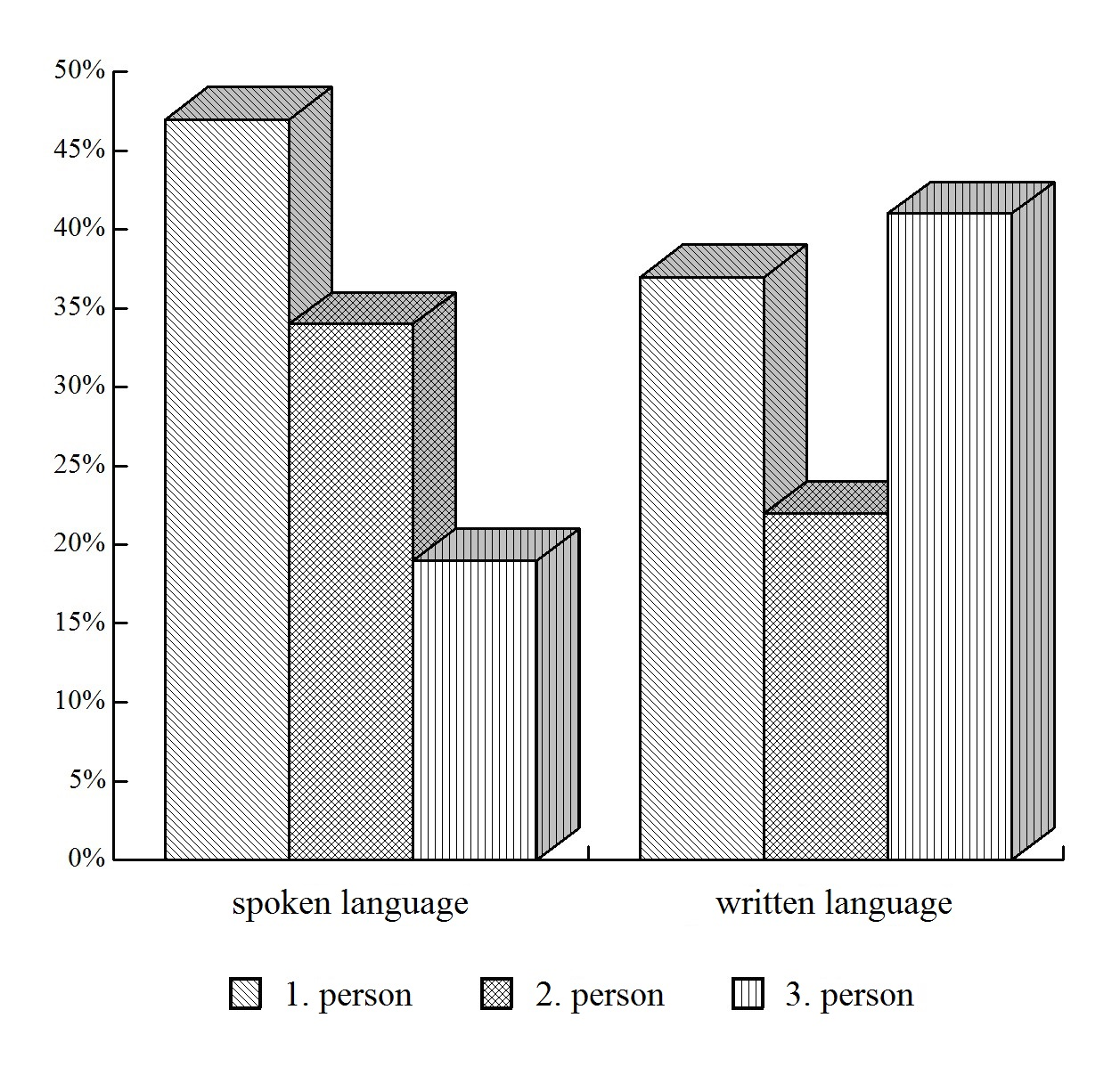
Frequency of personal pronouns in Serbo-Croatian

Languages typically have personal pronouns for each of the three grammatical persons:

- first-person pronouns normally refer to the speaker, in the case of the singular (as the English I), or to the speaker and others, in the case of the plural (as the English we).
- second-person pronouns normally refer to the person or persons being addressed (as the English you); in the plural they may also refer to the person or persons being addressed together with third parties.
- third-person pronouns normally refer to third parties other than the speaker or the person being addressed (as the English he, she, it, they).

As noted above, within each person there are often different forms for different grammatical numbers, especially singular and plural. Languages which have other numbers, such as dual (e.g. Slovene), may also have distinct pronouns for these.

Some languages distinguish between inclusive and exclusive first-person plural pronouns – those that do and do not include their audience. For example, Tok Pisin has seven first-person pronouns according to number (singular, dual, trial, plural) and clusivity, such as mitripela ("they two and I") and yumitripela ("you two and I").

Some languages do not have third-person personal pronouns, instead using demonstratives (e.g. Macedonian) or full noun phrases. Latin used demonstratives rather than third-person pronouns (in fact the third-person pronouns in the Romance languages are descended from the Latin demonstratives).

In some cases personal pronouns can be used in place of indefinite pronouns, referring to someone unspecified or to people generally. In English and other languages the second-person pronoun can be used in this way: instead of the formal one should hold one's oar in both hands (using the indefinite pronoun one), it is more common to say you should hold your oar in both hands.

=== Gender ===
In many languages, personal pronouns, particularly those of the third person, differ depending on the gender of their antecedent or referent. This occurs in English with the third-person singular pronouns, where (simply put) he is used when referring to a man, she to a woman, singular they to a person whose gender is unknown or unspecified at the time that the pronoun is being used or to a person who does not identify as either a man or a woman, and it to something inanimate or an animal of unspecific sex. This is an example of pronoun selection based on natural gender; many languages also have selection based on grammatical gender (as in French, where the pronouns il and elle are used with masculine and feminine antecedents respectively, as are the plurals ils and elles). Sometimes natural and grammatical gender do not coincide, as with the German noun Mädchen ("girl"), which is grammatically neuter but naturally feminine. (See Grammatical gender § Grammatical vs. natural gender for more details.)

Issues may arise when the referent is someone of unspecified or unknown gender. In a language such as English, it is derogatory to use the inanimate pronoun it to refer to a person (except in some cases to a small child), and although it is traditional to use the masculine he to refer to a person of unspecified gender, the movement towards gender-neutral language requires that another method be found, such as saying he or she. A common solution, particularly in informal language, is to use singular they. For more details see Gender in English.

Similar issues arise in some languages when referring to a group of mixed gender; these are dealt with according to the conventions of the language in question (in French, for example, the masculine ils "they" is used for a group containing both men and women or antecedents of both masculine and feminine gender).

A pronoun can still carry gender even if it does not inflect for it; for example, in the French sentence je suis petit ("I am small") the speaker is male and so the pronoun je is masculine, whereas in je suis petite the speaker is female and the pronoun is treated as feminine, the feminine ending -e consequently being added to the predicate adjective.

On the other hand, many languages do not distinguish female and male in the third person pronoun.

Some languages have or had a non-gender-specific third person pronoun:

- Malay (including Indonesian and Malaysian standards), Malagasy of Madagascar, Philippine languages, Māori, Rapa Nui, Hawaiian, and other Austronesian languages
- Chinese, Burmese, and other Sino-Tibetan languages
- Vietnamese and other Mon–Khmer languages
- Igbo, Yoruba, and other Volta-Niger languages
- Swahili, and other Bantu languages
- Haitian Creole
- Turkish and other Turkic languages
- Luo and other Nilo-Saharan languages
- Hungarian, Finnish, Estonian, and other Uralic languages
- Hindi-Urdu
- Georgian
- Japanese
- Armenian
- Korean
- Mapudungun
- Basque
- Persian

Some of these languages started to distinguish gender in the third person pronoun due to influence from European languages.
Mandarin, for example, introduced, in the early 20th century a different character for she (她) and in 2025 a gender neutral character (a composition of ㄨ and 也). The three forms are pronounced identically as he (他) and thus are still indistinguishable in speech (tā).

Korean geunyeo (그녀) is found in writing to translate "she" from European languages. In the spoken language it still sounds awkward and rather unnatural, as it literally translates to "that female".

=== Formality ===
Many languages have different pronouns, particularly in the second person, depending on the degree of formality or familiarity. It is common for different pronouns to be used when addressing friends, family, children and animals than when addressing superiors and adults with whom the speaker is less familiar. Examples of such languages include French, where the singular tu is used only for familiars, the plural vous being used as a singular in other cases (Russian follows a similar pattern); German, where the third-person plural sie (capitalized as Sie) is used as both singular and plural in the second person in non-familiar uses; and Polish, where the noun pan ("gentleman") and its feminine and plural equivalents are used as polite second-person pronouns. For more details, see T–V distinction.

Some languages, such as Japanese, Korean and many Southeast Asian languages like Vietnamese, Thai, and Indonesian, have pronouns that reflect deep-seated societal categories. In these languages there is generally a small set of nouns that refer to the discourse participants, but these referential nouns are not usually used (pronoun avoidance), with proper nouns, deictics, and titles being used instead (and once the topic is understood, usually no explicit reference is made at all). A speaker chooses which word to use depending on the rank, job, age, gender, etc. of the speaker and the addressee. For instance, in Japanese, in formal situations, adults usually refer to themselves as watashi or the even more polite watakushi, while young men may use the student-like boku and police officers may use honkan ("this officer"). In informal situations, women may use the colloquial atashi, and men may use the rougher ore.

=== Case ===
Pronouns also often take different forms based on their syntactic function, and in particular on their grammatical case. English distinguishes the nominative form (I, you, he, she, it, we, they), used principally as the subject of a verb, from the oblique form (me, you, him, her, it, us, them), used principally as the object of a verb or preposition. Languages whose nouns inflect for case often inflect their pronouns according to the same case system; for example, German personal pronouns have distinct nominative, genitive, dative and accusative forms (ich, meiner, mir, mich; etc.). Pronouns often retain more case distinctions than nouns – this is true of both German and English, and also of the Romance languages, which (with the exception of Romanian) have lost the Latin grammatical case for nouns, but preserve certain distinctions in the personal pronouns.

Other syntactic types of pronouns which may adopt distinct forms are disjunctive pronouns, used in isolation and in certain distinct positions (such as after a conjunction like and), and prepositional pronouns, used as the complement of a preposition.

=== Strong and weak forms ===
Some languages have strong and weak forms of personal pronouns, the former being used in positions with greater stress. Some authors further distinguish weak pronouns from clitic pronouns, which are phonetically less independent.

Examples are found in Polish, where the masculine third-person singular accusative and dative forms are jego and jemu (strong) and go and mu (weak). English has strong and weak pronunciations for some pronouns, such as them (pronounced /ðɛm/ when strong, but /ðəm/, /ɛm/, /əm/ or even /m̩/ when weak).

=== Free vs. bound pronouns ===
Some languages—for instance, most Australian Aboriginal languages—have distinct classes of free and bound pronouns. These are distinguished by their morphological independence/dependence on other words respectively. In Australian languages, it is common for free pronouns to be reserved exclusively for human (and sometimes other animate) referents. Examples of languages with animacy restrictions on free pronouns include Wanyjirra, Bilinarra, Warrongo, Guugu Yimidhirr and many others. Bound pronouns can take a variety of forms, including verbal prefixes (these are usually subject markers—see Bardi—but can mark objects as well—see Guniyandi), verbal enclitics (including possessive markers) and auxiliary morphemes. These various forms are exemplified below:

Free pronoun (Wangkatja)

Nyimu-lu palu-nya patjar-nu
dog-ERG 3-ABS bite-PST
'The dog bit it'

Verb prefix (Bardi)

i- ng- jalgoo -ij
3- PST- fall -PFV
'he/she/it fell.'

Enclitic (Ngiyambaa)

ngunhi=lu=na ngadhi
gave=3.ERG=3.ABS 1SG.OBL
'He gave it to me'

Auxiliary morpheme (Wambaya)

ya-ni ka-lu
go-NPST PRS-3PL.S
'They go/they are going.'

Possessive clitic (Ngaanyatjarra)

Kuka-tju mantjila purnpurntu-tju purrururruritjunku-tjaku
meat-1SG get fly-ERG blow.it-lest
Get my meat so that the flies won't blow it

=== Reflexive and possessive forms ===
Languages may also have reflexive pronouns (and sometimes reciprocal pronouns) closely linked to the personal pronouns. English has the reflexive forms myself, yourself, himself, herself, themself, theirself, itself, ourselves, yourselves, themselves, themselves (there is also oneself, from the indefinite pronoun one). These are used mainly to replace the oblique form when referring to the same entity as the subject of the clause; they are also used as intensive pronoun (as in I did it myself).

Personal pronouns are also often associated with possessive forms. English has two sets of such forms: the possessive determiners (also called possessive adjectives) my, your, his, her, its, our and their, and the possessive pronouns mine, yours, his, hers, its (rare), ours, theirs (for more details see English possessive). In informal usage both types of words may be called "possessive pronouns", even though the former kind do not function in place of nouns, but qualify a noun, and thus do not themselves function grammatically as pronouns.

Some languages, such as the Slavic languages, also have reflexive possessives (meaning "my own", "his own", etc.). These can be used to make a distinction from ordinary third-person possessives. For example, in Slovene:

Eva je dala Maji svojo knjigo ("Eva gave Maja her [reflexive] book", i.e. Eva's own book)
Eva je dala Maji njeno knjigo ("Eva gave Maja her [non-reflexive] book", i.e. Maja's book)

The same phenomenon occurs in the North Germanic languages, for example Danish, which can produce the sentences Anna gav Maria sin bog and Anna gav Maria hendes bog, the distinction being analogous to that in the Slovene example above.

== Syntax ==
=== Antecedents ===
Third-person personal pronouns, and sometimes others, often have an explicit antecedent – a noun phrase which refers to the same person or thing as the pronoun (see anaphora). The antecedent usually precedes the pronoun, either in the same sentence or in a previous sentence (although in some cases the pronoun may come before the antecedent). The pronoun may then be said to "replace" or "stand for" the antecedent, and to be used so as to avoid repeating the antecedent. Some examples:

- John hid and we couldn't find him. (John is the antecedent of him)
- After he lost his job, my father set up a small grocer's shop. (my father is the antecedent of he, although it comes after the pronoun)
- We invited Mary and Tom. He came but she didn't. (Mary is the antecedent of she, and Tom of he)
- I loved those bright orange socks. Can you lend them to me? (those bright orange socks is the antecedent of them)
- Jane and I went out cycling yesterday. We did 30 miles. (Jane and I is the antecedent of we)

Sometimes pronouns, even third-person ones, are used without specific antecedent, and the referent has to be deduced from the context. In other cases there may be ambiguity as to what the intended antecedent is:

- Alan was going to discuss it with Bob. He's always dependable. (the meaning of he is ambiguous; the intended antecedent may be either Alan or Bob)

=== Pronoun dropping ===
In some languages, subject or object pronouns can be dropped in certain situations (see Pro-drop language). In particular, in a null-subject language, it is permissible for the subject of a verb to be omitted. Information about the grammatical person (and possibly gender) of the subject may then be provided by the form of the verb. In such languages it is common for personal pronouns to appear in subject position only if they are needed to resolve ambiguity or if they are stressed.

=== Dummy pronouns ===
In some cases pronouns are used purely because they are required by the rules of syntax, even though they do not refer to anything; they are then called dummy pronouns. This can be seen in English with the pronoun it in such sentences as it is raining and it is nice to relax. (This is less likely in pro-drop languages, since such pronouns would probably be omitted.)

== Capitalization ==
Personal pronouns are not normally capitalized, except in particular cases. In English the first-person subject pronoun I is always capitalized, and in some Christian texts the personal pronouns referring to Jesus or God are capitalized (He, Thou, etc.).

In many European languages, but not English, the second-person pronouns are often capitalized for politeness when they refer to the person one is writing to (such as in a letter).

For details, see Capitalization § Pronouns.

== Examples ==
- He shook her* hand.
- Why do you always rely on me to do your* homework for you?
- They tried to run away from the hunter, but he set his* dogs after them.

*Words like her, your and his are sometimes called (possessive) pronouns; other terms are possessive determiner or possessive adjective.

== See also ==
- Deixis
- Gender-neutral pronoun
- Gender-neutral language
- Generic antecedents
- Preferred gender pronoun
- Pronoun game
- Style (manner of address)
- Title
- Honorific
- Thai honorifics: Personal pronouns
