= Victoria River Downs =

Victoria River Downs may refer to

- Victoria River Downs Station, a pastoral lease that operates as a cattle station in the Northern Territory of Australia
- Victoria River Downs Airport, an airport that serves the station

== See also ==
- Victoria River (disambiguation)
