= Victoria River =

Victoria River may refer to:

== Places ==
=== Antarctica ===
- Victoria River, Antarctica, a watercourse in the McMurdo Dry Valley

=== Australia ===
==== Northern Territory ====
- Victoria River, Northern Territory, a locality
- Victoria River (Northern Territory), a river
- Victoria River Downs Station, a cattle station
- Victoria River Downs Airport, an airport

==== Victoria ====
- Victoria River (Victoria), a watercourse

=== Canada ===
- Victoria River (Newfoundland), a watercourse in Newfoundland and Labrador
- Victoria River (lake Mégantic), a watercourse of Chaudière watershed in Quebec

=== New Zealand ===
- Victoria River, New Zealand, a watercourse in New Zealand

== See also ==
- Victoria River Downs (disambiguation)
