= Karranga language =

Extinct Australian Aboriginal language

Karranga
- Karangpurru
- (unattested)
- Region: Northern Territory, Australia
- Ethnicity: Karrangpurru
- Extinct: (date missing)
- Language family: unclassified, likely Pama–Nyungan: Ngumbin?; Mudburra?; Karranga

Language codes
- ISO 639-3: xrq (merged with dmw as Mudburra)
- Glottolog: karr1239
- AIATSIS: C33
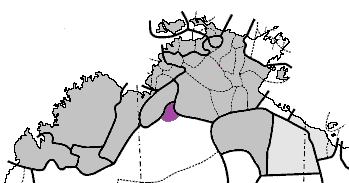
- Karranga (purple), among the non-Pama-Nyungan languages (grey)

Karranga is an extinct, unclassified Aboriginal Australian language spoken by the Karrangpurru people.

McConvell suspects Karrangpurru was a dialect of Mudburra because people said it was similar. However, it is undocumented and thus formally unclassifiable.
