= Bilinarra =

Aboriginal Australian people of the Northern Territory

The Bilinarra, also spelt Bilingara and Bilinara, are an Aboriginal Australian people of the Northern Territory.

== Language ==
The Bilinarra language is classified as an eastern variety of one of the Pama-Nyungan Ngumbin languages. It is mutually intelligible with Gurindji and the dialect spoken by the neighbouring Ngarinman people. Bilinarra is considered a dialect of Ngarinyman, though it shares more vocabulary with Gurindji. There are no structural features that are unique to Bilinarra and linguists would consider all three languages to be dialects of a single language, but speakers of these languages consider them to be different. Elements of their tongue were first recorded by a police constable W. H. Willshire (who was later charged with murder) in 1896. By 2013, only one person was alive who spoke it as their primary language though it inflects the variety of Kriol spoken by Bilinarra children. Bilinarra is native to the Victoria River District of the Northern Territory of Australia. The name of the language most likely refers to the surrounding country, as bili means 'rock' or 'hill', followed by an unknown suffix. Massacres by early colonists, poor treatment on the cattle stations, and mixing of languages at the cattle stations caused Bilinarra to lose prominence as more dominant languages took over, leading to the endangerment of Bilinarra.

== Country ==
Norman Tindale estimated Bilinarra tribal land to cover some 7,500 square miles (19,000 km^{2}) covering the areas of the Moray Range, Delamere, and, in its southern extension, down to the Victoria River Downs and Pigeon Hole stations and the junction where the Victoria and Armstrong rivers join. Its eastern boundaries lay beyond Killarney. Numbers lived around the Billiluna Station in the 1920s. Bilinarra territory was predominantly characterized by blacksoil plains, limestone gorges and sandstone outcrops. Their neighbours are the Mudburra to the east, the Gurindji people to the southwest, and the Ngarinyman to the northwest. Most Bilinarra people now live at Pigeon Hole (Balarrgi)

== Cultural practices and beliefs ==
In order to manufacture a gum for use in fixing tufts of flax to the bodies of dancers in their corroborees, the Bilingara used to call on one of the clan who would not be participating in the dance itself. Once handed a piece of string woven from human hair, the person who was to supply his blood used it as a ligature of his biceps, and then cut into an artery with a stone, jabbing away until an ample flow was secured, which was caught in a bark basin at his feet. What was not used for making gum was given to dingos to lap up.

Their native pharmacopeia drew on things like lemon grass (gubuwubu) and Dodonaea polyzyga (yirrigaji) for preparing a medicinal drink or lotion, mixed with a slurry of termite mound earth (mardumardu) to treat congestion, for example.

With regard to conception, the Bilinarra consider that children pre-exist their actual births, in the form of spirits that linger around an outcrop of rocks at a site called Gurdurdularni ('the place of women's children). Even the spirits of the dead (yirrmarug) may reincarnate themselves by shifting into the foetus of a pregnant woman. Numerous foods were taboo for such women, the bans being related to beliefs that such meats might damage the unborn child. Turtle (gurwarlambara) meat for example was forbidden because it was thought that, were it consumed, the child would grow up walking with a turtle-like waddle.

== History of contact ==
The first non-Aboriginal (gardiya), that is, European, to venture into the Victoria Downs area was John Lort Stokes in 1839. The first major exploratory expedition followed in 1855-1856 when the area was surveyed by Francis Gregory and his brother Henry, and they reported favourably on its prospects for pastoral development. In 1883 Charles Fisher and Maurice Lyons set up the Victoria River Downs Station on an area that extended over Bilingara and Karrangpurru lands.

The Bilinarra suffered from massacres during the period of their dispossession as their land was taken over for pastoral development, and even thereafter, on the stations where they sought employment, were treated harshly. Like other tribes in the area, they suffered from the standard three successive waves of colonial devastation: introduced disease, land-clearing massacres, (Note: Bilingara oral traditions regarding these are said to be corroborated by W.H. Willshire's The land of the dawning. Willshire was a constable at Gordon Creek. Darrell Lewis writes of him that:"Willshire is the most notorious policeman in Northern Territory (and possibly) Australian history. He was based in Central Australia in the 1880s, a time of severe conflict there between the Aborigines and settlers. In 1891 he was charged with the murder of a number of Aborigines, but in spite of strong evidence against him he was found not guilty. He was not sent back to Central Australia, but after several short-term postings in South Australia, he was sent to another region where severe problems with Aborigines existed - the Victoria River District.. Victoria River Aborigi8nal oral history speaks of the first policeman shooting people in the same general areas where fights with Aborigines are documented in Willshire's book..when Willshire was stationed at Gordon Creek there was a sizeable Aboriginal population in Bilinarra country, but for decades after he left the Bilinarra were numerically one of the weakest tribes in the entire Victoria River District." (Lewis 2012, pp. 104.106)) and forced labour on the new pastoral leases. Meakins and Nordlinger state that with the establishment in 1894 of a police station run by Willshire "massacres became the officially sanctioned method of population control." Their numbers rapidly declined.

In Bilinarra oral history accounts, two massacres in particular are recorded for this early period. One group of tribesmen were rounded up and brought into the Gordon Creek police station, where they were tethered and then shot, with their bodies then burnt and dumped into a rubbish tip for cattle bones. In a further incident, a cook prepared a stew for some Bilinarra, lacing it with strychnine. Thereafter the site was named Poison Creek. Survivors eventually made their way into Ngarinman territory, where many were killed as intruders, while women were taken as wives. Those women returned to Bilinarra lands on the demise of their husbands.

Some time around 1922 a Bilinarra youth nicknamed "Banjo" killed the Billiluna station manager Condon and his white stockman, Sullivan, after the latter had abducted his woman for sexual purposes. Banjo remonstrated with the usurper, but to no effect, other than being dressed down. When the time came for the annual calf-branding, Banjo snuck into the station and, seizing a rifle on a table, shot Sullivan in the thigh, and he died of the wound soon after. He then aimed at Condon, who asked him not to shoot, and killed him. The other blacks thought of spearing him, but he had the upper hand with a rifle, and ordered some of them to report the murder to the manager of another station, while he slipped off to the Kimberley with his girl. Jack Flinders eventually tracked him down near Mary River and Louisa Downs, and shot him dead.

Bilinarra people joined Gurindji and other workers in the Wave Hill walk-off in 1967, to protest poor working conditions on the cattle station.

== Alternative names ==
- Bilinara
- Bilinurra
- Billianera
- Bilyanarra
- Bilyanurra
- Boonarra
- Bringara
- Bulinara
- Pillenurra
- Plinara

Source: Tindale 1974, p. 22

== Some words ==
- girrawa. (goanna)
- jamud. (bush turkey)
- jiya (kangaroo)
- yinarrwa. (barramundi)

Source: Meakins & Nordlinger 2014, p. 12

== See also ==
- Ngumpit, a name used by the Gurindji, Malngin, Bilinara, Mudburra and Ngarinyman peoples to refer to themselves as a group

== Sources ==
- Eylmann, Erhart (1908). Die Eingeborenen der Kolonie Südaustralien (PDF) (in German). Berlin: D. Reimer.
- Gaunt, C. E. (5 May 1932). "The Tragedy of Billiluna". The Northern Standard. Darwin – via Trove.
- Lewis, Darrell (2012). A Wild History: Life and Death on the Victoria River Frontier. Monash University Publishing. ISBN 978-1-921-86726-2.
- Meakins, Felicity; Nordlinger, Rachel (2014). A Grammar of Bilinarra: An Australian Aboriginal Language of the Northern Territory. Walter de Gruyter. ISBN 978-1-614-51274-5.
- Rose, Deborah Bird (1991). Hidden Histories: Black Stories from Victoria River Downs, Humbert River and Wave Hill Stations. Aboriginal Studies Press. ISBN 978-0-855-75224-8.
- Terry, Michael (November 1926). "A Surgical Operation as Performed by the Boonarra Tribe of Northern Australia, and a Short Vocabulary of the Languages of Some North Australian Tribes". Man. 26: 193–194. doi:10.2307/2787434. JSTOR 2787434.
- Tindale, Norman Barnett (1974). "Bilingara (NT)". Aboriginal Tribes of Australia: Their Terrain, Environmental Controls, Distribution, Limits, and Proper Names. Australian National University Press. ISBN 978-0-708-10741-6. Archived from the original on 20 March 2020.
- Willshire, W. H. (1896). Land of the dawning. Adelaide: W. J. Thomas & Co.
