= VRD =

VRD may mean:

- Virtual retinal display, technology to display directly onto the retina
- Volunteer Reserve Decoration, medal of RNVR and RNZNVR
- Virgin America, ICAO airline code
- Victoria River Downs Airport, Australia, IATA code
- Vacation rental dwelling
