= Wanyjirra =

Indigenous Australian people

The Wandjira were an indigenous Australian people of the Northern Territory.

== Language ==
Their Wanyjirra language, now moribund, is one of the Ngumbin languages. Tasaku Tsunoda made some early recordings of their speech, and these, together with fieldwork materials she gathered as a postgraduate student of Nick Evans, were the basis of a full descriptive published by Chikako Senge in 2015. Many Wandkora also spoke the closely related Standard Eastern Gurindji and conversations between these groups would often involve code-switching.

== Country ==
Tindale's estimate of Wandjira lands has them occupying roughly 5,300 square miles (14,000 km^{2}), stretching northwards from the Inverway Station to the margins of the plateau situated close to Mount Rose; Their western reaches ran as far as Kulungulan on the border shared with Western Australia. Eastwards they were present as far as approximately Mount Farquharson, while their southern extension ran into hard sandstone country. They were present also at Munbu on the upper Negri River.

== History of contact ==
The surviving remnants of the Wandjira now live mainly around Inverway Station, and also Birrindudu Station on the edge of the Tanami Desert.

== Alternative names ==
- Wadshora (Note: Tindale cites the Berndts' 1946 paper as bearing on the Wandjira. In that review article, the Berndts only appear to name a group called the Wandshora, which they transcribe phonetically as Wandshәra.)
- Manu
- Manoo

== Phonology ==
Wanyjirra consonants
	Bilabial	Alveolar	Retroflex	Palatal	Velar
Plosive	b	d	ɖ <rd>	ɟ <j>	ɡ
Nasal	m	n	ɳ <rn>	ɲ <ny>	ŋ <ng>
Lateral		l	ɭ <rl>	ʎ <ly>	
Rhotic		ɾ <rr>	ɻ <r>		
Glide	w			j <y>	

Wanyjirra vowels
	Front	Central	Back
Close	i		u
Open		a a: <aa>	

== Grammar ==
Manyjirra possesses an ergative-absolutive alignment. There are 12 major case suffixes: ergative, absolutive, dative, locative, allative, purposive, ablative, elative, comitative, originative, proprietive, and privative. Cases can co-occur in the same noun.

[yalu-nggu gujarra-lu] ngu=wula=nyunu nyang-ana girnig
DIST2-ERG two-ERG REAL=3UA.SBJ=RR perceive-PRES stare
Those two men are staring at each other.

== Some words ==
- cudibah (white man)

== Sources ==
- Berndt, Ronald; Berndt, Catherine (September 1946). "The Eternal Ones of the Dream". Oceania. 17 (1): 67–78. doi:10.1002/j.1834-4461.1946.tb00143.x. JSTOR 40328097.
- McConvell, Patrick (1988). "Mix-Im-Up: Aboriginal codeswitching, old and new". In Heller, Monica (ed.). Codeswitching: Anthropological and Sociolinguistic Perspectives. Walter de Gruyter. pp. 97–149. ISBN 978-3-110-84961-5.
- McGregor, William B. (2013). The Languages of the Kimberley, Western Australia. Routledge. ISBN 978-1-134-39602-3.
- Senge, Chikako (2015). A Grammar of Wanyjirra, a language of Northern Australia (PDF). Australian National University.
- Terry, Michael (November 1926). "A Surgical Operation as Performed by the Boonarra Tribe of Northern Australia, and a Short Vocabulary of the Languages of Some North Australian Tribes". Man. 26: 193–194. doi:10.2307/2787434. JSTOR 2787434.
- Tindale, Norman Barnett (1974). "Wandjira (NT)". Aboriginal Tribes of Australia: Their Terrain, Environmental Controls, Distribution, Limits, and Proper Names. Australian National University.
