= Walangeri Ngumpinku =

Walangeri Ngumpinku Northern Territory
- Coordinates: 16°26′49″S 130°53′00″E
- Council seat: Yarralin
- Website: Walangeri Ngumpinku

Walangeri Ngumpinku is the name of a former community government council in the Victoria River Downs District of the Northern Territory of Australia. The council merged into the Victoria Daly Shire on 1 July 2008.

The town centre is an "Out station" called Yarralin and peopled by the Pigeon Hole people, also known by other names.

== Geographical coverage ==
From the council's website (see link below):

"The Council is responsible for providing services to Yarralin, Lingara (40 km from Yarralin), Pigeon Hole (98 km from Yarralin), Yinguwinarri (131 km from Yarralin) and Kulumanbulani (20 km from Pigeon Hole).

"The population of the communities is approximately 550 people. Naringman people are strongly represented at Yarralin, the Munburra people at Yinguwinarri and the Bilandala people at Pigeon Hole. While Pigeon Hole and Lingara contain representatives from several family groups, smaller family groups dominate Yinguwinarri and Kulumanbulani. There is a commonality between the constituent populations and they all share a common regional history to the main community at Yarralin."
