= Carmel O'Shannessy =

Australian linguistics professor

Academic background
- Education: University of Sydney (PhD); Max Planck Institute for Psycholinguistics
- Thesis: Language contact and children's bilingual acquisition: learning a mixed language and Warlpiri in northern Australia. (2006)

Academic work
- Discipline: Linguistics
- Sub-discipline: Language documentation, language contact, Australian languages, language acquisition
- Institutions: The Australian National University
- Website: ANU Faculty Page

Carmel O'Shannessy is an Australian linguistics professor at the Australian National University. She is particularly known for her work on language contact in Australia, having described and documented what is now known as Light Warlpiri. Her research combines her expertise in linguistics with a teaching background. She worked as a teacher in Indigenous schools in Australia's Northern Territory in the 1990s. Since 2017, she has been Senior Lecturer at the Australian National University.

== Biography ==
O'Shannessy received her PhD from the University of Sydney and the Max Planck Institute for Psycholinguistics in 2007. From 2007 to 2017, she taught at the University of Michigan, and since 2017 she has taught and supervised students at the Australian National University.

O'Shannessy has worked closely with Lajamanu speakers of Warlpiri and Light Warlpiri in her research. O'Shannessy first documented the language in 2005. O'Shannessy further observed the Lajamanu code-switching between Light Warlpiri, English, and creole. She is credited with discovering the use of Light Warlpiri through observations of children speakers, recognizing distinctions from how adults spoke. O'Shannessy has described its grammar as having a "unique and radical" structure.

She has received funding for her work on Light Warlpiri and language acquisition in the Northern Territories from the National Science Foundation and through the Australian Research Council Future Fellowship programme. O'Shannessy has spoken positively about language revitalization, pointing to examples of Indigenous people seeking out and learning their languages.
