= Malngin =

Aboriginal Australian people of Western Australia

The Malngin are an Aboriginal Australian people of the Kimberley region of Western Australia. The Malngin language was a dialect of Gurindj.

== Country ==
Norman Tindale estimated their tribal lands to have encompassed some 15,000 square kilometres (5,600 sq mi) and placed their western frontier at Flecker Creek on the upper Ord River. Their north-northeastern extension ran to Lissadell, Rosewood, and the Argyle Downs. Their western boundaries lay around the eastern scarp of the Carr Boyd Range at Carlton Gorge. Their eastern reach ran only so far as the Ord River valley and the lower Negri River. The southern frontier was marked by the junction where the Nicholson River meets the Ord River.

Their neighbours were the Miriwung to their north, and running clockwise, on their eastern wing, in what is now the Northern Territory, were the Mariu. The Djaru lay directly south, and the Gija were along their western flank, with the border between the two running north along the track from Halls Creek to Wyndham.

== Alternative names ==
Alternative names for Malngin are:

- Malgin
- Malngjin

== See also ==
- Ngumpit, a name used by the Gurindji, Malngin, Bilinara, Mudburra and Ngarinyman peoples to refer to themselves as a group

== Sources ==
- "AIATSIS map of Indigenous Australia". AIATSIS. 14 May 2024.
- Capell, A. (March 1940). "The Classification of Languages in North and North-West Australia". Oceania. 10 (3): 241–272. doi:10.1002/j.1834-4461.1940.tb00292.x. JSTOR 40327769.
- Davidson, Daniel Sutherland (January–June 1935). "Archaeological Problems of Northern Australia". Journal of the Royal Anthropological Institute of Great Britain and Ireland. 65: 145–183. doi:10.2307/2843847. JSTOR 2843847.
- Kaberry, Phyllis M. (June 1937). "Subsections in the East and South Kimberley Tribes of North-West Australia". Oceania. 7 (4): 436–458. doi:10.1002/j.1834-4461.1937.tb00397.x. JSTOR 40327647.
- "Tindale Tribal Boundaries" (PDF). Department of Aboriginal Affairs, Western Australia. September 2016. Archived from the original (PDF) on 8 March 2016.
- Tindale, Norman Barnett (1974). "Malngin (WA)". Aboriginal Tribes of Australia: Their Terrain, Environmental Controls, Distribution, Limits, and Proper Names. Canberra: Australian National University Press. ISBN 978-0-708-10741-6. LCCN 75516991. OCLC 3052288. OL 4795942M. Wikidata Q128257949. Archived from the original on 20 March 2020.
