= Perrakee =

Possible indigenous Australian tribe

The Perrakee are assumed to have been an Indigenous Australian tribe, now extinct.

== People ==
The name Perrakee is mentioned only once in the ethnographic literature, by R. H. Mathews, writing in 1900, where he mentions this ethnonym, along with those of several other "large and important tribes" such as the Mariu, in the area straddling the Northern Territory and Western Australia. Norman Tindale, in his comprehensive list of Australian Aboriginal tribes, could not identify the group, nor attribute to them any definite geographical location.

== Sources ==
- Mathews, R.H. (January 1900). "Divisions of some West Australian tribes". American Anthropologist. 2 (1): 185–187. doi:10.1525/aa.1900.2.1.02a00190. JSTOR 658875.
- Tindale, Norman Barnett (1974). "Mariu (NT)". Aboriginal Tribes of Australia: Their Terrain, Environmental Controls, Distribution, Limits, and Proper Names. Australian National University.
