= Mudburra language =

Australian Aboriginal language

Mudbura
- Native to: Northern Territory, Australia
- Region: Victoria River to Barkly Tablelands
- Ethnicity: Mudbura, Kwarandji
- Native speakers: 92 (2016 census)
- Language family: Pama–Nyungan: Ngumpin–Yapa; Ngumpin; Mudbura
- Signed forms: Mudbura Sign Language

Language codes
- ISO 639-3: dmw
- Glottolog: mudb1240
- AIATSIS: C25
- ELP: Mudburra

Mudburra, also spelt Mudbura, Mudbarra and other variants, and also known as Pinkangama, is an Aboriginal language of Australia.

McConvell suspects Karrangpurru was a dialect of Mudburra because people said it was similar. However, it is undocumented and thus formally unclassifiable.

The language Mudburra is native to the western area of Barkly Region, southern area of Sturt Plateau and eastern area of Victoria River District, in Northern Territory Australia. Furthermore, the areas in which the Mudbura people live are Yingawunarri (Top Springs), Marlinja (Newcastle Waters Station), Kulumindini (Elliott) and Stuart Highway.

Information from the 2016 Australian census documented that there were 96 people speaking the Mudburra language, while other reports state that fewer than 10 people speak it fluently. It was also reported that children do not learn the traditional form of the language any more.

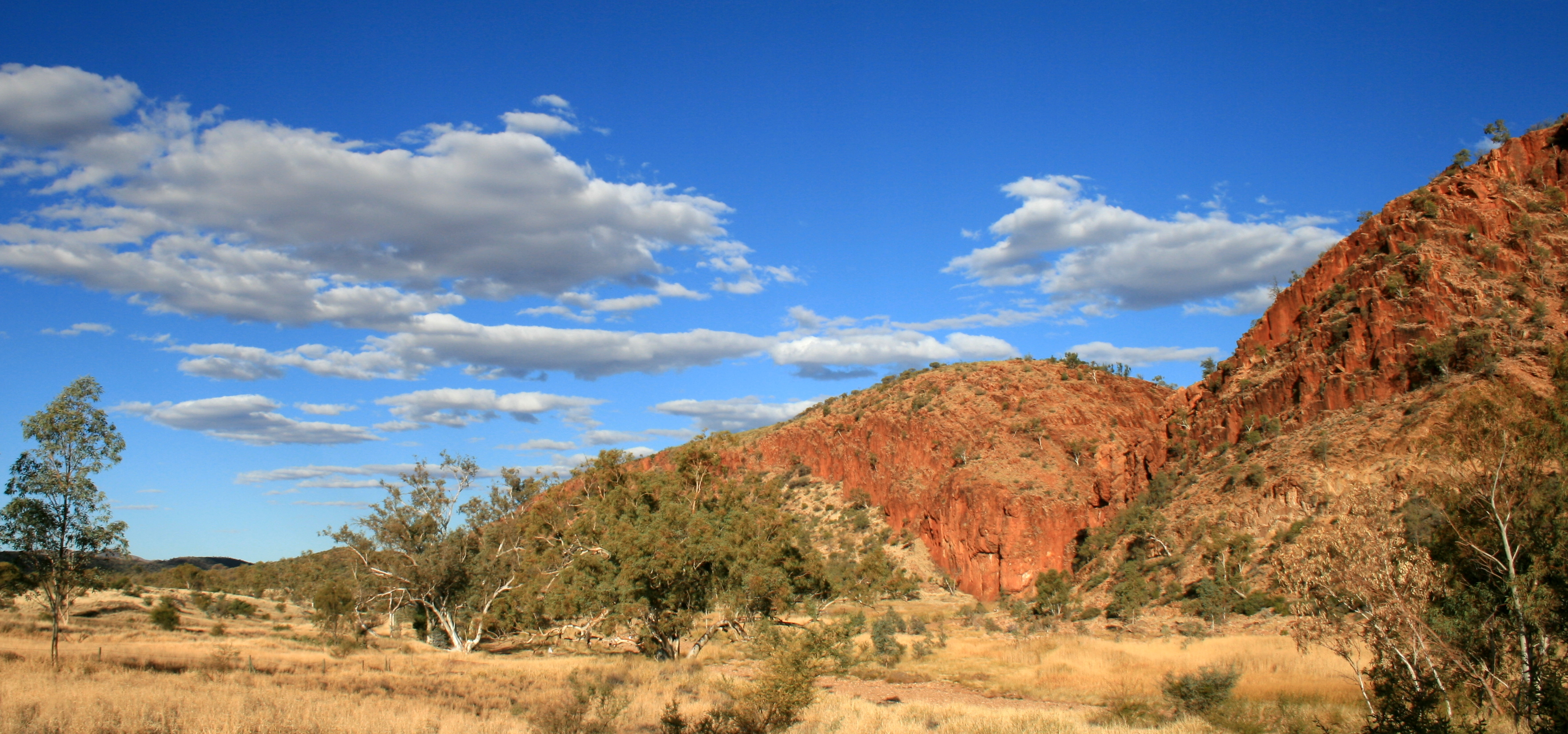
Northern Territory

== Classification ==
The Mudbura language is classified under the family Pama- Nyungan and the subgroup Ngumpin- Yapa. Mudbura is subdivided as Eastern Mudbura dialect (also called Kuwaarrangu) and Western Mudbura dialect (also called Kuwirrinji) by native speakers. This separation occurred due to the communication with speakers of other languages or dialects that happened over time. Proximately associated languages are Gurindji, Bilinarra, and Ngarinyman.

== History ==
During the pre- European era, the Mudbura people practised seasonal migration. They resided around and south of the Murranji Track, as well as the eastern side of Victoria River. The Mudbura country was very arid and so the natives had to cover long distances to accommodate food search and other needs. In the mid-1800s the Europeans arrived in the Barkly area and Victoria River and the first expedition of Victoria River occurred in 1855 by Augustus Charles Gregor's party.

In 1861 John McDouall Stuart and his party explored for the first time the Barkly Tablelands in search for a path from south to north. Stuart named the water source “Newcastle Water” after his Grace the Duke of Newcastle, Secretary for the Colonies. After examining it, it was apparent to him that this tributary was frequently occupied by the Mudbura people and neighbouring communities as a water and food source.

In 1883, Newcastle Waters Station and Wave Hill Station were established and stocked with livestock. As a result, the Mudbura people were being driven off their grounds from both sides. The livestock farming that begun taking place in these areas resulted in significant changes on their environment and resources that had been a part of their lives for more than 10000 years ago. Many Mudbura people moved to the stations in order to work as domestic or station workers to receive in return scarce quantities of food and to avoid violent encounters with Europeans. The Stations, that were managed by Europeans, did not offer equal wages or satisfactory living conditions. At Newcastle Waters Station Mudbura was the major language spoken.

Mudbura people created a type of shelter known as nanji that was composed of kurrunyu (bark) from karnawuna, (lancewood; known also as Acacia shirleyi). A nanji would have a short door opening and inside the height from the ground to the ceiling was enough for an adult to stand upright. Inside it offered enough space for up to 6 people and had liwiji (a silky browntop grass) or liyiji (desert red grass), handcrafted beds made by Mudbura people.

Kriol was the language that resulted from a combination of Aboriginal languages and English that Aboriginal workers created in order to communicate with the Europeans in the 1900s. Kriol started spreading to Mudbura community through the years and has since remained as language in their community.

== Present ==
Nowadays, most Mudbura people reside in Elliott, a small area that is located between Darwin and Alice Springs, or in Marlinja. According to the 2016 census, 339 people live in Elliott. The Mudbura language is currently at risk of obliteration as nowadays speakers of Mudbura communities either speak Aboriginal English or Kriol with the exception of a few elders that can still communicate it.

== Connection to similar dialects ==
Prior to the appearance of Europeans, Mudbura speakers were able to speak multiple Aboriginal languages that neighboured their land. Such languages were Gurindji and Jingulu. Speakers of Eastern Mudbura dialect, that live near Elliott and Marlinja have always been in close proximity to speakers of Jingulu and as a result some features of both communities have assimilated into each other.

Apart from that, a massive borrowing of words occurs between the two languages. Speakers of the Western Mudbura dialect have been close to the Gurindji community and are characterized with a few shared features, that are different to Eastern Mudbura.

Pensalfini reported that: “The resulting mixing of Mudburra and Jingili people produced a cultural group who are referred to (by themselves in many cases, and by older Jingili) as ‘Kuwarrangu’, distinct from either Jingili or Mudburra”.

== Phonology ==
=== Consonants ===
	Peripheral		Laminal	Apical	
	Labial	Velar	Palatal	Alveolar	Retroflex
Plosive	p~b	k~ɡ	c~ɟ	t~d	ʈ~ɖ
Nasal	m	ŋ	ɲ	n	ɳ
Lateral			ʎ	l	ɭ
Rhotic				ɾ	
Approximant	w		j		ɻ

=== Vowels ===
	Front	Back
High	i iː	u uː
Low	a aː	

=== Alphabet ===
The alphabet of Mudbura language is written identically to the English language but it is spoken differently. Mudbura has 3 vowels: ⟨a, i, u⟩.

- ⟨a⟩ is pronounced like the vowel in “father”, in English.
- ⟨i⟩ is pronounced like the vowel in “bit”.
- ⟨u⟩ is pronounced like the vowel in “put”, in English.

Vowel combinations that produce different sounds are: ⟨aw, ay, iyi, uwu, uwa, uwi⟩.

The consonants that are pronounced sometimes differently than in English are: b, d, k, j and the rest sound similarly to the English consonants. Consonant combinations include: ⟨rd, rn, rl, ng, ny, ly, rr⟩. The sound ⟨rd⟩ is unique in the way that it resembles the sound of rolling the r combined with d.

== Grammar ==
=== Verbs ===
In Mudbura language there are verbs and coverbs. Verbs have “inflection” endings depending on the role of a verb in a sentence. The four inflections are: Imperative verbs, past tense verbs, present tense verbs and potential verbs. There are 5 different conjugations that these inflecting verbs fall under, and each comes with different groups of endings.

Example of conjugations
	Imperative	Past	Present	Potential
Group 1A	wanjarra leave it!	wanjana left it	wanjanini leaves it	wanjarru will leave it
Group 1B	warnda get it!	warndana got it	warndanini gets it	warndu will get it
Group 2A	yinba sing it!	yinbarna sang it	yinbarnini sings it	yinba will sing it
Group 2B	janki burn it!	jankiyina burnt it	jankiyini burns it	janki will burn it
Group 3	ngardangka abandon it!	ngardangana abandoned it	ngardanganini abandons it	ngardangangku will abandon it
Group 4	nganja eat it!	ngarnana ate it	ngarnini eats it	ngalu will eat it
Group 5	yanda go!	yanana went	yanini goes	yandu will go

=== Coverbs ===
In Mudbura, coverbs accompany inflecting verbs to indicate that the action is continuous. Some of these have specific inflecting verbs with which they are exclusively combined. Coverbs may be combined with different endings that change their meaning or their role in a sentence.

=== Demonstratives ===
In Mudbura language definite and indefinite articles are not necessary before nouns, only demonstratives such as nginya and yali. The four demonstratives of Mudbura are used in any order in a sentence and they are:

1. nginya (or minya) "this"
2. yali "that one close up"
3. kadi "that one close up"
4. kuwala "like this"

Demonstratives can have different endings that are similar to the Mudbura grammatical case endings. Demonstratives can also take endings that indicate quantity like -rra for "many" and -kujarra for "two".

Conjugations of demonstratives
	nginya	kadi	yali
Nominative	nginya, minya this (one)	kadi that (one) close up	yali that (one) long way away
Ergative	nginyali, minyali this (one) did it	kadili that (one) did it	yalili that (one) did it
Dative	nginyawu, minyawu for this (one)	kadiwu for that (one)	yaliwu for that (one)
Locative	nginyangka, minyangka here	kadingka there	yalingka there
Allative	nginyangkurra, mingyangkurra to here	kadingkurra to there	yalingkurra to there
Ablative	nginyangurlu, minyangurlu from here	kadingurlu from there	yalingurlu from there

=== Pronouns ===
Mudbura pronouns are divided to three groups, the bound pronouns, the free pronouns and the indefinite pronouns. Bound pronouns can be found free in a sentence or accompanying a noun or a free pronoun and usually they are combined at the end of the word “ba”. They vary depending on the quantity of people and whether these are the subject or the object of the sentence, however there are no third person bound pronouns. There are singular, dual and plural forms of bound pronouns. Free pronouns are used to highlight a person and they also have possessive types that indicate ownership.

Pronouns
	Free pronouns	Possessive pronouns
1st person	ngayu, ngayi I, me	ngayinya my, mine
2nd person	nyundu you	nyununya your, yours
3rd person	nyana he or him, she or her	nyanunya his, her, hers

When referring to many people the quantity endings that are stated in the Demonstratives section are added. Indefinite pronouns are used to refer to unidentified objects or people. They are:

nyamba, something
ngana, someone
nganali, someone did it
nyangurla, sometime
ngadjanga, some amount
wanjuwarra, somewhere

=== Quantity endings ===
Quantity and numbers are indicated with endings that are added to words. Such are -kujarra for "two", -darra or -walija for "many".

=== Sentences ===
The structure of sentences in Mudbura language does not follow specific rules, the subject can go in any order throughout a sentence and noun phrases may come apart if needed under the condition that all words of the phrase follow the same grammatical case.

Sentences can be intransitive meaning they do not include an object, transitive in which they include an object and a subject, semi-transitive in which they include a subject and an indirect object, and ditransitive in which they include a subject, an object and an indirect object.

Showing possession in a sentence can be expressed with bound or free pronouns in the case the speaker is referring to a part of their body, or with possessive pronouns in the case the speaker is referring to something they own.

Negative sentences are formed with the word kula combined with the verb in the associated tense. This indicates that something "is not", "was not" or "will not" and in terms of structure kula is found at the beginning of the sentence or right after the first word. Other words and endings such as -mulu (don't), wakurni (no or nothing) and -wangka (without) can be used to express negativity.

Linking words or additional endings may be used in more complex sentences when these include more than 1 clause. Examples are:

- -baa and -maa that mean "when, if, which, who"
- abala that means "when, that, while, which, then"
- amba that means "so that, that, which, while"

The word "and" does not exist in the Mudbura language as words are either expressed consecutively without any linking words or some of the linking words stated above may be used.

== Vocabulary ==
=== Common question words ===
- nyamba, what?
- nyambawu, why?
- ngana, who?
- nganawu, whose?
- wanji, which?
- wanjuwarra, where?
- ngadjanga, how much? or how many?
- nyangurla, when?
- ngadarra, how?

=== Indicating direction ===
- kankulu, up, above, on top of
- kanju, down, under, on the bottom, underneath, in
- kirrawarra, north
- kurlarra, south
- karlarra, west
- karrawarra, east

=== Numbers ===
- nyangarlu, one
- kujarra, two
- murrkuna, three
- dardudardu, more, many, a whole lot

Note: Numbers 1, 2 and 3 are the only ones that have words in the Mudbura language.

== Sign language ==
The Mudbura has (or had) a well-developed signed form of their language. “Marnamarnda” is the name of the Mudbura sign language, which can be incorporated with speech or used by itself. Mudburra people use it when hunting or to accommodate long-distance communication.
