= Mudburra =

Aboriginal Australian people of the Northern Territory

The Mudburra, also spelt Mudbara and other variants, are an Aboriginal Australian people of the Northern Territory.

== Language ==
Mudburra is one of the far eastern forms of the Pama-Nyungan Ngumbin languages.

== Country ==
The Mudburra people live in the thick scrub area near and west of the Murranji Track (the Ghost Road of the Drovers) and held in Tindale's estimation some 10,000 square miles (26,000 km^{2}) of land, centered on the junction of the Armstrong River and the upper Victoria River at a place called Tjambutjambulani. Their northern reach ran as far as Top Springs, their frontier to the south lay at Cattle Creek. In an east–west axis, their land extended from near Newcastle Waters to the Camfield River.

== Alternative names ==
- Madbara
- Moodburra, Mootburra
- Mudbara
- Mudbera
- Mudbra
- Mudbura
- Mudburra
- Mulpira (Iliaura exonym)

Source: Tindale 1974, p. 232

== See also ==
- Ngumpit, a name used by the Gurindji, Malngin, Bilinara, Mudburra and Ngarinyman peoples to refer to themselves as a group
- Wave Hill walk-off, in which Mudbara workers joined the Gurindji strike in 1967

== Sources ==
- Mathews, R. H. (July–September 1900). "The Wombya Organization of the Australian Aborigines". American Anthropologist. 2 (3): 494–501. doi:10.1525/aa.1900.2.3.02a00050. JSTOR 658964.
- Mathews, R. H. (1901). "Ethnological notes on the aboriginal tribes of the Northern Territory". Queensland Geographical Journal. 16: 69–90.
- Meakins, Felicity; Nordlinger, Rachel (2014). A Grammar of Bilinarra: An Australian Aboriginal Language of the Northern Territory. Walter de Gruyter. ISBN 978-1-614-51274-5.
- Radcliffe-Brown, A. R. (October–December 1930). "The Social Organization of Australian Tribes Part II (Continued)". Oceania. 1 (3): 322–341. doi:10.1002/j.1834-4461.1930.tb01652.x. JSTOR 40327330.
- Tindale, Norman Barnett (1974). "Mutpura (NT)". Aboriginal Tribes of Australia: Their Terrain, Environmental Controls, Distribution, Limits, and Proper Names. Australian National University. ISBN 978-0-708-10741-6.
- Yallop, C. L. (1969). "The Aljawara and Their Territory". Oceania. 39 (3): 187–197. doi:10.1002/j.1834-4461.1969.tb01005.x. JSTOR 40329775.
