= Bilinarra language =

Australian Aboriginal language

Bilinarra
- Native to: Australia
- Ethnicity: Bilinarra
- Native speakers: 1 (2013)
- Language family: Pama–Nyungan: Ngumpin–Yapa; Ngumpin; Bilinarra

Language codes
- ISO 639-3: –
- Glottolog: bili1250 Bilinarra
- ELP: Bilinarra
- Coordinates: 14°56′50″S 129°33′15″E

Bilingara, also known as the Bilinarra, is an Australian Aboriginal language spoken by the Bilinarra people of the Northern Territory.

It is classified as an eastern variety of one of the Pama-Nyungan Ngumpin languages. It is mutually intelligible with Gurindji and the neighbouring Ngarinyman. Bilinarra is considered a dialect of Ngarinyman, though it shares more vocabulary with Gurindji. There are no structural features that are unique to Bilinarra and linguists would consider all three languages to be dialects of a single language, but speakers of these languages consider them to be different. Elements of their tongue were first recorded by a police constable W. H. Willshire in 1896. By 2013, only one person was alive who spoke it as their primary language though it inflects the variety of Kriol spoken by Bilinarra children. Bilinarra is native to the Victoria River District of the Northern Territory of Australia. The name of the language most likely refers to the surrounding country, as bili means 'rock' or 'hill', followed by an unknown suffix.Massacres by early colonists, poor treatment on the cattle stations, and the blending of languages at these stations contributed to Bilinarra losing prominence, as more dominant languages took over. This led to the endangerment of Bilinarra. According to Ethnologue, Bilinarra is rated an 8a (moribund) level of endangerment.

== Phonology ==
=== Vowels ===
Bilinarra contains 6 vowels, three distinct vowels with both the regular and long versions present. The vowel phonemes are provided below.

Vowel phonemes
	Front	Central	Back
High	i (i) iː (ii)		ʊ (u) ʊː (uu)
Low		ɐ (a) ɐː (aa)	

The long version of each vowel is present in the language but occurs rarely.

=== Consonants ===
Bilinarra consists of 23 consonants for a total of 31 phonemes:

Consonant phonemes
	Bilabial	Alveolar	Retroflex	Lamino-palatal	Velar
Stop	p, b (b)	t, d (d)	ʈ, ɖ (rd)	c, ɟ (j)	k, ɡ (g)
Nasal	m	n	ɳ (rn)	ɲ (ny)	ŋ (ng)
Lateral		l	ɭ (rl)	ʎ (ly)	
Tap/Trill		ɾ, r (rr)			
Glide	w		ɻ (r)	j (y)	

=== Syllable structure ===
Template	Example	Translation
CV	/ba.ga/	prickle
CVC	/jurr.gan/	forearm
CVCC	/durrb/	pierce, stab

The above examples demonstrate the types of syllabic structure in Bilinarra. For CVC syllable structure, all consonants except for can be the last consonant in this structure. CVCC structure is found much less often than CVC. CVCC structure appears in mostly coverbs, though some nominals also take this form. This structure is also found in monosyllabic words or as the last syllable in a disyllabic word. CVCC always contains the pattern /r/, /l/, or /ɭ/ (liquid consonants) followed by /g/, /b/, or /ŋ/.

=== Stress ===
Stress in Bilinarra is very predictable. Primary stress always falls on the first syllable of the word. Words of two and three syllables only contain one stress. Examples as follows:

Number of syllables	Word	Translation
Two	'wardan	big
Three	'janggarni	forearm, hand

For words greater than three syllables, the primary stress occurs on the first syllable and secondary stress on the third:

Number of syllables	Word	Translation
Four	'jawulˌwarra	king brown snake

In longer words, which include affixation and clitics or more than one syllable, a new stress domain follows. As an example consider the word, 'mangarri-'murlung-'gulu=rni='rnalu. The stress falls on the first syllable of each multisyllabic morpheme, and the clitic "=rni" receives no stress.

== Morphology ==
=== Affixation ===
In Billinarra, morphology consists exclusively of suffixation. The complete structure of the nominal word can be defined as follows:

ROOT + (DERIV) + (NUM) + (ADNOM) + (CASE) + CASE # [ = (DISCOURSE CLITIC) = (PRONOMINAL CLITIC) = (DUBITATIVE CLITIC)]

==== Derivational suffixation ====
There exists derivational suffixation such as the nominalizer, -waji, which transforms a verb, in this case, into a noun:

Jindagu girri-nggu yuwa-ni junggard-ngarna rurr-waji-la
one woman-ERG put-PST smoke-ASSOC sit-NMLZ-LOC
'One woman put the packet of cigarettes on the chair.'

Zero-derivation also takes place in Bilinarra, where nouns can be derived from coverbs. For example, ngurra can mean "to camp" or "camp" depending on the context.

==== Adnominal suffixation ====
Adnominal suffixation is suffixation attached to nouns. As an example, consider the use of -gujarra, which means dual:

Nyila=ma=rna jayi-nya jagarr-ngarna-gujarra
that=TOP=1MIN.S give-PST cover-ASSOC-DU
'I gave him two blankets.'

Nanagu-gari-lu
SUBSECT-OTHER-ERG
"The other Nanagu", describes not oneself but another.

Jagarr-ngarna-gujara
cover-ASSOC-DU
"Two blankets", describes precisely two things (number suffix)

Derivational and inflectional suffixation can be combined in Bilinarra. For example:

Rurr-waji-la
sit-NMLZ-LOC
"On the chair"
combines both the nominalizer -waji and -la indicating location

=== Clitics ===
Clitics in Bilinarra generally have a semantic or discourse function in creation of a word. They are usually placed after inflectional and derivational morphology but before pronominal clitics with the exception of the DUBitative clitic. The types of clitics included in Bilinarra are discourse clitic, pronominal clitic, and dubative clitic. The dubative clitic, =nga, in Bilinarra marks uncertainty or doubt:

Nyawa=ma=rna=nga lurrbu=rni=warla ya-n.gu lurrbu, ngurra-gari-la.
his=TOP=1MIN.S=DUB return=ONLY=FOC go-POT return camp-OTHER-LOC
'I might just go back, then return the next day.'

Bilinarra has both "restricted" and "unrestricted" clitics. Of interest to note is the difference between restricted and unrestricted clitics. Unrestricted clitics can be attached to any part of speech. For example, =ma, TOPic, and =barla/warla, FOCus:

Wanyji-ga=warla=n ba-ni nyila girrawa?
which-LOC=FOC=2MIN.S hit-PST that goanna
'Where did you kill that goanna?'

On the other hand, restricted clitics can only attach to certain parts of speech. The expectation modifier =rni, ONLY, can be attached to all words except inflecting verbs, and =rnigan, AGAIN, can only attach to nominals and coverbs:

diwu-waji=rningan
fly-NMLZ=AGAIN
"plane again"

Yala-ngurlu=ma=rna diwu-waji=rningan lab ma-n.gu.
that-ABL=TOP=1MIN.S fly-NMLZ=AGAIN pick.up do-POT
'Then I'll take plane again.'

=== Reduplication ===
In Bilinarra, reduplication is used to encode plurality with nouns, intensity with adjectives, and participant plurality for coverbs. The most common form of reduplication in Bilinarra involves copying the first two syllables of the stem as a prefix, or just the first syllable in the case of monosyllabic stems, resulting in a full symmetric reduplication:

wajja > wajja-wajja > 'hurry-REDUP'

For multi-syllabic words, this form of reduplication results in partial reduplication:

jalyarra > jalya-jalyarra > 'dip into water'

Another type of reduplication applies only to coverbs and involves copying the final CVC syllable as a suffix to achieve reduplication:

gudij > gudi-dij > 'standing around'

=== Case and agreement ===
Case is very important in Bilinarra as it is used to encode grammatical relations and to mark different types of subordination and switch-reference.

==== Nominative and accusative ====
The nominative case (intransitive subjects) and accusative case (transitive object) are always unmarked. For example, crocodile (warrija) takes the same form in the transitive and intransitive case:

Warrija-gujarra=ma wardard-ba=wula garrinya
crocodile(NOM)-DU= TOP.bask-EP=3UA.S be.PRS
'The two crocodiles were basking.'

Ba-ni=wuliny nyila=gada warrija
hit-PST=3UA.O that=IMM crocodile(ACC)
'He killed those two crocodiles there.'

==== Ergative ====
The ergative case suffix marks the subject of a transitive sentence. Additionally, the suffix can be used to mark instruments. A variety of ergative suffixes exist for attachment to different words. The ergative case markers include -lu, -nggu, -gu, -gulu, -du, and -u. For example the ergative case suffix can be used as below:

Gula=wuliny=nga baya-rni warrija-lu
NEG=3UA.O=DUB bite-PST crocodile-ERG
'The crocodile might not have eaten the two of them'

Gamba-la=yi nalija Nina-nggu
cook-PRS=1MIN.O tea NAME-ERG
'Is Nina making tea for me?'

== Syntax ==
=== Simple sentences ===
Like most Australian languages, Bilinarra does not rely on a basic word order, as they are known for their non-configurationally and generally 'free' word order properties. Word order is generally determined by discourse principles rather than grammatical constraints, such that it is not possible to associate grammatical relations with fixed positions in the syntactic structure. Therefore, the pattern of words in a simple transitive sentence does not hold a simple structure. Below the first simple transitive sentence uses VOS word order and the second uses SVO structure and in both examples subsect refers to a group of kinship (Nanagu is a female subsection):

Mirlij-garra ba-ni durlwan Nanagu-lu
skin-CONT hit-PST bark SUBSECT-ERG
'Nanagu chopped the bark off the tree.'

Nanagu-lu wamib na ba-rra nyila gardbi
SUBSECT-ERG spin FOC hit-PRS that hair
'Nanagu spins the hair.'

== Some words ==
- jiya (kangaroo)
- jamud (bush turkey)
- girrawa (goanna)
- yinarrwa (barramundi)

== Bibliography ==
- Meakins, Felicity; Nordlinger, Rachel (2014). A Grammar of Bilinarra: An Australian Aboriginal Language of the Northern Territory. Walter de Gruyter. ISBN 978-1-614-51274-5.
- "Ngarinyman". Ethnologue.
- Willshire, W. H. (1896). Land of the dawning. Adelaide: W. J. Thomas & Co.
