= Light Warlpiri =

Mixed Kriol–Warlpiri language of Australia

- Region: Northern Territory, Australia
- Native speakers: 350 (2013)
- Language family: mixed Kriol–Warlpiri

Language codes
- ISO 639-3: None (mis)
- Glottolog: ligh1234
- Light Warlpiri (Northern Territory) Lajamanu, where Light Warlpiri is spoken

Light Warlpiri is a mixed language of Australia, with Warlpiri, Kriol, and Standard Australian English as its parent languages. It is spoken in the Aboriginal community of Lajamanu in the Northern Territory.

As of 2013, there were 350 native speakers of Light Warlpiri, although all of the speakers also knew traditional Warlpiri, as well as many speaking Kriol and English.

== History ==
Light Warlpiri appears to have originated in the 1980s as a codification and expansion of the Warlpiri/Kriol/English code-switching patterns used in speech directed to young children. The children processed the input they heard as a single system, and added innovations in the verb complex. Within the community, it is perceived as a variety of Warlpiri.

It was first documented by linguist Carmel O'Shannessy of the University of Michigan.

== Characteristics ==
Like other mixed languages, such as Gurindji Kriol, Michif and Medny Aleut, Light Warlpiri takes its nominal and verbal systems from different source languages. Most nouns are from Warlpiri or English and take Warlpiri case-marking, but most verbs and the verbal inflection/auxiliary structure are both borrowed and significantly reanalyzed from Kriol and Australian Aboriginal English.

This language is written in Latin script.

== See also ==
- Gurindji Kriol

== Citations ==
- Bakalar, Nicholas (14 July 2013). "Linguist Finds a Language in Its Infancy". The New York Times.
- O'Shannessy, Carmel (2005). "Light Warlpiri: a new language". Australian Journal of Linguistics. 25 (1): 31–57. doi:10.1080/07268600500110472. hdl:11858/00-001M-0000-0013-1E65-7.
- O'Shannessy, Carmel (2012). "The role of code-switched input to children in the origin of a new mixed language". Linguistics. 50 (2): 305–340. doi:10.1515/ling-2012-0011. ISSN 1613-396X.
- O'Shannessy, Carmel (2013). "The role of multiple sources in the formation of an innovative auxiliary category in Light Warlpiri, a new Australian mixed language". Language. 89 (2): 328–354. doi:10.1353/lan.2013.0025. ISSN 1535-0665.
