= Ngumbin languages =

Pama–Nyungan language family of Australia

Ngumbiny (Ŋumbiń)
- Ngumpin, Ngumbin
- Geographic distribution: Western Australia and Northern Territory
- Linguistic classification: Pama–Nyungan: Ngumpin–Yapa; Ngumbiny (Ŋumbiń)
- Subdivisions: Walmajarri; Djaru; Gurrindji; Mudburra

Language codes
- Glottolog: ngum1252
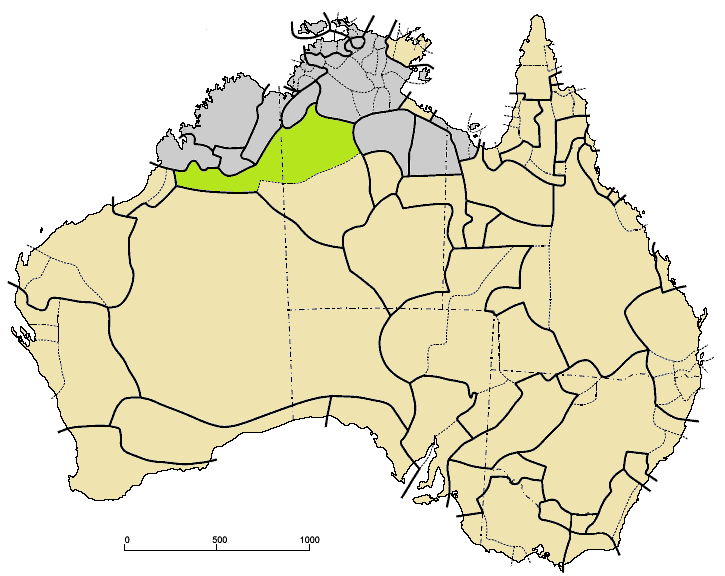
- Ngumpin languages (green) among other Pama–Nyungan (tan).

Ngumpin languages are a small language family of Australia, consisting of (from west to east):

- Walmajarri
- Djaru
- Gurindji (Gurindji proper, Bilinarra, Wanyjirra, Malngin, Ngarinyman)
- Mudburra

In 2004 it was demonstrated that Ngumpin is related to the neighbouring Ngarrkic languages.

== See also ==
- Ngumpit, a name used by the Gurindji, Malngin, Bilinara, Mudburra and Ngarinyman peoples to refer to themselves as a group
