= Gurindji people =

Aboriginal Australian people in Northern Territory

The Gurindji ([ˈɡʊrɪndʒiː]) are an Aboriginal Australian people of northern Australia, 460 kilometres (290 mi) southwest of Katherine in the Northern Territory's Victoria River region.

== Country ==
The Gurindji people live on an estimated 8,400 square miles (22,000 km^{2}) of land. The land is situated on the headwaters of the Victoria River south from Mundane and Tjalwa or Longreach Waterhole, extending westward to G.B. Rockhole and east to Bullock Creek and Canfield River, at Wave Hill. Their southern boundary lies near Hooker Creek.

== Language and culture ==
Gurindji is one of the eastern Ngumpin languages, in the Ngumpin-Yapa subgroup of Pama-Nyungan languages. It is however characterised by a high level of adoption of loanwords from non Pama-Nyungan sources.

Gurindji Kriol is a mixed language, mostly spoken at Kalkaringi and Daguragu along with Gurindji and English.

Gurindji people share many similarities in language and culture with the neighbouring Warlpiri people. They also regard themselves as "one mob" with the Malngin, Bilinara, Mudburra and Ngarinyman peoples, referring to themselves as a group named Ngumpit, sharing "most of our languages and culture".

Among the Ngumpit, there are four skin names for boys, such as Janama and Japarta, and four for girls, such as Nangala and Nawurla. These are inherited at birth and kept for life, determining how all of the people relate to each other.

Jurntakal (snake) is a major Dreaming for the Gurindji, with this and other ancestor spirits keeping their traditional lands alive.

Art is the main occupation, with the Karungkarni Art and Cultural Centre the hub of artistic activity.

== Ethnography ==
Important contributions to the study of the Gurindji were made by the young Japanese scholar Hokari Minoru (保苅実, 1971–2004) before his premature death. Hokari immersed himself in their narratives of the Gurindji experience of the white occupation of their land and, responsive to their complaints that whatever they had transmitted to outsiders ended up locked far away in Australian cities, always had them vet his writings. His primary informant was Jimmy Mangayarri.

== Native title ==
The Gurindji people of the Northern Territory are best known for The Gurindji Strike, or Wave Hill walk-off, led by Vincent Lingiari in 1966, protesting against mistreatment by the station managers. The strike would become the first major victory of the Indigenous land rights movement. A small part of their traditional lands (roughly 3,236 square kilometres (1,249 sq mi)), subsequently known as "Daguragu Station" was handed back to them in 1975 as a Northern Territory pastoral lease, by the then Australian prime minister, Gough Whitlam– paving the way for further land rights victories in Australia.

In 1984, after a hearing under the Aboriginal Land Rights Act 1976, and 1981 recommendations made by the original Aboriginal Commissioner, Justice John Toohey, they were granted inalienable freehold title to almost all of the area originally transferred back to them by Whitlam, 3,250 square kilometres (1,250 sq mi) of their tribal land. A final small portion of the Daguragu lease was recommended by the later Commissioner, Justice Maurice, in 1984. It wasn't until May 1986 that the Hawke government finally handed over the inalienable Aboriginal freehold title deeds to the Gurindji. Much of Wave Hill pastoral station (some 13,500 square kilometres (5,200 sq mi)), however, remains in non-Indigenous hands.

== Governance and economy ==
Two Gurindji communities are Kalkarindji (established by the NT Government as Wave Hill Welfare Settlement), a township of 260 hectares (640 acres) located on the Buntine Highway, and Daguragu, a community settled on land under the Aboriginal Land Rights Act 1976.

Kalkarindji was gazetted as an open town in September 1976 (hence permits are not required for residents or visitors).

Daguragu is located 8 kilometres (5.0 mi) north of Kalkarindji via a bitumen road. Permission from traditional owners, through the Central Land Council, is required to visit Daguragu. Daguragu became the first cattle station to be owned and managed by an Aboriginal community, the Murramulla Gurindji Company, after the Wave Hill walk-off. By the time the Gurindji eventually won ownership of Daguragu in 1986, there was little left of the economy. The bakery was destroyed by flooding in 2001. The Northern Territory Emergency Response ("The Intervention") put controls on people and made compulsory land acquisitions in 2007. Equipment and jobs went during a reorganisation of shires by the NT Labour government in 2008.

Municipal and other services to both communities were provided by the Daguragu Community Government Council until 2008, when it was replaced by the Victoria Daly Shire, now called the Victoria Daly Region, which has a regional office for the ward of Kalkarindji/Daguragu located in Kalkarindji. The council services a number of outstations where traditional owners, belonging to the Gurindji language group, live. Some residents of Daguragu and Kalkarindji belong to other language groups, including the Warlpiri.

Following a successful native title claim over the township, traditional owners of Kalkaringi formed the Gurindji Aboriginal Corporation (GAC) in 2014, a Registered Native Title Body Corporate (RNTBC) owned by a total of about 700 people of mainly Gurindji, Mudburra and Warlpiri heritage. The underlying tenure remains with the government, but the GAC has powers to negotiate. It oversees a number of community-owned enterprises, such as the Kalkaringi Store and Caravan Park.

A 2016 news article about Daguragu described it as "starved, beat up and dying", after "half a century of government duplicity and over promising; bad local management and corporate naivety; land tenure bureaucracy and coercion". It has a creche and a successful Indigenous ranger program, but the hub of activity is at Kalkarindji. Here there is a school, a social club and other services. The traditional owner groups of the two communities do not have a smooth relationship.

== Demographics ==
At the 2016 Australian census, the combined population of Daguragu/Kalkarindji was 575 people, of whom 517 (90.4%) identified as "Aboriginal and/or Torres Strait Islander people".

== Surrounding locality ==
The locality of Gurindji, Northern Territory, an area of 32,372 square kilometres (12,499 sq mi), surrounds Kalkarindji/Daguragu.

== Freedom Day ==
On 23 August every year, a large celebration is held at Kalkarindji to mark the anniversary of the strike and walk-off. Known as Freedom Day, people gather from many parts of Australia to celebrate and re-enact the walk-off.

== Alternative names ==
Norman Tindale lists the following names:

- Garundji
- Guirindji, Gurindji
- Koorangie
- Korindji

== Notable people ==
- Joseph (Joe) Croft
- Vincent Lingiari
- Charlie King

== See also ==
- Gurindji strike

== Sources ==
- "2016 Census QuickStats: Daguragu - Kalkarindji (L)". quickstats. Australian Bureau of Statistics.
- "Freedom Day Festival, Yapakayi-nginyi Jangkarnik - From Little Things Big Things Grow". Freedom Day Festival. Gurindji Aboriginal Corporation. 2020.
- Hardy, Frank J. (1978) [First published 1968]. The Unlucky Australians. Pan Books.
- Harvey, Mark (2020). "Language and Population Shifts in Pre-Colonial Australia: Non-Pama-Nyungan Languages". In Güldemann, Tom; McConvell, Patrick; Rhodes, Richard A. (eds.). The Language of Hunter-Gatherers. Cambridge University Press. pp. 392–421. ISBN 978-1-107-00368-2.
- Hokari, Minoru (2000). "From Wattie Creek to Wattie Creek: an oral historical approach to the Gurindji walk-off". Aboriginal History. 24: 98–116. JSTOR 24046361.
- Hokari, Minoru (2004). Radeikaru ōraru hisutorī. Ōsutoraria senjūmin Aborigini no rekishi jissen ラディカル・オーラル・ヒストリー オーストラリア先住民アボリジニの歴史実践 (in Japanese). Ochanomizu Shobō. ISBN 978-4-275-00334-8.
- Hokari, Minoru (2011). Gurindji Journey: A Japanese Historian in the Outback. University of New South Wales Press. ISBN 978-1-742-24031-2.
- Lewis, Darrell (2012). A Wild History: Life and Death on the Victoria River Frontier. Monash University Publishing. ISBN 978-1-921-86726-2.
- Maurice, Michael (1985). Aboriginal Land Rights (Northern Territory) Act 1976 Report no. 20, Gurindji Land Claim to Daguragu Station; Further report by the Aboriginal Land Commissioner, Mr Justice Maurice, to the Minister for Aboriginal Affairs and to the Administrator of the Northern Territory. Australian Government Publishing Service. ISBN 978-0-644-04158-4. OCLC 29017717.
- McConvell, Patrick (2009). "Loanwords in Gurundji, a Pama-Nyungan language of Australia". In Haspelmash, Martin; Tadmor, Uri (eds.). Loanwords in the world's languages: A comparative handbook. Mouton/de Gruyter. pp. 790–822. ISBN 978-3-11-021843-5.
- McConvell, Patrick; Hagen, Rod (1981). A traditional land claim by the Gurindji to Daguragu Station. Alice Springs, N.T.: Central Land Council.
- "Our Communities: Kalkarindji / Daguragu". Victoria Daly Regional Council.
- "Place Names Register Extract for "Kalkarindji" (Administrative Area)". NT Place Names Register. Northern Territory Government. 3 April 2007.
- Rose, Deborah Bird (1991). Hidden Histories: Black Stories from Victoria River Downs, Humbert River and Wave Hill Stations. Aboriginal Studies Press. ISBN 978-0-855-75224-8.
- Tindale, Norman Barnett (1974). "Korindji". Aboriginal Tribes of Australia: Their Terrain, Environmental Controls, Distribution, Limits, and Proper Names. Australian National University. ISBN 978-0-708-10741-6.
- Toohey, John (1982). Gurindji land claim to Daguragu Station: report by the Aboriginal Land Commissioner, Mr Justice Toohey, to the Minister for Aboriginal Affairs and to the Administrator of the Northern Territory. Australian Government Publishing Service. ISBN 978-0-642-88295-0. OCLC 27501845.
- Turpin, Myfany; Meakins, Felicity; et al. (2019). Songs from the stations: Wajarra as sung by Ronnie Wavehill Wirrpnga, Topsy Dodd Ngarnjal and Dandy Danbayarri at Kalkaringi. Sydney University Press. ISBN 978-1743325858. OCLC 1089228854.
