= Camfield Station =

Cattle station in the Northern Territory of Australia

Coordinates: 17.036°S 131.294°E

Location in Northern Territory

Camfield Station is a pastoral lease that operates as a cattle station in the Northern Territory of Australia.

It is situated about 177 kilometres (110 mi) south east of Timber Creek and 237 kilometres (147 mi) west of Daly Waters. The Buntine Highway cuts through the property for a distance of 68 kilometres (42 mi). Camfield currently occupies an area of 2,790 square kilometres (1,077 sq mi) and is owned by the Australian Agricultural Company. The property is able to carry a herd of 32,000 head of cattle and is currently running Brahman cattle.

Camfield is broken into 22 paddocks, seven holding paddocks and three sets of steel yards. About half of the property lies within 4 kilometres (2 mi) of permanent water with another 37 watering points available for stock.

The property was once part of Victoria River Downs Station but was resumed as part of a returned servicemen scheme in 1952 and taken up by the Vandeleur family who won the leasehold in a ballot.

In 1968 nine Indigenous stockmen and their families walked off the property to join the land claim protest at Wattle Creek at neighbouring Wave Hill Station. The Gurindji walk off was caused by the government not granting about 8 square miles (21 km^{2}) to build a settlement on the Gurindji tribal lands.

In 1977 the Malaysian state of Sabah bought Camfield for A$1.8 million to ensure regular supplies of reasonable priced beef for their domestic market.

Camfield sold for A$1 million in 1979.

== See also ==
- List of ranches and stations
