= Delamere Station (pastoral lease) =

Pastoral lease in the Northern Territory

Coordinates: 15.628°S 131.636°E

Location in Northern Territory

Delamere Station is a pastoral lease that operates as a cattle station in the Northern Territory of Australia.

It is situated about 124 kilometres (77 mi) east of Timber Creek and 145 kilometres (90 mi) south west of Katherine in the Victoria River District. It is composed of undulating to hilly terrain with basaltic black soil supporting Flinders and Mitchell grass. The creek and river systems grow blue grass, sabi grass and stylos.

The station is currently owned by the Australian Agricultural Company, which acquired it in 2004. It occupies an area of 3,003 square kilometres (1,159 sq mi) and has a carrying capacity of approximately 22,000 head of cattle and is managed by Scott and Bec Doherty.

The property is broken up into 28 paddocks and 14 holding paddocks with five sets of steel yards. About one third of the property lies within 4 kilometres (2 mi) of permanent water in the form of 26 bores and three dams. Approximately 490 kilometres (304 mi) of road exist within the property including 40 kilometres (25 mi) of the bitumen Buntine Highway.

Delamere is the Northern Territory's second oldest pastoral lease. Initially known as Glencoe Station, the lease was assigned in 1878 to Messrs Travers and Gibson who remained on the land until 1881 when they sold to Charles Fisher and Maurice Lyons. Fisher and Lyons paid cash for the 5,900 square kilometres (2,280 sq mi) property stocked with 2,000 head of cattle. Fisher and Lyons later took up the lease for Victoria River Downs. The first cattle were overlanded from Aramac in Queensland by Nathaniel Buchanan. In 1884 the property was stocked with approximately 7000 head of mixed cattle and 400 horses.

In 2002 Delamere was owned by a syndicate composed of four businessmen: Neville Walker, Leo Venturin, Henry Townshend and James Osbourne. The property was passed in at auction for A$14.5 million; at this time it occupied an area of 4,000 square kilometres (1,544 sq mi) and was managed by Alistair and Rachel Trier. The property sold later the same year for A$15.25 million, the price included the 29,000 head of Brahman and Brahman cross cattle. The buyer was the Texas-based Tejas Land and Cattle Company, represented in Australia by Milton Jones.

== See also ==
- List of ranches and stations
