= Djaru language =

Australian Aboriginal language

Djaru
- Native to: Western Australia
- Region: southeast Kimberley
- Ethnicity: Djaru people
- Native speakers: 217 (2016 census)
- Language family: Pama–Nyungan: Ngumpin–Yapa; Ngumpin; Djaru
- Dialects: Djaru (Tjaru); Wawarl; Njininj (Nyininy)

Language codes
- ISO 639-3: ddj
- Glottolog: jaru1254
- AIATSIS: K12
- ELP: Jaru

Djaru (Tjaru) is a Pama–Nyungan language spoken in the south-eastern Kimberley region of Western Australia. As with most Pama-Nyungan languages, Djaru includes single, dual and plural pronoun numbers. Djaru also includes sign-language elements in its lexicon (a common trait of Aboriginal Australian languages generally). Nouns in Djaru do not include gender classes, and apart from inflections, words are formed through roots, compounding or reduplication. Word order in Djaru is relatively free (again a common trait of Aboriginal Australian languages) and has the ability to split up noun phrases. The Djaru language has a relatively small number of verbs, as compared to most languages, and thus utilizes a system of 'preverbs' and complex verbs to compensate. Djaru also has an avoidance language. Avoidance languages, sometimes known as 'mother-in-law languages', are special registers within a language that are spoken between certain family members (typically a married man and his mother-in-law) – such registers are common throughout native Australian languages.

The population of Djaru speakers has greatly diminished since the late 19th century when white settlers entered the Djaru region and massacred its inhabitants. The Djaru people have since adopted certain aspects of western living (working and living on farmsteads and in towns) and have moved away from the daily practice of certain traditional ways of living. As a result, the Djaru language faces the combined pressures of a decrease in speaker population, an increased reliance of English among its speakers, as well as a white Australian government that has traditionally stood against the use or education of any original Australian languages.

== Phonology ==
Word-initial phonemes in Djaru may be any consonant or semi-vowel with the exception of alveolar taps /ɾ/ or the palatal laterals /ʎ/. A word can end with any phoneme except for a semi-vowel.

Stress occurs on the initial syllable of a word, and on the initial syllable of a second morpheme. A stressed syllable tends to also be the highest in pitch, but stress in Djaru, as with pitch, is phonologically irrelevant. That is, stress and pitch have no essential bearing on a word's meaning.

Djaru does not contain any of the fricatives (e.g. [f], [v], [ʃ], [ð]) or affricates (e.g. [pf], [ts]); these sound types are rarely found in any Australian Aboriginal languages.

=== Consonants ===
Phonemes
	labial	alveolar	retroflex	palatal	velar
stops	b	d	ɖ	ɟ	ɡ
nasals	m	n	ɳ	ɲ	ŋ
lateral		l	ɭ	ʎ	
tap/flap		ɾ	ɽ		
semivowels				j	w

Djaru consonants form clusters of no more than two phonemes.

/ɽ/ can be heard as a flap [ɽ] or a glide [ɻ].

=== Vowels ===
Vowels
	Front	Back
High	i	u
Low	a, aː	

Djaru, like most Australian languages, has only three vowel sounds (a high-front vowel, high-back vowel, and low vowel), each vowel varies considerably according to its immediate phonetic environment.

== Word classes ==
Djaru includes the following word classes: noun, free pronoun, adverb, preverb, verb, particle, interjection.

=== Nouns ===
Nouns in Djaru are modified if they are instrumental, locative, recipients, or in ergative position. The term 'ergative' refers to a category within ergative-absolutive declension wherein objects of transitive sentences and subjects of intransitive sentences are not morphologically equivalent to subjects of intransitive sentences. That is, in an ergative-absolutive language, if a noun in intransitive subject position (or transitive object position) is X, then it will be Y in a transitive subject position. Examples of the ergative-absolutive system for nouns in Djaru can be found in Tsunoda 1981:

mawun jan-an
man-ABS go-PRES
'a man goes'

mawun-du ɟaɟi lan-an
man-ERG kangaroo-ABS spear-PRES
'a man spears a kangaroo'

(Free pronouns also display an ergative-absolutive case system)

The possible ways to modify a noun into ergative case are with the following suffixes: -ŋgu, -gu, -lu, -gulu, -du, -u. The use of each morpheme depends, of course, on the immediately preceding phonological environment.

For Pama-Nyungan languages generally it is common that they will take an ergative-absolutive case marking for nouns, and a nominative-accusative case marking for pronouns.

=== Verbs ===
There are very few verbs in Djaru (around forty). Bound pronouns can attach to Djaru verbs and they display a nominative-accusative declension (Djaru thus displays split ergativity, as its nouns and free pronouns follow an ergative-absolutive pattern).

Verbs conjugate according to the following aspects: past, continuative past, past narrative, present, continuative present, purposive, continuative purposive, hortative, continuative hortative, imperative, continuative imperative, verbid. In the vast majority of cases verbs are modified with suffixes, and all conjugated verbs involve the root + suffix (i.e. there are no conjugations that represent the verb root on its own).

=== Pronouns ===
As is suggested in Blake 1987, the ergative pronoun markings in Djaru may be a relatively new feature of the language, since the system bears few of the irregularities that are present in most languages (compare the following table's ergative variations to the English pronouns, they, them, she, her, etc.).

Pronouns
	Absolutive	Ergative
SG 1	ngatyu	ngatyu-ngku
SG 2	nyuntu	nyuntu-ku
SG 3	nyantu	nyantu-ku
Dual 1 inc.	ngali	ngali-ngku
Dual 1 exc.	Ngatyarra	ngatyarra-lu

=== Preverbs ===
Djaru includes a unique word class (absent in most languages) known as the preverb class. Preverbs have two uses in Djaru: firstly they may be used similarly to adjectives in that they modify verbs but in doing so create new semantic units, secondly they may be used like nouns when attached with nominal suffixes.

Some examples of preverbs: jud ('sitting'), dirib ('camping out'), wuɽug ('finishing').

When combined with verbs, the above preverbs come out with the following meanings:

jud + wandiɲ = {jud wandiɲ}
sitting {} fall {} {sit down}

dirib + ɲin(aŋ) = {dirib ɲin(aŋ)}
{camping out} {} sit {} {camp out}

wuɽug + wandiɲ = {wuɽug wandiɲ}
finishing {} fall {} {the ceasing of rain}

== Syntax ==
=== Word order ===
Simple Djaru sentences typically display a subject–object–verb word order; however, this is not a strict grammatical rule. The verb and object are often swapped around, and in some cases, verbs are not required at all. The following example of a verb-less sentence is from Tasaku Tsunoda, 1981.

ŋaɟu ŋa-ɳa-ŋgu babaji ɲunuŋa
1SG-ABS C-1SG-NOM-2SG-DAT older.brother-ABS 2SG-DAT
'I am an older brother to you'

=== Sentence length ===
It has been noted that typical Djaru clauses are significantly shorter than many other languages, and as a result the speaking style usually involves many conjunctions.

=== Noun phrases ===
[Jalu-ŋgu mawun-du jambi-gu] ɟaɟi lan-i
That-ERG man-ERG big-ERG kangaroo spear-PAST
'That big man speared a kangaroo'

However the noun phrase may be broken up and the same sentences may be expressed as:

Jalu-ŋgu lani-i mawun-du ɟaɟi jambi-gu
'That big man speared a kangaroo'

(Verb phrases containing a preverb may also have other words placed in their midst, i.e. words that are not part of the verb phrase that occur between the preverb and verb)

=== Possessives ===
The Djaru language utilises the syntactic phenomenon of apposition in the case of inalienable object (i.e. body parts or personal attributes).

Ngatyu-ngku nga-rna mawun langka pung-an
1SG-ERG Clitic-1SG:NOM man-ABS head-ABS hit-PRES
'I hit the man’s head'

Note that no morphological modifications are used to indicate that the head belongs to the man, such a relationship between 'man' and 'head' is expressed purely by syntactic positioning. However, nouns attach a genitive suffix when they are possessors of alienable objects (e.g. tables, chairs, clothing, family members etc.). But importantly, the genitive suffix can usually only be used when the possessed object is in the close vicinity of the possessor.

Nyila ngaringka yamparra-yaru
That woman-ABS long.hair.having-ABS
'That woman is long-haired'

== Metaphors ==
Usually, when sensory verbs (see, taste, hear etc.) are used metaphorically – as in, "I see what you mean" or, "I see how this works" – languages almost exclusively use the word for vision in order to express knowledge. But as Evans & Wilkins explain, the Djaru language (along with many Aboriginal Australian languages) go against this trend and use terms for hearing to express knowledge: for example, pina yungan (literally 'ear put') translates as 'to learn'.

== Avoidance language ==
Avoidance languages are a rare phenomenon in human language yet quite common among the original Australian languages. The vocabulary for the Djaru avoidance language is extremely limited as it only consists of one verb, luwaɳ. The verb is semantically neutral and must be inserted into the verb phrase of whatever sentence is spoken in the avoidance language.

== Sign language ==
The Djaru language includes a set of sign-language items in its lexicon. Commonly occurring actions, and commonly sighted animals and objects are represented by finger and hand gestures for the purposes of hunting. Direction can also be expressed by the pointing of lips.

== History ==
The Djaru language of the western Kimberley region is still alive, yet the speakers of Djaru and their culture have not remained unscathed by the destructive advance of colonialism. It has been estimated that as many as 160 Australian languages have died since the European invasion of Australia. This has been largely due to both the sheer number of deaths among the Aboriginal people at the hands of European settlers, and harsh white-government policy banning Aboriginal languages in public places and schools. As of 2006 only around 60 Australian languages are reportedly in use. Towards the end of the 19th century the Djaru region became the target of white settlers. The region was carved up for gold mining and cattle farming, and the original inhabitants became the victims of several massacres. It is estimated that the Djaru population has decreased since then by as much as 50%. The existence of white settlements and farms in the region has had a significant effect on the way of life of the Djaru people. The use of traditional Australian-style tools, housing, and food (bush tucker) has mostly been replaced by modern western equivalents. Also, the use of the avoidance language has drastically diminished, and the traditional method of arranging marriages is not always observed.
