= Mariu people =

Indigenous Australian people of the Northern Territory

The Mariu were an indigenous Australian people of the Northern Territory. Their language is unattested, but may have been Miriwung.

== Country ==
In Norman Tindale's estimation the Mariu's territory covered some 1,800 square miles (4,700 km^{2}) in the area south of where the Victoria River enters the Joseph Bonaparte Gulf. The Bullo River also formed part of their land.

== Social organization ==
In 1900, R. H. Mathews, a surveyor and self-taught anthropologist, presented a paper attributing to the Mariu — together with other "large and important tribes", from both Western Australia and the Northern Territory, such as the Gija, Perrakee, Gooniyandi, Nyigina, Bunuba, Djaru and Walmadjari — an 8 section marriage system among clans, which he illustrated in the following general table.

Phratry	Father	Mother	Son	Daughter
A	Jungurra	Nungulla	Jabulgie	Nabijerry
A	Jackara	Nabijerry	Julimar	Naboron
A	Janima	Naboron	Jungary	Nabungarty
A	Jambidgena	Nabungarty	Jangula	Nungulla
B	Jangula	Nangilee	Jambidgena	Nambidgena
B	Jungary	Nambidgena	Janima	Nabina
B	Julimar	Nabanna	Jackara	Nackara
B	Jabulgie	Nackara	Jungurra	Nangilee

== Alternative names ==
- Mayu
- Mayoo
- Mariung

== Sources ==
- Mathews, R.H. (January 1900). "Divisions of some West Australian tribes". American Anthropologist. 2 (1): 185–187. JSTOR 658875.
- Tindale, Norman Barnett (1974). "Mariu (NT)". Aboriginal Tribes of Australia: Their Terrain, Environmental Controls, Distribution, Limits, and Proper Names. Australian National University.
