= Wickham River =

Wickham
- Location of the Wickham River mouth in the Northern Territory
- Etymology: John Clements Wickham

Location
- Country: Australia
- Territory: Northern Territory
- Region: Victoria Bonaparte (IBRA)

Physical characteristics
- Source: Mount Kimon
  - elevation: 330 m (1,080 ft)
- Mouth: Victoria River
  - coordinates: 17°01′31″S 129°57′52″E
  - elevation: 74 m (243 ft)
- Length: 198 km (123 mi)
- Basin size: 5,018 km^{2} (1,937 sq mi)
- Discharge
  - average: 11.9 m^{3}/s (420 cu ft/s)

Basin features
- Tributaries
  - left: Midnight Creek, Broadarrow Creek, Cusack Creek, Humbert River
  - right: Soda Springs Creek, Depot Creek (Northern Territory), Gibbie Creek
- National park: Judbarra / Gregory NP

The Wickham River is an ephemeral river in the Victoria Bonaparte bioregion of the Northern Territory in Australia.

== Course and features ==
The headwaters of the Wickham River are situated on an area of rugged stony hills and a sandstone plateau as the river rises on the southeastern slopes of Mt Kimon. It flows generally northeast, joined by seven tributaries including the Humbert River, Soda Springs Creek, Depot Creek and Broadarrow Creek and through one permanent waterhole, Johnston Billabong, before reaching its confluence with the Victoria River, south of the Fitzgerald Range near Pompey Knob. The Wickham River descends 256 metres (840 ft) over its 198-kilometre (123 mi) course.

The Judbarra / Gregory National Park was established in 1981 encompassing much of the catchment. Mount Sanford was exhumed to enlarge the park boundaries in 1996.

The Wickham flows for only six months of the year, during the wet season. During the dry season, a string of waterholes form along the course of the river some of which are spring-fed and almost permanent.

When Lawrence Wells started his trigonometric survey of the Northern Territory in 1905 he formed his depot on the Wickham River not too far from Victoria River Downs Station homestead.

The area surrounding the Wickham River are the traditional lands of the Aboriginal community of Yarralin, also known as Walangeri.

== Etymology ==
The river is named in honour of Captain John Clements Wickham who sailed up the 200 kilometres (124 mi) Victoria River in 1839 aboard HMS Beagle.

== See also ==
- List of rivers of Australia § Northern Territory
