= Gurindji language =

Australian Aboriginal language

Gurindji
- Gurinji, Korindji, Garundji, Kuurrinjtji
- Native to: Northern Territory, Australia
- Region: Victoria River and Wave Hill, Kalkaringi
- Ethnicity: Gurindji, Ngarinyman, Malngin, Wandjira, Bilingara
- Native speakers: 620 (2021 census)
- Language family: Pama–Nyungan: Ngumpin–Yapa; Ngumpin; Gurindji
- Dialects: Eastern Gurindji; Wanjdjirra; Malngin; Wurlayi; Ngarinyman; Bilinarra; ?Kartangarurru

Language codes
- ISO 639-3: Either: gue – Gurinji nbj – Ngarinyman
- Glottolog: guri1247 Gurindji ngar1235 Ngarinman
- AIATSIS: C20 Gurindji (cover term), C27 Ngarinyman (cover term)
- ELP: Gurindji
- Ngarinyman

Gurindji /ɡʊˈrɪndʒi/ is a Pama–Nyungan language spoken by the Gurindji and Ngarinyman people in the Northern Territory, Australia. The language of the Gurindji is highly endangered, with about 592 speakers remaining and only 175 of those speakers fully understanding the language. There are in addition about 60 speakers of Ngarinyman dialect. Gurindji Kriol is a mixed language that derives from the Gurindji language.

Patrick McConvell writes: "Traditional Gurindji today is only generally spoken in private contexts between older people, although it is occasionally used in speeches and newly composed songs."

Patrick McConvell also states: "Gurindji has been taught intermittently for short periods as a subject in the local school over the last twenty-five years but mostly has had no role in the curriculum or in official community functions."

The Gurindji language has borrowed many words from surrounding languages such as Gajirrabeng, Ngaliwurru, Jaminjung, Jaru, Miriwung, and Wardaman.

== Classification ==
The Gurindji language is classified under the Pama-Nyungan languages family – as opposed to the Non-Pama-Nyungan languages family, as Indigenous Australia was largely divided into these two classifications.

Gurindji is further classified as a member of the Ngumpin-Yapa sub-group of Pama-Nyungan.

"Gurindji is part of the Eastern Ngumpin branch of the Nyungan-Yapa sub-group. The Eastern Ngumpin languages are among the most northernly Pama-Nyungan languages, in contact with the Non-Pama-Nyungan languages to the north, west, and east."

The last division of the Eastern Ngumpin branch in which Gurindji is a part of is the Victoria River branch.

== Geographic distribution ==
Gurindji is spoken by approximately 592 people, according to the Australian Bureau of Statistics 2006 Census, in Northern Territory, Australia. More specifically, in the Victoria River District where "Wattie Creek or Dagaragu was chosen as the destination of the walk-off. Later, Kalkaringi was set up about eight kilometers away on the Victoria River as a town to service the nearby stations. Many Gurindji moved to Kalkaringi and now both Kalkaringi and Dagaragu are home to the Gurindji. Kalkaringi contains most of the facilities such as the Community Office, school, abattoir, garage, and shops. The CDEP office, a bakery, and Batchelor Institute facilities can be found at Dagaragu."

=== Varieties ===
Gurindji is part of a dialect chain going west, and includes:

- Wanjdjirra
- Malngin
- Wurlayi
- Ngarinman
- Bilinarra
- Kartangarurru

=== Derived languages ===
The child language of Gurindji is the mixed language Gurindji Kriol. The switching of languages was noticed by Patrick McConvell between the 1960s and 1980s, and is thought to have emerged from the establishment of the cattle stations by the non-Indigenous colonists. Gurindji Kriol is spoken by Gurindji people below the age of 35, as they understand Gurindji but do not speak it in its traditional form.

== Phonology ==
According to the University of Melbourne School of Languages and Linguistics, "Phonologically, Gurindji is a fairly typical Pama-Nyungan language. It contains stops and nasals which have five corresponding places of articulation (bilabial, apico-alveolar, retroflex, palatal and velar), three laterals (apico-alveolar, retroflex, palatal), two rhotics (trill/flap and retroflex continuant), two semivowels (bilabial and palatal) and three vowels (a, i, u). Combinations of semivowels and vowels produce diphthong-like sounds. Like most Pama-Nyungan languages, Gurindji is notable because it contains no fricatives or a voicing contrast between stops. Stress is word initial, and syllables pattern CV, CVC or CVCC."

=== Consonants ===
	Peripheral		Laminal	Apical	
	Labial	Velar	Palatal	Alveolar	Retroflex
Stop	b~p	ɡ~k	ɟ~c	d~t	ɖ~ʈ
Nasal	m	ŋ	ɲ	n	ɳ
Lateral			ʎ	l	ɭ
Rhotic				ɾ~r	
Approximant	w		j		ɻ

- With the exception of /k/ in word-initial position, stop sounds are typically voiced, and are mainly heard as voiceless when in word-final position.

=== Vowels ===
	Front	Back
High	i iː	ʊ ʊː
Low	ɐ ɐː	

- Vowels in unstressed position are heard as a central [ə] sound.
- /ɐ/ can be heard as fronted sounds [æ, ɛ, e] when before or after a palatal consonant. When before or after a velar consonant, /ɐ/ is often backed and rounded and realized as [ʊ, ɔ].
- /i/ can sometimes be heard as [ɪ], and can be heard as rounded and backed [ʉ, ʊ] when within the environment of a labial consonant.
- /ʊ/ can be heard as centralized [ʉ], or fronted as [ɪ] when within the environment of a palatal consonant.

== Grammar ==
According to the University of Melbourne School of Languages and Linguistics, "Gurindji is a dependent marking language. Word order is relatively free, though constrained by discourse functions. The verb phrase is made up of a free coverb and an inflecting verb which contains information about tense, mood, modality. Bound pronouns also attach to the inflecting verb to cross reference subjects and objects for person and number. These pronouns inflect for nominative and accusative case, unlike free pronouns whose form only changes for dative case.

The noun phrase may contain nouns, adjectives, demonstratives and free pronouns. Case marking for nouns is ergatively patterned, and generally other elements in the noun phrase must agree with noun's case."

=== Morphology ===
Felicity Meakins states, "Gurindji is an agglutinating language which employs only suffixes and enclitics."

She also found the list of suffixes and case suffixes in the Gurindji language:

- Ergative
- Dative
- Locative
- Allative
- Ablative

=== Syntax ===
Felicity Meakins found Gurindji exhibits all of the properties of non-configurationality. Word order is relatively free, as the ordering of constituents is flexible. For example, the Gurindji word wumara 'rock' can appear pre-verbally in clause-initial position (1) and in clause-final position (2):

(1) Wumara waj yuwa-na-na ngawa-ngkurra: 'He throws the rock into the water.'

(2) Ngawa-ngkurra waj yuwa-na-na wumara: 'He throws the rock into the water.'

Felicity Meakins also determined word order is largely determined by information structure rather than phrasal structure. The left periphery of the clause is generally associated with prominent information. The second position pronominal clitic provides a transition between more and less prominent information.

== Lexicon ==
There are many words and expressions in the Gurindji language that have a complex meaning and usage that cannot be replicated in English.

An example found in National Indigenous Languages Survey Report is the Gurindji word for 'law' (yumi) "encompasses not just what we might call civil and criminal 'law' but the ways of behavior and social control with regard to kin and the land that was bestowed by the ancestors and Dreamings."

Another difference in Gurindji and English vocabularies is the words used to indicate left and right. As Felicity Meakins discovered, "Gurindji doesn't have terms for left and right, but has 24 different words each for north, south, east and west."

Lastly, kinship systems, or the varying words to describe familial relationships are much different than in English. There are many more words than simply 'father', 'brother' and 'sister' as Gurindji people have many fathers, brothers and sisters. This is due to the fact that anyone who is in a person's life for a long time is included in the kinship system.

== Examples ==
The following Gurindji words, their definitions, and the sample sentences in Gurindji and English come from the Gurindji Multimedia Database:

1. jalak yuwanana: cv. 'send'. Ngayiny-ku jipiniya-wu ngurna-rla jalak yuwarru jarrakap milimili. 'I sent a letter to my boyfriend'.
2. kalu: cv. 'walk'. Kalu-ngkurra-warla ngurna-rla jalngak waninya yawarta-la. 'I got on the horse while it was walking'.
3. malykmalyk manana: cv. 'sprinkle with water'. Malymalyk mani ngawa-ngku nyila kalnga. 'He sprinkled the red ochre with water.'
4. walima: quest. 'how about'. Walima-nta ngapaku-wu-ma? 'Do any of you want water?'
5. yarrpuru: cv. 'convalesce, recover from sickness'. Variant: yarrpu; yarrapuru; yarrpuyarrpu. Yarrapuru-nginyi ngurna wankaj-pa-rningan. 'Having recovered, I'm sick again.'

== Bibliography ==
- Jones, Caroline; Schultze-Berndt, Eva; Denniss, Jessica; Meakins, Felicity (2019). Ngarinyman to English Dictionary. Aboriginal Studies Press. ISBN 9781925302813.
- Meakins, Felicity; Nordlinger, Rachel (2014). A Grammar of Bilinarra: An Australian Aboriginal Language of the Northern Territory. Walter de Gruyter. ISBN 978-1-614-51274-5.
