= Monash University Publishing =

Academic publisher

- Parent company: Monash University Publishing
- Founded: 2003 (as Monash University ePress); 2010 (as Monash University Publishing)
- Country of origin: Australia
- Distribution: Monash University
- Publication types: Books
- Official website: publishing.monash.edu

Monash University Publishing is a university press supported by Monash University (Melbourne, Australia). The press was originally founded in 2003 as the "Monash University ePress" before it was re-organized by Nathan Hollier in 2010 and renamed "Monash University Publishing". The press is a member of the Association of University Presses.

== See also ==
- List of English-language book publishing companies
- List of university presses
