= Victoria River Downs Station =

Pastoral lease in the Northern Territory

Coordinates: 16°24′15″S 131°00′49″E

Location in Northern Territory

Victoria River Downs Station, also known as Victoria Downs and in the past sometimes referred to as The Big Run, is a pastoral lease that operates as a cattle station in the Northern Territory of Australia, established in 1883.

It is 686 kilometres (426 mi) south of Darwin by road.

== History ==
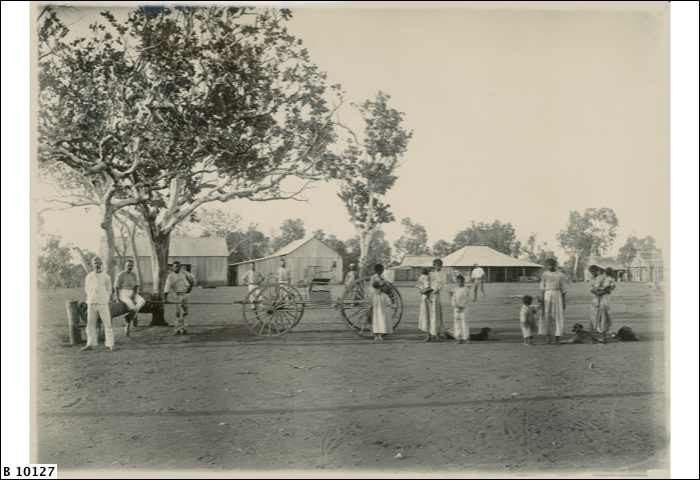
Victoria River Downs Head Station 1891

The station was originally established in 1883 on the lands of the Bilingara and Karranga peoples by Charles Fisher and Maurice Lyons, who also owned nearby Glencoe Station. The men stocked the property with 20,000 head of cattle that had been overlanded from Wilmot by Nat Buchanan. The lease had been granted by the South Australian government in December 1879 for an area of land 15,890 square miles (41,155 km^{2}). Fisher ran into monetary problems and following legal battles the property was awarded to Goldsbrough Mort & Co in 1889. In early 1900 Goldsbrough sold the lease and the stock for £27,500 to a syndicate consisting of Forrest, Emmanuel & Company and the Kidman Brothers.

In 1893 the station was carrying an estimated herd of 23,000 cattle and by 1894 the station occupied an area of 21,000 square kilometres (8,108 sq mi), carried 30,000 head of cattle and some 500 horses. The station was shipping cattle at this time to Batavia via Singapore along with other stations in the area, in 1894 the station shipped 2,205 head for which they were paid £7717.

In March 1895, Goldsbrough Mort & Co. employed the notorious Jack Waston to manage the station. Watson had such a "bad name among the blacks" that the Aboriginal people used as cheap labour on the station had all run away. Even his own "blackboy" servant named Pompey had cleared out. When Watson later heard that Pompey had been killed, he asked the local mounted police constable, William Willshire to bring him Pompey's skull so he could use it as a spittoon. Willshire complied with the request and brought him the skull.

In May 1895, a group of Aboriginal people attacked a supply wagon travelling through nearby Jasper Gorge. Two colonists were seriously wounded and a significant amount of firearms and ammunition were taken. It was thought that with these weapons, a formidable local Aboriginal uprising could result. Before the police could act, Jack Watson decided to organise a punitive expedition himself, to punish those involved and also try to recover the guns. He gathered 17 armed and mounted men and in two days tracked down a large camp of Aboriginal people, fatally shooting possibly 60 people. Watson did not find any guns but he did return with three captured women. One of these women had a broken arm, another was covered in welts from being whipped and the third was lactating from her breasts but no child was with her. These women later escaped.

Watson died in the Katherine River in 1896 and his brother, Robert Molesworth Watson, took over the management of Victoria River Downs.

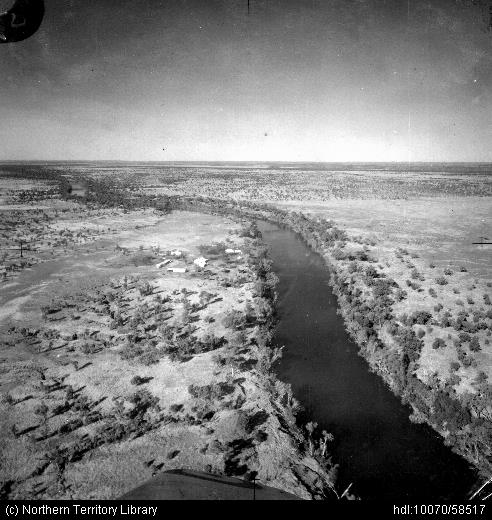
Aerial view of Victoria River Downs station, airfield and Wickham River 1938

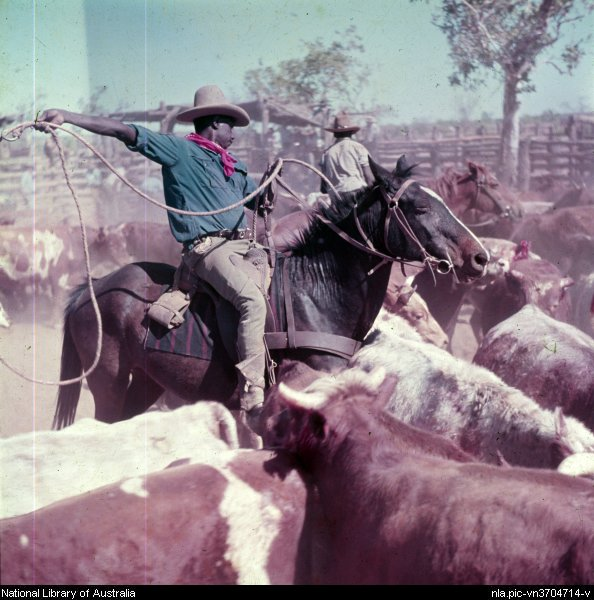
Handling of fully grown cleanskin cattle which had been captured in trap yard, 1953

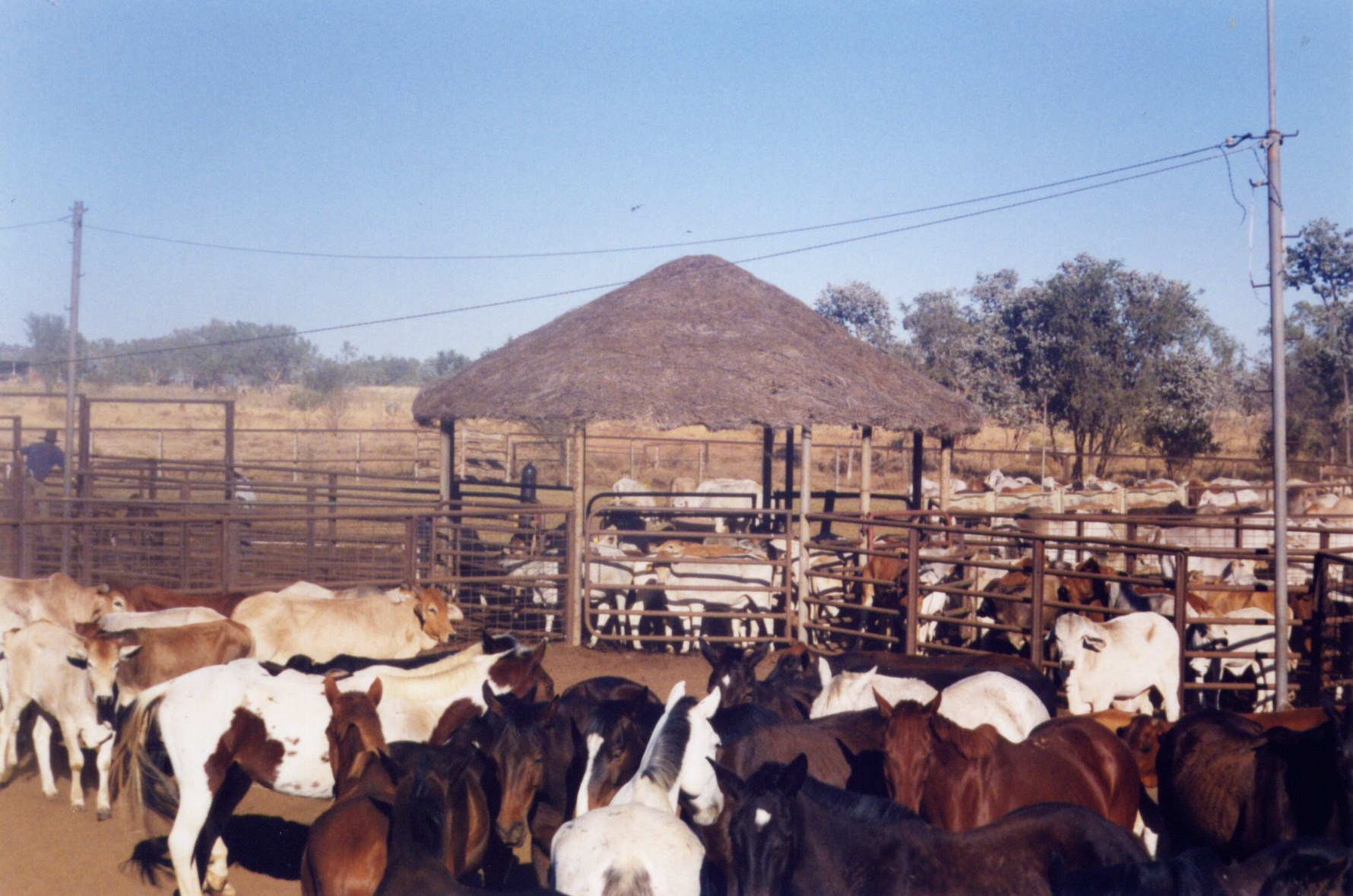
Cattle and horses in stockyards at Victoria River Downs circa 1985

By 1901 the station was carrying about 30,000 head of cattle. and by 1907 Victoria River Downs was stocked with an estimated 69,350 head of cattle.

In 1902 a partnership between Sidney Kidman and the Emanuel brothers acquired the property which occupied an area of 10,954 square miles (28,371 km^{2}) and was regarded as one of the largest cattle stations in the world.

Sidney Kidman sold Victoria River Downs to Bovril Australian Estates in 1909 along with another two stations, one being Northcote and the other in Western Australia near Wyndham called Carlton Hill for a total of £200,000.

By 1923 the size of the property was estimated at 13,100 square miles (33,929 km^{2}) making it the largest property in the Northern Territory at the time. In 1949 the Surveyor General of the Northern Territory, R. Miller, arrived to resume an area of 3,000 square miles (7,770 km^{2}) from the eastern side of the property. Parts of the property have since been carved up leaving an area of 12,000 square kilometres (4,633 sq mi).

William Buckland, a Melbourne businessman, purchased the property in 1955 and then sold again in 1960 to Hooker Corporation. When changes were made to the lease in 1961 the Animal Production Branch approached the Hooker Pastoral Company to excise a small portion of the lease to establish a research station. The 314 square kilometres (121 sq mi) area was surrendered in 1963. It was named the Victoria river Research Station in 1965 but is commonly referred to as Kidman Springs. The research station commenced operations 1969. In 1984, the station was sold again, this time to Peter Sherwin for A$11.6 million. Kerry Packer had sought to buy the property and had negotiated the sale agreement with Hooker but the Northern Territory government invoked its right of veto sale of large parcels of land and instead gave Sherwin approval. Packer acquired Newcastle Waters instead.

Sherwin was subject to a takeover bid by Elders in 1988 and Elders gave a 17.4% share in the property to Robert Holmes à Court, by 1989 Holmes à Court owned all of Victoria River Downs which today trades as Heytesbury Beef.

The station and surrounding areas were pounded with heavy rains in February 2010, receiving 747 millimetres (29 in) over the course of the month. This figure was the highest monthly total ever in the 120 years that rainfall has been recorded at Victoria River Downs, and smashed the previous record set in 2004.

In 2014 the property experienced 88 consecutive days with temperatures over 35 °C (95 °F) between the September and November.

== Location and description ==
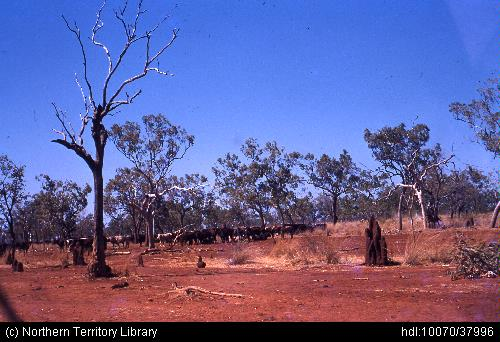
Cattle in the scrub on the station

Victoria River Downs Station is located about 102 kilometres (63 mi) south east of Timber Creek and 252 kilometres (157 mi) west of Daly Waters in the Northern Territory. The property abuts the Daguragu Aboriginal Land Trust to the south, Camfield Station, Montejinni and Killarney Stations to the east, Delamere to the north and Humbert River Station and the Bilinarra-Jutpurra Aboriginal Land Trust to the west. The Auvergne and Wave Hills Stock routes both pass through the station as does the Buntine Highway that passes through the south east corner.

Victoria River Downs Station has in the past been referred to as The Big Run. As of February 2004, it had an area of 8,900 square kilometres (3,436 sq mi) The property was once the world's largest pastoral property, with an area of 41,000 square kilometres (15,830 sq mi), but following much of the land being resumed it was less than half its former size by 2004, at that time less than half the size of the then largest, Anna Creek Station in South Australia.

Its name derives from the Victoria River, a major river system and floodplain. Several watercourses (mainly tributaries of the Victoria) pass through the property, including the Wickham River, Camfield River, Townsend River, Humbert River, Gill Creek, Blackskin Creek, Depot Creek, Jasper Creek and Battle Creek.

The property is composed of several land types including ridges and plateaus on sandstone or dolomite, gently undulating plains of dolomite overlaid with loamy soils, limestone outcrops and alluvial floodplains with cracking clays. Vegetation includes wire grass, white grass and black spear grass on the red earth country with stands of ribbon grass, flinders grass, blue grass and feathertop wire grass on the clay country.

The station was as of 2012 owned by Heytesbury The eastern boundary of Victoria River Downs adjoins Killarney Station, Killarney was excised from Victoria Downs when the station exceeded 10,000 square miles (25,900 km^{2}) in size. The much smaller 1,000 square kilometres (386 sq mi) Humbert River station is on the western boundary.

The station is served by the Victoria River Downs Airport.

== Outstations ==
=== Camfield Station ===
Camfield Station was also once an outstation of Victoria Downs, now owned by the Australian Agricultural Company. This station occupies an area of 2,790 square kilometres (1,077 sq mi) and was won in a ballot in 1952 by Paul Vanderleer before having a series of owners, then was finally acquired by AACo. in 2004.

=== Pigeon Hole ===
Pigeon Hole Station (181,100 hectares (448,000 acres)) was until 2000 an outstation of Victoria River Downs. Pigeon Hole is as of 2023 an Aboriginal settlement, inhabited by Gurindji and Ngarinyman people. In August 2024 it was formally renamed Nitjpurru, its Bilinarra language name and the name of a billabong just north of the community.

In late February to early March 2023, heavy rains fell over the area. The upper Victoria River exceeded major flood levels at Kalkarindji, and evacuations were ordered for residents of Daguragu, Kalkarindji, Pigeon Hole, and Palumpa. First, Daguaragu and Pigeon Hole were fully evacuated to Kalkarindji, whence two aeroplanes of the Australian Defence Force carried evacuees out of Kalkarindji to Katherine. They then travelled by bus to Darwin, to be accommodated at the Centre of National Resilience in Howard Springs.

== Climate ==
Climate data for Victoria River Downs, elevation 89 m (292 ft), (1991–2020 normals, extremes 1965–present)
Month	Jan	Feb	Mar	Apr	May	Jun	Jul	Aug	Sep	Oct	Nov	Dec	Year
Record high °C (°F)	44.4 (111.9)	43.9 (111.0)	43.2 (109.8)	40.9 (105.6)	38.3 (100.9)	36.9 (98.4)	37.7 (99.9)	39.2 (102.6)	41.4 (106.5)	44.9 (112.8)	45.4 (113.7)	44.9 (112.8)	45.4 (113.7)
Mean daily maximum °C (°F)	36.0 (96.8)	35.3 (95.5)	35.4 (95.7)	34.9 (94.8)	32.0 (89.6)	29.5 (85.1)	29.8 (85.6)	31.9 (89.4)	36.1 (97.0)	37.9 (100.2)	38.6 (101.5)	37.4 (99.3)	34.6 (94.2)
Mean daily minimum °C (°F)	24.8 (76.6)	24.5 (76.1)	23.2 (73.8)	19.9 (67.8)	15.3 (59.5)	11.8 (53.2)	11.0 (51.8)	12.4 (54.3)	18.4 (65.1)	22.3 (72.1)	24.6 (76.3)	25.3 (77.5)	19.5 (67.0)
Record low °C (°F)	15.9 (60.6)	17.0 (62.6)	12.7 (54.9)	9.3 (48.7)	4.0 (39.2)	2.2 (36.0)	1.3 (34.3)	2.7 (36.9)	5.5 (41.9)	10.5 (50.9)	14.2 (57.6)	15.1 (59.2)	1.3 (34.3)
Average rainfall mm (inches)	204.6 (8.06)	230.1 (9.06)	113 (4.4)	28.0 (1.10)	4.9 (0.19)	3.8 (0.15)	1.7 (0.07)	0.1 (0.00)	4.7 (0.19)	26.3 (1.04)	58.7 (2.31)	143.2 (5.64)	819.1 (32.21)
Average rainy days (≥ 1.0 mm)	12	12	8.0	2.0	0.7	0.3	0.2	0.1	0.6	2.9	5.9	10.6	55.3
Source: Australian Bureau of Meteorology

== See also ==
- List of ranches and stations
- List of the largest stations in Australia
