= Victoria River Downs Airport =

Airport in Northern Territory Australia

- IATA: VCD; ICAO: YVRD

Summary
- Airport type: Public
- Owner: Heytesbury Beef
- Serves: Victoria River Downs Station
- Elevation AMSL: 291 ft (89 m)
- Coordinates: 16°24′12″S 131°00′12″E

Map
- Location in the Northern Territory

Runways
Direction	Length		Surface
Direction	ft	m	Surface
09/27
- Sources: AIP

Victoria River Downs Airport (IATA: VCD, ICAO: YVRD) is an airport in Victoria River, Northern Territory, Australia which serves the Victoria River Downs Station.

The airport is the primary base for Heli-Muster NT, who specialise in aerial mustering and charter work. The company maintains a fleet of Robinson helicopters, fixed wing aircraft and supporting engineering staff out of a hangar at VRD.
