= Ngarinman =

Australian Aboriginal people of Yarralin, NT

The Ngarinman or Ngarinyman people are an Aboriginal Australian people of the Northern Territory who spoke the Ngarinyman language.

== Country ==
According to an estimate made by Norman Tindale, the Ngarinman held some 4,000 square miles (10,000 km^{2}) of territory. Their central domain was the Wickham River, an early writer, W. Willshire, placing them to the west of that ephemeral watercourse. Tindale adds that they inhabited the area of the Upper Victoria River, about Jasper Creek, and to the west of the Victoria River Downs, and places their southern boundary at Munjun (Mount Sanford). Their western frontier lay at Limbunya.

== Language ==
An Australian Institute of Aboriginal and Torres Strait Islander Studies (AIATSIS) project to counteract loss of Indigenous languages has helped produce a Ngarinyman to English Dictionary in 2019.

== Alternative names ==
- Ngainman, Ngainmun
- Ngrainmun
- Hainman (local white exonym)
- Hyneman
- Narinman, Nariman

== See also ==
- Ngumpit, a name used by the Gurindji, Malngin, Bilinara, Mudburra and Ngarinyman peoples to refer to themselves as a group

== Sources ==
- Kaberry, Phyllis M. (1939). Aboriginal Women: Sacred and Profane. Philadelphia: Blackiston.
- Spencer, Baldwin (1914). Native tribes of the Northern Territory of Australia (PDF). London: Macmillan Publishers.
- Stanner, W. E. H. (June 1936). "A Note on Djamindjung Kinship and Totemism". Oceania. 6 (4): 441–451. doi:10.1002/j.1834-4461.1936.tb00204.x. JSTOR 40327576.
- Tindale, Norman Barnett (1974). "Ngarinman (NT)". Aboriginal Tribes of Australia: Their Terrain, Environmental Controls, Distribution, Limits, and Proper Names. Australian National University Press. ISBN 978-0-708-10741-6.
- Willshire, W. H. (1896). Land of the dawning. Adelaide: W. J. Thomas & Co.
