= Ngumpin–Yapa languages =

Family of Pama-Nyungan languages

Ngumpin–Yapa
- Ngarrka–Ngumpin
- Geographic distribution: Pilbara region, Australia
- Linguistic classification: Pama–Nyungan: Desert Nyungic; Ngumpin–Yapa
- Subdivisions: Ngarrga (Yapa); Ngumbin

Language codes
- Glottolog: ngum1251
- Ngumpin–Yapa languages (green) among other Pama–Nyungan (tan). Ngumpin is the group in the north, and Yapa (Ngarrka) the south. The tan gap in the green is Ngardi.

The Ngumpin–Yapa a.k.a. Ngarrga–Ngumpin languages are a family of Pama–Nyungan languages of the Pilbara region of Australia.

- Ngumpin–Yapa
  - Ngarrga languages (Yapa)
    - Warlmanpa
    - Warlpiri
  - Ngumbin languages
    - Walmajarri
    - Djaru
    - Gurindji
    - Mudburra

Ngardi, once classified as either Ngarrga (2002) or Ngumpin (2004), has been reassigned to the Wati languages.

== Vocabulary ==
Capell (1940) lists the following basic vocabulary items for the Ngumpin–Yapa languages:

gloss	Wolmeri	Jülbre	Djäru (Southern)	Malngin	Ngaɽinman	Mudbura	Gogodja
man	biːn, ŋanbe	waḏi	mawun	ŋumbin	ŋumbin	ŋarga	bundu
woman	maːɳin	dudju	ŋaːriŋga	djänga	bagali	giri	dɔdju
head	waːlu	miläl	laŋga	waːlu	waːluŋ	waːlu	ŋalja
eye	mil	guɽu	milwa	milo	mila	mila	guɽu
nose	djirdji	mulja	djirdji	djirdji	djirdji	djirdji	djirdji
mouth	gaɳɖalgudal	jira	lira, djawi	barara	lira	baraːrg	lira
tongue	djulaṉ	ŋalana	djälaṉ	djälaṉ	djälaṉ	djälaɳ	djälaṉ
stomach	ŋaːru	djuni	munda	munda	munda	madjula	munda
bone	gudji	darga	gudji	gudji	gudji	gujuwan	juŋguɽu
blood	nuŋu	jilgu	gjaːwili	guŋulu	ŋurinjin	guŋulu	jälju
kangaroo	wandjiri	madjiri	djädji	djiːa	djiːa	djiːa	maɭu
opossum	djämbidjin		ŋungudi	ŋurgudi	djaŋana	ŋurgudi	mala
emu	ganaŋandja		wanjaru	wanjaru	ibaradu	ŋäɽin	
crow	waŋgan	djägilgäda	wangura	wagwag	wagwag	waŋgurinja	ganga
fly	bunmuɽ	ŋurin	ŋurin, muru	ŋurin	ŋurin, gunama	gunuŋa	mɔŋu
sun	bɽaŋu	banal	walur	gaŋirin	wulŋan	waŋgu	ŋeːlir
moon	gilinman	rogaŋga	järŋan	djälaːɳ	djägilin	baɖaŋara	girindji
fire	waɭu	waɽu	djawu	djawi	djawi	djawi, waɭu	waɽu
smoke	duwi	ŋundjur	ŋundjur	djuŋgaɖ	djuŋgaɖ	djuŋgaidj	djänjuŋu
water	ŋaba	galju	ŋaba	ŋaːwa	ŋaːwa	ŋogo	gabi, jura
