= Sam Croker =

Australian stockman and drover (1852–1892)

Samuel Burns Croker (20 June 1852 – 20 September 1892) was an Australian stockman and drover in Queensland and the Northern Territory. He was known as "Greenhide Sam Croker", because of his skill in working with greenhide, the untanned hide of an animal. He often worked alongside Nat Buchanan and, together, they 'pioneered' the Murranji Track in 1886. A participant in several massacres, he was killed by Aboriginal stockman Charlie Flannigan on Auvergne Station.

== Early life ==
Croker was born at Dungowan Station, near Tamworth in New South Wales, and was the son of John and Martha Croker who were Scottish immigrants. The family moved numerous times during Croker's early life.

== Life in the Northern Territory ==
Croker began working with Nat Buchanan in 1877, and became considered his 'right-hand man', and in the same year they became the first Europeans to cross the Barkly Tableland. Croker was then employed on a number of Buchanan's properties, including Wave Hill Station (which was established in 1882), where it is recorded that he was involved in reprisals and massacres of the Gurindji people living there. One such recorded incident, shortly after the establishment of the station, was when Croker shot a man in the back for attempting to take a bucket.

In 1882 he was also involved in the Red Lilly Lagoon Massacre on Elsey Station in which, in reprisal for the 15 July death of Duncan Campbell in which 20 Mangarayi people were killed. During this massacre Croker assisted Augustus Lucanus; Charlie Flannigan is believed to have been in this area and escaped them at the time.

An earlier recorded incident was in December 1878, at Glencoe Station, where Croker led a reprisal massacre following the death of station hand William Travers. In this massacre Croker killed many local Aboriginal people whether they had been involved in Travers' death or not.

At the time of his death Croker was 40 and was the acting manager of Auvergne Station, while the manager Jack Watson was away. He had brought with him Flannigan, who he had known for some time and had recruited from Wave Hill Station, to construct cattle yards; it was offered as a week of work. In their time together Croker bullied Flannigan and Flannigan later stated, in a statement to police, that Croker would often shoot at cattle close to him to intimidate him.

On the night of Croker's death the two men had an argument over cards and after death Flannigan handed himself over to the authorities and was later sentenced to death and executed at Fannie Bay Gaol on 15 July 1893; this was the first official execution in the Northern Territory. The trial and subsequent execution was covered by media around Australia and was regularly covered in the Northern Territory media.

== Description ==
Gordon Buchanan, the son of Nat Buchanan, described Croker as:

Fair of medium height and wiry build ... a natural backwoodsman, hardy and accustomed to hunt for a live on "bush tucker" all kinds, from dingo and snakes to barramundi and wild duck ... Though not a good tracker, he had all the other bush craft of [an Aboriginal person] ... Not a great stockman and horseman ... yet he was equal to any bush emergency ... never enthusiastic, yet never downhearted, he was generally cheerful, imperturbable, with a tendency to romance, and to chaff and banter.

— Gordon Buchanan giving a description of Sam Croker, from Packhorse & Waterhole (1933)

== Grave ==
Croker's grave is located at Auvergne Station, 59 kilometres (37 mi) from Timber Creek.

== Legacy ==
Croker is remembered in the naming of a number of locations in the Northern Territory:

- Croker Creek, on Wave Hill Station, on Gurindji country, is named for Croker.
- Croker Street, in Katherine, Northern Territory.
- Croker Street, in Nakara, Northern Territory.
