= List of massacres of Indigenous Australians =

Massacres of Australian Aboriginal people

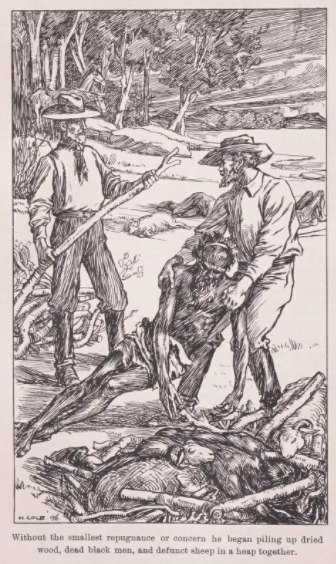
A depiction by Herbert Cole of two Anglo-Australian colonists preparing to burn the bodies of massacred Aboriginal Australians

Colonial settlers frequently clashed with Indigenous people (on continental Australia) during and after the wave of mass immigration of Europeans into the continent, which began in the late 18th century and lasted until the early 20th. Throughout this period, settlers attacked and displaced Indigenous Australians, resulting in significant numbers of Indigenous deaths. These attacks are considered to be a direct and indirect (through displacement and hunger) cause of the decline of the Indigenous population, during an ongoing colonising process of mass immigration and land clearing for agricultural and mining purposes.

There are over 400 known massacres of Indigenous people on the continent. A project headed by historian Lyndall Ryan from the University of Newcastle and funded by the Australian Research Council has been researching and mapping the sites of these massacres. A massacre is defined as "the deliberate and unlawful killing of six or more undefended people in one operation", and an interactive map has been developed. As of October 2024, the number of documented massacres of Aboriginal and Torres Strait Islander people by colonists recorded as having taken place in the period between 1788 and 1930 was 417 (10,372 individuals), while there were 13 massacres of colonists by Aboriginal or Torres Strait Islander people in the same period (160 individuals).

There are also at least 26 recorded instances of mass poisonings of Aboriginal Australians.

The following list tallies some of the massacres (as defined above) of Aboriginal and Torres Strait Islander people by colonial authorities and settlers (or their descendants), most of which took place during the mass-immigration period.

== 1790s – 1890s ==
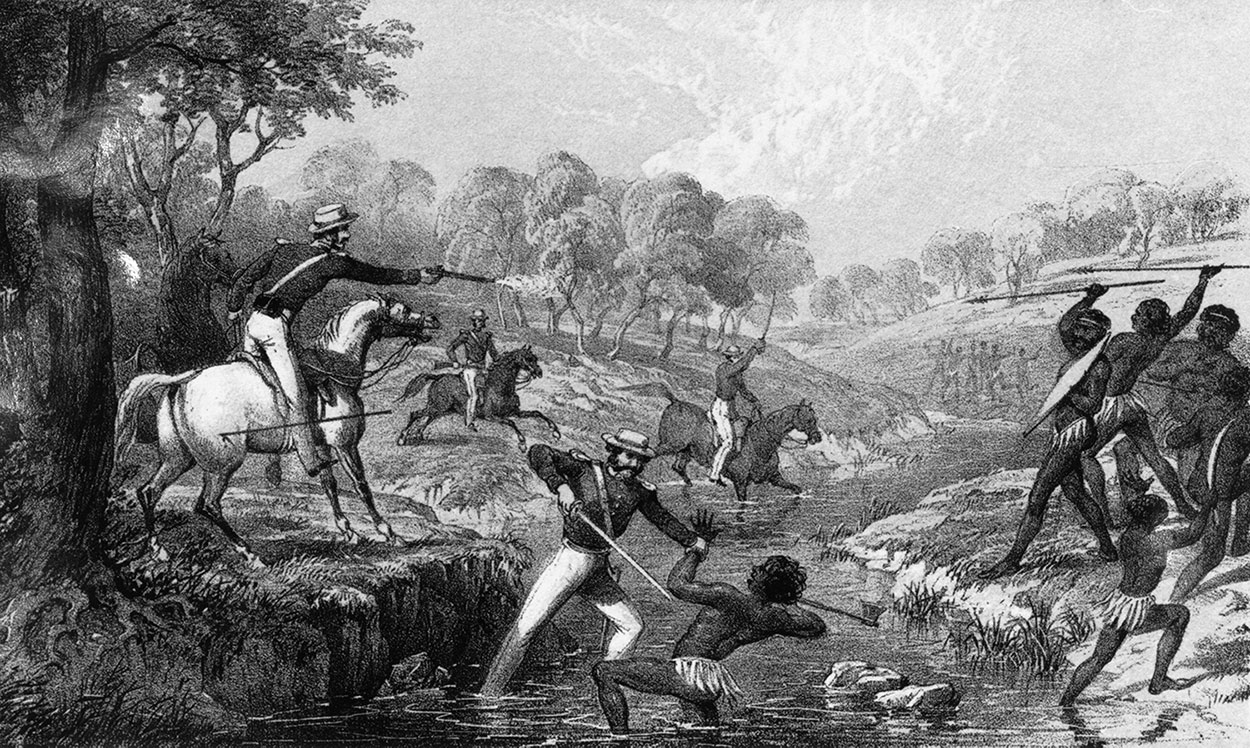
New South Wales Mounted Police killing Aboriginal warriors during the Waterloo Creek massacre of 1838

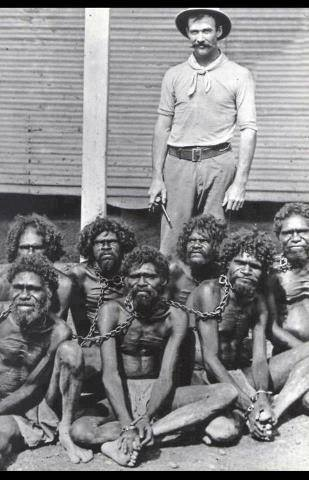
Aboriginal Australians in chains at Wyndham prison, c.1901

=== New South Wales ===
==== 1790s ====
- September 1794. British settlers in the Hawkesbury River area killed seven Bediagal people in reprisal for the theft of clothing and provisions. Some of the surviving children of this raid were taken by the settlers and detained as farm labourers. One boy, who was considered a spy, was later dragged through a fire, thrown into the river and shot dead.
- May 1795. Conflict in the Hawkesbury region continued and following the alleged killing of two settlers, Lieutenant Governor William Paterson ordered two officers and 66 soldiers to "destroy as many as they could meet with ... in the hope of striking terror, to erect gibbets in different places, whereon the bodies of all they might kill were to be hung". Seven or eight Bediagal people were killed. A crippled man, some children and five women (one being heavily pregnant) were taken to Sydney as prisoners. One of the women and her baby had serious gunshot wounds. The child died not long after, as did the newborn baby of the pregnant woman.
- September 1795. In the lower parts of Hawkesbury, British settlers conducted an armed expedition against local Aboriginal Australians, killing five and taking a number of prisoners, again including a badly wounded child.
- March 1797. After Aboriginal Australians killed two British settlers, a large punitive expedition was organised which surprised and dispersed a native camp of about 100 people near what is now called North Rocks, killing an unknown number. The armed group then returned to Parramatta to rest. Pemulwuy, a noted Aboriginal resistance leader of the early frontier, followed them into the town, demanding vengeance for the dispersal. A skirmish (known as the Battle of Parramatta) then occurred between Pemulwuy's group and a collection of British soldiers and settlers. One of the settlers was injured, but at least five Aboriginal Australians were shot dead with many more wounded, including Pemulwuy.
- March 1799. Henry Hacking was ordered by Governor John Hunter to investigate claims of British sailors being trapped by Aboriginal Australians at the mouth of the Hunter River to the north of the colony. Hacking encountered a group of Awabakal people on the south side of the river who informed him that the sailors had left earlier on foot, endeavouring to walk back to Sydney. Hacking did not believe them and became agitated, shooting dead four Awabakal men. The sailors later arrived in Sydney having walked the distance to return.

==== 1800s ====
- March 1806. A group of Yuin people, resident to what the British named Twofold Bay, attempted to forcibly remove a gang of eleven sealers encamped on their land. After spears had been thrown, the sealers opened fire on them with muskets, killing nine, with the remainder fleeing. The bodies were hung overnight from nearby trees, in an attempt to intimidate the other Yuin.

==== 1810s ====
- 1816. Appin Massacre. New South Wales Governor Macquarie sent soldiers against the Gundungurra and Dharawal people on their lands along the Cataract River just south of Sydney, in reprisal for violent conflicts with white settlers (in which several died) in the adjoining Nepean and Cowpastures districts. On 17 April, at around 1 am, the group of soldiers arrived at a camp of Dharawal people, killing at least 16 indigenes by shooting. Many others, including women and children, were driven to fall from the cliffs of the gorge to their deaths below.
- 1818. Minnamurra River massacre. Local settlers attacked and killed at least six members of the Wodiwodi people camped on the banks of the Minnamurra River on the pretext that they were retrieving two muskets lent to a group of Aboriginal people living on the river.

==== 1820s ====
- 1824. Bathurst massacre. Following the killing of seven Europeans by Aboriginal people around Bathurst, New South Wales, and a battle between three stockmen and a warband over stolen cattle which left 16 Aboriginal Australians dead, Governor Brisbane declared martial law to restore order and was able to report a cessation of hostilities in which 'not one outrage was committed under it, neither was a life sacrificed or even Blood spilt'. Part of the tribe trekked down to Parramatta to attend the Governor's annual Reconciliation Day.
- 1826. Around 20 Birpai men, women and children at Blackmans Point. There is no single written account, but the diary of Henry Lewis Wilson, who oversaw convicts in the area, relates that after two convicts sent to work at Blackmans Point were killed by Indigenous men, a party of soldiers "got round the blacks and shot a great many of them, captured a lot of women and used them for a immoral purpose and then shot them. The offending soldiers were sent to Sydney to be tried, but managed to escape punishment.". Historian Lyndall Ryan, after studying other evidence, thinks that the Blackmans Point event referred to by Wilson involved around 20 people, but other massacres in the area may have caused the deaths of up to 300 people.
- 1827. 12 Gringai Aboriginal Australians were shot dead for killing in reprisal a convict who had shot one of their camp dogs dead.
- 1827. A group of 17 colonists led by Benjamin Singleton shot dead 6 Gamilaraay men near what is now Willow Tree on the Liverpool Plains.

==== 1830s ====
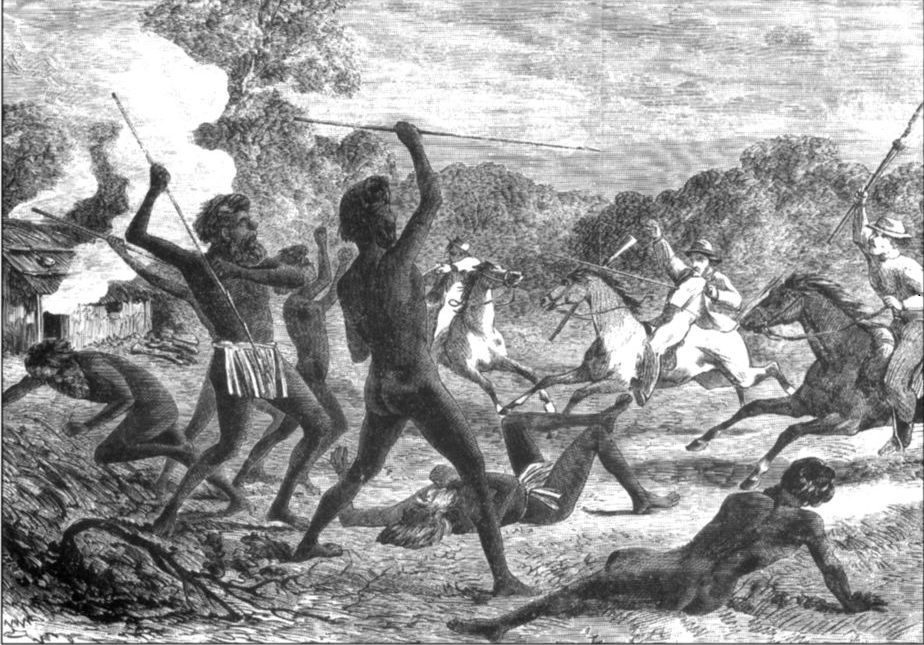
Illustration of the Myall Creek massacre, 1838.

- 18 December 1832. Joseph Berryman, overseer at Sydney Stephen's Murramarang land acquisition near Bawley Point, shot dead four Aboriginal Australians in retaliation for the spearing of some cattle. Of those shot, two were an elderly couple and another was a pregnant woman.
- 1835. Settlers from the Williams Valley are said in a late report (1922) to have surrounded a Gringai camp and forced them all over a cliff at Mount McKenzie near Gloucester Tops. The group of Aboriginal people were massacred in retaliation for the killing of five convict shepherds. A group of local residents, assisted by settlers from Port Stephens, set out to find the Aboriginal people responsible. They found a group of Aboriginal men, women and children camped on the edge of a cliff near the Gloucester River. It was reported that the Aboriginal people leapt to their deaths after being surrounded by settlers. However oral evidence suggests they were shot and thrown over the cliff edge by the settlers. The Mount McKenzie Aboriginal Place was gazetted in 2002 in recognition of the special significance of this site to the local Aboriginal community. A surviving band of the same group was hunted down and killed at the Bowman River. Unburied, their bones could be seen there for years.
- 11 July 1835. The expedition team of Thomas Mitchell, during their journey to the Darling River, fatally shot two Aboriginal Australians after fight over a kettle. Additional shots were fired at the fleeing tribe as they swam across the creek. Mitchell said that the shooting occurred "without much or any effect".
- 27 May 1836. Mount Dispersion massacre. Major Thomas Mitchell felt threatened by a group of around 150 Aboriginal people and divided his expedition team into two groups with about eight men in each group. The first group drove the Aboriginal people into the Murray River, forcing them with gunfire to enter the water to attempt escape. The second group of armed men then reunited with the first and commenced firing at the Aboriginal Australians as they swam across the river. For around five minutes, 16 men fired approximately eighty rounds of ammunition at the fleeing Aboriginal Australians. A government inquiry was organised into the incident after Mitchell published his account of it, but little of consequence resulted. Mitchell subsequently named the area where the shootings occurred Mount Dispersion.
- 26 January 1838. The Waterloo Creek massacre, also known as the Australia Day massacre. A New South Wales Mounted Police detachment, despatched by acting Lieutenant Governor of New South Wales Colonel Kenneth Snodgrass, attacked an encampment of Kamilaroi people at a place called Waterloo Creek in remote bushland. Official reports spoke of between 8 and 50 killed. The missionary Lancelot Threlkeld set the number at 120 as part of his campaign to garner support for his Mission. Threlkeld later claimed Major Nunn boasted they had killed 200 to 300 black Australians, a statement endorsed by historian Roger Milliss. Other estimates range from 40 to 70.
- 1838. Myall Creek massacre – 10 June: 28 people killed at Myall Creek near Bingara, New South Wales. This was the first and only Aboriginal massacre for which settlers were successfully prosecuted. Eleven men were charged with murder but were initially acquitted by a jury. On the orders of the Governor, a new trial was held using the same evidence and seven of the eleven men were found guilty of the murder of one Aboriginal child and hanged. In his book Blood on the Wattle, journalist Bruce Elder says that the successful prosecutions resulted in pacts of silence becoming a common practice to avoid sufficient evidence becoming available for future prosecutions. Another effect, as one contemporary Sydney newspaper reported, was that poisoning Aboriginal people became more common as "a safer practice". Many massacres were to go unpunished due to these practices, as what is variously called a "conspiracy", "pact" or "code of silence" fell over the killings of Aboriginal people.
- 1838. In about the middle of the year at Gwydir River. A "war of extirpation", according to local magistrate Edward Denny Day, was waged all along the Gwydir River in mid-1838. "Aborigines in the district were repeatedly pursued by parties of mounted and armed stockmen, assembled for the purpose, and that great numbers of them had been killed at various spots".
- 28 November 1838. Charles Eyles, William Allen and James Dunn (employees of Gwydir River squatter Robert Crawford) shot dead nine Gamilaraay people just east of present-day Moree. They attempted to burn and bury the remains but these were found a couple of months later. All three men had warrants out for their arrest but the Attorney-General, John Hubert Plunkett, elected not to take the case to trial, ending any possibility of prosecution.
- 1838. In July 1838 men from the Bowman, Ebden and Yaldwyn stations in search of stolen sheep shot and killed 14 Aboriginal people at a campsite near the confluence of the Murrumbidgee and Murray Rivers in New South Wales.

==== 1840s ====
- June 1841. Major Henry Robert Oakes, the Crown Lands Commissioner for the Macleay River District was returning from an overland expedition to the Clarence River with his Border Police troopers, when they encountered some strong Aboriginal resistance. Around 20 Aboriginal people were killed and a Government enquiry was proposed. Oakes' paramilitary brigade had previously shot dead at least three Aboriginal people at William Forster's nearby pastoral run in the preceding year.
- 27 August 1841. The Rufus River massacre, various estimates – between 20 and 40 deaths.
- 24 October 1841. British pastoralists William Lee, Joseph Moulder and Andrew Kerr, together with troopers of the New South Wales Mounted Police conducted a massacre of at least twelve Aboriginal people at Duck Creek on the Bogan River after local Aboriginal men killed three stockmen there.
- 1842. Evans Head massacre or "Goanna Headland massacre", the 1842/1843 European squatters & sawyers massacre of 100 Bundjalung nation tribes people at Evans Head, was variously said to have been in retaliation for the killing of "a few sheep", or the killing of "five European men" from the 1842 "Pelican Creek tragedy".
- From 1838 to 1851. during the spread of pastoral stations along the Macleay River, it is estimated that some 15 massacres took place of the Indigenous peoples of this Djangadi area.
- 29 November 1847. Kangaroo Creek poisoning. Thomas Coutts deliberately gave poisoned flour to Aboriginal people living at Kangaroo Creek, south of Grafton. Twenty-three people died in agony and Coutts was sent for trial in Sydney, but the strong evidence against him was deemed insufficient for the trial to proceed.
- April 1849. Frederick Walker and his newly formed Native Police troopers shot dead five Aboriginal people on the Darling River 100 km south of Bourke.
- 1849. Massacre of Muruwari people at Hospital Creek in Brewarrina district. There are differing accounts of this event, but one alleges that, a white stockman at Walcha Hut (now called Brewarrina), abducted an Aboriginal woman. The stockman was warned by the woman's fellow tribe members to release her. When the stockman refused to release the woman, they were both killed.
- 1849. Massacre of Aboriginal people at Butchers Tree near Brewarrina, along the Barwon River, and on the Narran River.

==== 1850s ====
- 1854. East Ballina massacre. Around 40 Aboriginal people were killed with many more wounded during an early morning Native Police raid.

=== Tasmania ===
(formerly Van Diemen's Land)

==== 1800s ====
- 1804. Risdon Cove massacre. Conflicting evidence of eyewitnesses indicated that either three Aboriginal Tasmanians were killed or "a great many were slaughtered and wounded" on 3 May 1804 at Risdon Cove when a large number came upon the 75–80 colonists there.

==== 1820s ====
- 1827. Near Hadspen on the property of Thomas Beams, Aboriginal people surrounded his hut. In response to his firing at the Aboriginal people Beams' neighbours arrived on foot and horseback. A "war party" was organised and a search conducted. At 10 o'clock at night the glow of a fire was seen and the war party surrounded the Aboriginal encampment. At 3 am fourteen muskets opened fire, the camp was rushed and eleven Aboriginal people were killed. Only one escaped.
- 1828. At Circular Head in Northwest Tasmania the Van Diemen's Land Company dispatched the cutter Fanny in response to the spearing of sheep. The company's Chief Agent, Edward Curr, sent four shepherds along with the cutter's captain and crew in response. A resident of Curr's homestead, Rosalie Hare, described in her journal "...while we remained at Circular Head there were several accounts of considerable amounts of Natives having been shot by them (the Company's men), they wishing to extirpate them entirely, if possible. The master of the Company's cutter Fanny, assisted by four shepherds and his crew, surprised a party and killed 12."
- 1828. On 10 February – Cape Grim massacre, Cape Grim, Van Diemen's Land. Four shepherds of the substantial Van Diemen's Land Company ambushed and killed 30 Pennemukeer Aboriginal people. Company men had killed another 12 Aboriginal people only days earlier. Historian Keith Windschuttle has disputed the numbers and other aspects of the event.
- 1828. On 6 December elements of the 40th Regiment together with two constables, Danvers and Holmes, surrounded a group of Aboriginal people during the night at Tooms Lake. In a dawn attack they killed a number of Aboriginal people variously described as 'several' or ten or sixteen. The bodies were then placed in a pile and burned. Attacking at first light and burning the corpses was to become standard procedure as the frontier moved across Australia.
- In August 1829. John Batman was one of several groups conducting roving sweeps for Aboriginal people. He employed Aboriginal men from the Sydney area to help track and attack the local clans, a system that had proven successful on the mainland and that would continue and eventually evolve into the Native Mounted Police. Batman's patrol came across a large Aboriginal camp of men, women and children at night. Their approach was disturbed by the camp dogs whereupon they opened fire and rushed the camp. They captured a woman and a child but the rest fled into the darkness. The next morning Batman's party found two badly wounded men and many blood trails. The wounded men informed them that ten others had been seriously wounded and were dead or dying and that two women had also been severely wounded and had crawled away. The wounded Aboriginal men were subsequently executed by Batman.
- 1828–1832. The Black War in Van Diemen's Land refers to a period of intermittent conflict between the British colonists, whalers and sealers (including those of the American sealing fleet) and Aboriginal people in the early years of the 19th century. The conflict has been described as a genocide resulting in the elimination of the full-blood Tasmanian Aboriginal population which had numbered somewhere between 1,500 and 22,000 prior to colonisation. On New Year's Eve 1831 the last of the eastern tribes surrendered. Settlers, who had imagined they were fighting an implacable foe numbering in the hundreds or thousands were shocked to discover that all that remained of the eastern tribes was 16 men, nine women and one child. They were removed to Flinders Island never to see their home again. Most died of disease. By 1830 the number of Tasmanians in the north-east was 74, with a further 70 or so women who had been taken as slaves by sealers. While greater north-western Tasmania had been home to more than a dozen tribes, by 1834 when Robinson contacted the final known remnants, these dozen tribes had been virtually exterminated. There are currently some 20,000 individuals who are of Tasmanian Aboriginal descent.

=== Victoria ===
Records in the early days in Port Phillip were sparse and unclear, and the level of resistance to the European settlers and other aspects of Aboriginal culture before this is a source of continuing investigation. It is estimated that massacres by white settlers resulted in the death of approximately 11% of the Aboriginal population between 1836 and 1851.

==== 1830s ====
- 1833–1834. Convincing Ground massacre of Gunditjmara: On the shore near Portland, Victoria was one of the largest recorded massacres in Victoria. Whalers and the local Kilcarer clan of the Gunditjmara people disputed rights to a beached whale carcass. Reports vary with from 60 to 200 Aboriginal Australians killed, including women and children. An 1842 report on the incident notes that the Gunditjmara people believed that only two members of the Kilcarer clan survived.
- 1838. Up to 100 Aboriginal people were killed in reprisals carried out in response to the Faithfull Massacre, also known as the Battle of Broken River and according to historian Chris Clark "a battle which the Aborigines won". On 11 April, by the Broken River at Benalla, a party of some 18 men, employees of George and William Faithfull, were searching out new land to the south of Wangaratta for their livestock, when they were attacked by about 20 Indigenous Australians (possibly as a reprisal for the killing of several Aboriginal people at Ovens earlier by the same stockmen). At least one Koori and eight Europeans died. There were reports of reprisals at Wangaratta and at Murchison (led by the native police under Henry Dana and in the company of the young Edward Curr, who said that he took issue with the official reports). Other incidents were recorded at Mitchelton and Toolamba.
- 1838. The Mount Cottrell massacre of around 10 Wathaurong people was carried out in retaliation for the killing of squatter Charles Franks and his convict shepherd Thomas Flinders.
- 1838. The Waterloo Plains massacre of between 8 and 23 Dja Dja Wurrung people was a reprisal raid for the killing of two station hands and the theft of sheep.
- 1839. In about May–June of that year the Campaspe Plains massacre, Campaspe Creek, Central Victoria, killing Taungurung and Dja Dja Wurrung people. In May 1839, Taungurung killed two shepherds in reprisal for the murder of three Taungurung the previous month. An armed party of settlers led by station owner Charles Hutton killed up to 40 Taungurung at a campsite near Campaspe Creek. The following month, Hutton led an armed party of police who killed six Dja Dja Wurrung at another camp. All six had been shot in the back while fleeing. The Assistant Protector of Aborigines for the region, described the massacre as "a deliberately planned illegal reprisal."
- 1839. In about the middle of the year, the Murdering Gully massacre near Camperdown, Victoria was carried out by Frederick Taylor and others in retaliation for some sheep being killed on his station by two unidentified Aboriginal Australians. The Tarnbeere Gundidj clan of the Djargurd Wurrung people, around 35–40 people, was wiped out. Public censure led to Taylor's River being renamed Mount Emu Creek and, fearing prosecution for the massacre, in late 1839 or early 1840 Taylor fled to India. Of particular note for this massacre is the extent of oral history, first hand accounts of the incident, the detail in settler diaries, records of Wesleyan missionaries, and Aboriginal Protectorate records.
- 1 December 1839. The Blood Hole massacre at Middle Creek, 10–11 kilometres (6.2–6.8 mi) from Glengower Station between Clunes and Newstead, Victoria. Up to ten Aboriginal people were killed.

==== 1840s ====
- 1840–1850. The Gippsland massacres, many led by the Scots pastoralist Angus McMillan, saw between 300 and 1,000 Gunai (or Kurnai) people murdered.
- 1840–1860. The Eumeralla Wars between European settlers and Gunditjmara people in south west Victoria included a number of massacres resulting in over 442 Aboriginal deaths.
- 1840. On 8 March. Known as the Fighting Hills massacre, the Whyte brothers massacred, according to various estimates, from 20 to 51 Jardwadjali men, women, and children on the Konongwootong run near Hamilton, Victoria. Aboriginal tradition puts the death toll as high as 80.
- 1840. The Fighting Waterholes massacre was the second massacre by the Whyte brothers, coming only months after the Fighting Hills Massacre. Over 40 Konongwootong Gunditj Aboriginal people killed near Konongwootong Reservoir (then Denhills Creek). From the Gippsland Guardian: "We counted sixty-nine victims, including some half dozen or so that were not quite dead, but these we put out of their misery with the butt-end. The blacks carried off a few wounded ones but as we fired at the body we pretty well spoilt them all as we hit".
- 1842. The Lubra Creek massacre of five Dhauwurd wurrung people took place on the Caramut run, leased by Thomas Osbrey and Sidney Smith at the time.
- 1843. The Warrigal Creek massacre, which left 100–150 Aboriginal people dead.
- 1846. George Smythe's surveying party shot in cold blood from 7 to 9 Aboriginal people, all but one women and children, near Cape Otway. Known as the Blanket Bay massacre

=== Western Australia ===
==== 1830s ====
- 1830. Fremantle: The first official "punishment raid" on Aboriginal people in Western Australia, led by Captain Irwin, took place in May 1830. A detachment of soldiers led by Irwin attacked an Aboriginal encampment north of Fremantle in the belief that it contained men who had "broken into and plundered the house of a man called Paton" and killed some poultry. Paton had called together a number of settlers who, armed with muskets, set out after the Aboriginal people and came upon them not far from the home. "The tall savage who appeared the chief showed unequivocal gestures of defiance and contempt" and was accordingly shot. Irwin stated, "This daring and hostile conduct of the natives induced me to seize the opportunity to make them sensible to our superiority, by showing how severely we could retaliate their aggression." In actions that followed over the next few days, more Aboriginal people were killed and wounded.
- 1834. Pinjarra: Conflict with the Murray tribe – official records state that 14 Aboriginal people were killed, but other accounts put the figure much higher, at 25 or more.
- 1836. August, Henry William St Pierre Bunbury after killings in the York area, tracked one wounded Aboriginal man into the bush and shot him through the head. Bunbury also recorded the names of another 11 Aboriginal men he killed during this period. Settlers to the district collected ears of Aboriginal men slain.

==== 1840s ====
- 1841. On 27 February, an extensive massacre at Lake Minninup in Western Australia, led by Captain John Molloy who "gave special instructions that no woman or child should be killed, but that no mercy should be offered the men. A strong and final lesson must be taught the blacks. ... Native after native was shot, and the survivors, knowing that orders had been given not to shoot the women, crouched on their knees, covered their bodies with their bokas, and cried, "Me yokah" (woman). The white men had no mercy. The black men were killed by dozens, and their corpses lined the route of march of the avengers." Also known as the Wonnerup massacre.

==== 1850s ====
- 5 June 1854. The commanding officer of the Western Australian native police, John Nicol Drummond, together with a large group of station hands from nearby property holdings conducted a massacre of the Aboriginal people from the Greenough area, with Drummond and his force attacking their refuge at Bootenal swamp, The Naaguja word for this traditional campsite is Wula Bulangu, which translates to Pelican Spring. Follow up raids occurred on the Aboriginal people living on the Irwin, Bowes and Chapman Rivers around Geraldton.

==== 1860s ====
- 1865. The La Grange expedition was a search expedition carried out in the vicinity of La Grange Bay in the Kimberley region of Western Australia led by Maitland Brown that led to the death of up to 20 Aboriginal people. The expedition has been celebrated with the Explorers' Monument in Fremantle, Western Australia.
- 1867. The Battle of Minderoo at Minderoo Station, led by Farquhar MacRae and E. T. Hooley.
- 1868. Flying Foam Massacre, Dampier Archipelago. Following the killing of two police and two settlers by local Yaburara people, two parties of settlers from the Roebourne area, led by prominent pastoralists Alexander McRae and John Withnell, killed an unknown number of Yaburara. Estimates of the number of dead range from 20 to 150.

==== 1870s ====
- 1872. Governor Frederick Weld dismissed Perth Police magistrate E. W. Landor for failing to charge Geraldton drover Mr. Lockier Burges (1841–1929) with murder although he admitted shooting a "wild native" in cold blood. Mr Burges was convicted of the lesser charge of unlawful harm instead. The dismissal was appealed to the Home Office in London.

==== 1880s ====
- 1887. Halls Creek. Mary Durack suggests there was a conspiracy of silence about the massacres of Djara, Konejandi and Walmadjari peoples, and about attacks on Aboriginal people by white gold-miners, Aboriginal reprisals and consequent massacres at this time. John Durack was speared, which led to a local massacre in the Kimberley.

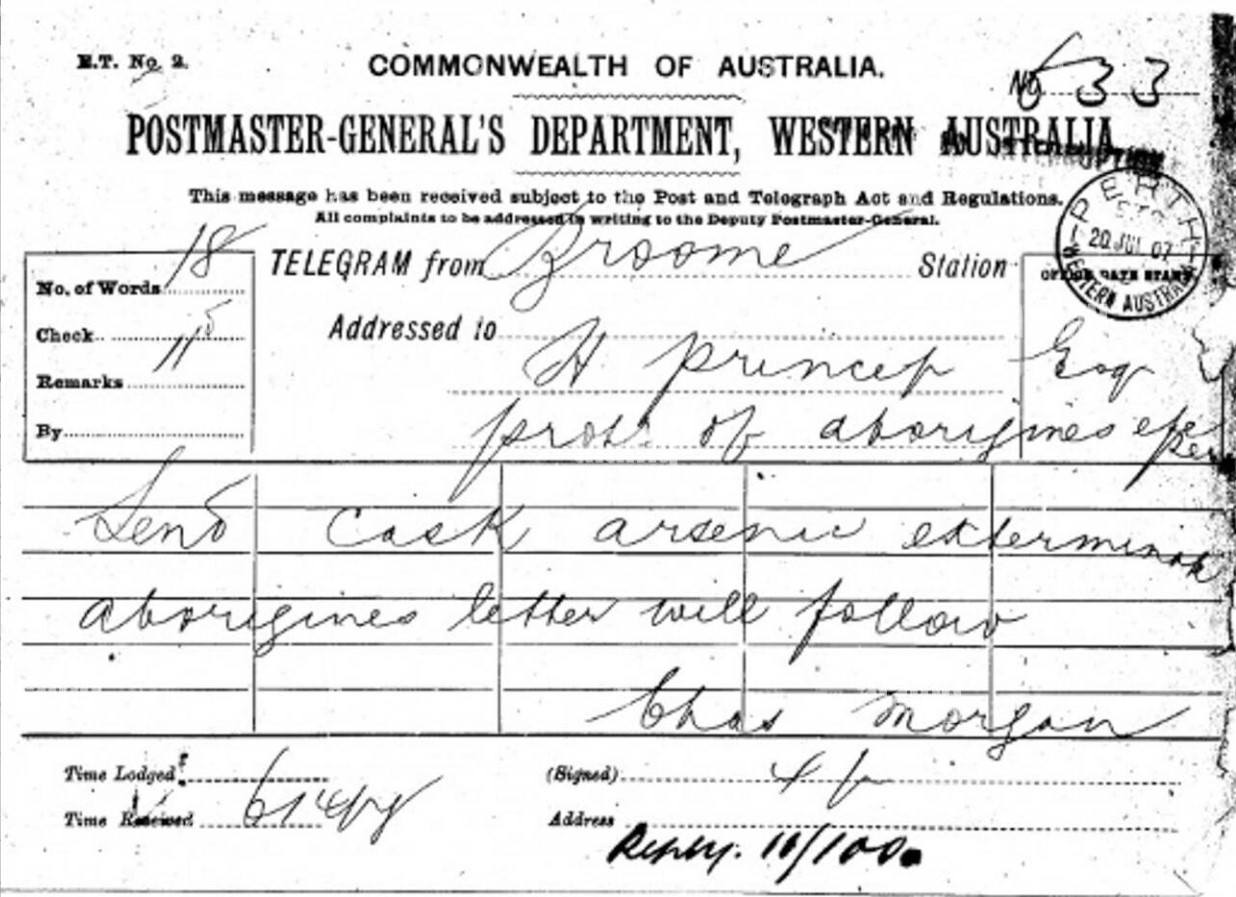
Telegram sent from Broome, Western Australia, 20 July 1907; recorded by Postmaster-General's office

- 1888. When a prospector named George Barnett from the Panton River was killed by a small group of Aboriginal people, a punitive party set out to "disperse the blacks". During the three week expedition, the group had "dispersed" over 600 men, women and children, with a newspaper reporting "only six niggers butchered". They also brought back two small Aboriginal boys with them as "trophies". One of the punitive expedition's leaders, Augustus Lucanus, remembers dispersing around 200 Aboriginal people in this incident while Mary Durack wrote that it was one of the most sweeping massacres in the region's history with one participant alone killing 35 Aboriginal people. The Government Resident of Roebourne stated that 70 were killed.

==== 1890s ====
- 1890–1926. Kimberley region—The Killing Times—East Kimberleys: During what the colonial government called "pacification", recalled as "The Killing Times", a quarter of Western Australia's police force was deployed in the Kimberley where only 1% of the white population dwelt. Violent means were used to drive off the Aboriginal tribes, who were hounded by police and pastoralists alike without judicial protection. The Indigenous peoples reacted with payback killings. Possibly hundreds were killed in the Derby, Fitzroy Crossing and Margaret River area, while Jandamarra was being hunted down. Reprisals, and the "villainous effects" of settler policy left the Kimberley Aboriginal people decimated. Massacres in retaliation for attacks on livestock are recorded as late as 1926. The Gija people alone recall ten mass killings for this period.
- 1893. Behn River. After an affray in which 23 Aboriginal people were shot and a policeman speared, a punitive expedition was launched in which another 30 Aboriginal people were shot to "teach them a lesson" and instill fear of the white man into the Indigenous population as a whole.
- 11 November 1895. Ivanhoe Station. A group of police and trackers followed a group of Aboriginal people to a camp-site after they were alleged to have stolen cattle. About 20 Aboriginal people were shot and killed after they tried to flee. One of the participants in this massacre, Constable Mick Rhatigan, was later implicated in the 1915 Mistake Creek massacre.

=== South Australia ===
==== 1840s ====
- 1842. Pillaworta Station, end of Arno Bay, Eyre Peninsula – unknown number of Aboriginal people killed by soldiers in retribution for the killings of colonists in the Port Lincoln district earlier in 1842.
- 1848. Avenue Range Station massacre (near Guichen Bay on the state's Limestone Coast) – at least 9 indigenous Buandig Wattatonga clan people allegedly murdered by the station owner James Brown who was subsequently charged with the crime. The case was dropped by the Crown for lack of (European) witnesses. Christina Smith's source from the Wattatonga tribe refers to 11 people killed in this incident by two white men.
- 1849. Waterloo Bay massacre (Elliston on the west coast of Eyre Peninsula) – tens of Aboriginal Nauo people were killed in retribution for the killing of two settlers and theft of food.

==== 1850s ====
- 1852. Massacre at Brachina Gorge by a party of men led by Johnson Frederick Hayward, who ran Aroona Station, a sheep station in the Flinders Ranges – at least 15 Adnyamathanha people killed in a dawn attack on 17 March 1852, in retaliation for the murder of stockman Robert Richardson on 14 March.
- 1852. Uro Bluff Massacre, a reprisal killing for the murder of a shepherd, James Brown, near Mount Arden in the Flinders Ranges near Quorn, on 19 September 1852. The eight men said to be involved in the killings reported to the Protector of Aborigines, Matthew Moorhouse, afterwards that four men had been killed on 23 September, but an Aboriginal man named Melaia told a different version of the events, another witness called Staniford named a lot more than eight men, and later reports and oral histories suggest that the number of Aboriginal deaths was greater. The men named by Staniford were never questioned, and Moorhouse recommended more police protection in the district in his report.

==== 1880s ====
- Koonchera Point massacre, near Lake Howitt in the far north of the state, just off the Birdsville Track. Hundreds of Ngameni, Yawarrawarrka, Yandruwandha, and Bugadji people were meeting for a corroboree when police and their Aboriginal trackers arrived in response to the killing and eating of a bullock by Aboriginal people. No warning was given and the police and trackers opened fire, killing between 200 and 500 people, with only five survivors.

=== Queensland ===
==== 1840s ====
- 1842. 30–60 or more killed in the Kilcoy poisoning. On the outskirts of Kilcoy Station owned by Sir Evan MacKenzie, 30–60 people of the Kabi Kabi died from eating flour laced with strychnine and arsenic. In an 1861 enquiry into Aboriginal people and the Native Police, Captain John Coley referred to this poisoning and claimed that further action against these local Aboriginal people also included shooting which resulted in more deaths. He also confirmed that "strychnine goes by the name of Mackenzie among the blacks". Evan MacKenzie received only a caution from John Plunkett, the Attorney-General of New South Wales, for this well reported massacre. The Battle of One Tree Hill, in which Multuggerah and his band of warriors prevailed, followed the poisoning.
- 1847. 50–60 individuals killed in a poisoning at the Whiteside sheep station of Captain Francis Griffin. In April 1847 flour laced with arsenic was left in a hut with the expectation that Aboriginal people "would visit the hut and make use of the mixture"; the act was reportedly in revenge for an Aboriginal attack on a hutkeeper, who had been blinded by a blow to the head with a waddy. Some twenty years later a white pioneer "saw scores of bleached bones including a complete skeleton" while riding in the vicinity, and heard that "fifty or sixty" Aboriginal people had lost their lives there by poisoning.
- 26 November 1848. 3 Aboriginal women and one child were murdered at Canning Creek by a posse of seven white men.
- 1849. Perhaps more than 100 killed in the Upper Burnett. The murder of the Pegg brothers, two adolescent employees at Foster and Blaxland Gin Gin station in June, was avenged in a large-scale punitive expedition with 'over 50 station-hands and squatters' catching up with 'more than a 100 myals' camped at the mouth of Burnett River allegedly on the ground of the later 'Cedar' sugar plantation or Gibson's Cedars Estate. No numbers were made but the 'affray' was later described as 'one of the bloodiest in Queensland frontier history'.
- 1849. Unknown numbers killed on the Balonne and Condamine. By 1849 clashes between Aboriginal people and settlers occurred on the Balonne and Condamine Rivers of Queensland.

==== 1850s ====
- 1850s. Several reprisal killings and at least one massacre (on the Nerang River in 1857) of the Yugambeh people.
- 1850. Hundreds killed near Paddy Island in the Burnett River. A large-scale punitive expedition was formed following the murder of Gregory Blaxland junior at Gin Gin station in August of that year – by settlers from Walla, Tenningering, Yenda, Wetheron, Monduran, Kolonne, Eureka, Ideraway, Baramba, Boonara and Boubyjan stations. Both William Henry Walsh and Sir Maurice Charles O'Connell are known to have participated in this expedition and Walsh later revealed some details during a parliamentary debate in Queensland some two decades later. They caught up with a large party of Aboriginal people near Paddy's Island at the mouth of the Burnett River and a major assault took place resulting in "hundreds" of Aboriginal people being shot down. The number 200 has been mentioned, as has 2,000.
- January 1856. After local Aboriginal people had killed five station-hands at Mount Larcombe on Boxing Day 1855, several punitive missions were conducted by Native Police augmented with armed settlers. Lieutenant John Murray of the Native Police led these reprisals. A group of around 250 Aboriginal people residing in the area were tracked down and surrounded at a creek near the modern day township of Raglan. At dawn, just as the group of men, women and children were awakening, they were ambushed and many shot dead. Hourigan's Creek at Raglan is named after the trooper who fired the first shots. Those who survived were again hunted down to the coast at Keppel Bay and either shot or driven into the sea. A third group of Aboriginal people crossed the Fitzroy river with Murray in pursuit. To cross the river, the troopers borrowed a boat belonging to Charles Archer of Gracemere. A group of Aboriginal people encamped near Gracemere provided Murray with information about the fugitives, and from this group a number of men (described as "fighting men") then accompanied him, and assisted in tracking the fugitives and participated in the ensuing attack, during which a further fourteen Aboriginal people were indiscriminately killed. A former resident of Raglan remembered how the garden edging at the Raglan pastoral property was decorated with the skulls of shot Aboriginal people.
- 1857–1858. Hundreds killed (including Juandah (Wandoan) massacre) in retaliation for the Hornet Bank massacre. Massacre of the Yeeman tribe and numerous attacks on many others following the attack on the Fraser family and their employees at Hornet Bank station. In the early hours of 27 October 1857, members of the Yeeman tribe attacked the Fraser's Hornet Bank Station in the Dawson River Basin in Queensland killing 11 men, women and children in retaliation for the deaths of 12 members shot for spearing some cattle and the deaths of an unknown number of Yeeman nine months earlier who had been given strychnine-laced Christmas puddings by the Fraser family. Following the deaths of his parents and siblings, William Fraser, who had been away on business, began a campaign of extermination that eventually saw the extinction of the Yeeman tribe and language group. Fraser is credited with killing more than 100 members of the tribe with many more killed by sympathetic squatters and policemen. By March 1858 up to 300 Yeeman had been killed. Public and police sympathy for Fraser was high, and he gained a reputation as a folk hero throughout Queensland.

==== 1860s ====
- Early 1860s. "Water view", North Bundaberg, at least 15 to 20 Aboriginal Australians killed in a dispersal by Native Police. The co-founder and proprietor of Colanne Station (Kolan) Nicholas Edward Nelson Tooth (1843–1913) in 1895 wrote about finding of numerous remains from Native Police dispersal: "Two or three of us were one day looking for ebony wood (for stockwhip handles) when we suddenly came on a heap of human bones, among which were 15 or 20 skulls ... At first we thought it was an old burying place of the blacks, but I afterwards learnt from a black that it was the spot where the native police had come upon a large camp of blacks and dispersed them."
- 7 March 1860. Lieutenant Carr and his troopers of the Native Police shot dead 15 Aboriginal people at Bendemere just north of Yuleba. Carr had tracked down and surrounded their camp containing around 100 people because the local squatter, William Sim, complained that they were "annoying the shepherds and demanding rations." Upon seeing the troopers they threw their nulla-nullas at them, to which Carr responded with sustained gunfire for over an hour.
- January 1861. In response to a letter from settler John Hardie, a native police detachment led by Lieutenant Frederick Wheeler was dispatched to Dugandan to "disperse" the local Aboriginal people. The native police ambushed their camp during the night, killing at least two men, possibly as many as 40.
- 10 February 1861. Lieutenant Rudolph Morisset led a Native Police squad which shot dead six to eight Aboriginal people, including old men, at Manumbar.
- October–November 1861. Central Highlands. Between October and November 1861, police and settlers killed an estimated 170 Aboriginal people in what was then known as the Medway Ranges following the killing of the Wills family. Native Police shooting into an Aboriginal camp at the Nogoa River on 26 October 1861, estimated they shot from 60 to 70 dead before running out of ammunition.
- January 1863. Fifteen members of an Aboriginal group resident to the area around Mount Elliot shot dead.
- 16 December 1864. Nassau River Massacre. A party of four armed Europeans and four Aboriginal employees, led by Frank and Alexander Jardine, massacred 8 or 9 members of the Kokoberrin people. The Jardine Brothers claimed to have been attacked by the Kokoberrin while droving approximately 250 cattle on the first attempt by British colonisers to take cattle up the west coast of Cape York Peninsula A first hand account from Frederick Byerley records that "...seeing eight or nine of their companions drop, made them think better of it, and they were finally hunted back across the river, leaving their friends behind them. The question here is, who was trespassing on whose land? Surely the Kokoberrin warriors were merely protecting their families and their traditional lands".
- July 1865. Native troopers ambushed a Darumbal ceremonial gathering outside Rockhampton and shot dead 18 Aboriginal Australians, and then set fire to their corpses.
- 1867. Goulbolba Hill Massacre, on John Arthur Macartney's St Helens Station Central Queensland: large massacre in 1866 or early 1867 involving men, women and children. This was claimed to be the result of settlers pushing Aboriginal people out of their hunting grounds and the Aboriginal people being forced to hunt livestock for food. A party of Native Police, allegedly under Frederick Wheeler, who had a reputation for violent repressions, was sent to "disperse" this group of Aboriginal people, who were "resisting the invasion". He is supposed to have also mustered up a force of 100 local whites. Alerted to Wheeler's presence by a native stockman, the district's Aboriginal people hid in caves on Goulbolba Hill. According to eyewitness testimony taken down from one local white in 1899 (thirty years after the event), that day some 300 Aboriginal people, including all the women and children, were shot dead or killed by being herded into the nearby lake for drowning. Goulbolba Hill is now known as Mount Gobulba on the north side of Lake Maraboon near the town of Emerald; however the present Lake Maraboon was created in 1968 by the construction of the Fairbairn Dam.
- April 1867. The Leap Massacre at Mt Mandarana, near Mackay. The massacre of large group of 200 Aboriginal men, women and children from the north side of the Pioneer River, took place after being pursued by a Queensland Native Police Force, led by Sub-Inspector Johnstone, in April 1867. The group was camping on Balnagowan pastoral lease (just to the south of The Leap), where cattle had been speared in February 1867 and had sought refuge in caves at the top of the mountain. They were forced to jump off a cliff on Mount Mandarana of several hundred feet, rather than be face the carbines of the Native Police Force.
- 12 July 1867. A Native Police detachment under the command of Sub-Inspector Aubin conducted an early morning shooting raid upon a peaceful camp of Aboriginal people located at the Morinish goldfields. Seven people were killed, including children and an old man, with others severely wounded. Although Sub-Inspector Aubin was forced to resign, he faced no public inquiry or any further legal action.
- 1869. Kaurareg killings on Torres Strait Islands. District police magistrate in Somerset, Far North Queensland, Henry Chester, and his successor, Frank Jardine, send native police out to punish Kaurareg people on Muralag (Prince of Wales Island), who were wrongly thought to have killed the crew of a schooner called Sperwer. A massacre is reported to have taken place, and reprisals against the Kaurareg continued.

==== 1870s ====
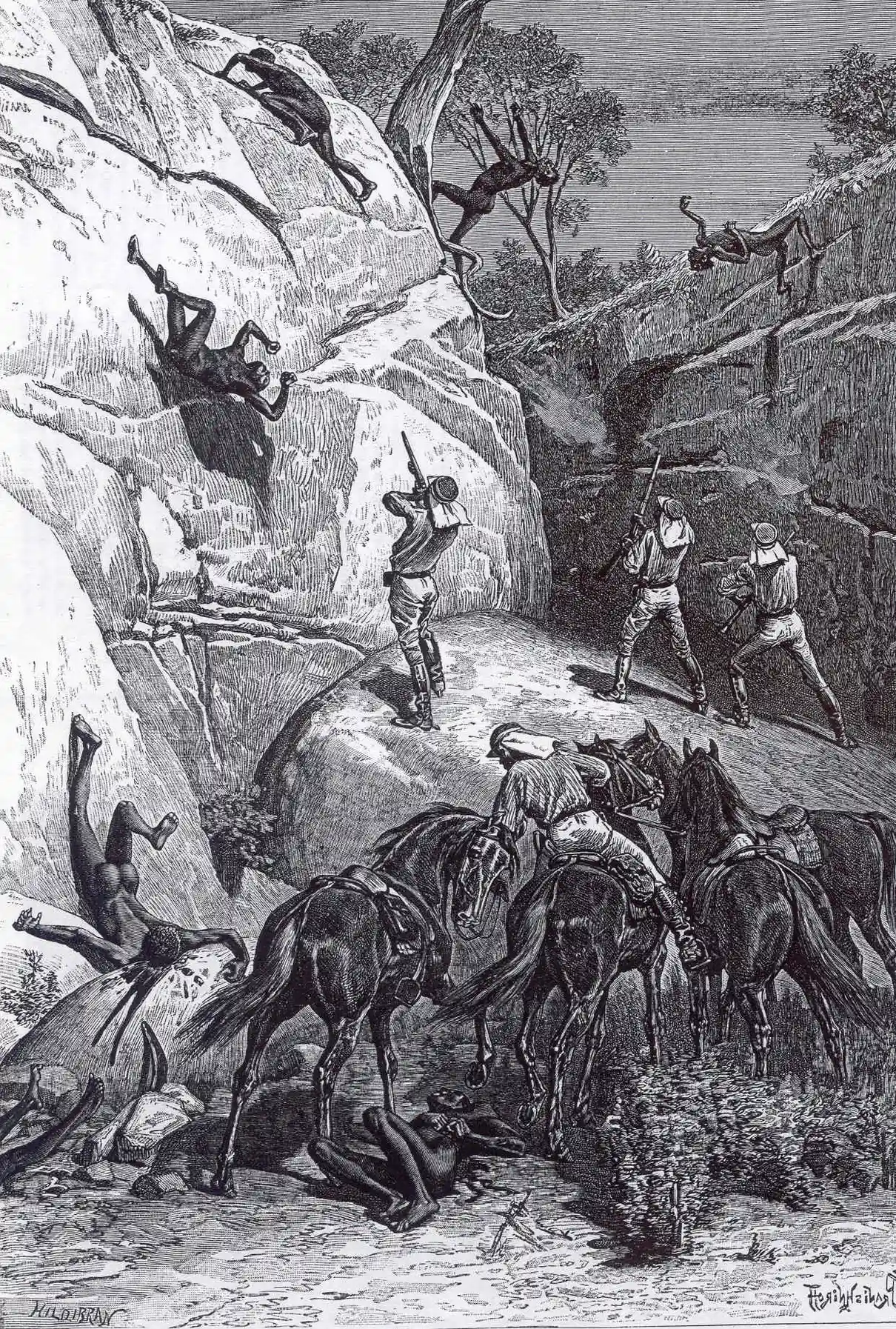
Skull Hole massacre, Mistake Creek, perpetrated by Queensland's native police in 1872. Drawing by Carl Lumholtz

- c. 1872. Bladensburg massacre. Over 200 killed by Native Police at Skull Hole on the head of Mistake Creek, (Note: Not to be confused with the Mistake Creek massacre in Western Australia, or the 1890 massacre in the Northern Territory.) Bladensburg Station (near Winton) Central Queensland. In 1888, the visiting Norwegian scientist Carl Lumholtz recalled how, at Bladensburg in about 1882–84, he "was shown" "a large number of skulls of natives who had been shot by the black police" some years earlier. In 1901, P. H. F Mackay wrote an article to The Queenslander citing one witness and participant in this dispersal—the later property manager Hazelton Brock—who classified the incident as "the Massacre of the Blacks" and stated that it took place at the Skull Hole on Mistake Creek. Thus two unrelated sources give evidence and details (notably with reports of forensic evidence in both cases) of at least one large-scale dispersal at Bladensburg some time about 1877–1879. It was "one of the most blood curdling sights I ever saw", Hazelton Brock is supposed to have stated. Both sources describe it as connected to an Aboriginal attack on a bullock wagon during which one man was "murdered". The dispersal was headed by Acting Sub-inspector Robert Wilfred Moran (1846–1911) and his troopers and a group of settlers headed by George Fraser—14 men in all—and the target was a large camp with hundreds of blacks in the "Skull Hole" in "the Forsyth Ranges on the head of Mistake Creek". Hazelton Brock is cited for the statement that over 200 blacks were killed.
- 1872. Mogool, Mount Coliseum, Miriam Vale station, the Goreng Goreng tribe had killed a bullock and were feasting on it at base of Moogool, and the native troopers under Acting Sub-inspector Douglas were called in. The troopers rounded the tribe into a circle and massacred almost all of them; only Gimmie escaped with his young nephew Nyralung on his shoulders and ran to the mountain.
- 1873. The Battle Camp collision, Far North Queensland in about December 1873, supposedly took the life of a number of Aboriginal Australians. The event took place during the first rush of miners travelling from the Endeavour River to the Palmer river in about November or December 1873. In an article in the Queenslander's Sketcher in December 1875, one digger recalled the Palmer rush two years earlier. One morning he and his party had, he told: ...passed 'Battle camp' ... It was here the blacks of the interior first re-ceived their 'baptism of fire;' where they first became acquainted with the death-dealing properties of the mysterious weapon of the white man;...Here and there a skull, bleached to the whiteness of snow, with a round bullet-hole to show the cause of its present location...
- 1874–1875. Blackfellow's Creek, Far North Queensland. A letter from a miner dated "Upper Palmer River April 16, 1876" describes his camp at a place known locally as "Blackfellows creek". He explained, leaving very little doubt as to its appearance, that: "...To my enquiry as to why it was so named, the answer is that not long since 'the niggers got a dressing there'—whatever that may mean; possibly a bright coloured shirt apiece, for decency's sake. There have been, certainly, 'dressings' of another sort dealt out in this part of the country to the blacks,.... Be that as it may, however, the Golgotha (Note: Here referring to the meaning "place of a skull") on which we are at present camped would well repay a visit from any number of phrenological students in search of a skull, or of anatomical professors in want of a 'subject.'"
- 1878. "Dispersing the mob". A total of 75 dead or dying was counted after just one Native Police "dispersal", most likely somewhere in the Cook district in Far North Queensland. In the January 1879 issue of Brisbane Daily News, the highly acclaimed editor Carl Feilberg recorded the numbers of killed during a dispersal in the far north (most likely Cook district), saying "A gentleman, on whose words reliance can be placed, has stated that after one of these raids he has counted as many as seventy-five natives dead or dying upon the ground. Of course the official returns will report the aboriginal race to be fast dying out."
- 1879. Selwyn Range, North-West Queensland. It has been alleged that an estimated total of 300 Aboriginal Australians (supposedly of the Kalkadoon tribe) were shot in a series of Native Police and settler "dispersals" ending in the Selwyn Ranges. It has been described as alleged retaliation—supposedly on the Kalkadoon tribe, following the alleged "murder" of the squatter Bernard Molvo and his men James Kelly, "Harry" or Henry Butler and "Tommy" or Thomas Holmes—who were killed at Suleiman Creek (this event was called the 'Woonamo massacre' as the bodies of the victims were found in the 'Wonomo billabong' at Sulieman Creek). Luke Russell, the manager of Stanbook station, Alexander Kennedy and later Sub-inspector Ernest Eglinton and his troopers were allegedly involved in a series of retaliations culminating in the Selwyn Range. Robert Clarke, 22 years after the alleged events, estimated (in 1901) that a total of 300 were shot.
- 1879. 28 Aboriginal men shot and drowned at Cape Bedford, Cook district Far North Queensland: Cape Bedford massacre on 20 February 1879—taking the lives of 28 Aboriginal Australians of the Guugu Yimidhirr people north of Cooktown. Cooktown-based Native Police Sub-inspector Stanhope O'Connor with his troopers Barney, Jack, Corporal Hero, Johnny and Jimmy hunted down and subsequently "hemmed in" a group of Guugu-Yimidhirr Aboriginal Australians in "a narrow gorge", north of Cooktown, "of which both outlets were secured by the troopers. There were twenty-eight men and thirteen gins thus enclosed, of whom none of the former escaped. Twenty-four were shot down on the beach, and four swam out to the sea" never to be seen again.

==== 1880s ====
- 1882. There were retributive attacks against mainland Cape York coastal Aboriginal people (mostly Guugu Yimithirr) after it was wrongly assumed that Mary Watson (who became a folk hero to Queenslanders) had been murdered after an attack on Lizard Island, in which one of her Chinese servants was killed. It was later found that she, her son, and another servant had escaped the island but later died of thirst on an island near Howick Island. Mounted police and native troopers from Cooktown under Hervey Fitzgerald (who had just recently reinstated after disciplinary action for whipping an Aboriginal woman, and promoted to Inspector) shot a number of coastal Cape York people from three mainland groups in retaliation. The number of victims went unrecorded, but it has since been estimated as up to 150 innocent victims. Police trashed Aboriginal camps and managed to elicit several false confessions to her murder. The killings devastated Aboriginal communities and their traditional economies in the region.
- 1884. 21st-century allegations regarding Battle Mountain: That more than 200 Kalkadoon people were killed near Kajabbi, near Cloncurry after a Chinese shepherd had been "murdered." Over 9 weeks, settlers and Urquhart's Native Mounted Police tracked the Kalkadoons. At Battle Mountain an estimated 600 Kalkatungu warriors gathered on a rocky outlook. Note this allegation has been made without any newspaper reports of the time confirming this.
- 1884. Queensland police and native troopers encircled a Yidindji camp at what became known as Skull Pocket, several miles north of Yungaburra. At dawn, a shot was fired from one side into the camp to make the Yidindji scatter, and then as they rushed into the ambushing forces elsewhere, they were shot down.
- September 1884. Following the fatal spearing of Sub-inspector Henry Pollock Kaye of the Native Mounted Police on the Woolgar gold fields when driving out some 40 indigenous persons from the town, it is indicated a retaliatory massacre occurred.
- 1884–1885. The Coppermine massacres in the hinterland of Darwin, around the Daly River.
- 1887. White miners and native police killed the Ngadjon rainforest people in Boonjie. Douglas Grant was the only known survivor of this massacre, which was a response to the murder of reprisal for the killing of Frank Paaske, a Swedish gold panner.The site was later named and is still known as Butchers Creek.
- 1888. Diamantina River district in south west Queensland. A killing of a station cook near Durrie on the Diamantina in 1888 led to a reported attack by a party of the Queensland Native Police led by sub-inspector Robert Little. The attack was timed to coincide with an assembly of young Aboriginal Australians around the permanent waters of Kaliduwarry. Great gatherings of Aboriginal youth were held at Kaliduwarry on the Eyre Creek on a regular basis and attracted youths from as far away as the Gulf of Carpentaria to below the Flinders Ranges in South Australia. Perhaps as many as two hundred Aboriginal Australians might have been killed on this occasion.

=== Northern Territory ===
==== 1820s ====
(then part of New South Wales)

- 29 December 1827. Captain Henry Smyth of the 39th Regiment of the British Army, Commandant of the British military outpost at Fort Wellington on the Cobourg Peninsula ordered a punitive mission against the local Iwaidja. A party of three armed convicts and three soldiers conducted an early morning raid on the native camp near to a beach on the Bowen's Straits. Many were wounded and at least five Aboriginal people were killed, including a child and her mother, who was bayoneted as she was fleeing to the beach. Smyth had previously utilised one of the three 18-pound carronades mounted at Fort Wellington against the Iwaidja on 30 July. The reports of casualties from this cannon attack range from zero to thirty dead. The use of cannon against Aboriginal people by the British in this area was not new as Phillip Parker King had fired a 6-pound carronade mounted to his survey ship, the Mermaid, against the local people of the nearby Goulburn Islands on 30 March 1819.

==== 1870s ====
(then part of South Australia)

- 1874. Barrow Creek. In February Mounted Constable Samuel Gason arrived at Barrow Creek and a telegraph station was established. Eight days later a group of Kaytetye men attacked the station, killing two whites, Stapleton and Franks, while some others were injured. The motivation for the assault is unclear, various reasons suggest either failure to provide sufficient goods in exchange for the occupation of territory, retaliation for treatment of Kaytetye women, the closing off of their only water source, or, according to a later memory, revenge for setting up the station on one of the most sacred Kaytetye sites. According to T. G. H. Strehlow's information, obtained from elders, the tribe couldn't take out revenge on white criminals who had abducted and raped their women, and so decided to punish the only whites in their vicinity.

Samuel Gason mounted a large police hunt against the Kaytetye, with patrols out scouring the land for 6 weeks. 'Skipper' Partridge recalled in 1918 that the patrols shot every black they laid eyes on. The official report stated 10 Kaytetye had been killed by the punitive expedition. Other estimates go up to 40 or more. Skull Creek, where the massacre took place, 50 miles south of Barrow Creek, takes its name from the bleached bones found there long after, the remains of a camp of Aboriginal Australians shot by one of the patrols, though, according to an old settler, Alex Ross, "They were just blacks sitting in their camp, and the party was looking around for blacks to shoot."

- 1875. Corporal George Montagu led a punitive expedition resulting in up to 150 Aboriginal people being shot dead around the Roper River.
- 1878. Constable William George Stretton led a punitive expedition resulting in at least 17 Aboriginal people being shot dead near the Daly River.

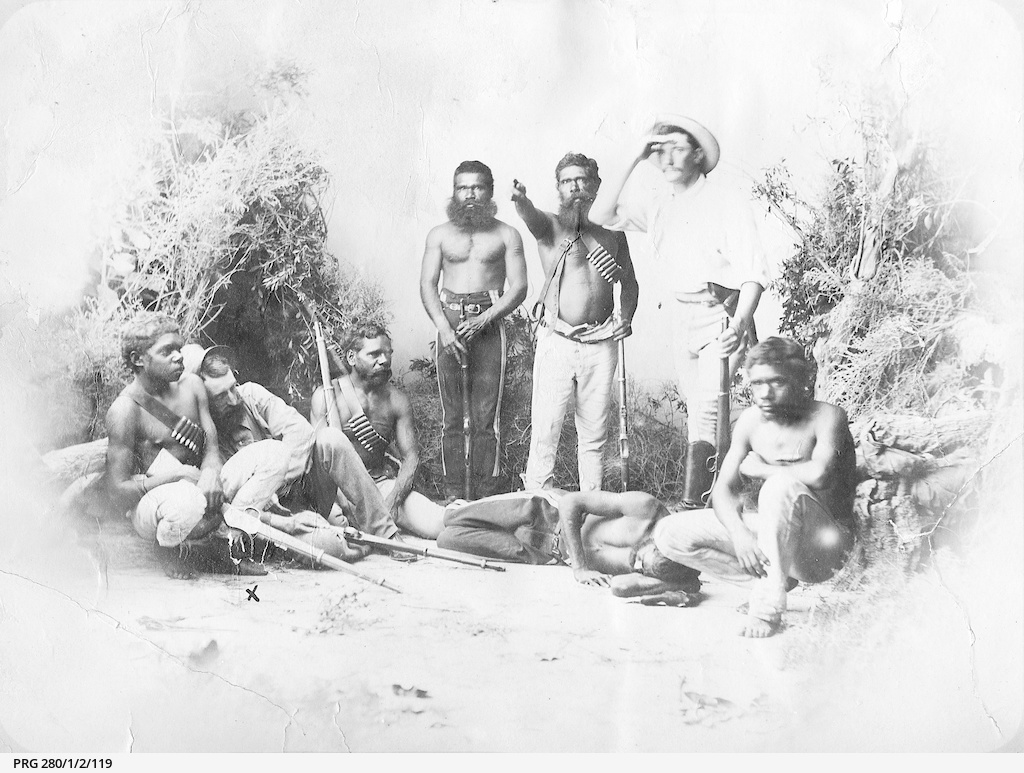
Constable William Willshire (standing) and Constable Erwein Wurmbrand (resting) with their Native Police troopers

==== 1880s ====
- 1882. Constable Augustus Lucanus and Corporal George Montagu led a punitive expedition where a number of Aboriginal people were shot dead.
- 1884. In August Constable William Willshire led a punitive expedition resulting in around 50 Aboriginal people being shot dead.

In September, Constable William Willshire shot dead at least 3 Aboriginal people, and ex-Constable Augustus Lucanus led a punitive expedition which "dispersed" two large "mobs" of Aboriginal people.

In October, Corporal George Montagu led a punitive expedition resulting in around 150 Aboriginal people being shot dead, and Constable Allan MacDonald shot dead 14 Aboriginal people.

In November, Constable Erwein Wurmbrand shot dead 7 Aboriginal people.

- 1885. In June, Constable Erwein Wurmbrand led a punitive expedition which resulted in at least 17 Aboriginal people being shot dead and in October, Constable Cornelius Power shot dead at least four Aboriginal people.
- 1886. Constable William Curtis led a punitive expedition which resulted in 52 Aboriginal people being shot dead and another 12 falling to their deaths.
- 1880s–1890s. Arnhem Land. Series of skirmishes and "wars" between Yolngu and whites. Several massacres at Florida Station. Richard Trudgen also writes of several massacres in this area, including an incident where Yolngu were fed poisoned horse meat after they killed and ate some cattle (under their law, it was their land and they had an inalienable right to eat animals on their land). Many people died as a result of that incident. Trudgen also talks of a massacre ten years later after some Yolngu took a small amount of barbed wire from a huge roll to build fishing spears. Men, women and children were chased by mounted police and men from the Eastern and African Cold Storage Supply Company and shot.

==== 1890s ====
- 1890. Mistake Creek massacre: (Note: Not to be confused with the massacre near Bladensburg Station in Queensland in 1872, or the 1915 massacre in Western Australia.) Sixty Aboriginal men were being taken to Wyndham jail under police guard, on suspicion of cattle theft. A message was received stating that the actual perpetrator had been found, and the police were ordered to release the detainees. However, instead they shot and killed all 60 of them and then burned their bodies.
- 1895. Stapleton Siding massacre: This massacre killed approximately 80 Kungarakany and Warray peoples through the use of poisoned rations.

== Massacres after federation (1901) ==
=== Western Australia ===
Kimberley region – The Killing Times – 1890–1920: The massacres listed below have been depicted in modern Australian Aboriginal art from the Warmun/Turkey Creek community who were members of the tribes affected. Oral histories of the massacres were passed down and artists such as Rover Thomas have depicted the massacres.

==== 1910s ====
- 1906–1907. Canning Stock Route: an unrecorded number of Aboriginal men and women were raped and massacred when Mardu people were captured and tortured to serve as "guides" and reveal the sources of water in the area after being run down by men on horseback, restrained by heavy chains 24 hours a day, and tied to trees at night. In retaliation for this treatment, plus the party's interference with traditional wells and the theft of cultural artefacts, Aboriginal people destroyed some of Canning's wells, and stole from and occasionally killed white travellers. A Royal Commission in 1908, exonerated Canning, after an appearance by Kimberley Explorer and Lord Mayor of Perth, Alexander Forrest claimed that all explorers had acted in such a fashion.
- 1911. Sergeant Richard Henry Pilmer of the Western Australia Police Force led a punitive expedition along the Canning Stock Route after three drovers were killed near Well 37. Pilmer's party, labelled as a "nigger hunting expedition" in the local press, shot dead at least 10 Aboriginal people at Wells 31, 35 and 46.
- 1915. Mistake Creek massacre: (Note: Not to be confused with the massacre near Bladensburg Station in Queensland in 1872, or the 1890 massacre in the Northern Territory.) In March 1915, telegraph linesman at Turkey Creek, Michael Rhatigan, together with his two Aboriginal employees, Joe Wynne and Nipper, shot dead a number of Gija people at Mistake Creek in the East Kimberley. Rhatigan and Nipper were arrested and Wynne was shot dead by police. Rhatigan was acquitted of any wrongdoing, while Nipper was ordered to face trial for murder, but found not guilty and was released.

==== 1920s ====
- 1922. Sturt Creek massacre: of more than a dozen people occurred in October 1922 when policemen were sent out to investigate the murders of two white stockmen, Joseph Condren and Tim O'Sullivan, at Billiluna Station. For many years the only record of the massacre was the oral histories of local Aboriginal elders who described the police shooting a group of Aboriginal people near Sturt Creek, but forensic evidence has confirmed the deaths.
- 1924. Bedford Downs massacre: a group of Gija and Worla men were tried in Wyndham for spearing a milking cow on the Bedford Downs Station. When released from the court they were given dog tags to wear and told to walk the 200 kilometres back to Bedford Downs. On arrival they were set to work to cut the wood that was later used to burn their bodies. Once the work was finished they were fed food laced with strychnine by white station hands and their writhing bodies were then either shot or they were clubbed to death. The bodies were subsequently burned by the local police. This massacre has been depicted in artworks by members of the Gija tribe, the identities of the alleged perpetrators passed down and the events re-enacted in a traditional corroboree that has been performed since the massacre allegedly occurred. The accounts became widely known after oral histories collected for the 1989 East Kimberley Impact Assessment Project (EKIAP) were published in 1999. As is customary for Indigenous reports, the EKIAP did not name anyone who was dead. Moran was unaware that several of the original written accounts did name not only the eyewitnesses and survivors but also the killers and other whites who were present but did not participate.
- June 1926. Forrest River massacre: Western Australian police constables, James Graham St Jack and Dennis Hastings Regan led a month long punitive expedition against Aboriginal people living in the Forrest River region. After the local mission station reported around 30 people missing, a police investigation was organised. This investigation found that at least 16 Aboriginal people were killed and their remains burnt in three purpose-built stone ovens. The police investigation led to a Royal Commission the following year. During the proceedings of this commission, the suggestion of the evidence of a native being equal to that of a white man was openly mocked. Despite this overt attempt to protect the perpetrators, the Commissioner still found that somewhere between 11 and 20 people were killed and St Jack and Regan were subsequently arrested for murder. Instead of going to trial, the men were brought before police magistrate Kidson who, in spite of the findings of the two previous investigations, deemed that the evidence was insufficient to go before a jury. Regan and St Jack were released and the Premier, Philip Collier, even re-instated them to their previous positions in the Kimberley.

=== Queensland ===
==== 1910s ====
- 1918. Bentinck Island: Part of the Wellesley Islands group, which includes Mornington Island, Bentinck Island was home to the Kaiadilt clan of just over 100 people. In 1911, a man by the name of McKenzie (other names unknown) was given a government lease for nearby Sweers Island that also covered the eastern portion of the much larger Bentinck Island. Arriving on Bentinck with an Aboriginal woman plus a flock of sheep, he built a hut near the Kurumbali estuary. Although the Kaiadilt avoided contact and refrained from approaching McKenzie's property he is alleged to have often explored the island, shooting any males he found while raping the women. In 1918, McKenzie organised a hunt with an unknown number of settlers from the mainland and, beginning from the northern tip of the island, herded the Indigenous inhabitants to the beach on its southern shore. The majority of the Kaiadilt fled into the sea where those that were not shot from the shore drowned. Those that tried to escape along the beach were hunted down and shot, with the exception of a small number who reached nearby mangroves where the settlers' horses could not follow. Several young women were raped on the beach, then held prisoner in McKenzie's hut for three days before being released. As the Kaiadilt remained isolated throughout much of the 20th century, the massacre remained unknown to the authorities until researchers recorded accounts given by survivors in the 1980s.

=== Northern Territory ===
==== 1910s ====
- 1911. Gan Gan massacre, when over 30 men, women and children were killed by colonial police and settlers; a fictionalised version is presented in Stephen Maxwell Johnson's 2020 film High Ground.
- 1918. Constable O'Connor led a punitive expedition which resulted in seven Aboriginal people being shot dead.

==== 1920s ====
- 1928. Coniston massacre: In August 1928, a Northern Territory Police constable, William George Murray, was ordered to investigate the killing of a white man named Fred Brooks by several Aboriginal people at a waterhole to the west of Coniston cattle station. Murray led a series of punitive expeditions from August until October 1928 which officially resulted in the deaths of 31 mostly Warlpiri and Kaytetye people. Other men who participated with Murray in the mass killings included local landholders William "Nugget" Morton and Randall Stafford; cattlemen John Saxby, William Briscoe and Alex Wilson; and three Aboriginal trackers who went by the names of Paddy, Dodger and Major. Analysis of the existing documentation and surviving Aboriginal testimonies indicate that somewhere between 100 and 200 people were shot dead during this police operation, a number far higher than the official bodycount. Murray later escorted two Aboriginal prisoners to Darwin to face trial for the killing of Fred Brooks. At this trial Murray freely gave evidence to the presiding judge that he shot a large number of Aboriginal people during the operation, that he shot to kill and shot dead wounded men and women. The judge noted that Murray "mowed them down wholesale." Murray's admissions in court led to widespread publicity about the massacres and a governmental Board of Enquiry was set up to investigate the incident. The Board of Enquiry was a whitewash set up to protect the colonial system in the Northern Territory and it found that the shootings were justified. No charges were laid against any of the perpetrators and Murray continued to serve in the Northern Territory Police until the 1940s. A survivor of the massacre, Billy Stockman Tjapaltjarri, later became part of the first generation of Papunya painting men. Billy Stockman was saved by his mother, who put him in a coolamon.

== See also ==
- Aboriginal deaths in custody
- Australian frontier wars
- Australian genocide debate
- Black War (Tasmania)
- Genocides in history in Australia
- Genocide of Indigenous Australians
- History of Indigenous Australians
- Mass poisonings of Aboriginal Australians
- Native Police
- Removal of Aboriginal people in Tasmania
