= Coutts Crossing, New South Wales =

Coutts Crossing
- Town
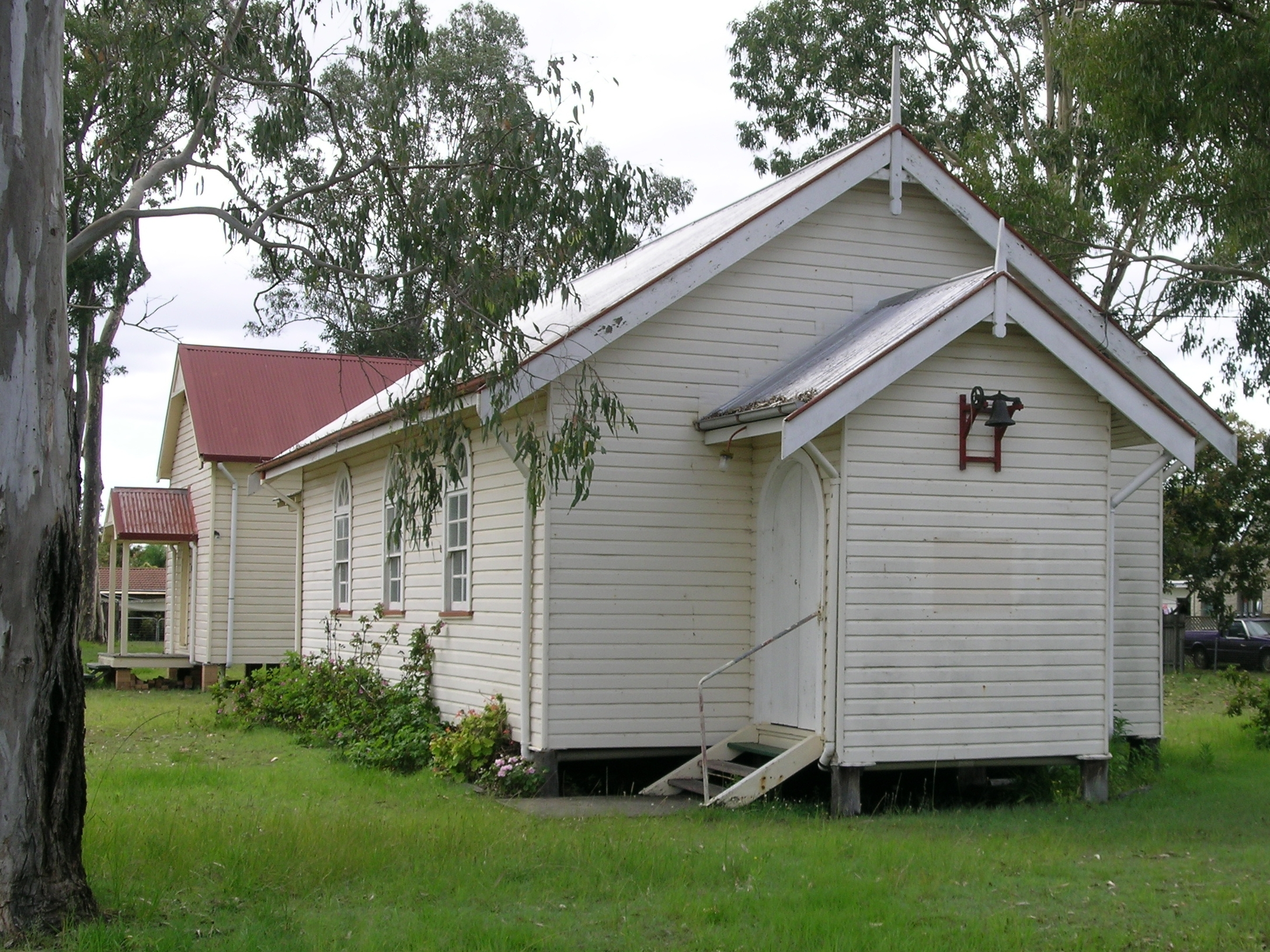
- A church at Coutts Crossing.

- Coordinates: 29°49′S 152°53′E
- Country: Australia
- State: New South Wales
- LGA(s): Clarence Valley
- Location: 18 km (11 mi) from Grafton

Government
  - State electorate(s): Clarence
  - Federal division(s): Page
- Elevation: 40 m (130 ft)

Population
  - Total(s): 1,053 (2021 census)
- Postcode: 2460

Coutts Crossing (population 1,053) is a rural village in the Clarence Valley Council of New South Wales, Australia. The village is about 18 kilometres south-west of Grafton on the banks of the Orara River along the Armidale–Grafton Road.

== History ==
The village is named after Thomas Coutts, a settler from Scotland who established the nearby Kangaroo Creek pastoral station in 1840. Coutts was accused of perpetrating a mass poisoning of Aboriginals on the Kangaroo Creek run. The poisoning occurred in late 1847 and resulted in the deaths of 23 people. Coutts was arrested and sent to Sydney for trial but the case was dismissed. He returned to the area and was able to continue acquiring pastoral properties further north.

British occupation in the immediate vicinity around Coutts Crossing began in 1840 with the arrival of pastoral squatter William Forster. He set up a sheep station in the area which he named Purgatory due to the high level of Aboriginal resistance he encountered while taking possession of the land. He later changed the name of the station to Geergarow, which is commemorated today in the name of the main road heading west from the township of Coutts Crossing.

== Facilities and services ==
The village itself was established as a service centre for the local farming community in the 1860s. However, today the village is a dormitory suburb with majority of residents commuting into Grafton. Despite this, the village boasts a tavern, general store, community hall and church.

In the last twenty-five years, a number of sporting and community services have been established, including tennis and squash courts as well as football and croquet grounds, a nine-hole golf course, a pre-school, a heritage centre and a combined New South Wales Rural Fire Service and State Emergency Service centre, established in 1997.

== School ==
Coutts Crossing Public School was established in 1913 and as of 2023 has 94 pupils enrolled.

== See also ==
- Clan Farquharson, the surname Coutts is a sept of this Scottish clan
