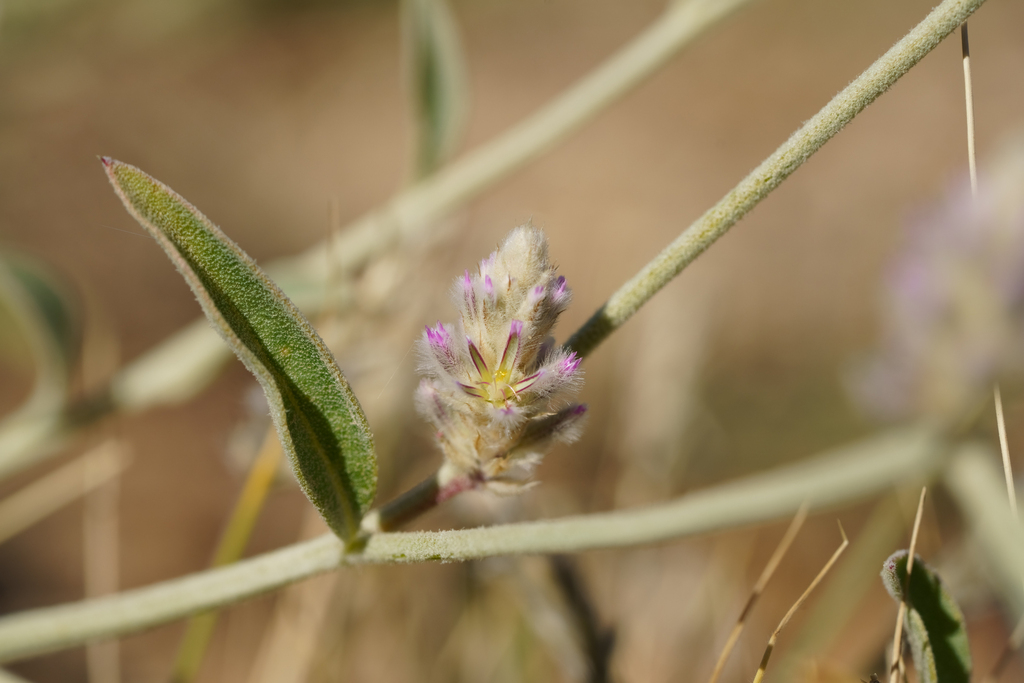

Scientific classification
- Kingdom: Plantae
- Clade: Tracheophytes
- Clade: Angiosperms
- Clade: Eudicots
- Order: Caryophyllales
- Family: Amaranthaceae
- Genus: Ptilotus
- Species: P. parviflorus

Binomial name
- Ptilotus parviflorus (Lindl.) F.Muell.

Synonyms
- Ptilotus obovatus var. lancifolius Benl; Ptilotus obovatus var. parviflorus (Lindl.) Benl; Trichinium parviflorum Lindl.; Trichinium subviride Domin; Trichinium virgatum A.Cunn. ex Moq.

= Ptilotus parviflorus =

Species of plant

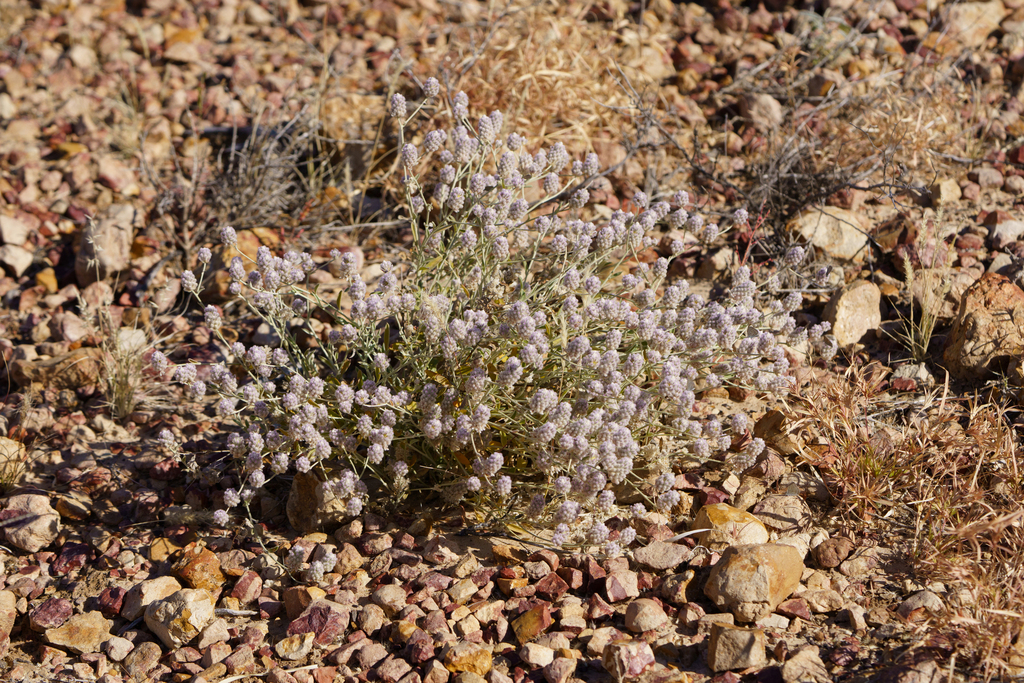
Habit in Bladensburg National Park

Ptilotus parviflorus is a sparsely branched, woody shrub of the family Amaranthaceae and is found in north-eastern Australia. It has densely hairy branchlets, narrowly elliptic to spoon-shaped leaves and spikes of grey flowers with a pink tip.

== Description ==
Ptilotus parviflorus is a sparsely branched, woody shrub that typically grows to a height of 30–50 cm (12–20 in), its branchlets densely covered with whorled hairs. The leaves are arranged alternately, more or less sessile, narrowly elliptic to spoon-shaped, 23–57 mm (0.91–2.24 in) long, 5.3–15 mm (0.21–0.59 in) wide, pale green, smooth and hairy. The flowers are borne in oval to cylindrical spikes on the ends of branchlets, 12–37 mm (0.47–1.46 in) long with many flowers on a rachis 10–35 mm (0.39–1.38 in) long. There are broadly egg-shaped, translucent, boat-shaped bracts 2.6–3.5 mm (0.10–0.14 in) long and similar bracteoles 2.5–3.7 mm (0.098–0.146 in) long at the base of the flowers. The perianth is 5.6–7 mm (0.22–0.28 in) long and grey with a pink tip, the two outer tepals 4.9–6.8 mm (0.19–0.27 in) long and the three inner tepals 4.0–6.3 mm (0.16–0.25 in) long. There are three fertile stamens and two staminodes, the ovary is glabrous and the style is conspicuously eccentric, 2.5–2.8 mm (0.098–0.110 in) long and glabrous.

== Taxonomy ==
This species was first formally described in 1882 by English botanist John Lindley, who gave it the name Trichinium parviflorum in Thomas Mitchell's Three Expeditions into the interior of Eastern Australia. In 1868, Ferdinand von Mueller transferred the species to Ptilotus as P. parviflorus in his Systematic Census of Australian Plants. The specific epithet (parviflorus) means 'small-flowered'.

== Distribution and habitat ==
Ptilotus parviflorus grows in a variety of habitats, including clay plains and is widespread in central-western Queensland, extending to near the coast near Townsville. It is also found in New South Wales as far south as Forbes and in central Northern Territory.

== Conservation status ==
Ptilotus parviflorus is listed as of "least concern" under the Queensland Government Nature Conservation Act 1992.
