= Charlie Flannigan (stockman) =

First person to be legally executed in the Northern Territory of Australia

Charlie Flannigan (c. 1870 - 15 July 1893) was an Aboriginal Australian stockman from the then colony of Queensland who was the first person to be executed in the Northern Territory in 1893.

== Biography ==
Flannigan came to the Northern Territory in 1883, where he became a skilled stockman and jockey.

He shot dead the acting manager "Greenhide" Sam Croker of Auvergne Station, a remote Northern Territory cattle station on 20 September 1892, after Croker had shot dead an Aboriginal man.

He escaped to Western Australia, later turning himself in. He was transported to Darwin, where he was incarcerated in Darwin's Fannie Bay Gaol in 1893, and sentenced to death.

While waiting to be executed, over 10 months Flannigan did over 80 drawings, now held at the South Australian Museum.

He was executed just after 9:00am on 15 July 1893.

== Exhibition and book ==
An exhibition of Flannigan's drawings titled A Little Bit of Justice: The Drawings of Charlie Flannigan was displayed at the Northern Territory Library in Parliament House in Darwin in 2021. An exhibition of the same name was mounted at the South Australian Museum from May to September 2023, with an accompanying book by Darwin researcher, curator and author, Donald Nawurlany Christophersen.
