= Augustus Lucanus =

Police officer and colonist in British colonial Australia

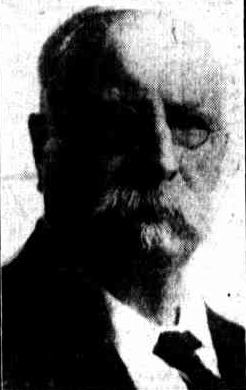
Augustus Lucanus, c. 1926

Augustus Lucanus or August Lucanus (1848 – 18 January 1941) was a police officer and businessman in British colonial Australia. He played an important role in facilitating the colonisation of various goldfield regions in the Northern Territory and Western Australia. As both a police officer and civilian, Lucanus helped lead numerous punitive expeditions against Indigenous Australians resulting in multiple massacres of these people.

== Early life ==
Lucanus was born in what is now Germany in 1848. He fought in the Franco-Prussian War of 1870, serving with the Uhlan division of German army. He later decided to emigrate to the British colony of South Australia arriving aboard the Herschel in Port Adelaide on 12 January 1877.

== Northern Territory ==
In February 1878, Lucanus moved to the recently established colonial outpost of Darwin in the Northern Territory of the British colony of South Australia. A month later he was appointed as a constable in the Northern Territory Police Force. He was initially posted to the goldfields at Yam Creek and then later to the nearby goldfields at Pine Creek. He was involved in licencing and maintaining order amongst the prospectors. He was wounded when stones were pelted at him during a disturbance between Anglo and Chinese diggers in 1880.

In 1882, the head stockman at Elsey Station, Duncan Campbell, was killed by local Mangarayi people. A telegram was sent to Yam Creek police station and a two-month punitive expedition led by Corporal George Montagu and Augustus Lucanus was organised. Lucanus claimed that the Aboriginal people (or niggers as he referred to them) received a "good reception" with several being shot dead.

In 1883, Lucanus left the police force and went into business in Darwin, establishing a firm called Lucanus & Hedley, which ran an auction-house, hotel and general store. A year later, when four miners Thomas Schollert, John Landers, Harry Houschildt and Johannes Noltenius, were killed by Aboriginal people at the Daly River Copper Mine, several punitive expeditions were organised. One of the larger civilian ones, consisting of 19 armed and mounted men, was led by Lucanus. He later described how they followed up several groups of Aboriginal people and "dispersed" them. It was recorded that Lucanus' party "shot down every native they saw, women and children included".

== The Kimberley ==
In 1885, gold was found at Hall's Creek in the Kimberley region of Western Australia. Lucanus decided to establish a store at mouth of the Ord River where a port would be established to facilitate the entry of miners into the area. He travelled overland from Darwin to the Ord while his supplies were sent by ship. On his journey the local Aborigines speared his horses and again Lucanus gave them a "good reception". He received a light spear wound in one of these violent encounters. He built his store at the mouth of the river but soon moved it upriver to where the port for the new township of Wyndham had been established.

Interestingly, his boat was later stolen by local Aboriginal people who used it to hunt turtles on Lacrosse Island. He also had an argument with an Aboriginal man named "Pompey" who had been part of the Australian Aboriginal cricket team in England in 1868. Lucanus refused to serve him and Pompey told him off for not giving his black employees wages. Pompey challenged him to a fist-fight, but Lucanus picked up a pick-axe handle which stopped any contest.

When a prospector named George Barnett from the Panton River was killed by Aborigines in 1888, Lucanus was enrolled as a "special constable" in a punitive party that set out to "disperse the blacks". During the three week expedition, the group had dispersed over 600 men, women and children, with a newspaper reporting "only six niggers butchered". They also brought back two small Aboriginal boys with them as "trophies". Lucanus remembers dispersing around 200 Aboriginal people in this incident while Mary Durack wrote that it was one of the most sweeping massacres in the region's history with one participant killing 35 people. The Government Resident of Roebourne stated that 70 were killed.

Lucanus was signed up as a "special constable" in another punitive expedition in 1892, but on this occasion was unsuccessful in capturing or killing any "native depredators".

== Western Australia Police Force ==
Lucanus joined the Western Australia Police Force in 1893 and was stationed near Wyndham. When James Durack's station was ransacked, Lucanus captured a whole clan of Aboriginal people, with one later being shot. The rest were chained up and sent to Wyndham. On a punitive expedition to the Behn River in July 1893, Lucanus with his police and P.B. Durack had a battle with local Aboriginal men. Police trooper Joe Collins was killed in the conflict while Lucanus' horse was speared to death from underneath him. At least 23 Aborigines were massacred. The punitive expedition which followed to avenge the death of Collins consisted of a large number of police including Lucanus. The party travelled 1,000 km over two months through the Kimberley shooting and capturing Aboriginal people as they went. The police reports claim that 30 Aboriginal people were shot dead although this number was probably understated.

Lucanus was transferred to Perth and then to Cue at the heads of the Murchison River. After he refused to support his fellow police officer stationed there, he resigned in 1896.

== Wiluna ==
After leaving the police force, Lucanus moved to the desert gold-mining town of Wiluna where he established a hotel and store. He lived here for most of the remaining part of his life, dying in 1941. He is buried at Karrakatta Cemetery in Perth.

== Family ==
Lucanus married twice in his life. His first wife was Ellen Fowler with whom he had two children: William Charles Lucanus and Annie Lucanus. Ellen died in 1920 and Augustus, in 1928 at the age of eighty, married Caroline Hoschen. Caroline died three years later.

Lucanus' daughter Annie married James Campbell Thompson in 1907. Thompson was a police officer and later became a pastoralist and drover. He was killed in 1911 by Aboriginal people along the Canning Stock Route. Sergeant Richard Henry Pilmer of the Western Australian Police later led a "nigger hunting expedition" to avenge his death.

Lucanus has many descendants in Western Australia including Brent Lucanus, who was lead singer of 1970s Perth band Boys.
