= Mass poisonings of Aboriginal Australians =

Deliberate mass poisonings in colonial Australia

- Date: 1820s to 2015
- Attack type: Poisoning
- Deaths: hundreds of documented deaths
- Assailant: British colonists
- Motive: removal of Aboriginal people from the land; racism; revenge

Numerous recorded instances of mass poisonings of Aboriginal Australians occurred during the British colonisation of Australia. The desire to remove Aboriginal people from the land and the want to neutralise Aboriginal resistance led colonists to look for ways to kill or drive Aboriginal people away. Typical methods of achieving this involved punitive expeditions and massacres through the use of guns and other weaponry. Occasionally mass-poisoning was also used as a method.

Poisoned consumables, such as flour, was either knowingly given out to groups of Aboriginal people, or purposely left in accessible places where they were taken away and eaten collectively by the local clans. Subsequently, incidents of deaths of Aboriginal people due to the consumption of deliberately poisoned substances occurred throughout the decades, and in many different locations of Australia.

There are some notable documented cases of poisonings involving investigations by police and government, as well as legal proceedings. The onset of mass-poisoning as a method of killing Aboriginal people coincided with the introduction, from the 1820s onwards, of toxic substances used in the sheep farming industry. Chemicals such as arsenic, strychnine, corrosive sublimate, aconitum and prussic acid were involved.

== Examples ==
- 1824, Bathurst, New South Wales – members of the Wiradjuri people poisoned with arsenic-infused damper (a type of bread made by the settlers).
- 1827, Hunter Valley, New South Wales – colonists along the Hunter River accused of poisoning of Aboriginal people with corrosive sublimate.
- 1830s, Gangat, New South Wales – some Aboriginal people died near Gloucester, New South Wales, after allegedly having eaten "Johnny cakes" laced with arsenic in up to three separate incidents.
- 1839, Mansfield, Victoria - a mass poisoning of the yowung-illum balug clan of the Taungurung was reported.
- 1840s, Wagga Wagga, New South Wales – pioneer colonists to the region, William Best and Alexander Davidson, both recounted large scale deliberate poisonings of local Wiradjuri people in the early 1840s. The poison was delivered via milk or through the poisoning of waterholes. Mary Gilmore, who lived near Wagga Wagga as a child, also documented several cases of mass poisonings that occurred around the Murrumbidgee River.
- 1840, Glen Innes, New South Wales – reports of deaths of Aboriginal people by prussic acid poisoning investigated by government authorities but denied by pastoralists.
- 1841, Wannon River, Victoria – at least seven Aboriginal people poisoned to death on one of the Henty brothers' leaseholds.
- 1842, Tarrone, Victoria – at least nine Aboriginal people poisoned to death near Port Fairy by being given poisoned flour on the squatting run of James Kilgour.
- 1842, Mount Kilcoy, Queensland – more than fifty Aboriginal people were poisoned to death at an outpost of Evan Mackenzie's Kilcoy property.
- 1844, Ipswich, Queensland – around a dozen Aboriginal people were poisoned at the government-run farm known as Plough Station near Ipswich. A convict, John Seller, offered them biscuits containing arsenic after a dispute over him taking a female member of the clan. Three died and Seller was charged with their murder. He avoided conviction but as he was already serving a sentence for a previous crime, he was transferred south to the Cockatoo Island prison where he was released two years later.
- 1846, Tyntynder, Victoria – between 8 and 20 Aboriginal people allegedly killed by eating poisoned flour allegedly given to them by Scottish colonist Andrew Beveridge near Swan Hill.
- 1847, Whiteside, Queensland – at least three Aboriginal people allegedly killed by arsenic-laced flour being placed out for them to take. This occurred on the Whiteside squatting run of Captain George Griffin.
- 1847, Kangaroo Creek, New South Wales – close to 30 Aboriginal people killed by poison given to them in flour by Thomas Coutts near Grafton. Coutts was arrested and sent to Sydney but the case was dropped.
- 1849, Port Lincoln, South Australia – five Aboriginal people including an infant were killed after being given flour mixed with arsenic by hutkeeper Patrick Dwyer near Port Lincoln. Despite being arrested with strong evidence against him, Dwyer was released from custody by Charles Driver, the Government Resident at Port Lincoln.
- 1856, Hornet Bank, Queensland – a number of Aboriginal people killed by being given strychnine-laced Christmas pudding in the lead-up to the Hornet Bank massacre.
- 1860s, Warginburra Peninsula, Queensland – Edward Hampton "Cranky" Baker added arsenic to his food stores knowing they would be stolen by the local Aboriginal people living on his "Peninsula" land-holding adjoining Shoalwater Bay. The shooting and poisoning of these people greatly diminished their number. Baker also had land near the town of Rockhampton in which supplies of arsenic-laced flour were placed. In 1870, several South Sea Islanders ate this flour and one died. Baker faced a magisterial inquiry but the matter was dropped.
- 1860s, South Ballina, New South Wales – An account from an elder of the South Ballina clan of the Bundjalung people, numbering about 200 people, outlines that they were given poisoned flour to make damper. However, the old people and children refused to eat the damper as it was a new food. Upon waking the next morning, the survivors saw many adults dead.
- 1860s, Ninderry, Queensland — A whiteman working at the Nindery cattle station near Yandina gave out flour laced with arsenic, which at least two men of the Undanbi clan ate. The men recognised the symptoms of poisoning and drank copious amounts of brackish water from the Maroochy River to make them vomit up the poison and avoid death.
- 1874, Bowen River Inn, Queensland – five Aboriginal people were poisoned outside the Bowen River Inn on the upper Bowen River. Two were killed and buried in shallow graves in the riverbed while the other three recovered.

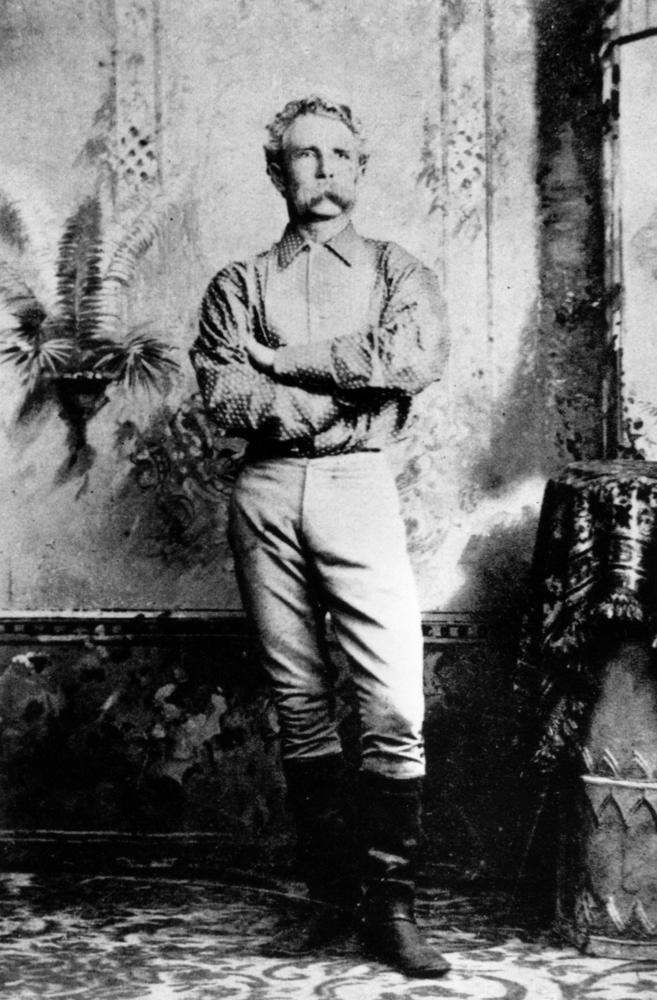
John Arthur Macartney, allegedly involved in the poisoning of Aboriginal Australians

- 1885, Florida Station, Northern Territory – a large number of Yolngu people became ill and died after being given poisoned horse-meat on John Arthur Macartney's newly established Florida cattle station in north-eastern Arnhem Land.
- 1890, Dungog, New South Wales – two young Aboriginal people begging near to town "were easily disposed of" by being given poison in their food.
- 1895, Fernmount, New South Wales – six Aboriginal people poisoned to death near Bellingen by being given aconite to drink by John Kelly. Kelly was suspected of manslaughter and committed for trial but was found not guilty and discharged.
- 1896, Lakeland Downs, Queensland – A number of Aborigines murdered a Scottish colonist, stealing his supplies. They mistook arsenic for flour, which they consumed and which resulted in their deaths. It was described by locals as "just retribution".
- 1908, Mt Ida, Western Australia – eight Aboriginal people died after ingesting food laced with cyanide near Leonora. Explorer William Carr-Boyd described the victims as "eight niggers...dirty, lazy, thieving..human wolves [who]...got something more to eat than they bargained for". A later government enquiry concluded that the eight people had died from being speared by other Aboriginal people on the basis that one of the decomposing corpses displayed a hole that appeared "different". The medical officer involved refused to analyse the bodies for poison.
- 1931 Sandover River, Northern Territory – Police officer William George Murray appears to have participated in a mass poisoning of Aboriginal Australians while he was posted at Arltunga.
- 1936, Timber Creek, Northern Territory – five Aboriginal people killed by arsenic being put in their food near Timber Creek after the spearing of a white man.
- 1937, APY Lands, South Australia - Four Aboriginal men and two boys were poisoned to death after a white dingo trapper left poisoned flour, treacle and sugar for the Aboriginal people to consume following a dispute over his access to the women in the clan.
- 1981, Alice Springs, Northern Territory – two Aboriginal people were killed and fourteen others were made ill by drinking from a bottle of sherry which had strychnine deliberately added to it. The poisoned bottle was intentionally left by persons unknown in a place of easy access to this group of Aboriginal people.
- 2015, Collarenebri, New South Wales – three Aboriginal people, Norman Boney, Sandra Boney and Roger Adams, were poisoned to death after buying methanol-laced moonshine from Mary Miller in the town of Collarenebri. Miller was not charged in relation to the deaths and only received a $5,000 fine for selling liquor without a licence from magistrate Clare Girotti. The NSW Coroner later stated that the ingestion of methanol contributed to their deaths.

== In popular culture ==
The Secret River, a 2005 novel by Kate Grenville, graphically depicts a fictional account of a deliberate mass poisoning of Indigenous Australians camped along the Hawkesbury River. The novel was later adapted into a stage play and also a television mini-series.

Twelve Canoes, a 2008 documentary project and series about the culture and history of the Yolŋu people directed by Rolf de Heer, relates details of the Florida Station poisoning that allegedly occurred in Arnhem Land in 1885.

Edenglassie, the multi-award-winning 2023 historical novel by Melissa Lucashenko, details Aboriginal groups' fear and trauma of mass murder by poisoning in the 19th century. Characters refer to poisoned flour as 'muckenzie' flour. In an author's note at the conclusion of the book, Lucashenko writes that "the campaign of sustained attacks across the Australian continent from the late 1700s can only be viewed as constituting either war crimes, or as terrorism".

== See also ==
- Genocide of Indigenous Australians
- List of massacres of Indigenous Australians
- Smallpox blankets
