= Minnamurra River massacre =

Massacre in New South Wales, Australia

Date	1 October 1818
Location	Minnamurra River bank, Illawarra
Result	Approximately six Wodiwodi people killed in clash with colonial settlers

Belligerents
William Frederick Weston, Cornelius O'Brien and seven convicts and labourers	Unknown group, Wodiwodi people

Commanders and leaders
William Frederick Weston	Unknown

Strength
nine	Unknown

Casualties and losses
None	approximately six, exact number unknown

On 1 October 1818, approximately six Wodiwodi people were killed in a clash with nine settlers from the Colony of New South Wales along the Minnamurra River in the Illawarra, New South Wales.

The settlers claimed to have been attempting to recover two muskets which had been lent to some of the Aboriginal people which escalated into an armed clash. Local Dapto property owner, William Frederick Weston, his site overseer, Cornelius O'Brien, John Stewart, stock keeper, John McArthy, and William Richards, along with unknown convicts and labourers approached an Aboriginal campsite in the early hours of the morning, armed with muskets, swords and knives attached to long sticks. Stewart, Richards and McArthy, as well as the constable for Illawarra, Joseph Wild would testify to magistrates in Sydney in a subsequent inquiry. The magistrates concluded that they were not satisfied that allegations of vigilante action could be proven, a decision that then Governor Lachlan Macquarie would strongly disagree with, arguing that the men had set out with the intention of hostility upon Indigenous Australians.

An unknown Aboriognal woman told Young Bundle, Dharawal man reported that the settlers had killed all those in the camp that they came across. The primary magistrate that judged the case was D'Arcy Wentworth, would later own over 5000 acres in the area, that would have belonged to those killed.

== Location ==
The exact location of the massacre is disputed. Research led by Professor Lyndall Ryan, has led to an approximate location of the massacre site, north of Kiama.

In 2019, the Kiama Council unveiled a memorial in commemoration of the massacre, the memorial was erected at the southern end of the Minnamurra Bridge

The site of the massacre is under threat from sand mining by Boral. Excavations have led to the uncovering of over 15000 artefacts, and were not halted despite concerns over the disturbance of Indigenous burial sites.

== See also ==
- List of massacres of Indigenous Australians
- Australian frontier wars
