= Auvergne Station =

Pastoral lease in the Northern Territory

Coordinates: 15.68556°S 130.00819°E

Location in Northern Territory

Auvergne Station, often just referred to as Auvergne, is a pastoral lease that operates as a cattle station in the Northern Territory of Australia.

== Location ==
It is located about 50 kilometres (31 mi) west of Timber Creek and 137 kilometres (85 mi) east of Kununurra, in the Northern Territory but close to the border of Western Australia. Auvergne shares a boundary with Bullo River Station to the north, Newry to the west and the Winan Aboriginal Land Trust to the south. The Victoria Highway and the Auvegne Stock Route both bisect the property from east to west.

== Description ==
Occupying an area of 4,142 square kilometres (1,599 sq mi) of which about half is forested country, a quarter of which is open plains well covered in mitchell and flinders grasses. The last quarter is made up of red loam river country and coastal flood plains. The property is capable of carrying 32,000 head of stock and annually turns off 10,000 head to markets in Asia via the port of Wyndham in Western Australia. The property is currently operated by Clean Agriculture and International Tourism.

Several watercourses run through the property including the Bullo River, Baines River, East Baines River, Blackfellow Creek and Snake Creek with the Victoria River forming the northern boundary.

== History ==
Auvergne was established in 1886. The initial owner was John Arthur Macartney, who had 2,000 cattle overlanded to Auvergne in 1886 with another 8,000 on the road behind them. Sam "Greenhide" Croker was one of the first station managers at Auvergne. He was shot dead in 1892 during a game of cards by an Aboriginal stockman named Charley Flannigan. Flannigan was arrested at Ord River Station and escorted to Darwin for trial, where he was found guilty and duly executed in 1893. Flannigan was the first person legally executed in the Northern Territory.

The notorious Jack Watson took over management at Auvergne after the death of Croker but only lasted a year, resigning in 1894.

The property was acquired by Francis Connor and Denis Doherty in 1896, by this stage the station occupied an area of 2,000 square miles (5,180 km^{2}) with frontage onto the Victoria River. It was stocked with approximately 7,000 head of cattle and 300 horses and was to be managed by Mr Desmond. By 1897 Michael Durack became a part-owner of the station.

Flanagan was arrested at Ord River Station and escorted to Darwin for trial. Flanagan was tried, found guilty and duly executed in 1893.

By 1905 the size of the station was estimated at 1,640 square miles (4,248 km^{2}) and had a herd of approximately 20,000 shorthorn cattle said at the time to be "in splendid condition". The recent seasons had been good and the Baynes River East and Baynes River east were both flowing with the billabongs and lakes all full of water.

A stockman named Alexander McDonald was murdered by Aboriginal people at Auvergne in 1918, he was found by the station manager, Archie Skulthorp, with a spear in his back and the "tracks of a big mob of natives" leading off into the bush.

By 1923 the size of the property was estimated at 5,900 square miles (15,281 km^{2}) and it was one of the larger runs in the Northern Territory, although it was less than half the size of the largest of the day, Victoria River Downs, which occupied 13,100 square miles (33,929 km^{2}).

An Aboriginal murderer known as "Tiger" was murdered himself at Auvergne in 1953. Tiger was killed by another Aborigine man known as "Split Lip Dick", who fled into the bush with Tiger's young wife. Over 5,000 unbranded scrub bulls had to be shot at the property in the same year. Most of were thought to have come from neighbouring Victoria River Downs, which was a far less developed property. Auvergne had a herd of about 18,000 head in 1953. At about the same time the property had been acquired by the Peel River Land and Mineral Company along with Headingly Station in Queensland.

In 2010 the station manager, Stuart McKechnie, found the fossilised remains of a diprotodon sticking out of a riverbank on the property. Although lacking a tail and a head, the skeleton was almost completely intact. McKechnie kept the remains a secret for two years before palaeontologists from the Museum and Art Gallery of the Northern Territory came to excavate it in 2012.

== See also ==
- List of ranches and stations
- List of the largest stations in Australia
