= John Arthur Macartney =

Irish-born Australian colonist, pastoralist, squatter and grazier

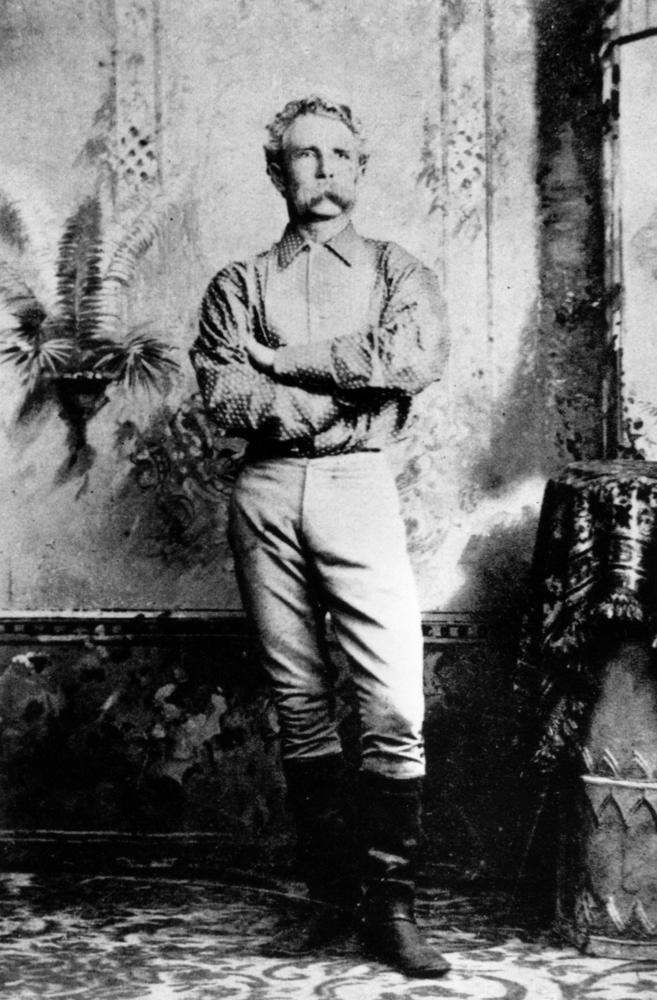
John Arthur Macartney in 1890

John Arthur Macartney (5 April 1834 – 10 June 1917) was an Irish-born Australian colonist, pastoralist, squatter and grazier who established a large number of frontier cattle stations in Queensland and the Northern Territory.

== Early life ==
John Arthur Macartney was born into the prominent Macartney-Burgh family at Creagh, County Cork, Ireland in 1834. His ancestors were notable members of the British ruling class of Ireland generally known as the Protestant Ascendancy. His great-grandfather was Walter Hussey Burgh, Chief Baron of the Irish Exchequer, and his grandfather was Sir John Macartney, 1st Baronet of Lish, County Armagh. He was educated at Lucan School and by private tutors in Dublin.

== Emigration to the British colonies in Australia ==
In 1847, at the age of 13, J.A. Macartney emigrated to Melbourne with his parents, arriving in January 1848 aboard the Stag. His father, the Very Reverend Hussey Burgh Macartney had come to Australia to take up the position of the Dean of Melbourne within the Anglican church, a role he held until 1894. J.A. Macartney finished his education in Melbourne and after a brief period working with a law firm and prospecting for gold during the Victorian gold rush, he decided to pursue a career as a grazier. His father bought him the Wandiligong property in the Ovens River region, but he quickly sold out and bought the nearby Whorouly property. Here, he met Edward Graves Mayne who became his business partner in establishing cattle properties for the next 30 years.

== Acquiring land in the Rockhampton region ==
In 1857, Macartney decided to travel to the northern limits of British colonisation with a view to acquire landholdings. At this point of time the frontier was the Port Curtis District where the fledgling township of Rockhampton was situated. In early 1858, Macartney rode into Rockhampton with fellow colonist Dan Connor and Native Police officers John Murray and G.P.M. Murray. They found that the town only consisted of a store, an inn and two residents. Macartney soon acquired two large parcels of land: Glenmore on the northern bank of the Fitzroy River; and Waverley on grassland plains inland from Broad Sound. He also travelled out to the Mackenzie River with his cousin Sir John Macartney 3rd baronet, and P.F. MacDonald and staked further ownership claims to large acreages. All this land was inhabited by various local groups of Aboriginal Australians whose ownership rights were largely ignored by both the colonists and the colonial government. Macartney's own father, who held the respected social position of the Dean of Melbourne, is even quoted as saying that the Aboriginal people "were not the rightful owners of the soil" and had "not been unjustly dispossessed by the white man". When Macartney wrote his memoir, he concluded it with one of his favourite poems which was entitled "Take It Now" giving a further indication of his philosophy toward life.

In 1859, Macartney attempted to stock the Belmont property with sheep when a shepherd named Tarrant was killed by local Aboriginal men. 2nd Lieutenant Frederick Carr of the Native Police together with his troopers, the Macartneys, P.F. MacDonald and Henry Brisdon, formed an armed group which set out to track down those responsible. The group followed the tracks and upon finding the Aboriginal camp used the Aboriginal troopers to "disperse" them. One account of this incident describes how around hundred of the tribe were rounded up and "it ended in the usual way and the bulk of the wild mob were shot".

In 1860 and 1861, Macartney formed or bought several other squatting pastoral properties in the region including Yatton, Avon Downs, Wolfang, Huntley, St Helens and Bloomsbury. He quickly sold these on for profit and focused on establishing his Waverley property as both a place of residence and a working cattle station. He sold St Helens and Bloomsbury to his cousins Sir John Macartney and William George Macartney, who subsequently had years of frontier conflict with the local Aboriginal population, calling in the Native Police on several occasions to conduct punitive expeditions.

At Waverley, Macartney built a homestead and brought his wife, Annie Wallace-Dunlop whom he married in Melbourne in 1861, to live with him. The homestead had "shooting holes" in the walls "in case of attack by blacks". Waverley became Macartney's main residence until 1896.

== Expansion into western Queensland ==
Drought, flood and financial difficulties in the early 1870s at Waverley contributed to Macartney deciding to expand his pastoral interests into the newly colonised areas of western Queensland. Macartney journeyed out to the Diamantina River where he established the Diamantina Lakes Station in 1875. In the following years he also bought the Bladensburg, Manuka, Tamworth, Yarrowmere and Amphitheatre stations in the Pelican Waterhole and Hughenden regions. Further north toward the Gulf of Carpentaria and in partnership with Hugh Louis Heber-Percy, he bought the Escott station in 1882.

When taking up the Bladensburg property, Macartney is said to have wanted to view and take some of the unusual shin-bones of Aboriginal people who had been shot there in the previous months by the Native Police. Carl Lumholtz, a travelling ethnographer from Norway, was shown the remaining skulls by Macartney's station manager in the early 1880s. The site of the massacre was and still is called Skull Hole and is now part of a national park.

Macartney held Diamantina Lakes until 1909 and many of the geographical features on the property are named after him and his business partner E.G. Mayne. These include Mount Macartney, Mayne Range and Macartney Range. Much of the landholding is now also a national park.

== Northern Territory ==
In 1884, the government of the British colony of South Australia opened up large parcels of uncolonised land in the Northern Territory for sale. Macartney took up the offer and purchased Florida Station for "half-a-crown per mile", the station consisting of 10,000 square miles of country and 300 miles of coastline, most of which is now called the East Arnhem Region. The government report of the region just before Macartney's purchase read that some of the country consisted of "magnificent plains" but also that "the natives are numerous and inclined to be hostile". In 1885, Macartney himself went to the region to inspect the property, where he and his companions had a skirmish with local Aboriginal people, firing their rifles at them. Undeterred, Macartney organised 1,500 head of cattle and 200 horses to be overlanded from his Waverley property to Florida Station, a distance of around 2,000 miles. This feat of droving was conducted by Macartney's head stockmen, brothers Jim and Alf Randell. Jim Randell established the homestead at Florida and managed the property for Macartney. He bolted a small swivel cannon to the verandah of the new house to "keep the blacks...at arm's length". Poisoned horse-meat was also given out to the local Aboriginal people which resulted in the deaths of many.

Initially, Florida Station looked like being a successful venture, however, monsoonal floods in the wet-season and a previously unknown fatal disease in his cattle brought misfortune to Macartney. Increasingly aggressive resistance from the Aboriginal people in the region brought matters to a point and in 1892, Macartney decided to abandon Florida Station. As Ernestine Hill wrote in her book The Territory, "the blacks chased them out".

Prior to abandoning Florida Station, Macartney had also bought into several other pastoral properties in the Northern Territory of which the large Auvergne Station on the Victoria River was the principal one. Macartney's experiences at Auvergne were as equally violent and financially disastrous as they were at Florida. His first manager there, Tom Hardy, was speared to death by members of the local Ngarinman people in 1889. Hardy's replacement, James "Barney" Flynn, who had worked for Macartney at Florida, appears to have developed severe psychological trauma from the frontier conflict there. When colonist Michael Durack visited Auvergne in 1890, he described Flynn as having hallucinations of being "surrounded by wild blacks" and waking up in the middle of the night "yelling like a maniac", running into the yard and firing his revolver into the empty night. Flynn soon left and Macartney employed Sam "Greenhide" Croker as station manager who was famous for helping establish the nearby Wave Hill Station. In 1892 Croker was shot dead at Auvergne by an Aboriginal stockman during a game of cards.

After the killing of Croker, Macartney hired John "Jack" Watson as manager for Auvergne. Watson came with an extreme reputation, being described as "one of the most violent men on the Northern frontier". With Frank Hann, Watson had established the Lawn Hill cattle station in Queensland. A visitor to the Lawn Hill homestead in 1883 noted that "Mr Watson has 40 pairs of blacks' ears nailed round the walls collected during raiding parties." Watson had been in charge of Macartney's Florida Station during its final years and transferred the cattle from that abandoned station to Auvergne in 1893. By this stage, a global economic depression had set in and Macartney fell into severe financial difficulty. By 1896 he had sold off all his property interests in the Northern Territory.

== Later life ==
In addition to having to sell all his properties in the Northern Territory, the financial shock of the mid-1890s also forced Macartney to sell out almost all of his Queensland properties, including his home residence of Waverley station. He only retained the Diamantina Lakes property where he moved to in 1897. Now aged in his 60s with his pastoral empire destroyed, Macartney took on a contract as a mailman to make ends meet. His situation slowly improved and in 1908 he was able to sell Diamantina Lakes to Sidney Kidman for £27,000. Macartney now owned only relatively small interests in land near Longreach and at Baffle Creek and obtained employment as general manager for the Queensland Cattle Company.

In 1912, he retired to Brisbane in relative wealth, purchasing the exclusive Ormiston House Estate where he died on 10 June 1917.

Some of his descendants include mountaineer Tim Macartney-Snape and Australian Broadcasting Corporation board member Georgie Somerset.
