= Jack Watson (cattle station manager) =

Frontier cattleman of Queensland and Northern Territory

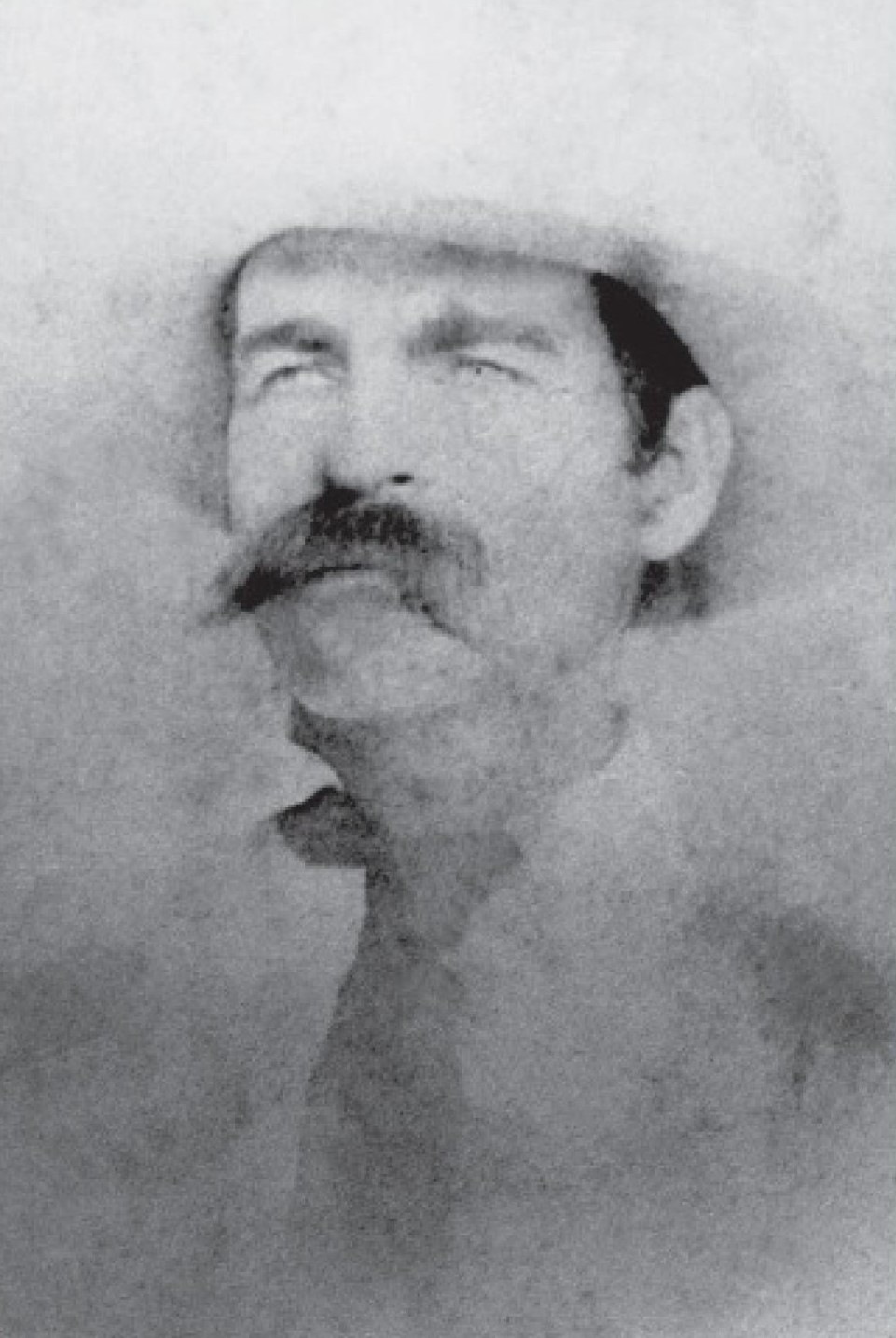
Jack Watson, c. 1880

John Watson (March 1852 − 1 April 1896), more commonly known as Jack Watson, was a frontier cattle station manager, drover, and mass-murderer in the British colony of Queensland and in the Northern Territory. He was renowned for his fearless behaviour and also his sadistic brutality toward Indigenous Australians. He was called "The Gulf Hero" due to much of his fame being achieved while working on pastoral properties located in the Gulf Country.

== Early life ==
Watson was born in March 1852 in Melbourne in the British colony of Victoria. He came from the wealthy Anglo-Irish Watson family which had significant landholdings around Kilconnor in County Carlow, Ireland. He was the eldest son of George John Watson who emigrated to Victoria in 1850 and was a noteworthy businessman and horse-racing identity, having important roles in establishing the Victorian Racing Club, the Melbourne Hunt Club, the Cobb & Co transportation company and the Melbourne Cup.

Jack grew up in the Melbourne suburb of St Kilda in a stately house named "Fenagh Cottage" after his father's home village of Fenagh, County Carlow. He was educated at the Melbourne Church of England Grammar School where he excelled at sports, becoming captain of the rowing team. Jack also became an accomplished horseman with him, his father and brothers all being well known for their abilities in steeplechase racing.

As a young man in the 1870s, it appears that Watson became bored with living in Melbourne and took to a lifestyle travelling by sea, heading to the tropical regions. It has been said that while working as a sailor he jumped into the water to rescue a man overboard, taking a knife to a shark that was cruising around the vessel. The Watson family history states that he resided some of the time in the newly formed port town of Palmerston in the Northern Territory. For the remainder of the 1870s it seems that he continued to travel, occasionally returning to Melbourne.

== Queensland ==
The Watson family became involved in Queensland cattle station management through Jack's brother, William Henry Watson who was also known as Currawilla Bill. In 1881, William Henry was appointed manager of Currawilla Station in the southwest of the colony of Queensland. He was famous for his athletic and shooting abilities and would make the Aboriginal workers at Currawilla stand with matchboxes on their heads or between their noses and shoot them off. These activities were similar to Jack's recorded hobby of shooting jam tins off the heads of Aboriginal people.

=== Lawn Hill Station ===
In 1882, Jack himself was appointed manager of Lawn Hill Station in the Queensland Gulf Country, 600 km (370 mi) north of Currawilla. Lawn Hill was owned by Frank Hann, a man noted for brutality against Indigenous people. Emily Creaghe, a traveller who passed through Lawn Hill in 1883, wrote in her diary:

"Mr Watson has 40 pairs of blacks' ears nailed round the walls collected during raiding parties after the loss of many cattle speared by the blacks."

The massacres perpetrated by Jack Watson and Frank Hann when collecting these ears, were not the only ones committed at Lawn Hill. The local detachment of the paramilitary Native Police under Sub-Inspector James Lamond shot "over 100 blacks" from 1883 to 1885 on that property alone.

As well as managing Lawn Hill, Watson led droving excursions from there to stock the frontier Macarthur River Station with cattle. While returning to Lawn Hill from one of these journeys, Watson encountered another droving party whose horses had been speared by local Aboriginal people at a place called Skeleton Creek. Watson took it upon himself and his "blackboys" to conduct a punitive expedition and spent two weeks tracking and hunting what fellow drover Charley Gaunt called "those niggers, shooting them down as he came up with them until there was not a black on the creek". Watson also led another punitive expedition in the Burketown region around this time, where after a week out hunting the "cattle-killers" he returned carrying eleven human skulls.

Watson would also employ torturous means of punishment when he was displeased with the Aboriginal employees. In a conversation with Alfred Searcy, Watson boasted that he would lash them with a stock whip to which a piece of wire was attached to the end, and at other times would drive a sharpened stick through the palms of their hands.

== Northern Territory ==
=== Alexandria Station ===
By 1886, Jack Watson was working for the North Australian Pastoral Company, mustering and droving cattle from their massive Alexandria Station in the Northern Territory to markets in the south. He still maintained a business partnership with Frank Hann as well as his brother, the explorer and pastoralist William Hann. In 1889, William Hann committed suicide by drowning himself in the sea off Townsville. Watson, who was travelling with Hann, attempted to save him but failed.

=== Florida and Auvergne Stations ===
In the immediate aftermath of William Hann's drowning in 1889, Watson decided to change employers completely and took on a contract with John Arthur Macartney to manage his Florida Station cattle property in Arnhem Land. Indigenous resistance here was fierce with the previous manager of the property, Jim Randell, having to bolt a swivel cannon to the verandah of the homestead to keep "the blacks...at arm's length". Watson took a more aggressive role against the Aboriginal population and would conduct expeditions to hunt them down. An associate of his recalled how Watson "wiped out a lot" of "the blacks" living on the coast at Blue Mud Bay and Caledon Bay. During the period of Watson's management, another large massacre is recorded to have happened at Mirki on the north coast of Florida Station. The Yolngu people today remember this massacre where many people including children were shot dead.

The wet season in Arnhem Land would sometimes flood the plains at Florida Station for months and Watson would spend these periods either shooting buffalo, lounging at the pubs in Darwin or travelling to Hong Kong or Shanghai to play polo.

In 1892, flooding, fatal bovine diseases and Aboriginal resistance forced Macartney into the decision to abandon Florida Station. He employed Watson to take apart the buildings, muster up the remaining cattle and overland them to Macartney's other property at Auvergne Station on the Victoria River in the north-western region of the Territory. The stock-routes in the Northern Territory that drovers such as Watson utilised to transport cattle were known places of violence. After interviewing Watson about them, the Administrator of the Northern Territory, Charles Dashwood, came to the conclusion that the drovers "shot the blacks down like crows along the route". Before heading out from Darwin to shutdown Florida Station, it was communicated to Watson that a number of Yolngu men were going to kill him. Reports emerged that Watson was speared to death while dismantling Florida in 1893 but these proved to be false.

Once at Auvergne, Watson took over operations there from Sam "Greenhide" Croker who had recently been shot dead during a game of cards by an Aboriginal stockman named Charley Flannigan. Watson only lasted another year at Auvergne, resigning in 1894.

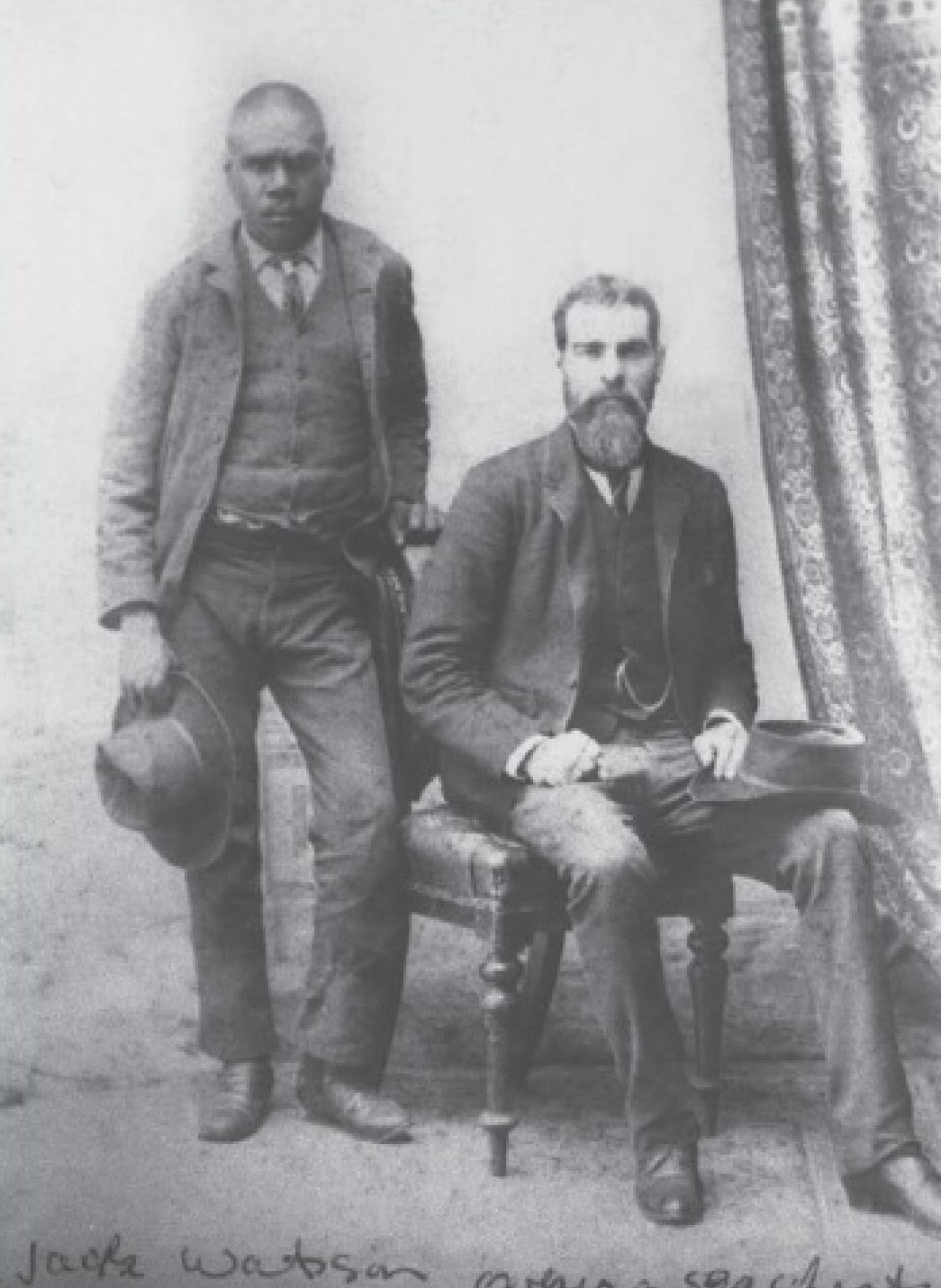
Jack Watson with his Aboriginal assistant

=== Victoria River Downs Station ===
In March 1895, Watson was employed by Goldsbrough Mort & Co. to manage the Victoria River Downs Station which neighboured the Auvergne property. Watson by this stage had such a "bad name among the blacks" that the Aboriginal people used as cheap labour on the station had all run away. Even his own "blackboy" servant named Pompey had cleared out. This did not change Watson's attitude and when he later heard that Pompey had been killed, he asked the local mounted police constable, William Willshire to bring him Pompey's skull so he could use it as a spittoon. Willshire complied with the request and brought him the skull.

Not long after he started at Victoria River Downs, a group of Aboriginal people attacked a supply wagon travelling through nearby Jasper Gorge. Two colonists were seriously wounded and a significant amount of firearms and ammunition were taken. It was thought that with these weapons, a formidable local Aboriginal uprising could result. Before the police could act, Watson decided to organise a punitive expedition himself, to punish those involved and also try to recover the guns. He gathered 17 armed and mounted men and in two days tracked down a large camp of Aboriginal people, fatally shooting possibly 60 people. Watson did not find any guns but he did return with three captured women. One of these women had a broken arm, another was covered in welts from being whipped and the third was lactating from her breasts but no child was with her. These women later escaped.

== Death and legacy ==
Jack Watson died in the Katherine River on 1 April 1896. While transporting supplies across the river to the town of Katherine with his companions, Watson decided to swim across but soon disappeared. It is unclear whether he was drowned or taken by a crocodile. His body was never recovered. An obituary in the local newspaper described Watson as "a fearless and clever horseman...a rough diamond...who was guided by a spirit of daring almost amounting to recklessness." It goes on to say that "the natives more than once received terribly severe lessons" from Watson and that "his ideas of revenge for murders or station depredations committed by the blacks were scarcely orthodox but they were generally up to requirements." A more recent newspaper article described Jack Watson as a "total monster."

In 2008 artist Judy Watson collaborated with Yhonnie Scarce to commemorate the escape of her great-great-grandmother Rosie from Lawn Hill Station. For the work, the two artists cast 40 pairs of ears of volunteers and nailed them to a wall.
