= Thomas Coutts (colonist) =

Australian colonist

Thomas Coutts (11 December 1797 – 14 January 1868) was an Australian colonist who emigrated from Scotland during the 19th century, establishing various enterprises including whaling and pastoral farming businesses. He is best known for perpetrating a mass poisoning of Aboriginal Australians on a property near the Clarence River in the Northern Rivers area of New South Wales, which killed at least 23 people. Although Coutts was arrested for this crime, the judicial authorities never put the case to trial and he was released after the payment of bail. Coutts afterwards became a prosperous and respected colonial figure. The town of Coutts Crossing is named after him.

== Early life ==
Thomas Coutts was born in Glenmuick, Aberdeenshire in Scotland on 11 December 1797. His parents were James and Elizabeth Coutts. He emigrated with two of his brothers to the Colony of New South Wales around 1817. He settled in Sydney and it appears that Coutts chose to follow a seafaring vocation. By the 1830s he became a master mariner, taking the title of Captain Thomas Coutts.

== Whaling ==
In 1832, Coutts and his brothers built a 90 tonne brig on the banks of the Georges River. They named the vessel the Lady Leith and Thomas Coutts was registered as both the owner and master of the brig. Initially the Lady Leith was utilised to transport cargo from Sydney to Hobart but soon was trading in sugar between Mauritius and Australia. It seems this wasn't a profitable trade as Coutts quickly switched to using his vessel as a whaler. From the mid-1830s until 1840, Coutts captained the Lady Leith in regular voyages to the whaling grounds off New Zealand, returning with cargoes of sperm whale oil for sale in Sydney. During this period, Coutts married Maria Bloodworth in 1834 and bought a house in O'Connell Street in Sydney.

== Pastoral farming ==
In early 1840, Coutts placed the Lady Leith up for sale and started to invest in pastoral farming. He and several other squatters took the opportunity of purchasing and droving herds of livestock to the Clarence River region where they could occupy supposedly vacant crown land. They were guided by an ex-convict in Richard Craig who had previously lived with the Gumbaynggirr and Bundjalung people in this area after he escaped from the Moreton Bay penal settlement. Initially Coutts set up a sheep station called Bald Hills in the New England region which was at the start of the track down to the Clarence River valley. Coutts Water which was part of his Bald Hills property, is a waterway that still bears his name and is now a popular trout fishing site.

In 1840, Coutts, led by Richard Craig, brought around five thousand head of sheep and around eight hundred cattle down the track from Bald Hills to the Clarence River valley. He laid claim to a region of open and lightly wooded country south of the river and named this leasehold Kangaroo Creek. The local Gumbaynggirr people killed Coutts' cattle and sheep, and also murdered two of his stockmen and a boy named Jeremiah Sullivan. This was reported to Commissioner Oliver Fry but nothing was done.

== Mass poisoning at Kangaroo Creek ==
In late November 1847, Coutts invited the Aboriginal people living around Kangaroo Creek to come to his homestead for the possibility of obtaining work. Coutts had previously not allowed any groups of Aboriginal people near his homestead and was widely known to have expressed the opinion that native people "deserved shooting". Around 23 people accepted the offer and Coutts put them to work weeding areas close to the homestead. After the work was completed, Coutts gave them a 10-pound bag of flour. Coutts was observed to have put the powdery contents of a paper sachet, believed to have been arsenic, into the bag of flour before giving it to the group of Gumbaynggirr. The unsuspecting people took the bag of poisoned flour from Coutts and proceeded to a communal area in the hills between Kangaroo and Towallum Creeks. Here, they made damper from the flour and ate it.

A couple of days later, several reports emerged of a large number of Aboriginal people becoming violently ill and dying in the hills behind Kangaroo Creek. The local Commissioner for Crown Lands, Oliver Fry, heard these reports from both white and black sources, and came to investigate. In January 1848, Fry visited the site and found the decomposing bodies of at least 23 people. He collected evidence including remnants of the damper that remained, and immediately arrested and charged Coutts for the crime. Local magistrates concluded Coutts should stand trial for wilful murder and he was transported to Sydney to be tried at the Supreme Court.

On 23 February, Coutts appeared before judge Alfred Stephen and was given bail on £1,000 worth of sureties. The case was delayed and on 10 May 1848, the Attorney General, John Plunkett, decided not to proceed with the case. Plunkett did this even though he had a very strong suspicion of Coutts' guilt and was aware that justice was being "entirely evaded" by this decision. Coutts was subsequently discharged and returned to Kangaroo Creek.

== Moving northwards ==
During his time at Sydney, one of Coutts' hutkeepers at Kangaroo Creek was killed by local Gumbaynggirr in an apparent revenge attack. Coutts quickly sold out of his Kangaroo Creek holdings and in 1850 he took up the Tooloom property in the ranges about 100 km to the north of Grafton. He also invested in a steamer named the Raven which provided a river transport service between Brisbane and Ipswich. In 1851, Coutts looked to gain further property by taking a large flock of sheep further north to squat on land near to Camboon on the Dawson River. European colonisation in this region was being resisted by the resident Yiman people who killed several of Coutts' shepherds and speared to death Alexander "Sandy" Ross, who was a squatter accompanying Coutts in his attempt to set up a property. Due to the resistance of the Yiman, Coutts was forced to abandon the Dawson River and returned to Tooloom. A few years later, he bought the Ellangowan property near Toowoomba. His wife died at this property in 1856 and the following year Coutts sold the Raven.

== Later life ==
In 1859, Coutts decided to retire from the violent yet profitable frontier pastoralist lifestyle and bought a mansion in the waterside Sydney suburb of Balmain where he stayed until 1866. The residence he purchased, known as "Balmoral House", still exists today under that name at 46 Waterview Street in Balmain. In 1866, Coutts decided to return to the land and purchased the North Toolburra property near Warwick in the recently established Colony of Queensland. By this stage, this area was hundreds of kilometres within the frontier of European colonisation but Coutts still managed to meet his death at Toolburra soon after moving there. In January 1868, Coutts was walking under a tree that was being felled on this property and when he was hit on the head by a large branch, killing him instantly. A large funeral was organised at Warwick and he is buried in the Coutts family plot at Warwick General Cemetery.

== Family and legacy ==
Thomas Coutts had two notable brothers, one of which was Donald Coutts who accompanied Thomas throughout most of his pastoral pursuits. Donald took over the running of Tooloom from Thomas and also took up the Rosewood leasehold near Ipswich. Donald, like Thomas, was involved in a number of major incidents of frontier violence with Aboriginal people. Thomas' other brother was Reverend James Coutts who was a minister at Parramatta and then Newcastle and is known for the establishment of the Coutt's Sailors Home in the latter city.

Thomas Coutts had nine children with Maria Bloodworth with many marrying into well respected colonial families.

Several landmarks are named after Thomas Coutts. This includes town of Coutts Crossing near Grafton, the distinctive mountain outside the town of Urbenville known as Coutts Crown, and the Coutts Water stream near Ebor. In 2018, a vote was taken by the residents of Coutts Crossing to rename their town to avoid being associated with Thomas Coutts. The residents overwhelmingly decided to retain Coutts Crossing as the town's title.
