= Behn River =

River in Western Australia

Coordinates: 16°23′36″S 128°51′6″E

Location
- Country: Australia

Physical characteristics
- Source
  - elevation: 148 metres (486 ft)
- Mouth
  - location: Lake Argyle
  - elevation: 87 metres (285 ft)
- Length: 66 km (41 mi)

The Behn River or Behm River is a river in the Kimberley region of Western Australia.

The river rises on the Northern Territory and Western Australia border. The river then flows in a north-easterly direction through Behn Gorge and discharges into Lake Argyle. The tributary with the Ord River was the site of the original Argyle Downs homestead. Both the original tributary and the Argyle homestead site are now under the waters of Lake Argyle.

The river has one major tributary; Bell Creek.

The river was named on 7 August 1879 by Alexander Forrest, who was exploring the area at the time. Forrest's journal on 7 August 1879 records.

This river I called the Behn after Dr. Behn of Gotha,-successor to Petermann, and who co-operated with that gentleman for many years in his researches towards the advancement of Australian scientific geography.

It was later determined that the river was really named after Ernst Behm, the renowned German geographer. The name on maps produced after 1996 have been corrected.

Although maps have been corrected it is still known locally in the Kimberley region as the Behn River.

The headwaters of what has become known as the Behn River are close to the NT/WA border in what Alexander Forrest named the Sonder Pass in his journal.

The Sonder Pass was the headwaters of two rivers, one to the west and one to the east. The river Forrest had named the Behn River was in fact the river flowing to the east on the NT side of the Sonder Pass, which had already been named as the West Baines River by the 1855 Augustus Charles Gregory – North Australian Expedition. Early settlers misinterpreted what Forrest had written and so the unnamed river to the west has become known as the Behn River by name. To fully understand this read Forrest's journals.
