= Bush tomato =

Solanum species native to Australia

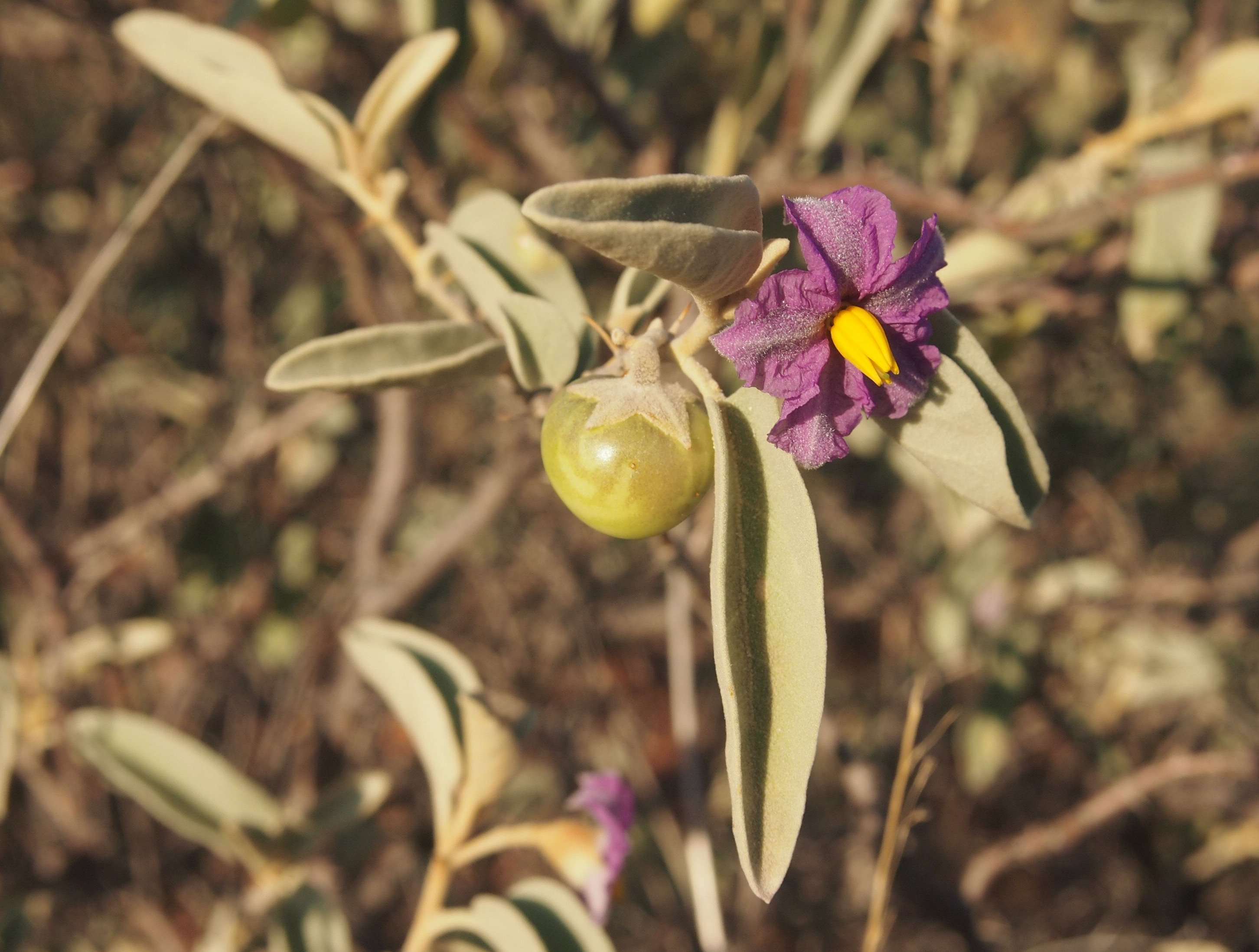
Bush tomato (fruit)

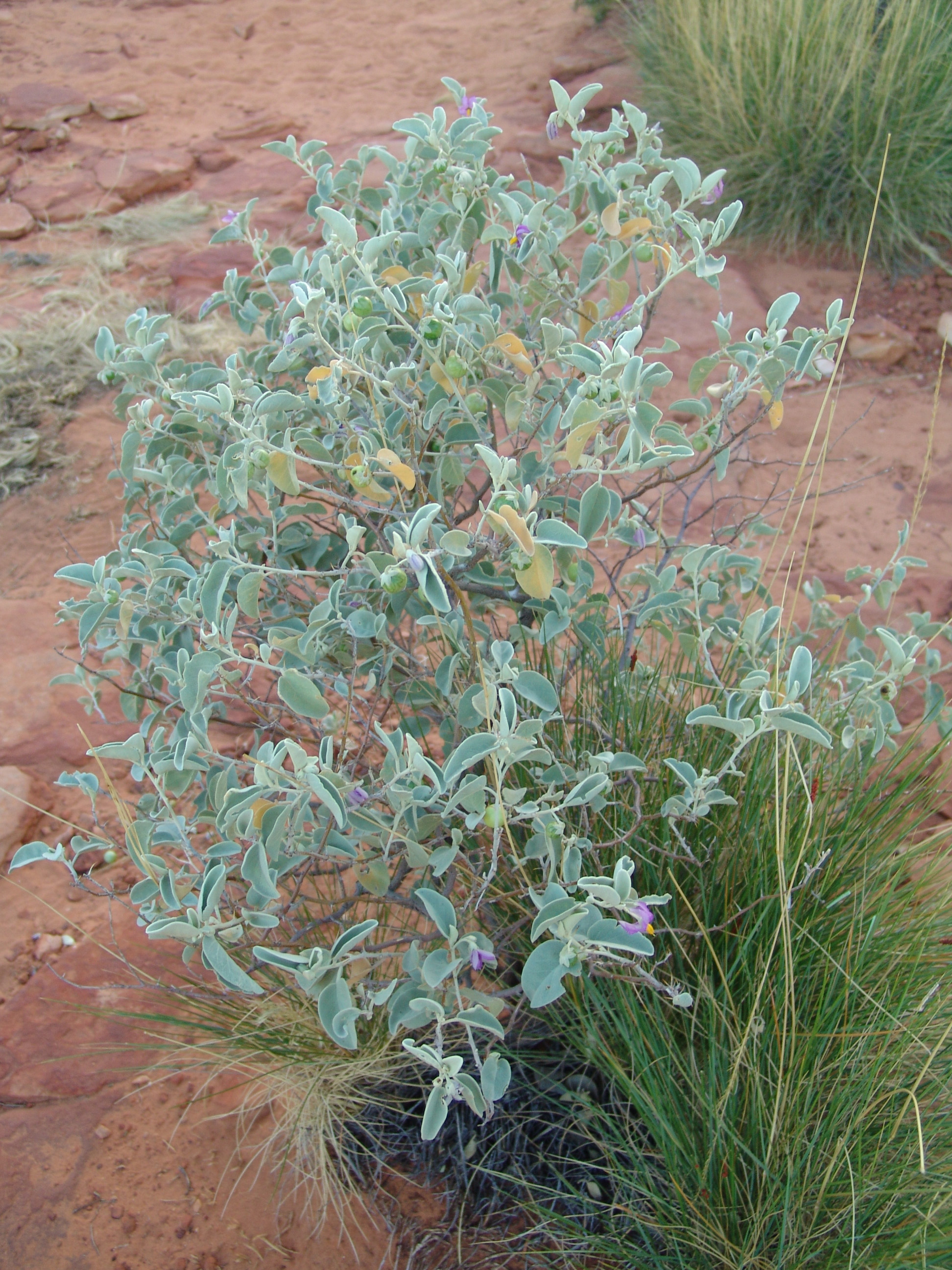
Bush tomato plant

Bush tomatoes are the fruit or entire plants of certain nightshade (Solanum) species native to the more arid parts of Australia. While they are quite closely related to tomatoes (Solanum lycopersicum), they might be even closer relatives of the eggplant (S. melongena), which they resemble in many details. There are 94 (mostly perennial) natives and 31 (mostly annual) introduced species in Australia.

Bush tomato plants are small shrubs whose growth is encouraged by fire and disturbance.

The fruit of a number of species have been used as food sources by Aboriginal people in the drier areas of Australia.

A number of Solanum species contain significant levels of solanine and as such are highly poisonous. It is strongly recommended that people unfamiliar with the plant do not experiment with the different species, as differentiating between them can often be difficult.

Some of the edible species are:

- Solanum aviculare kangaroo apple
- Solanum centrale, also known as desert raisin, bush raisin or bush sultana, or by the native name kutjera
- Solanum chippendalei bush tomato, named after taxonomic botanist George Chippendale
- Solanum diversiflorum bush tomato, karlumbu, pilirta, wamurla
- Solanum ellipticum potato bush, very similar to Solanum quadriloculatum which is poisonous.
- Solanum laciniatum kangaroo apple.
- Solanum orbiculatum round-leaved solanum
- Solanum phlomoides wild tomato.

In 1859, Aboriginal people were observed burning off the outer skin of S. aviculare as the raw state would blister their mouths. S. chippendalei is consumed by first splitting the fruit, scraping the centre out and eating the outer flesh as the seeds and surrounding placenta are bitter. S. diversiflorum is roasted before being eaten or dried. Fruit of S.orbiculatum is edible, but the fruit of the large leafed form may be bitter. Fruit of S. phlomoides appears to be edible after the removal of seeds and roasting or sundrying.

Solanum aviculare contains solasodine, a steroid used in the manufacture of oral contraceptives. Solanum plastisexum, a rare species first described in 2019, is distinguished among plants for exhibiting "breeding system fluidity" – that is, it has no stable sexual expression.
