= Tanisha Williams =

American botanist

Tanisha Marie Williams
- Born: Washington D.C.
- Education: Pennsylvania State University; California State University, Los Angeles; University of Connecticut
- Scientific career
- Workplaces: Bucknell University; University of Georgia
- Thesis: Predicting Pelargonium Responses to Climate Change in a Biodiversity Hotspot throughout South Africa (2019)
- Doctoral advisor: Kent E. Holsinger, Carl D. Schlichting
- Author abbrev. (botany): T.M.Williams
- Website: naturesplasticity.weebly.com

Tanisha Marie Williams is an American botanist and the founder of #BlackBotanistsWeek. Williams created the hashtag in 2020 as an initiative to promote Black botanists and to share their work and life experiences on social media. She was inspired after seeing similar initiatives for Black scientists in other fields. Williams' doctoral work focused on predicting plant adaptability to climate change, specifically plants in the Pelargonium genus in the Cape Floristic Region of South Africa.

== Early life and education ==
Williams was born and raised in Washington, D.C. She credits childhood hiking and camping trips, as well as the influence of her great-grandmother, Grace Alice Hawkins, for her early interest in nature and plants. Williams received a bachelor's degree from Pennsylvania State University in Energy Business and Finance in the Energy and Mineral Engineering Department in 2007. She completed a master's degree at California State University at Los Angeles in 2012. Williams worked as a graduate student in the Department of Ecology and Evolutionary Biology at the University of Connecticut and received a PhD in 2019.

== Career ==
=== Academia ===
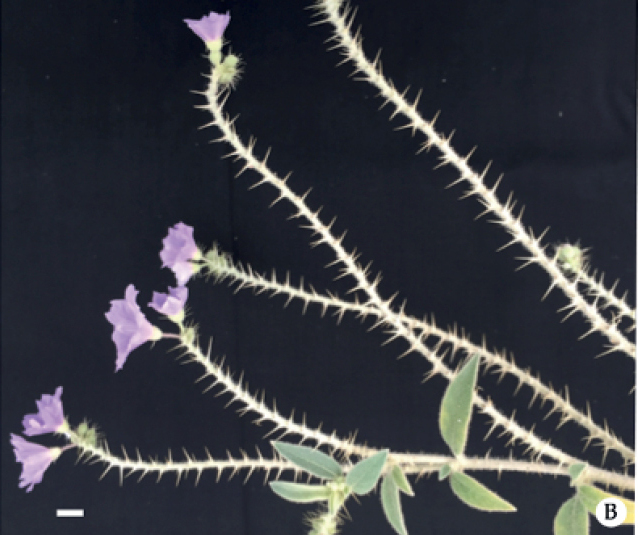
Male flowers of Solanum scalarium

Williams' master's advisor inspired her to academically pursue botany. At California State University at Los Angeles, Williams investigated gene flow and hybridization between three species of Populus in California and Nevada. For her doctoral research, she studied plant adaptability to climate change, and the ability to predict plant adaptability to climate change, focusing on plants in the Pelargonium genus growing in the Cape Floristic Region in South Africa. There, she spent two years as a Fulbright scholar and Alumni Ambassador. She performed this research in the Department of Ecology and Evolutionary Biology at the University of Connecticut, where she was the recipient of a Bridge to the Doctorate Fellowship as well as a UConn's Outstanding Multicultural Scholars Program (OMSP) fellowship. Overall, she spent four years in South Africa. She worked at and operated a research garden at Kirstenbosch National Botanical Garden, and conducted research at the University of Cape Town and the Cape Peninsula University of Technology.

Williams' post-doctoral work has focused on multiple projects, including investigations into biogeographic barriers on species distribution, population genomics to determine the conservation status of plants, and how the relationship between the Martu people of Australia and the plants that they use affect the movement of plant material in the region of that the Martu live in.

In 2020, Williams spoke to the Washington Post about the effects of climate change on tree species and leaf colors. She also appeared on NPR to explain how leaves change color, and opened the field of botany to anyone who loves plants. In 2021, Williams was a David Burpee Postdoc Fellow in Botany at Bucknell University. That year, Williams received the Peter Raven Award from the American Society of Plant Taxonomists for her efforts in scientific outreach. She was co-advisor on the plant-bee project at Bucknell, studying the relationship between the white alumroot (Heuchera alba) and the alumroot cellophane bee (Colletes aestivalis).

In 2022, she studied plant population dynamics and genomics in northern Australia. That year, Williams and botanist Chris Martine described Solanum scalarium, a new species of tomato plant from Australia. It is known from one location in Judbarra/Gregory National Park. Williams brought specimens back from Australia to Bucknell and successfully propagated seeds in a greenhouse. She was the lead author of the publication describing the species. Williams and Martine were awarded a grant by the Department of Conservation and Natural Resources to study "plant species of concern".

In 2023, Williams was awarded the Bicentenary Medal of the Linnean Society, which acknowledged her "excellent biological research and contribution to the wider natural history community". She was nominated by botanists Sandra Knapp and Chris Martine. In August 2023, Williams was hired by the University of Georgia as an assistant professor and director of the University of Georgia Herbarium.

=== Activism ===
Williams created #BlackBotanistsWeek, an initiative started in 2020 promoting Black botanists to share their work and life experiences on Twitter and Instagram after seeing similar initiatives for Black scientists in other fields. She explained, "I participated in Black Birders Week and felt a sense of joy. It was nice seeing so many Black people enjoy nature, hiking, and birding. I wanted to bring that joy and representation to the botanical fields." Williams recruited a group of co-founders and co-organizers including Beronda Montgomery and Nokwanda Makunga and as part of the first week, commemorated the late Lynika Strozier. On the first day of the event, the hashtag was used over 3,000 times.

Williams and the other members of the #BlackBotanistsWeek committee plan on #BlackBotanistsWeek being an annual event, and have already worked with the Holden Arboretum to put on a lecture series focusing on Black botanists; "Growing Black Roots: The Black Botanical Legacy". In addition to promoting Black botanists to share through social media, the response to #BlackBotanistsWeek also led to new initiatives in other botanical societies - including a Zoom mixer for BIPOC botanists at the 2020 Botanical Society of America conference.

Williams has spoken up about how Black scientists are perceived while conducting fieldwork, and explained her own precautions before going to work: "I’ve been quizzed by random strangers," she said. "Now I bring my wildflower books and botanical field guides, trying to look like a scientist. It’s for other people. I wouldn’t otherwise lug these books."

== Awards ==
- 2015-2016 Fulbright scholarship
- 2013-2015 Bridge to the Doctorate Fellowship
- 2012-2019 UConn's Outstanding Multicultural Scholars Fellowship
- 2021 Peter Raven Award from the American Society of Plant Taxonomists
- 2023 Bicentenary Medal of the Linnean Society

== Selected publications ==
- Williams, Tanisha M.; Bleau, Jade; Allen, Maya L.; Seamans, Georgia Silvera; Cannon, Brandi; Fontaine, Natasza; Halane, Morgan; Koopman, Rupert; Makunga, Nokwanda P.; Moroenyane, Itumeleng; Soto, Tatyana; Montgomery, Beronda L. (February 2021). "Growing a Community: The Inaugural #Blackbotanistsweek Recap and Looking Forward". Taxon. 70 (1): 219–222. doi:10.1002/tax.12442. ISSN 0040-0262. S2CID 234060321.
- Williams, Tanisha Marie, "Predicting Pelargonium Responses to Climate Change in a Biodiversity Hotspot throughout South Africa" (2019). Doctoral Dissertations. 2257.
- Williams, Tanisha Marie. Auer, Carol. "Ploidy Number for Panicum virgatum (switchgrass) from the Long Island Sound Coastal Lowland compared to Upland and Lowland Cultivars" 2014. Open Commons UConn.
- Williams, Tanisha Marie, "Discovering the next-generation of hybrids: evidence from high-throughput SNP assays that three species of Populus lack significant reproductive barriers" (2012). Theses, California State University, Los Angeles
