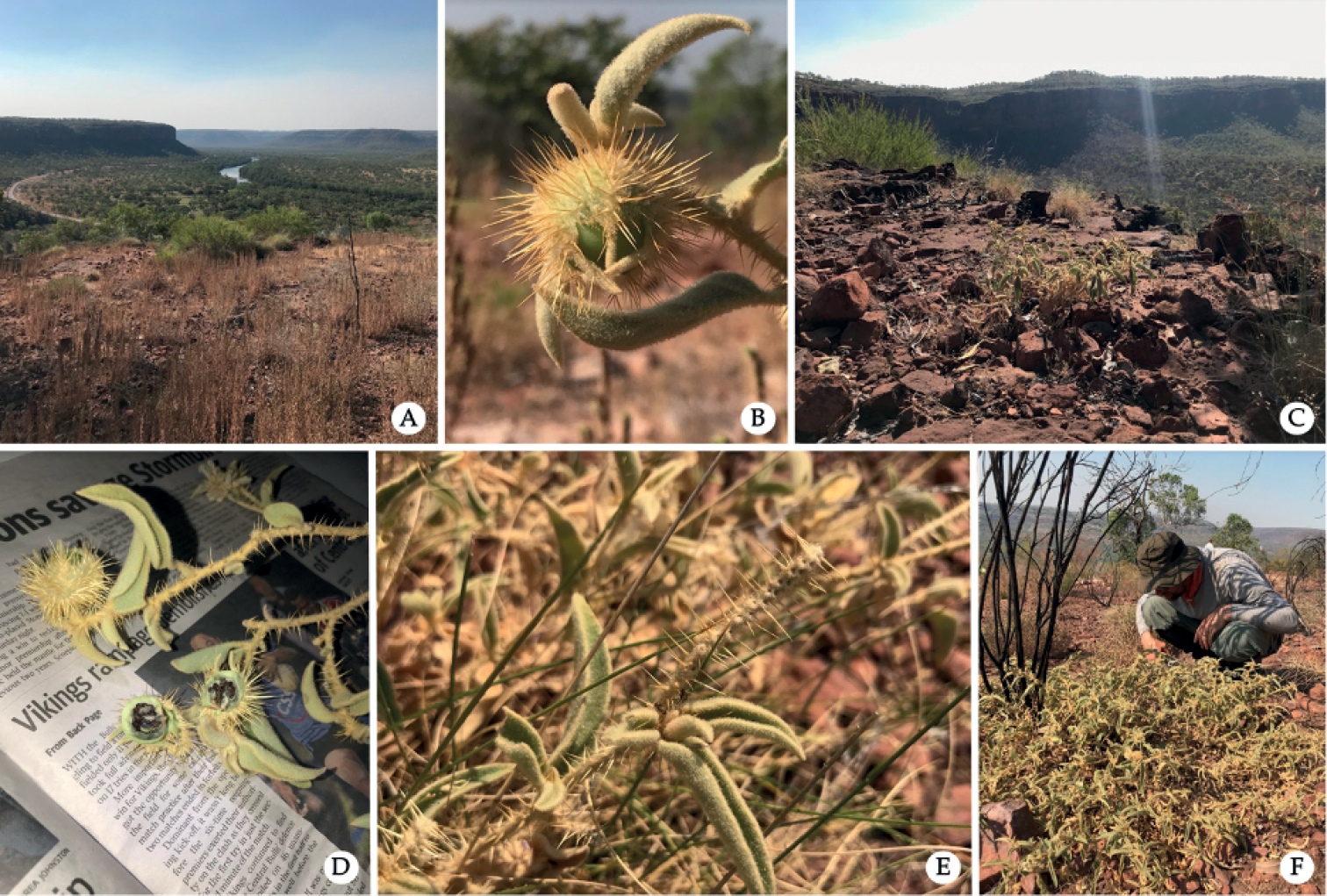

Scientific classification
- Kingdom: Plantae
- Clade: Tracheophytes
- Clade: Angiosperms
- Clade: Eudicots
- Clade: Asterids
- Order: Solanales
- Family: Solanaceae
- Genus: Solanum
- Species: S. scalarium

Binomial name
- Solanum scalarium Martine & T.M.Williams

= Solanum scalarium =

Species of plant

Solanum scalarium, known as the Garrarnawun bush tomato, is a species of plant native to the Garrarnawun Lookout in Judbarra/Gregory National Park, Australia. The species was first collected in 2018, and was formally described by botanists Christopher Martine and Tanisha Williams in 2022.

== Description ==
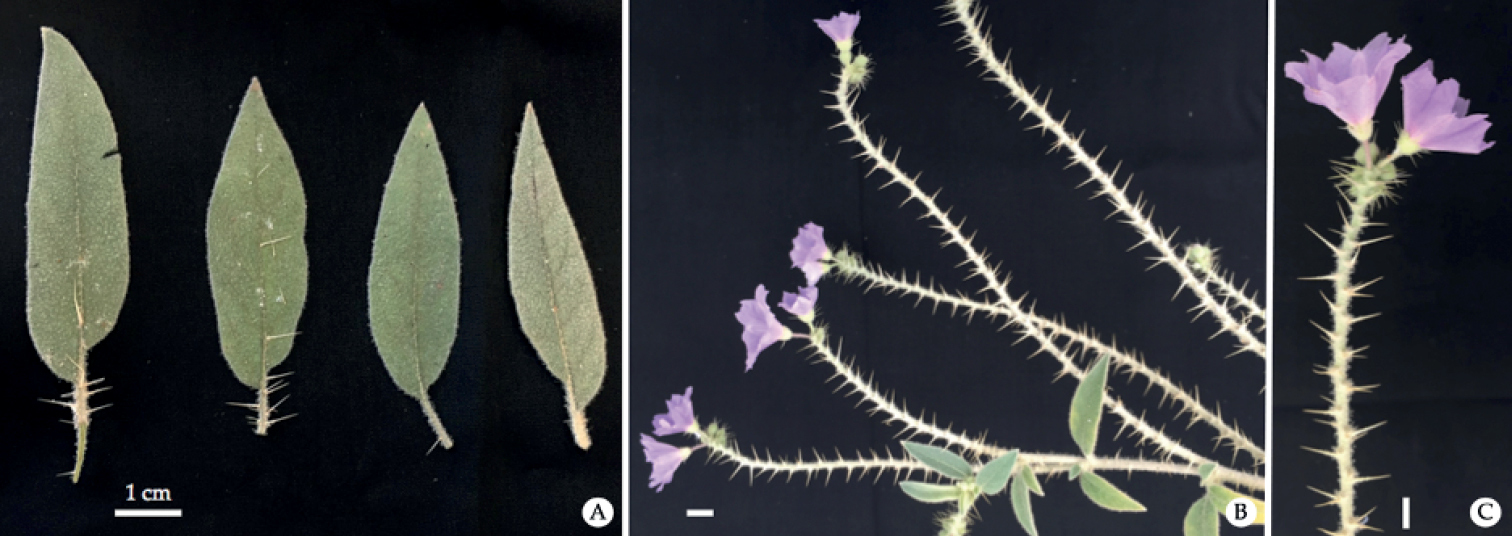
Functionally male individuals of Solanum scalarium in cultivation

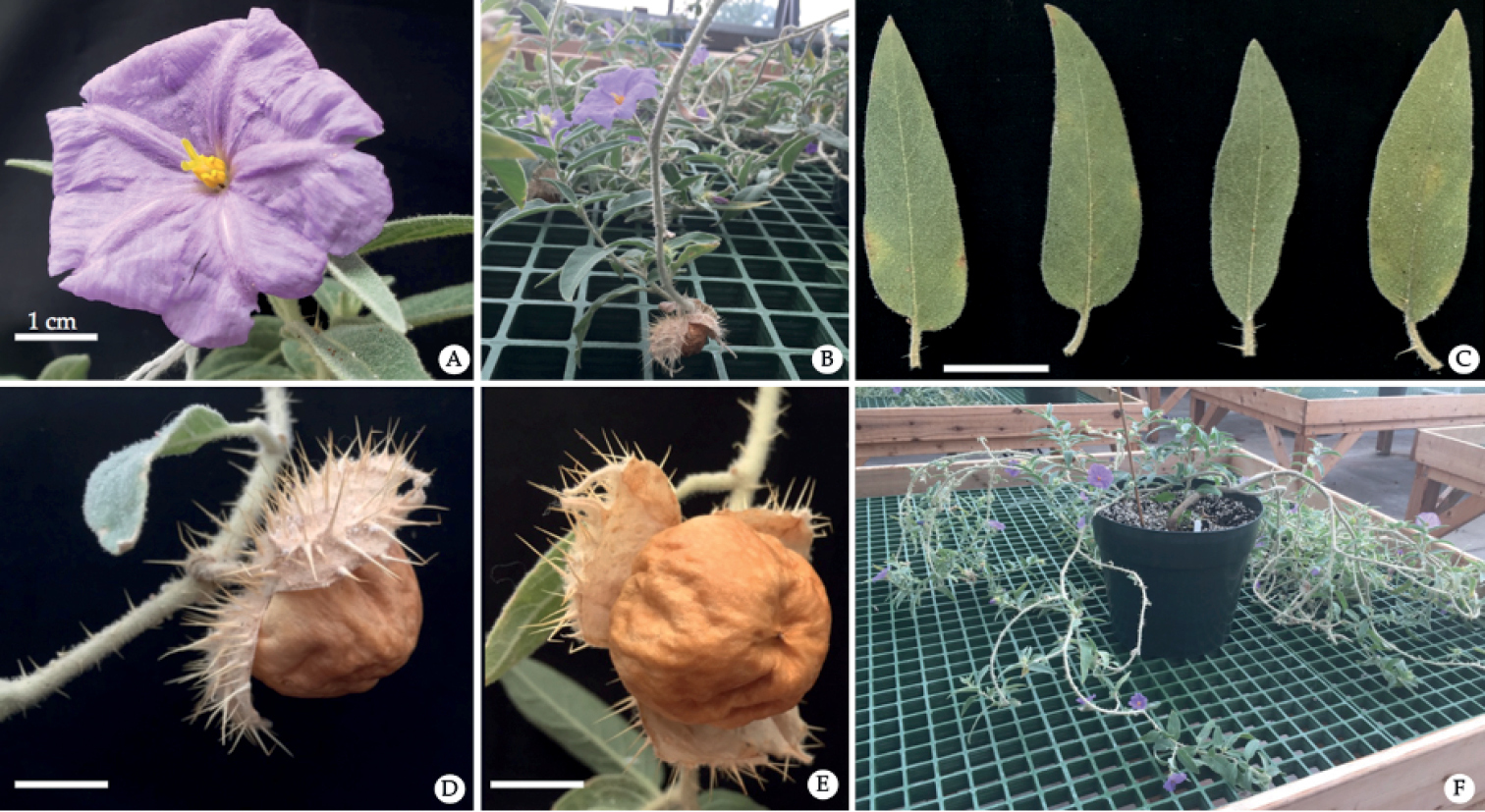
Functionally female individuals of Solanum scalarium in cultivation

The species was described using plants cultivated from seeds in a greenhouse. It is distinct for its creeping growth habit and the prickles that grow on the flowering stems, which resemble a ladder. The specific epithet "scalarium" refers to the Latin word for "ladder".

S. scalarium is a perennial spreading decumbent pale green shrub up to 30 cm tall. The main stem can grow between 4–12 cm tall, is woody and may branch 2–4 times. Younger stems yellow-green to tan-green in color and older woody stems eventually becoming dark tan or gray. Leaves are simple with blades 5–9 cm long, 1–3 cm wide, alternate, and lanceolate. They are soft yellow green above, slightly lighter beneath, both sides densely hairy.

The male inflorescence is a scorpioid cyme 9–24 mm long with up to 50 flowers (typically 1–4 flowers) open at a time with previous blooms abscised. Flowers are pale violet. The female inflorescence of a solitary, morphologically cosexual flower (functionally female and producing inaperturate pollen). The flowers are violet to pale violet. The fruit is a berry, 20–25 mm diameter, green and fleshy when immature. The mature fruit is light green, drying to yellow-orange or tan, becoming leathery-reticulate and bony hard. Seeds are dark brown to black.

== Habitat and ecology ==
The species is only known from one population of an estimated 50-100 individuals. It grows on exposed rock and skeletal soils.

Pollination biology of the species is unknown, but, like other Australian relatives, the flowers are likely buzz pollinated by bees in the genera Xylocopa and Amegilla. They are likely to present high levels of pollen nutritional reward – although with slightly differential rewards available to pollen foragers from male versus functionally female flowers.

Seed dispersal mechanism for this species is also unknown. It is suggested that the species typically flowers early in the calendar year.

== Taxonomy ==
The species is part of the Kimberley dioecious clade, a group of related functionally dioecious species of Solanum in Australia. It is closely related to other bush tomato species such as Solanum plastisexum and Solanum watneyi.
