= Makunga =

Makunga may refer to:

- Makunga, a fictional lion antagonist in Madagascar: Escape 2 Africa
- Nokwanda Makunga, South African biotechnologist
- Nwabisa Makunga (born 1982), South African journalist
- W Morung Makunga (born 1952), Indian politician
