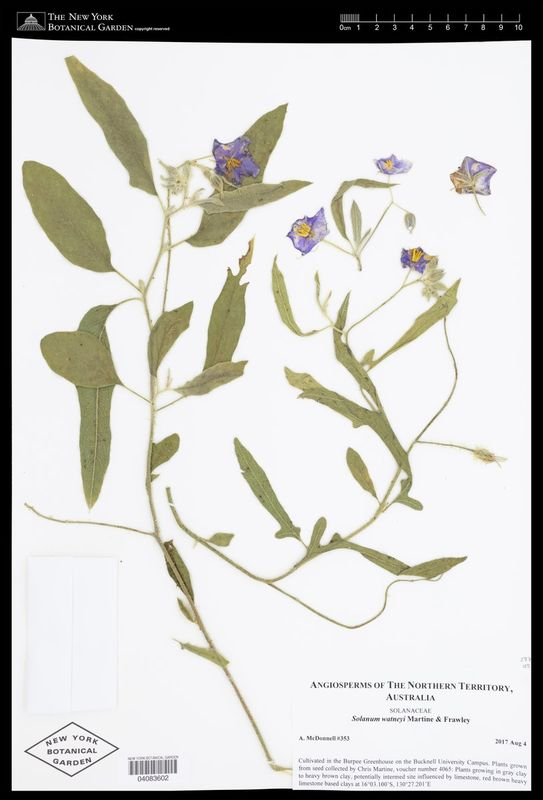

Scientific classification
- Kingdom: Plantae
- Clade: Embryophytes
- Clade: Tracheophytes
- Clade: Angiosperms
- Clade: Eudicots
- Clade: Asterids
- Order: Solanales
- Family: Solanaceae
- Genus: Solanum
- Species: S. watneyi

Binomial name
- Solanum watneyi Martine & Frawley

= Solanum watneyi =

Species of flowering plant

Solanum watneyi is a species of flowering plant in the family Solanaceae. It is a sub-shrub with purple flowers, yellow berries, and brown seeds. The species is native to Australia's Northern Territory, and was described in 2016.

Solanum watneyi is named after Mark Watney, a fictional botanist from The Martian.

== Taxonomy ==
The species was described by Christopher T. Martine and Emma S. Frawley in 2016. The holotype was collected in Judbarra / Gregory National Park.

Solanum watneyi is part of the subgenus Leptostemonum. It is closely related to Solanum eburneum, Solanum chippendalei, and Solanum jobsonii. Solanum watneyi is partially sympatric with S. eburneum, and the two species may be able to hybridise.

S. watneyi was formerly recognised as a variant of S. eburneum, and known as "Solanum sp. "Bullita"".

== Distribution ==
Solanum watneyi is native to Australia's Northern Territory. It grows in open Eucalyptus woodlands and sub-arid environments, at elevations of 100–150 metres (330–490 ft). The species has been collected from well-drained limestone soils.

== Description ==
Solanum watneyi is a sub-shrub that grows 50–60 centimetres (20–24 in) high. The stems are slender and woody. The stems have sparse, straw-coloured prickles, which are 2–5 millimetres (0.079–0.197 in) long. The leaf stems are 3–3.5 centimetres (1.2–1.4 in) long. The leaves are arranged alternately, lanceolate-elliptic in shape, 12–16 centimetres (4.7–6.3 in) long, and 2–6 centimetres (0.79–2.36 in) wide.

The inflorescence has a stem around 2.5 millimetres (0.098 in) long. The inflorescence is a 9–11 centimetres (3.5–4.3 in) cyme, which has both male and hermaphroditic flowers. The corolla is pale or dusty purple, and has undulating margins. Flowering specimens have been collected from March to May. The flowers are likely to be buzz pollinated.

The corolla of hermaphroditic flowers is 4–5 centimetres (1.6–2.0 in) in diameter, and the calyx lobes are 5–8 millimetres (0.20–0.31 in) long. The hermaphroditic flowers grow on 2–3 centimetres (0.79–1.18 in) stems, and open before the male flowers. The corolla of male flowers is around 2.5–4.5 centimetres (0.98–1.77 in) in diameter, and the calyx lobes are 7–8 millimetres (0.28–0.31 in) long. The male flowers grow on 15–16 millimetres (0.59–0.63 in) long stems.

The fruit is an ellipsoid berry, which is firm, and dry inside when mature. The fruits ripen from pale green with dark green stripes to lemon yellow with faint brown stripes. The fruits are 2–2.5 centimetres (0.79–0.98 in) long, and 1.5–2.2 centimetres (0.59–0.87 in) wide. The fruits grow on or near the ground, on stems around 4.22 centimetres (1.66 in) long. Fruiting specimens have been collected from April to June.

Each fruit has two locules, and up to around 100 seeds. Mature seeds are tan to dark brown, and 2.5–3.5 millimetres (0.098–0.138 in) long. Seed dispersal is likely to be biotic.

== Etymology ==
The species is named after Mark Watney, a fictional botanist from The Martian. The name was inspired by the reddish ("Mars-like") soils of the species' habitat, and potatoes (Solanum tuberosum), which Watney grows on Mars. Watney was described as "perhaps the finest paean to botanical science (and botanical field work) that Hollywood has yet presented".

Andy Weir, the author of The Martian, approved of the name.

== See also ==
- List of organisms named after works of fiction
