= Quena (disambiguation) =

Quena may refer to:

- Quena, the flute-like musical instrument
- The telenovela director María Eugenia Rencoret
- The common name of the plant Solanum esuriale

Not to be confused with:

- Qena, a city in Egypt
