= Prickly nightshade =

Prickly nightshade can refer to:

- Solanum torvum
- Solanum petrophilum
