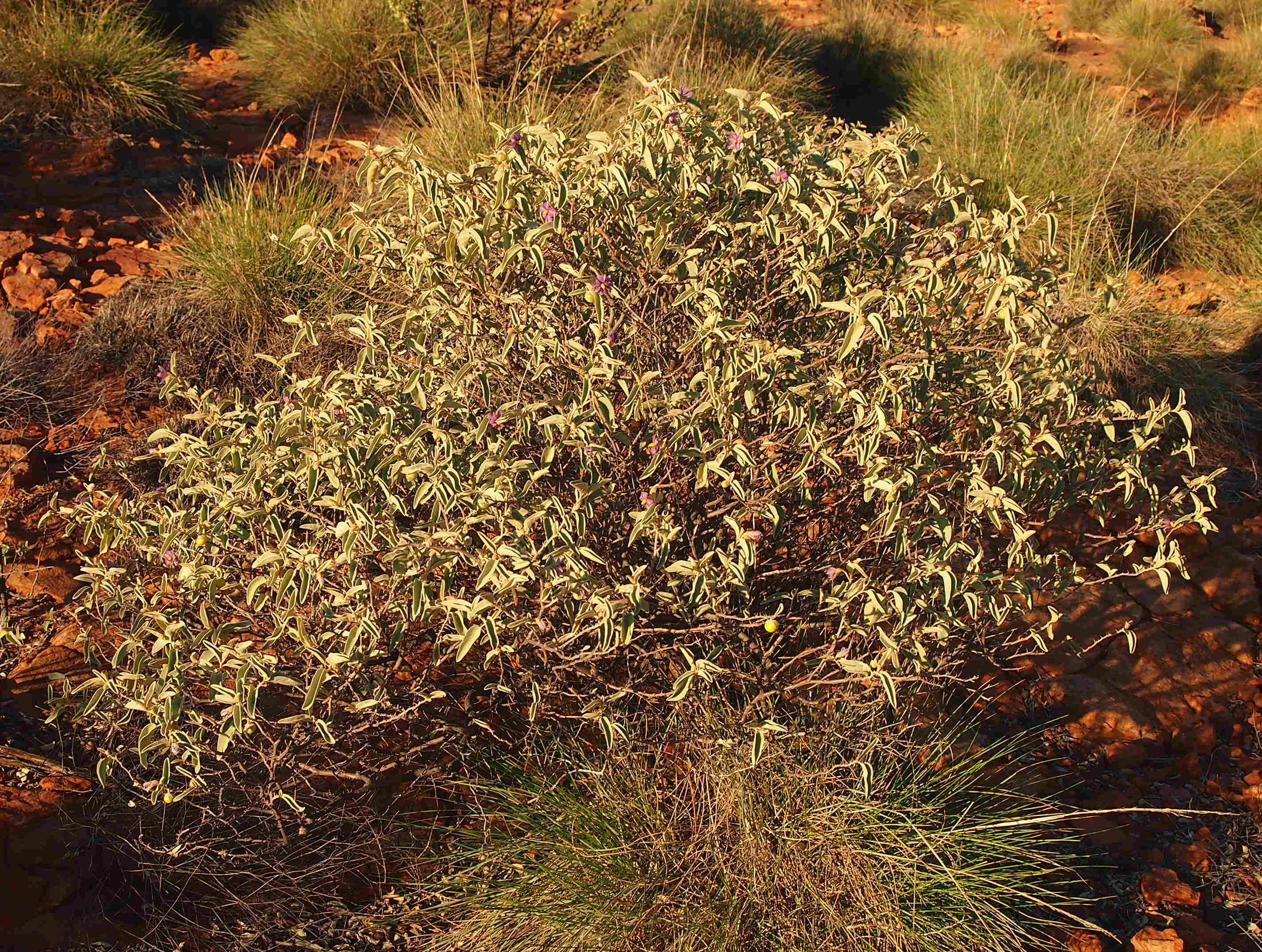

Scientific classification
- Kingdom: Plantae
- Clade: Tracheophytes
- Clade: Angiosperms
- Clade: Eudicots
- Clade: Asterids
- Order: Solanales
- Family: Solanaceae
- Genus: Solanum
- Species: S. ellipticum

Binomial name
- Solanum ellipticum F.Muell.

Synonyms
- See text

= Solanum ellipticum =

Species of plant

Solanum ellipticum is known as potato bush and under the more ambiguous name of "bush tomato". The Arrernte name of merne awele-awele might refer to this species or to the similar S. quadriloculatum. Native to Australia, the potato bush is a small fruiting shrub in the family Solanaceae.

Solanum ellipticum was described by F. von Mueller. The plant named thus by J.M. de Conceição Vellozo is actually S. cylindricum.

It a small fast-growing waxy-looking shrub that grows next to creeks. It fruits prolifically the year after fire or good rains. Its fruit have a pungent smell, and the plant can be smelled from some distance away when the fruit are ripe. Like the other "bush tomatoes", S. ellipticum fruit are edible raw or cooked.

Solanum ellipticum used to (and in some treatments still does) include S. quadriloculatum as variety duribaccalis, but generally these two species of "bush tomatoes" are considered distinct nowadays. Similarly, the former variety horridum is now S. senticosum, the S. echinatum of Robert Brown was sometimes treated as var. pannifolium, and S. esuriale was included in S. ellipticum as form inermis.

A few now-invalid names for S. ellipticum also exist; mostly they refer to potatobush plants believed to be distinct forms or varieties but today not considered to be taxonomically distinct:

- Solanum ellipticum f. albiflora Domin (lapsus)
- Solanum ellipticum f. albiflorum Domin
- Solanum ellipticum var. chillagoense Domin
- Solanum ellipticum var. mollibaccalis J.M.Black
- Solanum lithophilum F.Muell.
- Solanum cleistogamum Symon

== See also ==
- Bushfood
