= Potato weed =

Potato weed is a common name for several plants and may refer to:

- Galinsoga parviflora, a herbaceous plant in the Asteraceae (daisy) family
- Solanum esuriale, a species of perennial herbaceous plant native to Australia
