= Nokwanda Makunga =

Professor of Biotechnology

- Education: University of KwaZulu-Natal
- Scientific career
- Workplaces: Stellenbosch University; University of Minnesota, Minneapolis

Nokwanda Pearl (Nox) Makunga is a Professor of Biotechnology at Stellenbosch University.

== Early life and education ==
Makunga grew up in Alice in the Eastern Cape, and attended a private boarding school in Grahamstown. Her father, Oswald, was a botanist who specialised in the Iridaceae. He grew up in rural poverty and won a scholarship to study at University of Fort Hare. She attended university in Pietermaritzburg. She completed her PhD at the University of KwaZulu-Natal in 2004, working on the molecular biology of plants.

== Research and career ==
In 2005 Makunga was offered a position at Stellenbosch University. Her work looks to identify the molecular and genetic regulation of the secondary metabolism in medicinal plants. She often travels to rural areas to talk to traditional healers. She has a contributed to two books: Protocols for Somatic Embryogenesis in Woody plants and Floriculture, Ornamental and Plant Biotechnology: Advances and Topical Issues. In 2010 she delivered a TED talk on the Potential of a Medicinal Wonderland. She has acted as honorary secretary, Vice President and President of the South African Association of Botanists Council.

She won the 2011 National Science and Technology Forum Distinguished Young Black Researcher award. She also won the TW Kambule Award. In 2017 she was a Fulbright scholar at the University of Minnesota, Minneapolis. She worked with Jerry Cohen on medicinal plants from the Eastern Cape. She studied the Stevia plant. She holds a patent for vegetative plant propagation.

Together with Tanisha Williams and Beronda Montgomery, she leads the annual Black Botanists Week.
