= Dungowan Station =

Pastoral lease in Northern Territory, Australia

Coordinates: 16.874°S 132.252°E

Location in the Northern Territory

Dungowan Station is a pastoral lease that operates as a cattle station in the Northern Territory of Australia, approximately 511 kilometres (318 mi) south of Darwin.

The property occupies an area of 4,370 square kilometres (1,687 sq mi) and is currently owned by the Consolidated Pastoral Company. The station is run in conjunction with Newcastle Waters Station which is located 160 kilometres (99 mi) away. Over 13,000 head of cattle graze the property with approximately 5,000 claves being branded each year. It was owned in the 1980s by The Hon Charles Sweeney QC, an Australian pastoralist and later Chief Justice of Tuvalu, a major interest of whom was water security. He was a relative of Michael and Paul Vandeleur who owned Mataranka Station.

Approximately 4,000 square kilometres (1,544 sq mi) of pastoral country was burnt out by a fire that burnt for over a week. A large portion of Dungowan Station, most of Birrimba Station, some of Murranjai and a little of Killarney Station were burnt out.

The rare and sexually fluid bush tomato Solanum plastisexum ("Dungowan bush tomato") grows nearby.

== See also ==
- List of ranches and stations
