= Gregory's Tree Historical Reserve =

Protected area in Northern Territory, Australia

Coordinates: 15.566193°S 130.366158°E

Gregory's tree (Boab) at Victoria River, in the 1890s

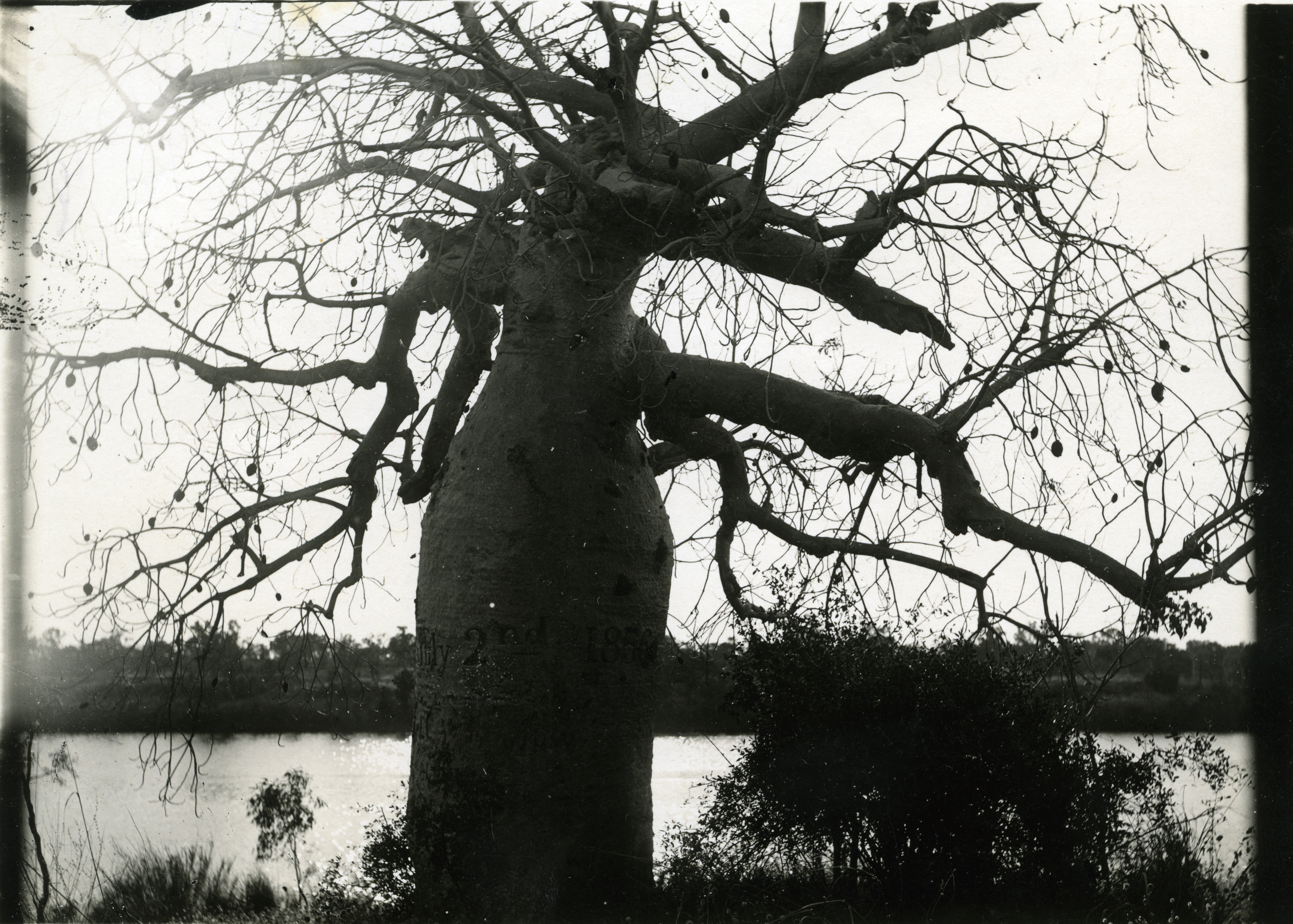
Gregory's tree, 1900

Gregory's Tree Historical Reserve is a protected area in the Northern Territory of Australia and it is situated within the Judbarra / Gregory National Park and is 15 kilometres (9.3 mi) north-west of Timber Creek and on the Victoria Highway and is a registered heritage site. The reserve is a small one consisting of 2 hectares (4.9 acres).

Gregory's tree itself is a boab tree (Adansonia gregorii) which is sacred to the Ngarinman people who know it as Ngalibinggag (pronounced: Nali-la-bing-gag); for this reason it is also registered as a sacred site.

A permanent declaration placing it on the Northern Territory Heritage Register made on 1 March 1995.

== History ==
Gregory's Tree, which the reserve encapsulates, was named for Augustus Charles Gregory when he was the leader of the North Australia Expedition in 1855–1856 and it marks an area where he camped. The dates of these camps, 13 October 1855 and 2 July 1856, is inscribed into the tree trunk and where designed to serve as a marker of their expedition; in case they came into trouble.

The species of tree was also named and first described by Ferdinand von Mueller, the botanist for the expedition, in honour of Gregory.
