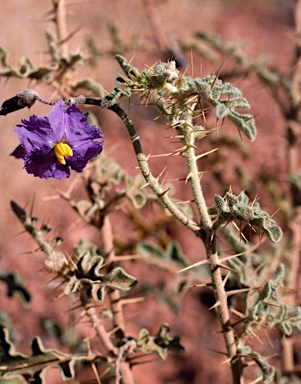

Scientific classification
- Kingdom: Plantae
- Clade: Tracheophytes
- Clade: Angiosperms
- Clade: Eudicots
- Clade: Asterids
- Order: Solanales
- Family: Solanaceae
- Genus: Solanum
- Species: S. petrophilum

Binomial name
- Solanum petrophilum F.Muell.
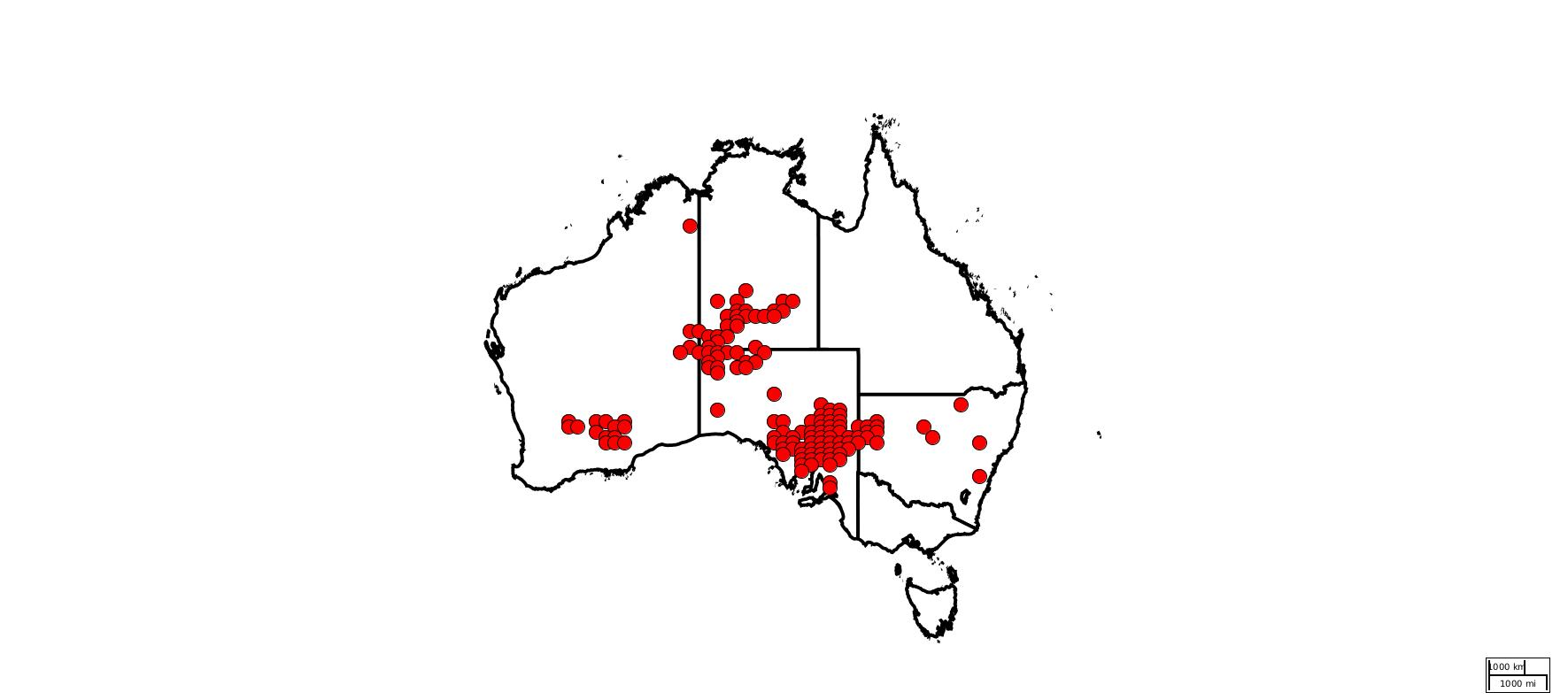
- Occurrence data from AVH

= Solanum petrophilum =

Rock nightshade

Species of plant

Solanum petrophilum, commonly known as rock nightshade or prickly nightshade, is an Australian native perennial herbaceous plant that belongs to the family Solanaceae. Solanaceae has a worldwide distribution and also contains important food species such as the tomato (Solanum lycopersicum), peppers (Capsicum annuum), and potatoes (Solanum tuberosum).

Solanum is a large genus in the Solanaceae family with over 100 different species in the family occurring in Australia, and a large majority of them also being native. Particularly many species occur in arid and semi-arid areas, though many also have wide distributions excluding alpine, saline and aquatic habitats.

== Description ==
Solanum petrophilum is a small many branched prickly shrub that grows between 20–60 cm (8–24 in) high, sometimes with a sprawling habit. All parts of the plant, excluding the petals, contain a sparse to moderately dense tomentum of stellate hairs, with an additional coverage of 1 cm (0.4 in) long prickles. These prickles are usually straight and vary between reddish and brownish in colour and are lesser in number compared to other species in the S. petrophilum complex.

=== Leaves ===
Solanum petrophilum leaves are 2–8 cm (0.8–3.1 in) long ovate-lanceolate to oblong in shape, usually greyish-green in colour on the upper leaf and greenish-white to grey or yellow on the lower leaf surface. The leaf margin has 3-6 undulating shallow or deep rounded lobes and has a truncate to cordate base. The prickles occur on the mid-vein of the leaf and sometimes on the mid-vein and lateral veins.

=== Flowers ===
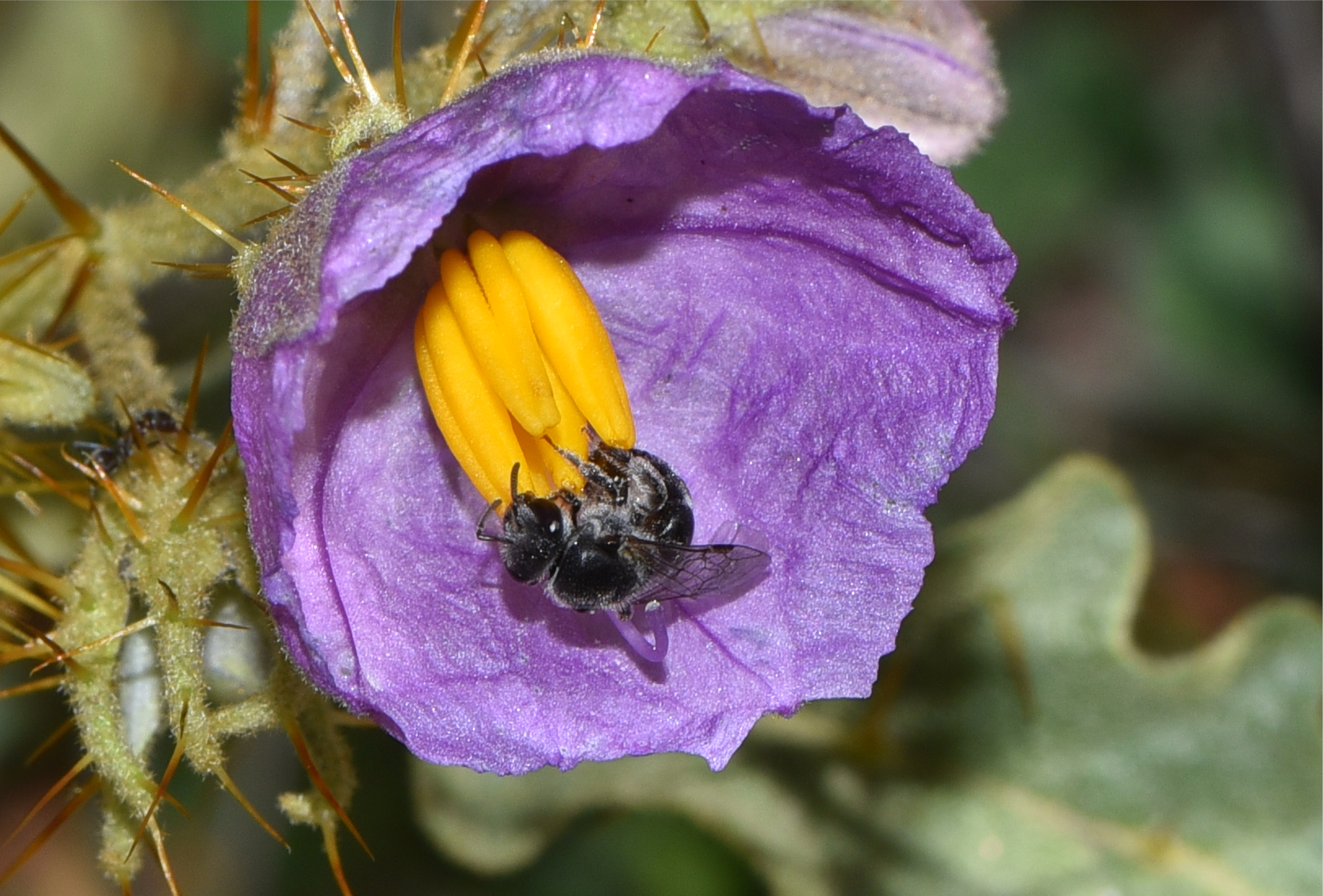
Native bee foraging on Solanum petrophilum flower

The inflorescence of S. petrophilum is a 3-10 flowered cyme, with 5–10 mm (0.2–0.4 in) long peduncles and pedicels and 50 mm (2 in) rachis. The calyx is 8–10 mm (0.31–0.39 in) long, usually with lobes 6–7 mm (0.24–0.28 in) in length. It has a purple corolla that is shallowly campanulate-rotate in shape and 25–30 mm (1.0–1.2 in) in diameter when fully open. The 4–6 mm (0.16–0.24 in) anthers are a prominent yellow and loosely erect. It primarily flowers in spring from Aug-Oct, though it can also flower year-round.

=== Fruit ===
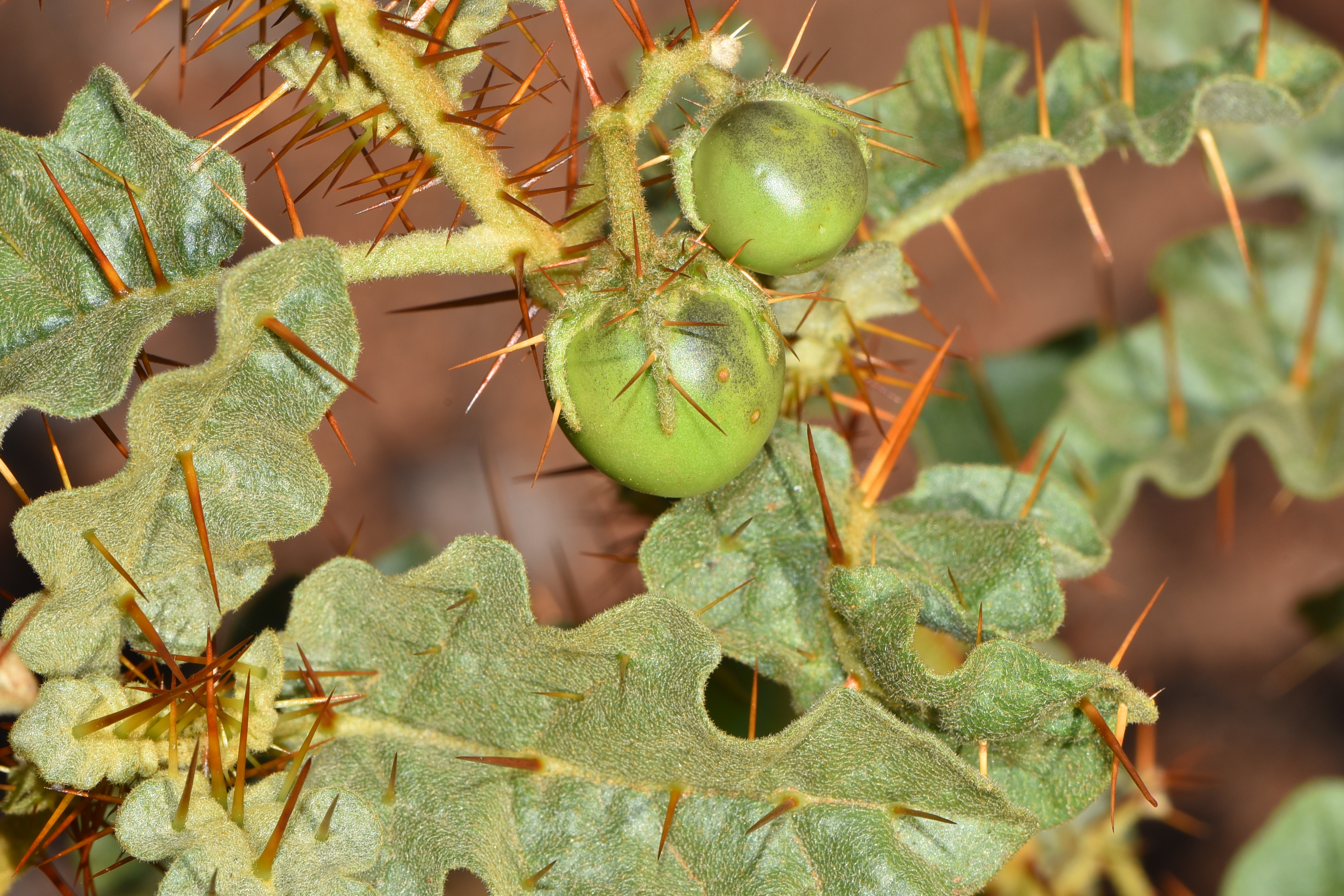
Solanum petrophilum fruit

The fruiting pedicel and peduncle are firm and connected to a 10 mm (0.4 in) calyx that has long linear lobes to enclose the globular fruit. The fruit is an 8–15 mm (0.3–0.6 in) diameter, two-celled berry that is bright green at first, yellows as it matures and finally hardens and dries to a pale bony or light brown colour. There are usually 1-3 berries per inflorescence which can often remain on the main plant for quite some time. The seeds are compressed and 1–1.5 mm (0.04–0.06 in) long and can be light-brown or grey-brown in colour.

== Distribution ==
Solanum petrophilum is widespread throughout the arid areas of inland Australia. It primarily occurs in South Australia such as the Gawler and Flinders Ranges, with some distribution in the Northern Territory, the Coolgardie area of Western Australia and the sandplain and sandstone hills of New South Wales near Broken Hill. It prefers rocky hill and outcrop habitats or near the base of ranges, but can also tolerate a variety of sites such as creek banks and undulating plains.

== Taxonomy ==
Solanum petrophilum was formally described by Ferdinand Von Mueller in 1853 after he collected specimens of the plants from the Flinders Ranges. Slight characteristic differences have been found in plants in different locations, but these have not but found significant enough to be classified as subspecies of S. petrophilum. Though there have been other species such as S. lobatum, S. osteocarpum and S. pallidifolium that are distinct enough to be classified as their own species, but similar enough to S. petrophilum to be considered as part of the S. petrophilum complex.

== Toxicity ==
The berries of S. petrophilum have long been thought to be toxic to livestock, though no clear evidence has proven this. It is likely due to the presence of toxic steroidal glycoalkaloids in the berries which can be harmful if ingested. They are a natural defence in many Solanum species against snails and insects and have the potential to suppress the germination of other competing plants. Some other Australian native Solanum species such as S. centrale are important food sources in arid Australia, though can still be toxic when unripe, but S. petrophilum is still treated with caution and avoided as a food source.

Conversely, in studies of the Yellow-footed Rock Wallabies (Petrogale xanthopus), S. petrophilum was found to be a major contributor to its diet, particularly in summer and autumn when there is more fruit present and a lower proportion of other herbs.

== Conservation status ==
Solanum petrophilum is currently not listed as a species of concern.
