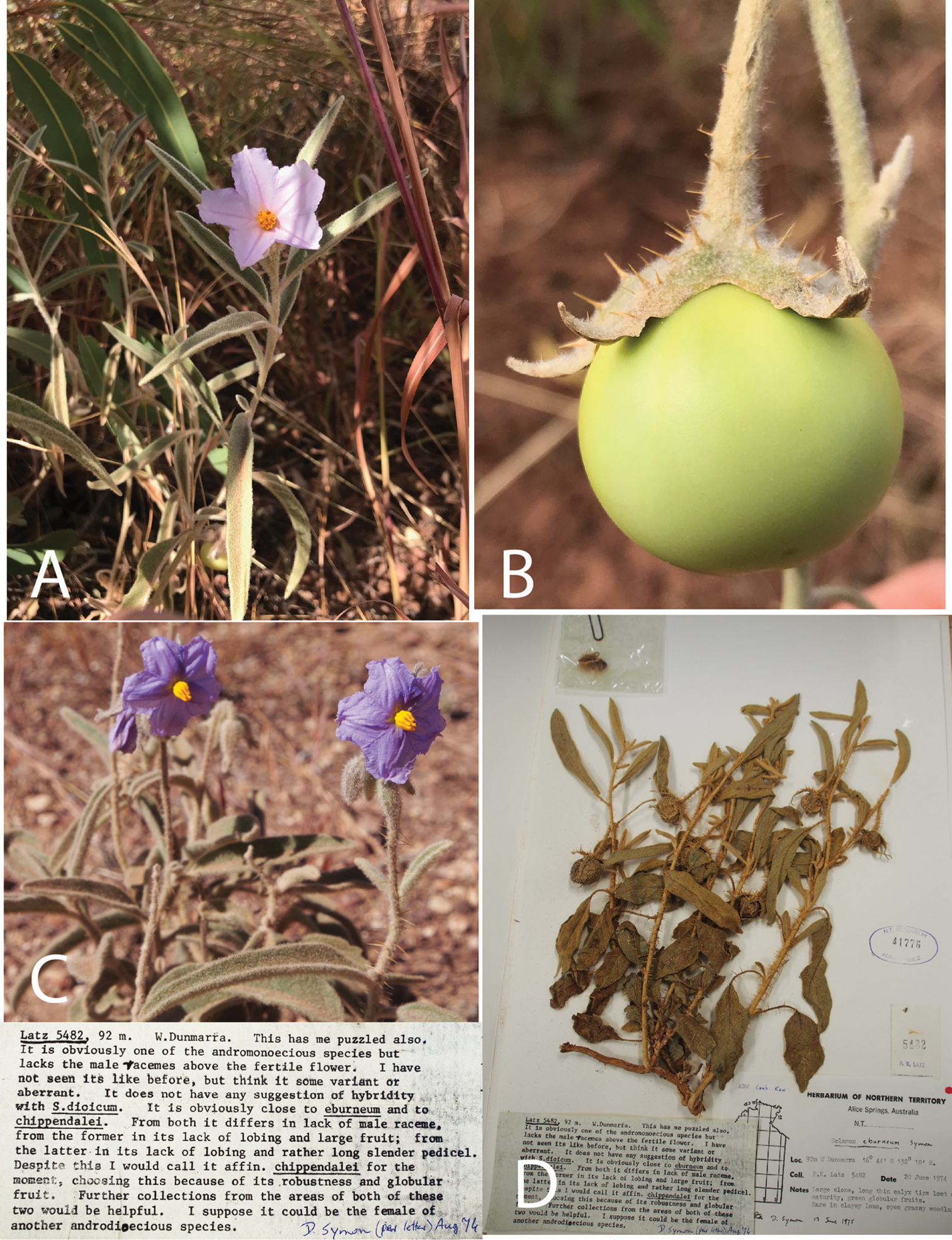
- Morphology and specimen of Solanum plastisexum

Scientific classification
- Kingdom: Plantae
- Clade: Tracheophytes
- Clade: Angiosperms
- Clade: Eudicots
- Clade: Asterids
- Order: Solanales
- Family: Solanaceae
- Genus: Solanum
- Species: S. plastisexum

Binomial name
- Solanum plastisexum Martine & McDonnell

= Solanum plastisexum =

Species of bush tomato from Australia

Solanum plastisexum is a species of bush tomato from the Australian monsoon tropics that exhibits "breeding system fluidity" – that is, it has no stable sexual expression. After its first description in 2019, the describers suggested the common name of Dungowan bush tomato, in reference to Dungowan Station where it was collected.

The species is restricted to a small area in the central region of the Northern Territory of Australia on and around the Buchanan Highway. It confounded field botanists since at least the early 1970s because it does not conform to any one floral form and/or inflorescence type. Any given plant might consist of a fully andromonoecious inflorescence, a solitary bisexual flower, a solitary short-styled flower or an extended rachis of staminate flowers. It can therefore exhibit any of three breeding systems: andromonoecy, hermaphroditism or functional dioecy.

The describers commented that Solanum plastisexum is "a new species that serves as an example of for the diversity of sexual/reproductive form that has been increasingly recognised amongst plants – it is also evidence that attempts to recognise a “normative” sexual condition amongst the planet's living creatures is problematic. When considering the scope of life on Earth, the notion of a constant sexual binary consisting of distinct and disconnected forms is, fundamentally, a fallacy."
