= Nwabisa Makunga =

South African journalist and newspaper editor

- Born: 1982 (age 43–44); Uitenhage
- Citizenship: South Africa
- Occupation: Journalist

Nwabisa Makunga (born 1982) is a South African journalist and newspaper editor. She is editor of The Sowetan.

== Life ==
Makunga was born in Uitenhage. Her mother was a high school pupil at the time, and she was raised by her paternal grandparents, a school principal and a blue collar worker in car manufacturing. As a child, she was inspired to want to become a journalist by the news presenter Noxolo Grootboom's narration of the 1993 funeral of Chris Hani.

In 2004, Makunga became a volunteer at The Herald. After six months, they employed her on a stipend contract, and a year later gave her a permanent contract. In 2016, she became deputy editor of the Herald and its Saturday publication, the Weekend Post, and in July 2018, became editor of the Herald and Weekend Post.

She left the Herald and Weekend Post at the end of February 2020, to take up a job a editor of the Sowetan on 1 March 2020. Immediately after arrival she had to cope with the impact of the COVID-19 pandemic, changing technological processes and managing the pandemic's economic and political impact on the newspaper.
