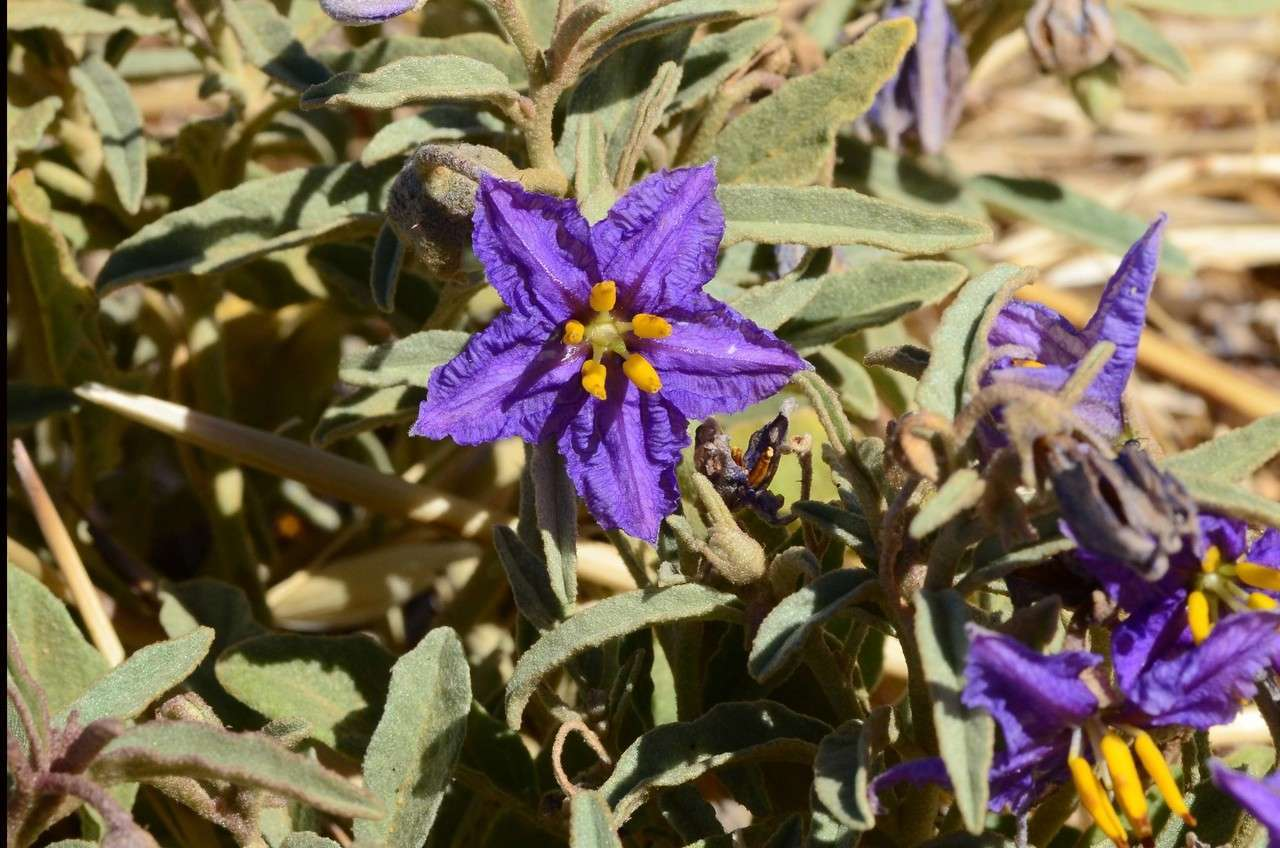

Scientific classification
- Kingdom: Plantae
- Clade: Tracheophytes
- Clade: Angiosperms
- Clade: Eudicots
- Clade: Asterids
- Order: Solanales
- Family: Solanaceae
- Genus: Solanum
- Species: S. esuriale

Binomial name
- Solanum esuriale Lindl.

= Solanum esuriale =

Native Australian plant

Solanum esuriale is a species of perennial herbaceous plant native to Australia.

== Other names ==
Most commonly called quena (may also be spelled quenna), S. esuriale is often grouped with bush tomatoes. However, it should not be confused with S. centrale, which is produced commercially under this name. It is also sometimes referred to as potato weed, or potato bush.

In the language of the Yuwaalaraay people of north-western New South Wales, quena is called bulumburr. In Nyangumarta, the traditional owners of a region of north Western Australia, the plant is known as jinyjiwirrily.

== Description ==
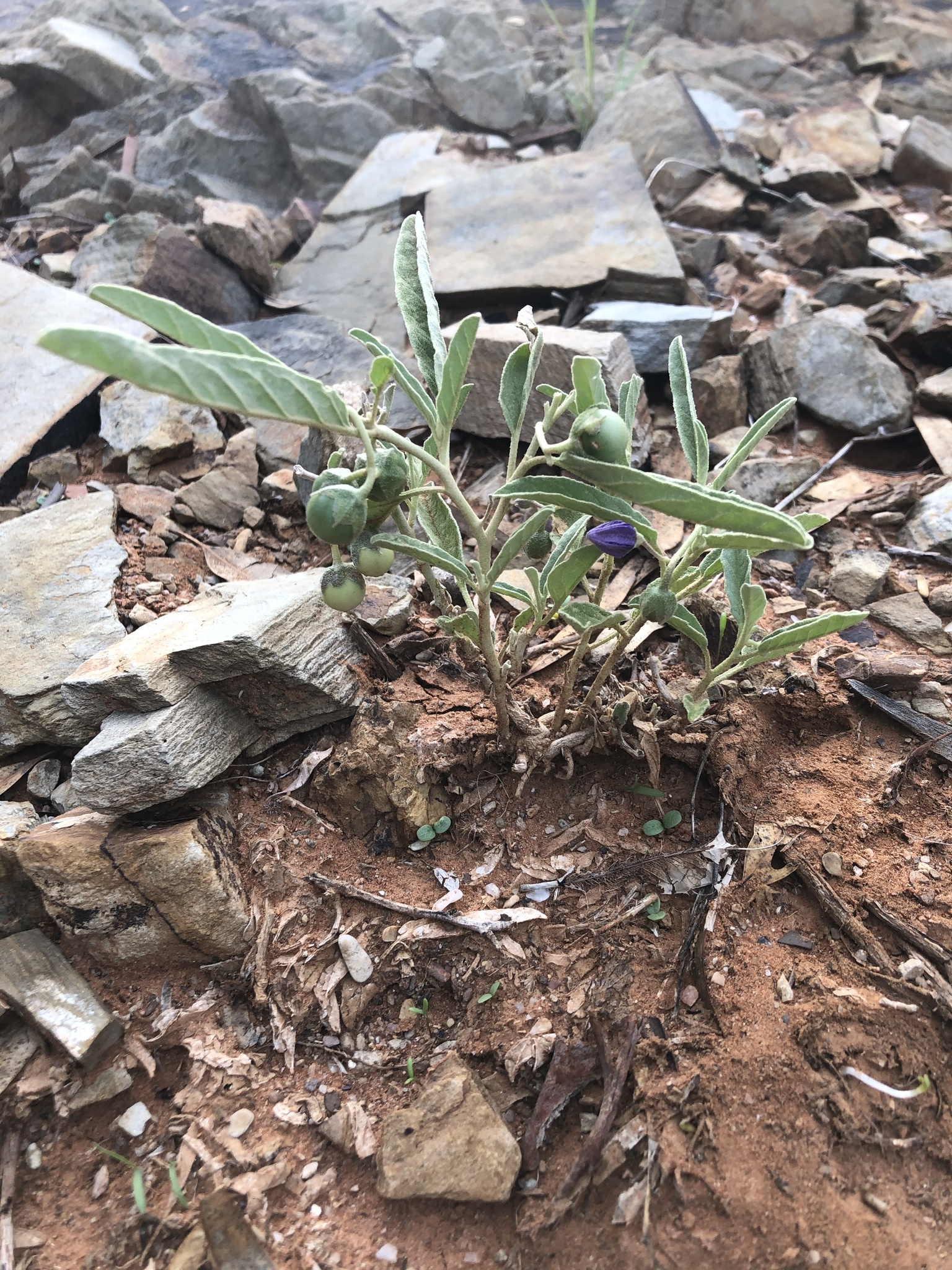
Small quena (Solanum esuriale) with unripe green berries

The plant is green-grey in colour, and grows 15 to 30 cm tall with branches at or near to the ground. Unlike other Solanum species, it typically does not have prickles, but if present they will be sparse and towards the base of the plant. The plant is covered all over with dense pale stellate hairs.

The leaves are oblong or oblong-lanceolate in shape. Lower leaves are 5-8 cm long, while adult leaves are generally shorter at 3-7 cm long. Flowers appear in 2-6 cymes. Flowers are a 5-pointed star, most often purple, with 5 yellow anthers that are 3 to 5mm long.

The berry is spherical or ovoid, 10 to 15mm diameter, and has a pointed base. An unripe berry is pale green, and it ripens to light yellow or brown. At no stage does the berry have stripes. Seeds are 2–3 mm long, pale yellow-brown.

It may be confused with many other Solanum with overlapping distributions, including western nightshade (S. coactiliferum), potato bush (S. cleistogamum), and silverleaf nightshade (S. elaeagnifolium); the later of these is invasive to Australia and considered a noxious weed. Variation in leaf morphology of other Solanum species means differentiation is difficult outside of the summer to autumn fruiting season. The pointed based and lack of stripes on the berry are a distinguishing feature of the quena.

== Distribution and habitat ==
Solanum esuriale has been located across the Australian mainland, with distribution primarily within arid zones of Victoria, New South Wales, South Australia, and Queensland. It is typically found in sandy soils near creek beds and pools of water, but is also associated with other ecological communities including wooded downs (defined by dominance of Acacia cana) and gidgee (defined by dominance of Acacia cambagei) communities.

In overgrazed regions of western Queensland, it has been found to be most dominant on cracking clay. In this region it has been identified as a pioneer species.

== Ecology ==
Dispersal of the seed has not been specifically described for S. esuriale. However, as with other Solanum species, distribution is most likely through consumption of the berry by mammals and birds, including sheep. Lizards are less likely to be dispersers as the berry is firm, which is generally less attractive to lizard species.

== Uses ==
=== Culinary ===
As with other bush tomatoes, S. esuriale is traditionally a valuable food source for Indigenous Australians; the term "esu'riale" has been used to describe "appeasing hunger" in specific reference to the fruits of the quena.

Preparation for eating is uncertain, but likely to be similar to other Solanum species, with the fruit eaten fresh, dried, or cooked; the seeds may or may not need to be removed prior to eating. The fruit is reportedly sweet.

=== Agriculture ===
Sheep are known to readily eat the fruits, but the remainder of the plant is considered unpalatable herbage. Even when dried and powered, addition of S. esuriale leaves and stems to feed has shown limited success for ingestrion by sheep during experimental intake. Despite association, S. esuriale has not been definitively found to cause humpy back in sheep.

The eggfruit caterpillar (Leucinodes cordalis), a common agricultural pest, are known to eat the fruit.

=== Skincare ===
Extract of S. esuriale, as well as extract of S. glaucophyllum, has been patented for use in topical skincare products by Johnson & Johnson as a method of treating dry skin, skin with a compromised barrier, or as an anti-aging treatment.
