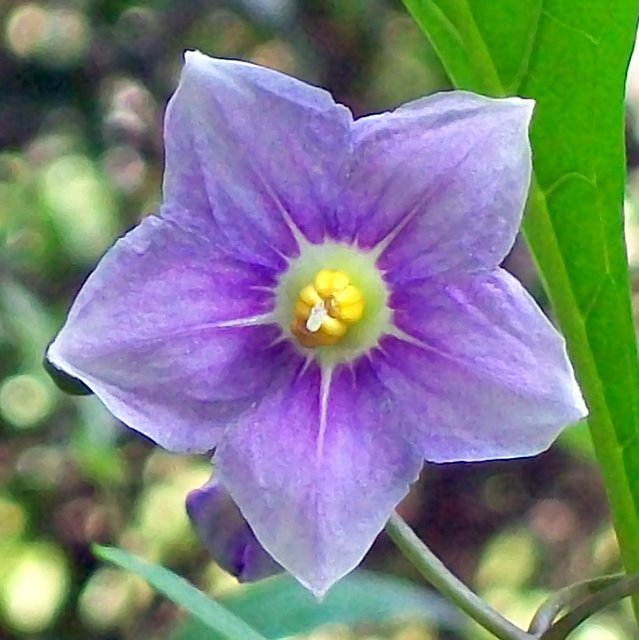

Scientific classification
- Kingdom: Plantae
- Clade: Embryophytes
- Clade: Tracheophytes
- Clade: Spermatophytes
- Clade: Angiosperms
- Clade: Eudicots
- Clade: Asterids
- Order: Solanales
- Family: Solanaceae
- Genus: Solanum
- Species: S. aviculare

Binomial name
- Solanum aviculare G.Forst.

Synonyms
- List: Solanum aviculare var. acutifolium Korneva nom. inval.; Solanum aviculare G.Forst. var. aviculare; Solanum aviculare var. brisbanense Geras. nom. inval.; Solanum aviculare var. brisbanense Geras. nom. inval.; Solanum aviculare var. brisbanense Geras. nom. inval., nom. nud.; Solanum aviculare var. brisbanense Geras. nom. inval., nom. nud.; Solanum aviculare var. brisbanense Geras. nom. inval., pro syn.; Solanum aviculare var. brisbanense R.W.Purdie, Symon & Haegi nom. inval., pro syn.; Solanum aviculare var. brisbanense E.M.Ross nom. inval., pro syn.; Solanum aviculare var. grandiflorum Korneva nom. inval.; Solanum aviculare var. grandifolium Korneva nom. inval.; Solanum aviculare var. hybridum Korneva nom. inval.; Solanum aviculare var. patulum Korneva nom. inval.; Solanum aviculare var. typicum Domin nom. inval.; Solanum brisbanense Geras. nom. inval., nom. nud.; Solanum brisbanense R.W.Purdie, Symon & Haegi nom. inval., pro syn.; Solanum brisbanense E.M.Ross nom. inval., pro syn.; Solanum laciniatum auct. non Aiton: Heward, R. in Hooker, W.J. (1842); Solanum laciniatum auct. non Aiton: Moore, C. (1870)

= Solanum aviculare =

Species of plant

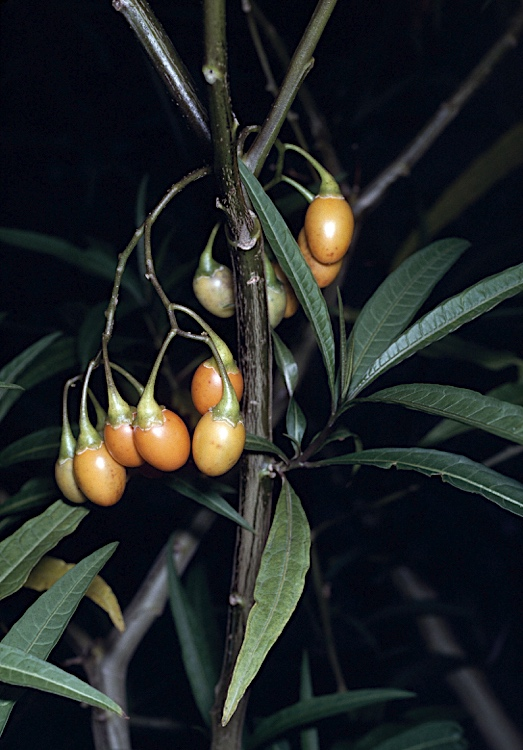
Fruit in Mt Annan Botanic Garden

Solanum aviculare, commonly known as kangaroo apple or New Zealand nightshade, is a species of flowering plant in the family Solanaceae and native to New Zealand and the east coast of Australia.

== Description ==
Solanum aviculare is an erect shrub that typically grows to a height of up to 4 m (13 ft) tall. The leaves are lance-shaped to elliptic, 80–250 mm (3.1–9.8 in) long and 10–35 mm (0.39–1.38 in) wide, or sometimes lobed, broadly elliptic to egg-shaped with the narrower end towards the base, 150–300 mm (5.9–11.8 in) long with lobes 10–100 mm (0.39–3.94 in) long and 5–20 mm (0.20–0.79 in) long. Both sides of the leaves are the same shade of green, with a petiole 10–20 mm (0.39–0.79 in) long. The flowers are arranged in groups of up to ten on a peduncle up to 35 mm (1.4 in) long, each flower on a pedicel 15–20 mm (0.59–0.79 in) long. The calyx is 5–6 mm (0.20–0.24 in) with triangular lobes 1.5–3 mm (0.059–0.118 in) long and the petals blue-violet and fused, forming a star-like pattern 25–40 mm (0.98–1.57 in) in diameter. Flowering mostly occurs in spring and summer, and the fruit is an orange-red to scarlet, oval to elliptic berry 10–15 mm (0.39–0.59 in) in diameter.

== Taxonomy and naming ==
Solanum aviculare was first described in 1786 by German naturalist Georg Forster in his De Plantis Esculentis Insularum Oceani Australis Commentatio Botanica, from a collection in New Zealand. The specific epithet (aviculare) means 'pertaining to small birds', referring to Forster's observation that birds eat the fruit "most gratefully".

The Māori names pōroporo and pōporo come from a generic Proto-Polynesian term for any Solanum species and similar berry-bearing plants. Other names used for Solanum aviculare in the language include hōreto and peoi. Pōroporo is also a name used to refer to Solanum laciniatum in Māori.

== Distribution and habitat ==
Solanum aviculare is native to Australia, New Zealand and New Guinea. In Australia it occurs in eastern Queensland, New South Wales (including Lord Howe Island) and Victoria, where it grows in rainforest, wet forest and rainforest margins on clay soils. Associated Australian species include the rainforest plants golden sassafras (Doryphora sassafras), black wattle (Acacia melanoxylon), and lillypilly (Acmena smithii), and wet forest species brown barrel (Eucalyptus fastigata) and turpentine (Syncarpia glomulifera). The species occurs on both North and South Islands and Chatham Island of New Zealand where it usually grows in open shrubland up to 400 m (1,300 ft) above sea level. Naturalised populations are found in South Australia, Tasmania, and Western Australia, but the species is possibly extinct on Norfolk Island.

== Ecology ==
Bees are thought to pollinate the flowers.

== Uses ==
The fruit when unripe was traditionally boiled by Indigenous communities in Australia to allow for its use as an oral contraceptive for women.

The leaves and unripe fruits of S. aviculare contain the toxic alkaloid solasodine. S. aviculare is cultivated in Russia and Hungary for the solasidine which is extracted and used as a base material for the production of steroid contraceptives.

Indigenous communities in Australia also used the fruit as a poultice on swollen joints. The plant contains a steroid which is important to the production of cortisone.

The plant is also used as a rootstock for grafting eggplant.

== See also ==
- List of Solanum species
