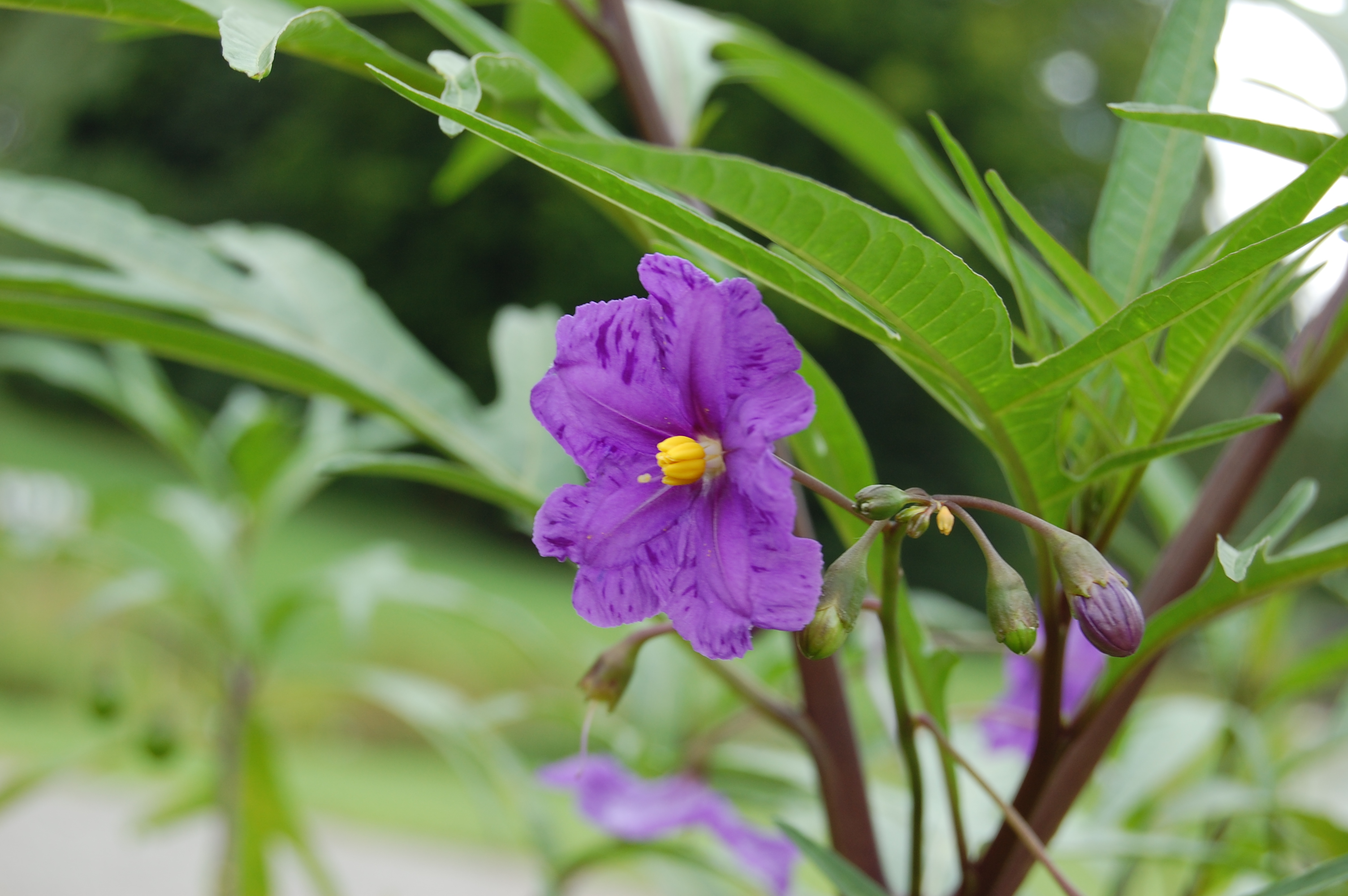

Scientific classification
- Kingdom: Plantae
- Clade: Tracheophytes
- Clade: Angiosperms
- Clade: Eudicots
- Clade: Asterids
- Order: Solanales
- Family: Solanaceae
- Genus: Solanum
- Species: S. laciniatum

Binomial name
- Solanum laciniatum Aiton

Synonyms
- Solanum aviculare var. laciniatum (Aiton) Domin; Solanum laciniatum f. australiense Gerasimenko; Solanum laciniatum f. cultum Gerasimenko; Solanum laciniatum f. novozelandicum Gerasimenko; Solanum laciniatum f. tasmanicum Gerasimenko; Solanum laciniatum f. viridicaule Gerasimenko; Solanum laciniatum var. fruticosum Sweet; Solanum laciniatum var. herbaceum Sweet; Solanum pinnatifidum Lam.; Solanum pinnatifolium Salisb., nom. illeg.

= Solanum laciniatum =

Species of plant

Solanum laciniatum (also known as poroporo or bullibulli) a soft-wooded shrub native to the east coast of Australia, notably Victoria and Tasmania. It also occurs in Western Australia and New Zealand, where some authorities consider it to be introduced. It is similar to Solanum aviculare, with which it shares the common name kangaroo apple. The common name refers to the likeness of the leaf shape to a kangaroo paw print. This plant is currently being cultivated to produce corticosteroid drugs.

== Description ==
The shrub typically grows to a height and width of 1 to 3 m (3 ft 3 in to 9 ft 10 in) and blooms between January and February, producing purple blue flowers. Solanum laciniatum is a hardy and short-lived glabrous perennial plant which can reach between 1 and 3 metres in height, but occasionally can reach up to 4 metres. It has a spindle-like shaped root system, consisting of numerous dividing roots which can go as deep as 20–30 cm into the ground.

Solanum laciniatum has leaves which measure approximately 8–30 cm in length, the leaves of the plant can occasionally have large marginal ‘teeth’ present. The flowers vary in colour from white to dark blue-violet, with the flowers being approximately 25–40 mm in width. The bright purple flowers have yellow anthers and the flowers themselves are distinctly cut into five petals, which is a characteristic able to be used as a comparison against other Solanum species. Fruit produced from Solanum laciniatum varies from bright orange red to a deep scarlet-red and is approximately 10–15 mm in width.

== Distribution and habitat ==
=== Natural and global range ===
It is indigenous to the North and South Islands of New Zealand, Stewart Island and the Chatham Islands but it is also present in the southeast of Australia and Tasmania. The plant has also been naturalized in areas of Russia and China, where plants have escaped cultivation and are freely reproducing in the wild without any form of assistance.

=== Habitat preferences ===
Solanum laciniatum grows in well-drained soils in full sun or partial shade. It often colonises disturbed soil and tracks and can tolerate moderately salty winds. Due to being a coastal to montane plant, it can be found between 0 and 400 metres above sea level. It is usually found in recently disturbed habitats such as fire damage on land, and is also found in shrublands, alongside rivers, in gullies and in forested areas. Although found commonly in the wild, it is also a very common weed in many urban areas in the country.

== Life Cycle/Phenology ==
Solanum laciniatum flowers throughout the year, also producing fruit throughout the year, and their seeds (2.2mm-2.5mm) in diameter will most likely have the ability to lay dormant in the soil for large periods of time. This is because Solanum laciniatum usually emerges from the soil after it has been disturbed. They are also able to grow from semi-hardwood cuttings but do tend to grow much better directly from seed. Solanum laciniatum are fast growing plants in correct conditions, but have a very short lifespan.

== Ecology ==
=== Soil preferences ===
Solanum laciniatum grows in well-drained soils in full sun or partial shade. But can be grown in a variety of different soil types, from sandy soils on the margins of the coast where salinity could possibly be higher, to forest conditions what could possibly be darker and have a different climate. Solanum laciniatum can also be found by sides of riverbanks, where saturation levels would be higher than the possibly dry conditions of the coast. Due to its growth habit of being able to rapidly take over land that has been disturbed such as after forest fires, this plant doesn’t need any key nutrients for its growth, it can happily survive a range of environments.

=== Predators ===
The fruit of Solanum laciniatum can be eaten by different species of birds. It can also be consumed by Leucinodes cordalis which is also known as the Poroporo fruit borer. This is a type of moth found both in New Zealand and Australia, and its primary host plant is Solanum laciniatum.

=== Parasites ===
Solanum laciniatum is also affected by the Poroporo gall mite (Tetra martini), which is an endemic mite to New Zealand. It punctures the surface of the plant’s cells and sucks up the sap directly from the leaf.

=== Diseases/Viruses ===
Solanum laciniatum can be affected by a variety of different viruses: Cucumber mosaic virus, potato virus x, potato virus y, tomato spotted wilt virus and tobacco mosaic virus. The Cucumber mosaic virus caused the most severe symptoms in the Solanum laciniatum plant, which caused the lamina of the leaf to narrow significantly and caused a mottling pattern on the plant.

== Other information ==
Solanum laciniatum is often confused with Solanum aviculare, which is a much less common plant than S. laciniatum in New Zealand. Solanum aviculare has much narrower leaves, with the flowers reaching 10 to 40 millimetres in diameter and has an overall different chromosome number than S. laciniatum, which has 2n=46 compared to S. aviculare which has 2n=92. The name poroporo is used to describe both species in Māori, and both species have similar cultural uses.

=== Cultural uses ===
Solanum laciniatum has been traditionally used by Māori culture in medicinal practices. The leaves are usually beaten up into a pulp to treat skin sores, made into an oil to also treat wounds, or the leaf is placed whole directly onto the site of wounds. The ripe berry of the plant was also a traditional food, and the leaves were occasionally used to line hāngī to impart a flavour to cooked foods, although this practice is now not recommended due to the presence of poisonous alkaloids in the plant's leaves.

The berry was popular among early European settlers to New Zealand, who would stew these and make pies or jams with the fruit. Early settlers referred to the fruit as bull-a-bull, or as Māori gooseberries.

Solanum laciniatum is well known for being previously cultivated on a commercial scale both in Taranaki, New Zealand and also by the former Soviet Union for the production and use of steroid hormones for birth control and relief from rheumatoid arthritis.

=== Medical uses ===
Solanum laciniatum like other plants in the same genus, contains a chemical called solasodine, a pharmaceutically important chemical compound. Steroid glycoalkaloids in the compound solasodine, which is naturally occurring in Solanum plants, and has become an important area of study for the synthesis of corticosteroids and contraceptives in medicine.

== Images ==
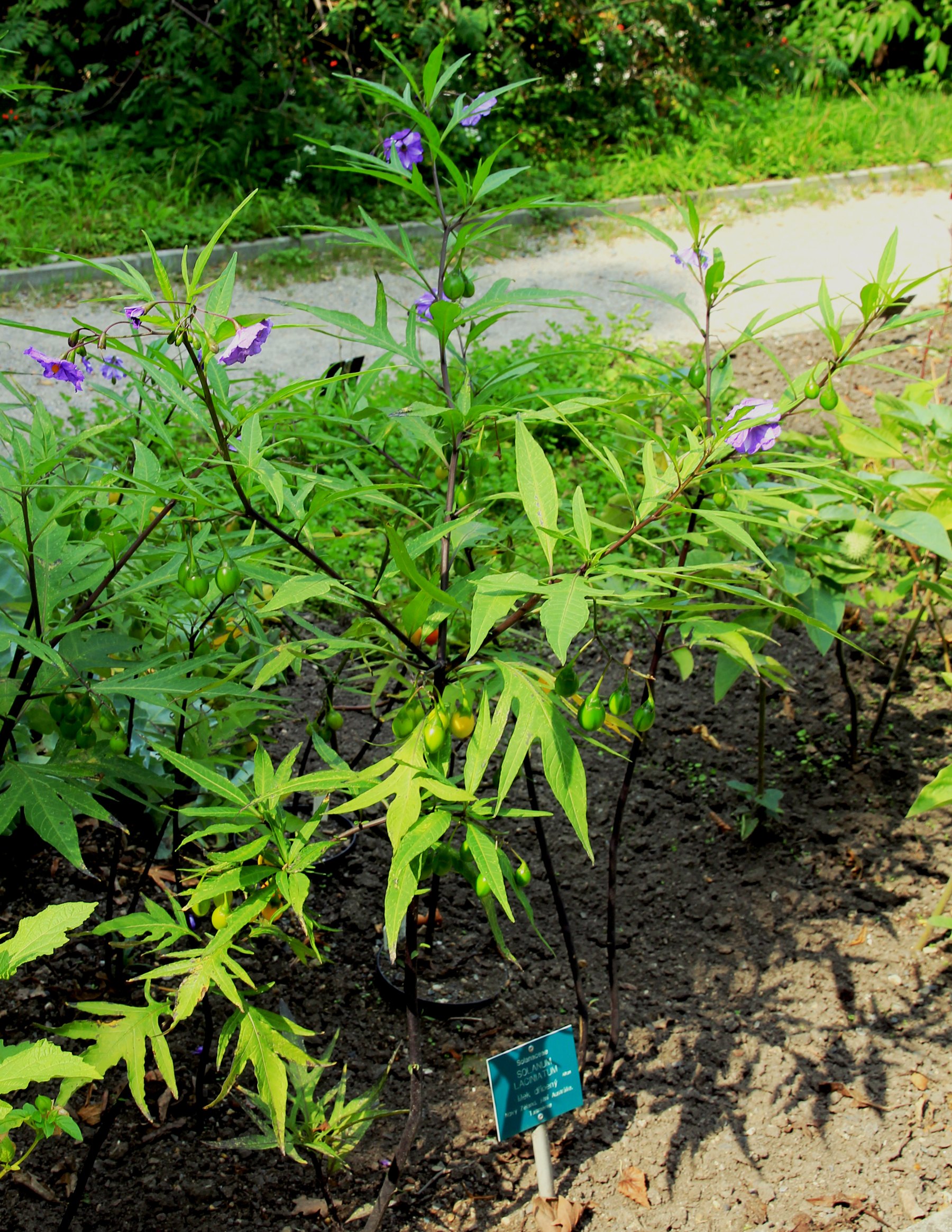
Foliage

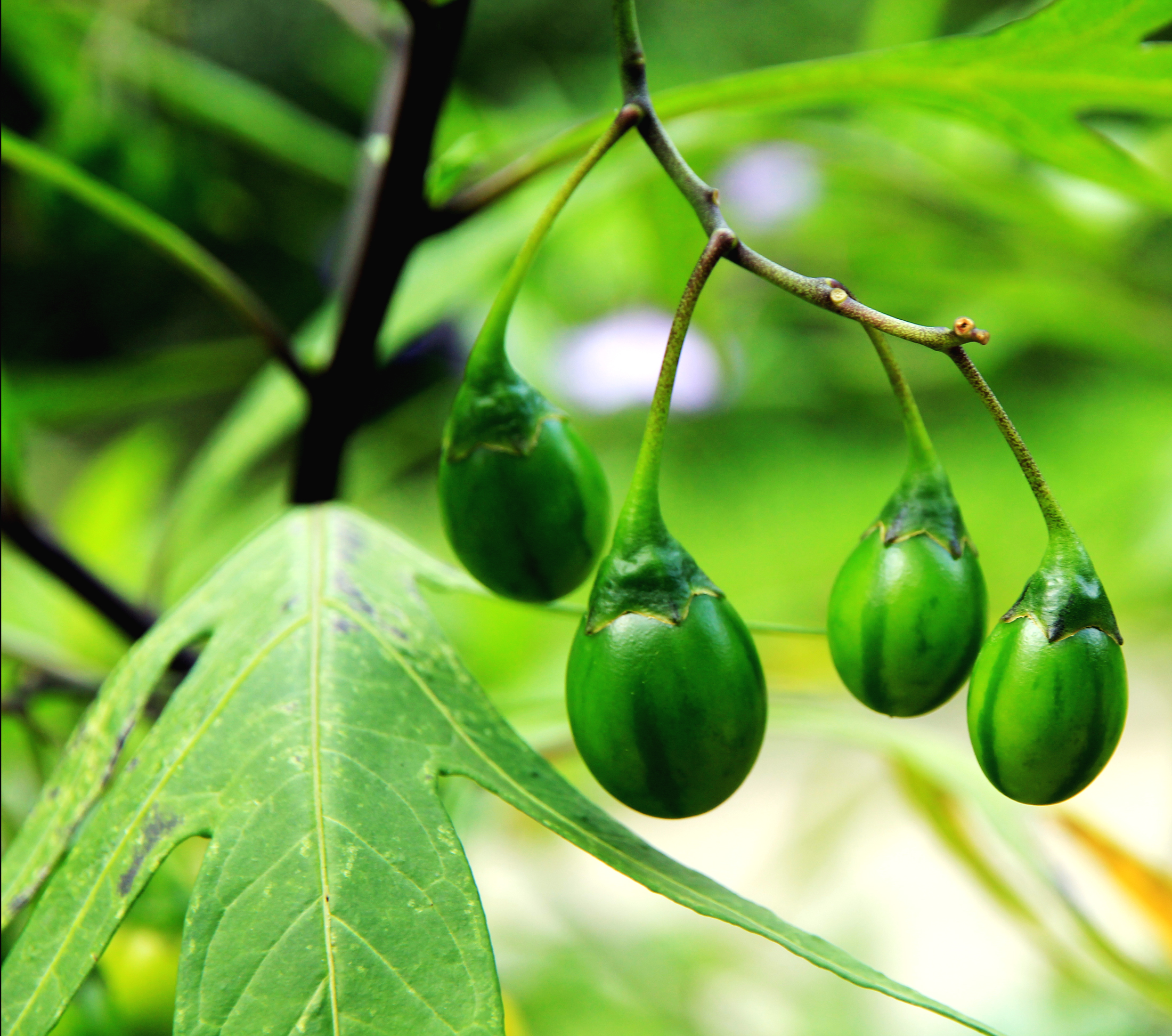
Fruit

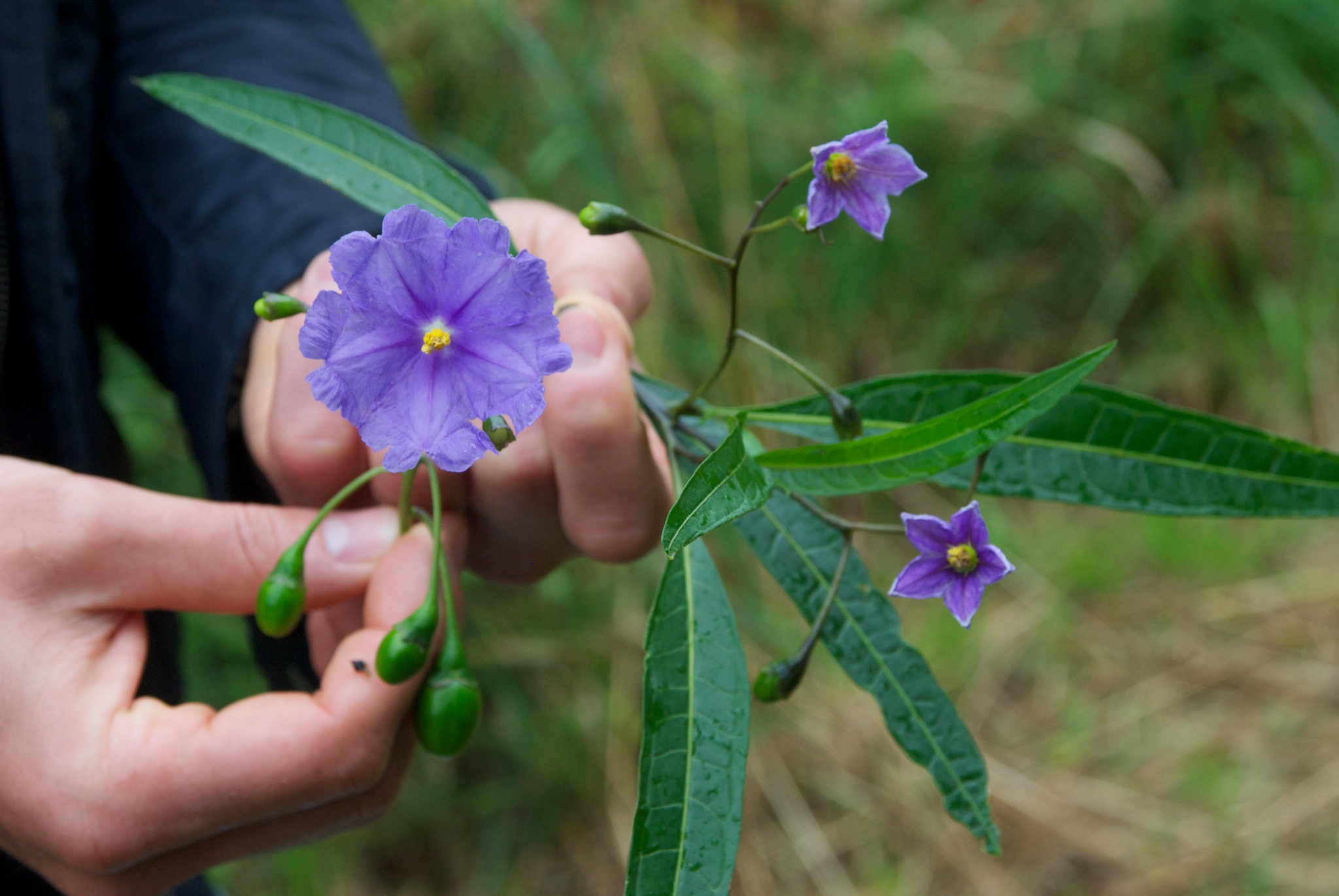
Comparison of Solanum laciniatum (left) and Solanum aviculare (right).
