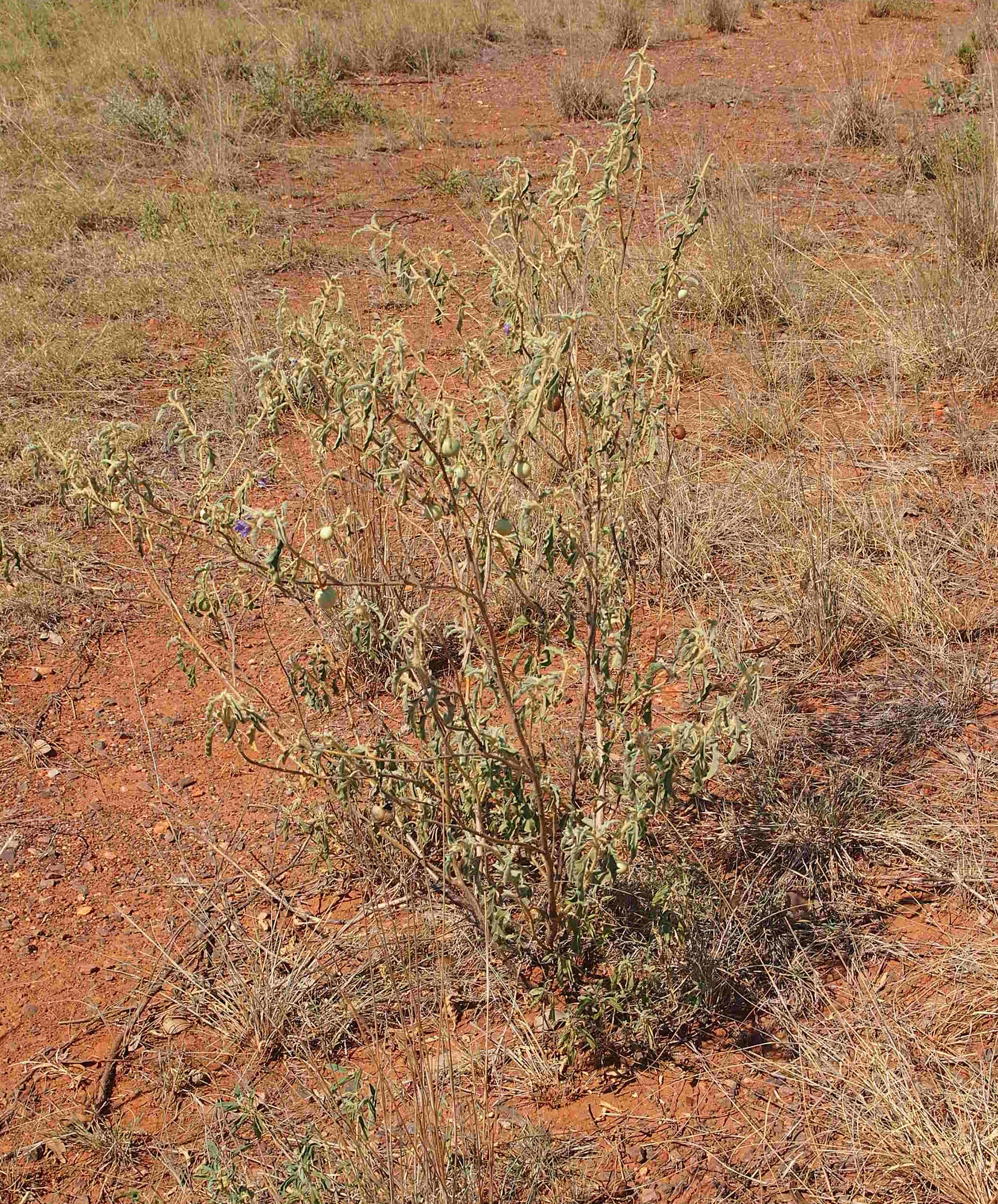

Scientific classification
- Kingdom: Plantae
- Clade: Tracheophytes
- Clade: Angiosperms
- Clade: Eudicots
- Clade: Asterids
- Order: Solanales
- Family: Solanaceae
- Genus: Solanum
- Species: S. chippendalei

Binomial name
- Solanum chippendalei Symon

= Solanum chippendalei =

Species of shrub

Solanum chippendalei (common names - solanum, bush tomato, ngaru, Chippendale's tomato) is a small fruiting shrub in the family Solanaceae, native to northern Australia. It is named after the botanist who described it, George Chippendale. The fruits, known as "bush tomatoes", are edible and are an important indigenous food, and the Aboriginal people who use them broadcast the seed for later harvesting.

The species occurs in Western Australia, the Northern Territory and Queensland.

== Distribution ==
In Queensland it is found in the IBRA region of Mount Isa Inlier.

In the Northern Territory it is found in the IBRA regions of: Burt Plain, Central Ranges, Davenport Murchison Ranges, Gibson Desert, Great Sandy Desert, MacDonnell Ranges, Ord Victoria Plain, and Tanami.

In Western Australia it is found in the IBRA regions of:Central Ranges, Gascoyne, Gibson Desert, Great Sandy Desert, Little Sandy Desert, Pilbara, and Tanami.

== Habitat ==
S. chippendalei is found on spinifex-dominated rocky or gravelly rises, hills or ranges composed of neutral or acidic rocks, on Mulga-dominated red earth plains and on sandplains, and often in recently burnt areas and disturbed areas.

== Names ==
The many Indigenous names reflect both its importance in the Central desert and the many language groups. They are:

- Alyawarr: anaweyt, anemangkerr, kanakety
- Anmatyerr: anakety, antyewal
- Eastern Arrernte: *anaketye
- Jaru: rambaramba.
- Kaytetye: antyewarle, kanaketye, karnaketye, kwenemangkerre
- Pintupi Luritja: ngaru, pintalypa, pura
- Pitjantjatjara: ngaru, pintalypa, pura, wirkalpa
- Waramangu: nganjawarli
- Warlpiri: kakaja, ngaru, kurla-parnta, nganjawarli, ngayaki, wanakiji
- Western Arrernte: kwere
