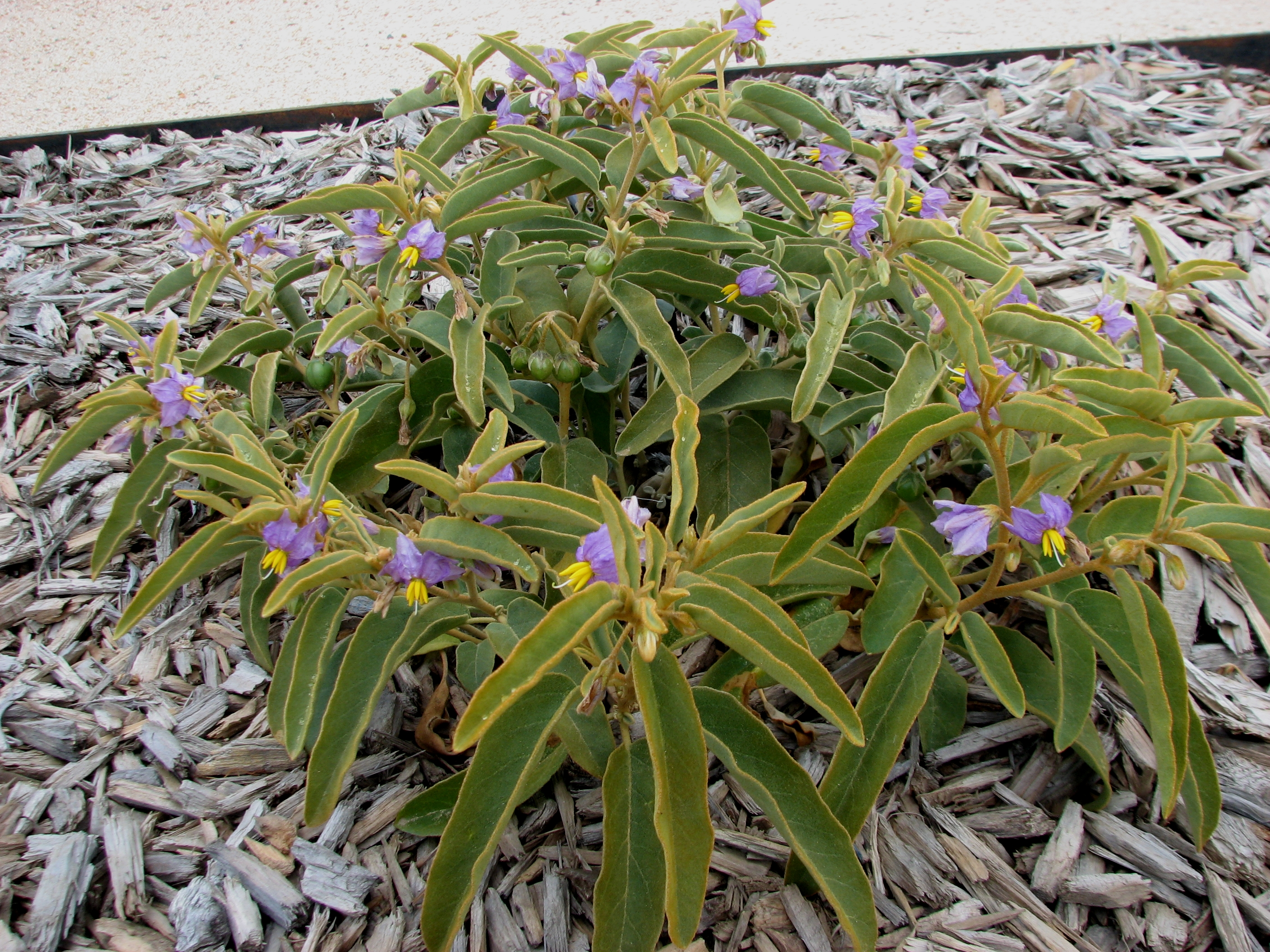

Scientific classification
- Kingdom: Plantae
- Clade: Tracheophytes
- Clade: Angiosperms
- Clade: Eudicots
- Clade: Asterids
- Order: Solanales
- Family: Solanaceae
- Genus: Solanum
- Species: S. centrale

Binomial name
- Solanum centrale J.M.Black

= Solanum centrale =

Australian desert raisin

Species of plant

Solanum centrale, the kutjera, or Australian desert raisin, is a plant native to the more arid parts of Australia. Like other "bush tomatoes", it has been used as a food source by Central Australia and Aboriginal groups for millennia.

Solanum centrale was first described by J.M. Black in 1934.

Like many plants of the genus Solanum, desert raisin is a small bush and has a thorny aspect. It is a fast-growing shrub that fruits prolifically the year after fire or good rains. It can also grow back after being dormant as root stock for years after drought years. The fruit are 1–3 cm in diameter, yellow in color when fully ripe, vitamin C-rich and possibly a source of vitamin C. These fruits dry on the bush, look like raisins and have a strong, pungent taste of tamarillo and caramel that makes them popular for use in sauces and condiments. They can be obtained either whole or ground, with the ground product (sold as "kutjera powder") easily added to bread mixes, salads, sauces, cheese dishes, chutneys, stews or mixed into butter.

Martu people would skewer bush tomatoes and dry them so the food was readily transportable.

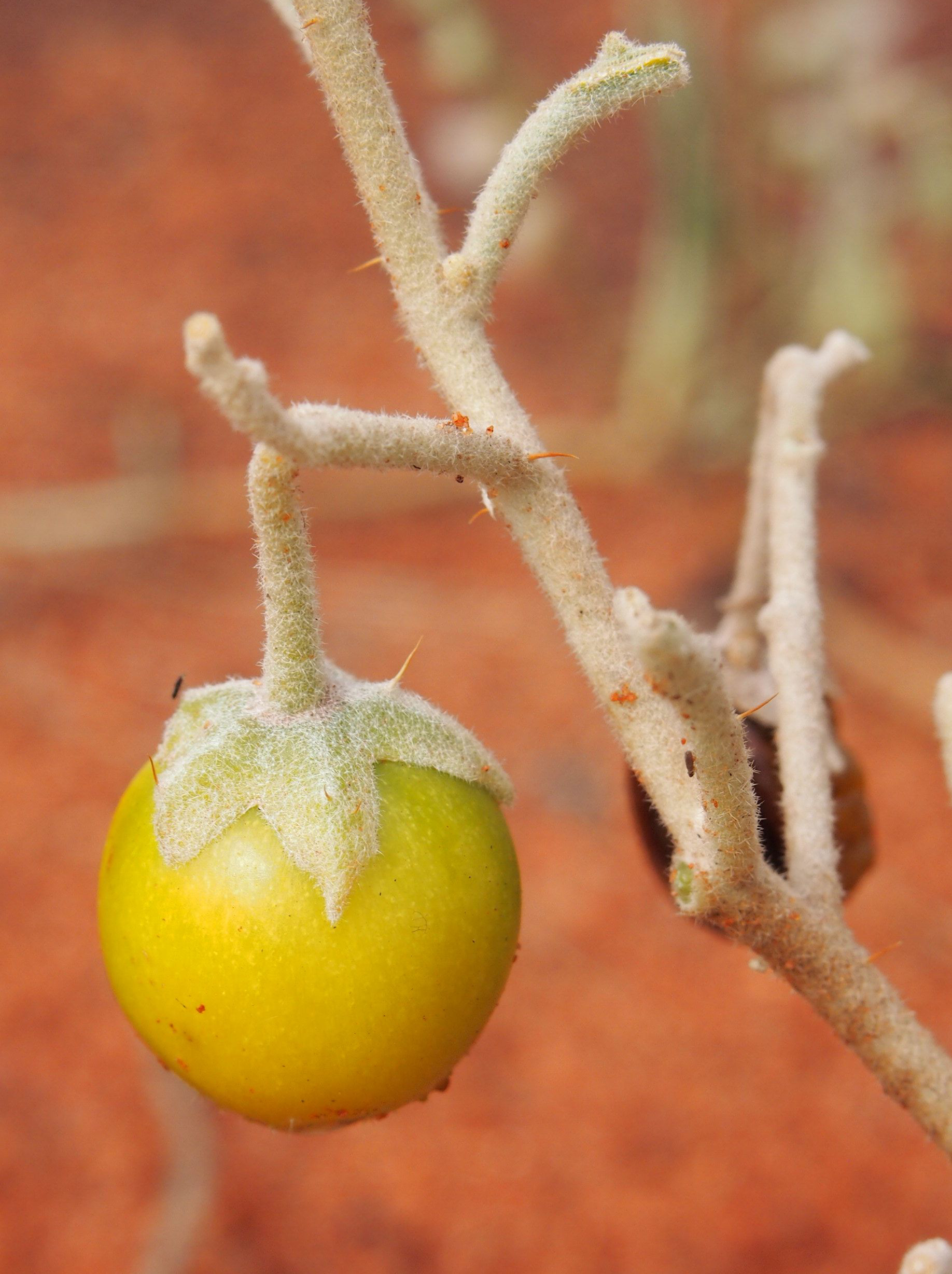
Unripe fruit and sharp spines

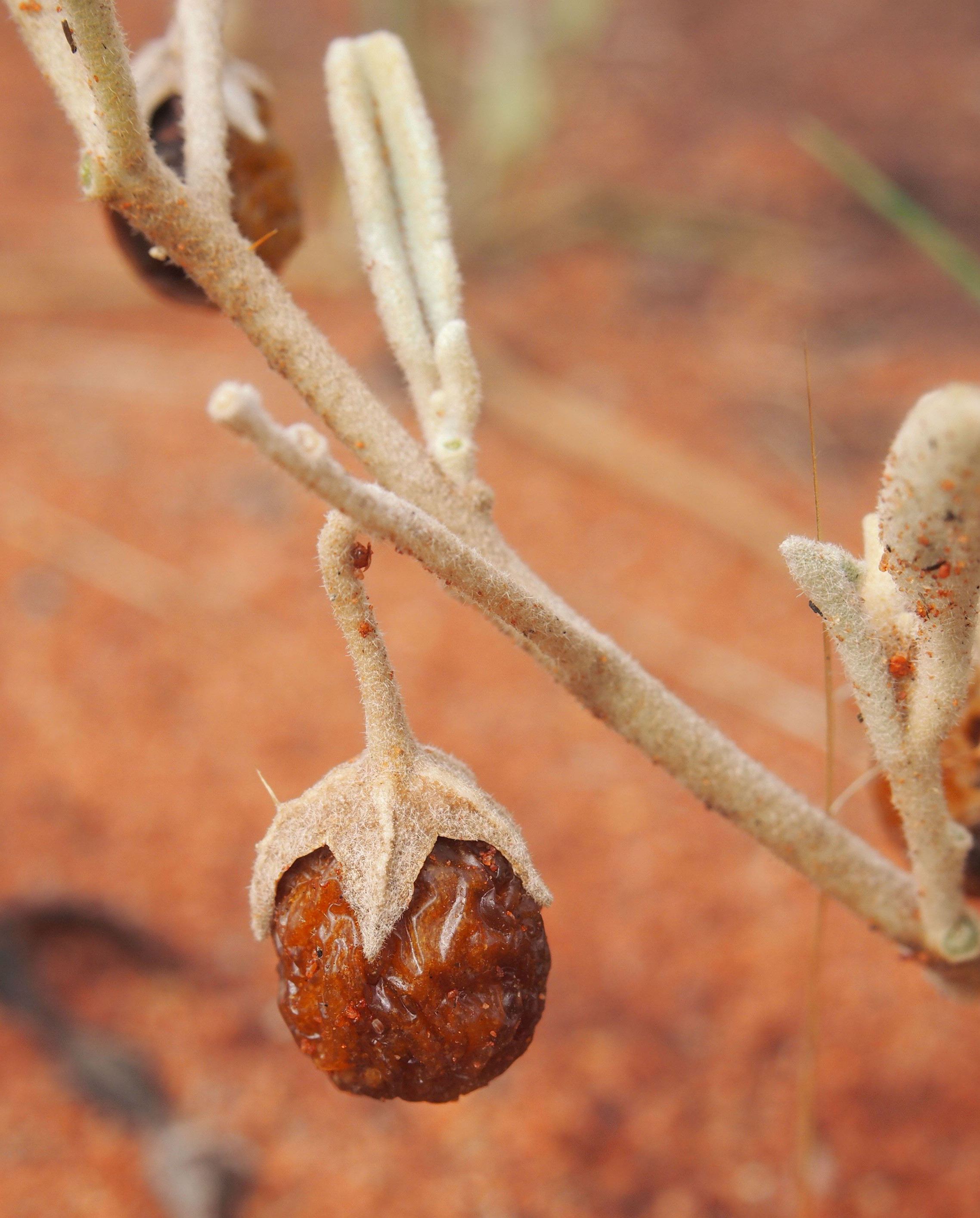
Dried fruit on the plant

== Some other names ==
Language	Name
Alyawarr	Akatjurra
Arrernte	Merne akatyerre
English	Bush raisin, bush tomato, bush sultana
Pitjantjatjara	Kampurarpa
Walmajarri	Warrangkarli

== Cultivation ==
Traditionally, the dried fruit is collected from the small bushes in late autumn and early winter. In the wild, they fruit for only two months. These days they are grown commercially by Aboriginal communities in the deserts of central Australia. Using irrigation, they have extended the fruiting season to eight months. The fruit are grown by Amata and Mimili communities in the Anangu Pitjantjatjara Yankunytjatjara lands, by the Dinahline community near Ceduna, by the Nepabunna community in the northern Flinders Ranges, and on the Tangglun Piltengi Yunti farm in Murray Bridge, and are marketed by Outback Pride.
