= Beronda Montgomery =

American microbiologist

- Education: Washington University in St. Louis; University of Central Arkansas; University of California, Davis (2001)
- Awards: NSF CAREER Award
- Scientific career
- Fields: Molecular biology, microbiology, plant biology, mentoring, leadership
- Workplaces: Grinnell College; Michigan State University; Indiana University
- Thesis: Regulation of distinct aspects of photomorphogenesis in transgenic plants (2001)
- Website: Personal website

Beronda Montgomery is a writer, science communicator, and researcher. She has spent more than 20 years as a professor and academic administrator at Michigan State University and Grinnell College. Her research has centered on how photosynthetic organisms adapt to changes in their environment. She has also studied mentorship and faculty development to develop evidence-based strategies to foster equity and inclusion in academia. Together with Tanisha Williams and other members of the Black Botanists Week organizing committee, Montgomery co-founded and co-organizes Black Botanists Week.

== Education and early career ==
Montgomery received her bachelor's degree in biology from Washington University in St. Louis and her master's degree in biology from University of Central Arkansas. She then went on to complete her PhD in Plant Biology in 2001 at the University of California, Davis. She later became a postdoctoral fellow in Microbial Biology at Indiana University with the support of a National Science Foundation (NSF) award. In 2004, she joined the faculty at Michigan State University where she remained through spring semester of 2022.

== Academic leadership ==
Montgomery served as assistant provost for faculty development from 2016 to 2020 at MSU with responsibility for supporting all faculty and academic staff in the areas of research, scholarship, and creative activities. She was appointed as interim assistant vice president for research and innovation at MSU in 2020. From 2021 - 2022, she served as assistant vice president for research and innovation. Montgomery was named associate vice president for strategic initiatives and operations at MSU and served in that capacity until her departure from MSU at the end of the spring semester in 2022.

From July 2022 through July 2024, Montgomery served as vice president for Academic Affairs and Dean of the college at Grinnell College.

== Research ==
Montgomery's research centers on the dynamic molecular mechanisms that allow photosynthetic organisms—from cyanobacteria to plant species—to adapt and respond to changes in their photoenvironment. These organisms must respond to changes in light sources in order to continue photosynthesis, so they've developed finely tuned growth and developmental responses.

Her research contributions have been recognized by the American Academy of Microbiology when she was elected as a fellow in 2018, the American Association for the Advancement of Science when she was elected as a fellow in 2020, the American Society of Plant Biologists when she was elected as a fellow in 2021, and the American Society for Biochemistry and Molecular Biology when she was elected as fellow in 2022.

== Mentorship ==
Montgomery also conducts scholarship and training initiatives on mentoring. She has published extensively on evidence-based strategies to nurture and retain talent in academia, developing strategies for effective mentorship that center on the individual and their specific needs and goals.

== Books ==
Lessons from Plants, Harvard University Press, April 2021

When Trees Testify: Science, Wisdom, History, and America’s Black Botanical Legacy, Henry Holt and Company, January 20, 2026

== Awards and honors ==
- National Science Foundation CAREER Award, 2007
- Michigan State University Foundation Professorship, 2016
- American Society for Microbiology Distinguished Lecturer, 2017-2019
- American Academy of Microbiology Fellow, 2018
- John Wiley Jones Distinguished Lecturer, 2019
- Cell Press CrossTalk's 100 Inspiring Black Scientists in America List, 2020
- Union of Concerned Scientists Science Defender, 2020
- American Association for the Advancement of Science, Elected Fellow, 2020
- Ritter Memorial Lecturer, 2021
- NSF BIO Distinguished Lecturer, 2021
- Botanical Society of America, Recipient, Charles Edwin Bessey Teaching Award, 2021
- American Society of Plant Biologists, Elected Fellow, 2021
- American Society for Cell Biology, Recipient, Mentoring Keynote Award, 2021
- GardenComm [Garden Communicators International], Honoree, Cynthia Westcott Scientific Writing Award, 2022
- American Society for Biochemistry and Molecular Biology, Elected Fellow, 2022
- American Society for Microbiology, Recipient, Honorary Diversity Lecturer Award, 2022
- American Society of Plant Biologists, Recipient, Adolph E. Gude, Jr. Award, 2022
- Recipient, Hutchinson Medal of the Chicago Horticultural Society, 2023
- American Society of Plant Biologists, Recipient, Excellence in Diversity and Inclusion Award, 2024
- American Society of Plant Biologists, Member, American Society of Plant Biology Pioneers, 2024
- Recipient, North American Arabidopsis Steering Committee (NAASC) Excellence in Supporting Diversity, 2024
- Pauline Newman Distinguished Speaker, Vassar College, 2024
- Recipient, Presidential Award for Excellence in Science, Mathematics, and Engineering Mentoring (PAESMEM), 2025
- Sally Starling Seaver Fellow, Radcliffe Institute, Harvard University, 2025-2026
