= Judbarra / Gregory National Park =

National park in Australia

Coordinates: 15°36′58″S 131°07′38″E

Judbarra National Park
- IUCN category II (national park)
- Judbarra National Park
- Location: Northern Territory
- Nearest city: Katherine
- Area: 13,004.12 km^{2} (5,020.92 sq mi)
- Established: 1990
- Governing body: Parks and Wildlife Commission of the Northern Territory
- Website: Official website

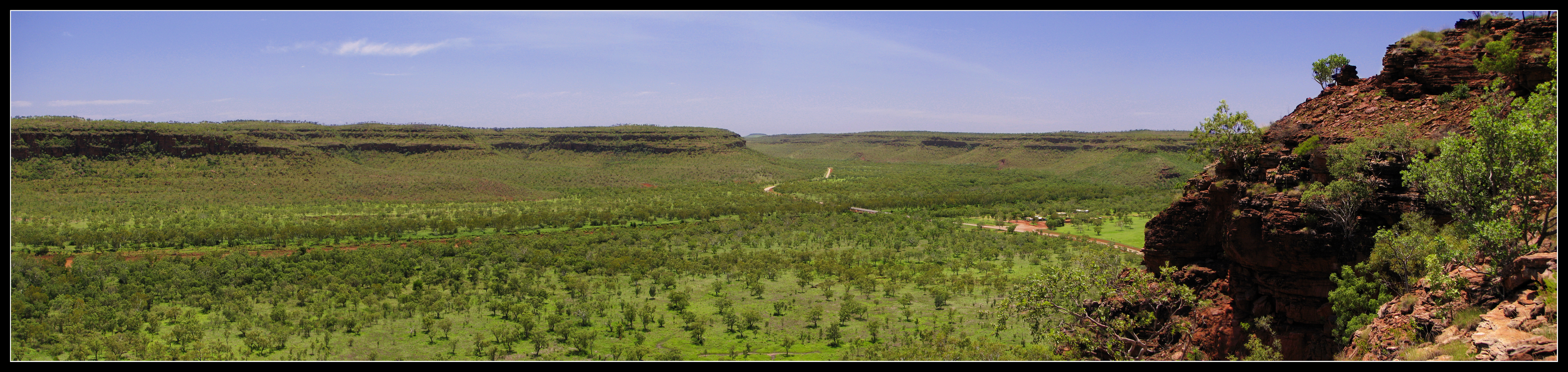
Judbarra National Park, 2010

Judbarra National Park, formerly Gregory National Park and Judbarra / Gregory National Park, is a national park in the Northern Territory of Australia, 359 km (223 mi) south of Darwin.

The park is the second largest national park in the Northern Territory, after Kakadu National Park, with an area of 13,000 km (8,100 mi).

The park was formerly known as Gregory National Park, but on 21 October 2011, it was announced that under a joint management plan with the traditional owners, the park would be dual-named "Judbarra / Gregory National Park" for a period of ten years. Since 2021, its official name is Judbarra National Park.

The park consists of two geographically disjoint sections. The larger section lies to the southwest of the smaller northeastern section.

== Indigenous peoples and culture ==
The park includes traditional lands of several Indigenous Australian groups, including Ngarinyman, Karrangpurru, Malngin, Wardaman, Ngaliwurru, Nungali, Bilinara, Gurindji, and Jaminjung, and spans the boundary between two major Australian language families, Pama Nyungan and Non-Pama-Nyungan (Northern).

The rock shelters and caves in Judbarra contain an extensive amount of Aboriginal rock art, variously created by painting, stencilling, drawing, printing, and "pecking and pounding". The human figure is the most common motif; the park is "one of the most prolific sites in Australia" for composite engraved and painted human figures. The rock art of the Judbarra region is considered to represent a distinct art province.

== Ecology ==
Ecologically, the park is in the transition between tropical and semi-arid zones.

The park has been identified by BirdLife International as an Important Bird Area (IBA) because it supports much of the eastern subspecies of the white-quilled rock-pigeon and small numbers of the endangered Gouldian finch, as well as populations of the chestnut-backed buttonquail, partridge pigeon, yellow-rumped mannikin and several other near-threatened or savanna-biome-restricted species.

A plant that is only known to the park, Solanum scalarium, also known as Garrarnawun bush tomato, was collected near Garrarnawun Lookout in 2018 and formally described in 2022.

== See also ==
- Gregory's Tree Historical Reserve
- Protected areas of the Northern Territory
