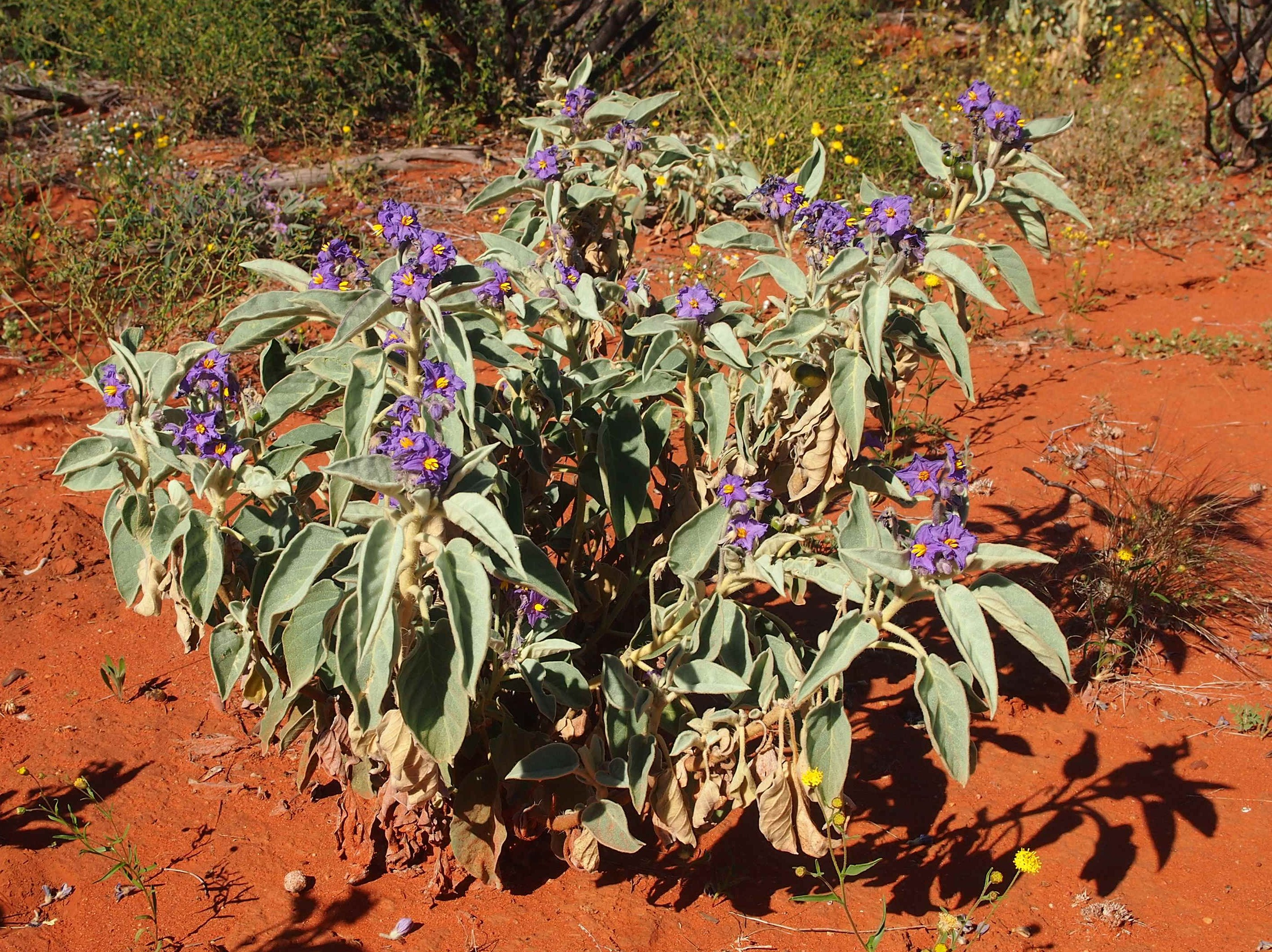

Scientific classification
- Kingdom: Plantae
- Clade: Tracheophytes
- Clade: Angiosperms
- Clade: Eudicots
- Clade: Asterids
- Order: Solanales
- Family: Solanaceae
- Genus: Solanum
- Species: S. quadriloculatum

Binomial name
- Solanum quadriloculatum F.Muell.

Synonyms
- Solanum ellipticum var. duribaccalis J.M.Black

= Solanum quadriloculatum =

Tomato bush

Species of plant

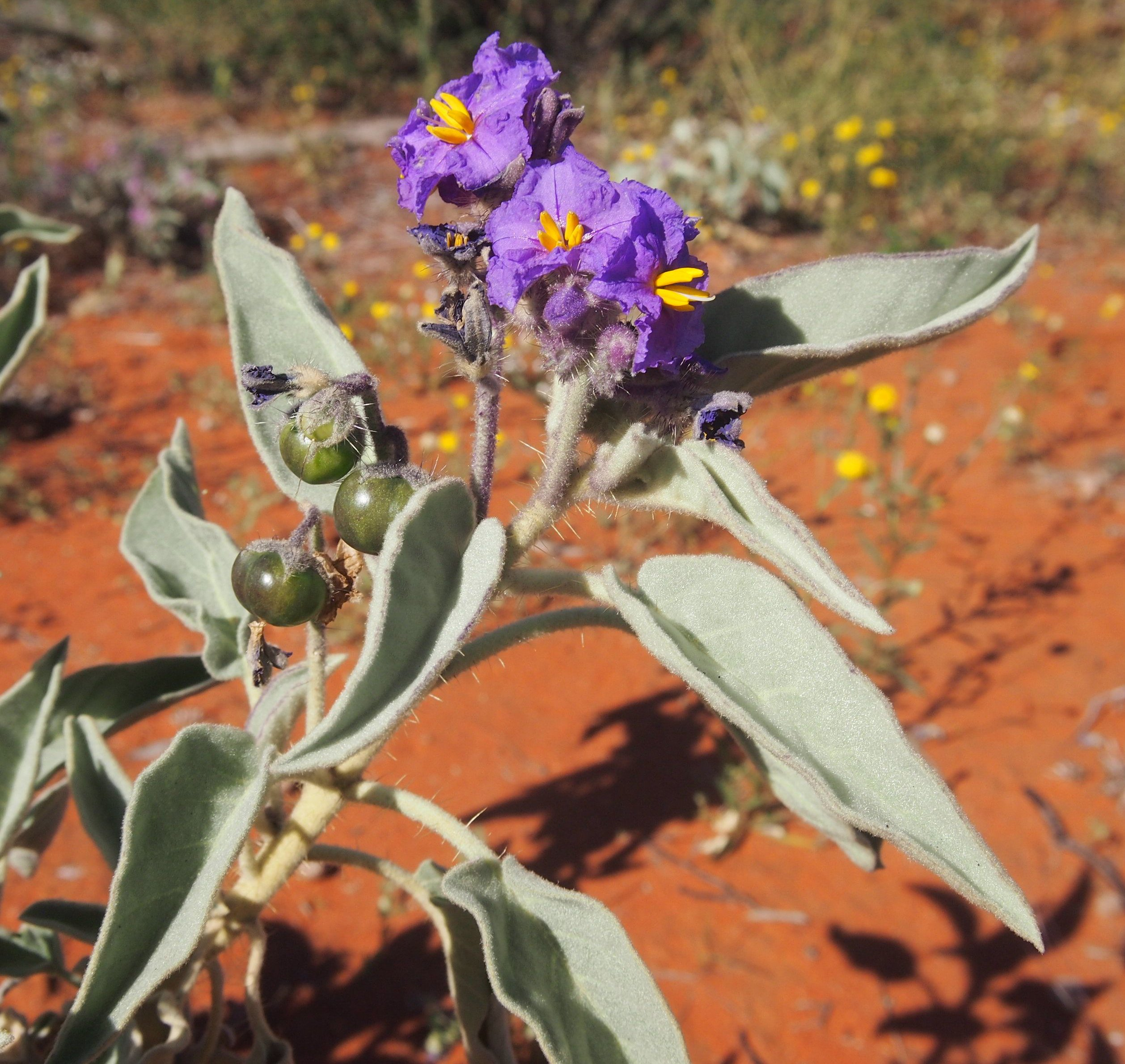
The flowers and unripe fruit of Solanum quadriloculatum.

Solanum quadriloculatum commonly known as tomato bush or wild tomato, is a flowering plant in the family Solanaceae. It is an upright perennial with hairy, grey-green thick leaves and purple flowers and grows on mainland Australia with the exception of Victoria.

== Description ==
Solanum quadriloculatum is an upright or spreading shrub to 0.5 m (1 ft 8 in) high, leaves thick, grey-green or yellowish-green, densely covered in star-shaped hairs, occasionally rough, prickly, elliptic to oval-shaped, 5–9 cm (2.0–3.5 in) long, 1.5–5 cm (0.59–1.97 in) wide, margins entire or slightly wavy on a petiole 1–4 cm (0.39–1.57 in) long. The purple flowers are borne in groups of 2-3, 2–2.5 cm (0.79–0.98 in) wide, 5 lobed, 4–6 mm (0.16–0.24 in) long, mostly star-shaped and peduncle 15–20 mm (0.59–0.79 in) long. Flowering occurs from early autumn to spring and the fruit is a brownish-yellow berry 10–15 mm (0.39–0.59 in) in diameter.

== Taxonomy and naming ==
Solanum quadriloculatum was first formally described in 1861 by Ferdinand von Mueller and the description was published in Fragmenta Phytographiae Australiae. The specific epithet (quadriloculatum) means '4 celled'.

== Distribution and habitat ==
Tomato bush grows along disturbed roadways, clay, loam soils and dry locations that are seasonally flooded in New South Wales, Queensland, South Australia, Western Australia and the Northern Territory.
