= Results of the 2012 Northern Territory general election =

This is a list of electoral division results for the Northern Territory 2012 General Election.

== Overall results ==
NT Legislative Assembly (IRV) — Turnout 76.9% (CV) — Informal 3.2%
| Party | Votes | % | Swing | Seats | Change |
|---|---|---|---|---|---|
| Country Liberal Party | 46,653 | 50.6 | +5.2 | 16 | +4 |
| Labor Party | 33,594 | 36.5 | −6.7 | 8 | −4 |
| NT Greens | 3,039 | 3.3 | −1.0 | 0 | 0 |
| The First Nations Political Party | 2,048 | 2.2 | +2.2 | 0 | 0 |
| Australian Sex Party | 717 | 0.8 | +0.8 | 0 | 0 |
| Independents | 5,566 | 6.0 | −1.1 | 1 | 0 |
| Other | 526 | 0.6 | +0.6 | 0 | 0 |
| Total | 92,143 | | | 25 | |
| Country Liberal Party | 51,435 | 55.8 | +5.1 | 16 | +4 |
| Labor Party | 40,709 | 44.2 | −5.1 | 8 | −4 |

== Results by Electoral Division ==
=== Arafura ===
2012 Northern Territory general election: Arafura
| Party | Candidate | Votes | % | ±% |
|---|---|---|---|---|
| Country Liberal | Francis Maralampuwi Xavier | 1,308 | 43.1 | +6.6 |
| Labor | Dean Rioli | 1,104 | 36.4 | −9.7 |
| Greens | George Pascoe | 426 | 14.1 | +14.1 |
| First Nations | Jeannie Gadambua | 194 | 6.4 | +6.4 |
| Total formal votes | | 3,032 | 95.3 | +1.3 |
| Informal votes | | 148 | 4.7 | −1.3 |
| Turnout | | 3,180 | 58.1 | −2.8 |
Two-party-preferred result
| Country Liberal | Francis Maralampuwi Xavier | 1,547 | 51.0 | +15.0 |
| Labor | Dean Rioli | 1,485 | 49.0 | −15.0 |
| Country Liberal gain from Labor | | Swing | +15.0 | |

The Labor member for Arafura, Marion Scrymgour, announced her retirement from politics in March 2012, citing a desire to focus on community work. Having represented the seat since 2001, Scrymgour had been Deputy Chief Minister from 2007 to February 2009, when she resigned from the Labor Party after difficulties in her Education portfolio. Having rejoined the ALP in August following Alison Anderson's move to the crossbenches, Scrymgour's battle with thyroid cancer and the death of her father had contributed to a decreased public presence and she did not return to the ministry.

To replace Scrymgour, Labor nominated former Australian rules footballer Dean Rioli, whose uncle Maurice Rioli had been Scrymgour's predecessor in the seat. The Country Liberals endorsed the deputy chair of the Tiwi Land Council, Francis Maralampuwi Xavier, a fellow Tiwi Islander who was also related to Rioli; Xavier had been a former Labor preselection candidate who had defected to the conservative side of politics. The Greens nominated George Pascoe, who had previously contested the seat in 2005, while the new First Nations Party nominated Jeannie Gadambua.

Arafura was one of the seats that was too close to call on election night, and together with Stuart it remained in doubt for some days after the election. The CLP's sizeable primary vote lead was narrowed by a strong flow of Greens preferences to Labor, although the First Nations Party, in common with most other seats it contested, directed preferences to the CLP. Xavier led Rioli by 148 votes when election night counting finished, but this was narrowed to 47 during counting the following week. Xavier's final margin over Rioli was 62 votes, which amounted to a 15 per cent swing to the Country Liberals. This was the first time Labor had lost Arafura since its creation in 1983.

=== Araluen ===
2012 Northern Territory general election: Araluen
| Party | Candidate | Votes | % | ±% |
|---|---|---|---|---|
| Country Liberal | Robyn Lambley | 2,487 | 68.7 | +0.4 |
| Labor | Adam Findlay | 848 | 23.4 | +6.3 |
| First Nations | Edan Baxter | 285 | 7.9 | +7.9 |
| Total formal votes | | 3,620 | 96.4 | −1.2 |
| Informal votes | | 137 | 3.6 | +1.2 |
| Turnout | | 3,757 | 78.0 | −0.9 |
Two-party-preferred result
| Country Liberal | Robyn Lambley | 2,612 | 72.2 | −2.5 |
| Labor | Adam Findlay | 1,008 | 27.8 | +2.5 |
| Country Liberal hold | | Swing | −2.5 | |

The sitting member for Alice Springs-based Araluen, Robyn Lambley, had won the seat for the CLP at a 2010 by-election, triggered by the resignation of former opposition leader Jodeen Carney. The Labor candidate was local chef Adam Findlay, who had also contested the by-election. Araluen was the CLP's safest seat, although Findlay made opposition to the Angela Pamela uranium mine a central plank of his campaign. The First Nations Party nominated Edan Baxter, a musician, entrepreneur and former candidate for local council, who was one of the party's two non-indigenous candidates.

The absence of a Greens candidate saw all candidates increase their share of the primary vote. Araluen was one of four seats that saw a two-party-preferred swing towards Labor, together with Fannie Bay, Greatorex and Sanderson, although the result was an improvement on Lambley's by-election margin. Following the election, Lambley surprised observers by defeating existing deputy leader Kezia Purick in a party room ballot and becoming Deputy Chief Minister, a decision that was attributed to the desire to have a rural MP as the deputy.

=== Arnhem ===
2012 Northern Territory general election: Arnhem
| Party | Candidate | Votes | % | ±% |
|---|---|---|---|---|
| Country Liberal | Larisa Lee | 1,366 | 55.3 | n/a |
| Labor | Malarndirri McCarthy | 1,102 | 44.7 | n/a |
| Total formal votes | | 2,468 | 97.0 | n/a |
| Informal votes | | 76 | 3.0 | n/a |
| Turnout | | 2,544 | 51.9 | n/a |
| Country Liberal gain from Labor | | Swing | n/a | |

=== Barkly ===
2012 Northern Territory general election: Barkly
| Party | Candidate | Votes | % | ±% |
|---|---|---|---|---|
| Labor | Gerry McCarthy | 1,450 | 45.2 | −15.8 |
| Country Liberal | Rebecca Healy | 1,162 | 36.2 | +8.7 |
| First Nations | Valda Shannon | 467 | 14.5 | +14.5 |
| Independent | Stewart Wiley | 131 | 4.1 | +4.1 |
| Total formal votes | | 3,210 | 96.3 | +1.0 |
| Informal votes | | 122 | 3.7 | −1.0 |
| Turnout | | 3,332 | 64.9 | −0.2 |
Two-party-preferred result
| Labor | Gerry McCarthy | 1,849 | 57.6 | −8.0 |
| Country Liberal | Rebecca Healy | 1,485 | 42.4 | +8.0 |
| Labor hold | | Swing | −8.0 | |

=== Blain ===
2012 Northern Territory general election: Blain
| Party | Candidate | Votes | % | ±% |
|---|---|---|---|---|
| Country Liberal | Terry Mills | 2,462 | 61.6 | 0.0 |
| Labor | Geoff Bahnert | 1,343 | 33.6 | −4.9 |
| First Nations | Daniel Fejo | 194 | 4.9 | +4.9 |
| Total formal votes | | 3,999 | 96.6 | +1.7 |
| Informal votes | | 142 | 3.4 | −1.7 |
| Turnout | | 4,141 | 83.2 | +3.0 |
Two-party-preferred result
| Country Liberal | Terry Mills | 2,529 | 63.2 | +1.7 |
| Labor | Geoff Bahnert | 1,470 | 36.8 | −1.7 |
| Country Liberal hold | | Swing | +1.7 | |

=== Braitling ===
2012 Northern Territory general election: Braitling
| Party | Candidate | Votes | % | ±% |
|---|---|---|---|---|
| Country Liberal | Adam Giles | 2,372 | 67.6 | +9.3 |
| Labor | Deborah Rock | 613 | 17.5 | +4.7 |
| Greens | Barbara Shaw | 321 | 9.1 | −5.8 |
| Independent | Colin Furphy | 204 | 5.8 | +5.8 |
| Total formal votes | | 3,510 | 97.6 | +0.4 |
| Informal votes | | 88 | 2.4 | −0.4 |
| Turnout | | 3,598 | 76.8 | +3.4 |
Two-party-preferred result
| Country Liberal | Adam Giles | 2,585 | 73.6 | +0.2 |
| Labor | Deborah Rock | 925 | 26.4 | −0.2 |
| Country Liberal hold | | Swing | +0.2 | |

=== Brennan ===
2012 Northern Territory general election: Brennan
| Party | Candidate | Votes | % | ±% |
|---|---|---|---|---|
| Country Liberal | Peter Chandler | 2,683 | 64.2 | +11.6 |
| Labor | Russell Jeffrey | 1,493 | 35.8 | −11.6 |
| Total formal votes | | 4,176 | 97.7 | +1.9 |
| Informal votes | | 99 | 2.3 | −1.9 |
| Turnout | | 4,275 | 84.5 | +4.2 |
| Country Liberal hold | | Swing | +11.6 | |

=== Casuarina ===
2012 Northern Territory general election: Casuarina
| Party | Candidate | Votes | % | ±% |
|---|---|---|---|---|
| Labor | Kon Vatskalis | 2,512 | 59.3 | −4.9 |
| Country Liberal | Jane Jackson | 1,724 | 40.7 | +4.9 |
| Total formal votes | | 4,236 | 97.9 | +3.0 |
| Informal votes | | 89 | 2.1 | −3.0 |
| Turnout | | 4,325 | 86.0 | +1.9 |
| Labor hold | | Swing | −4.9 | |

=== Daly ===
2012 Northern Territory general election: Daly
| Party | Candidate | Votes | % | ±% |
|---|---|---|---|---|
| Country Liberal | Gary Higgins | 1,892 | 51.1 | +14.2 |
| Labor | Rob Knight | 1,445 | 39.0 | −7.9 |
| Greens | David Pollock | 187 | 5.1 | −3.8 |
| First Nations | Bill Risk | 109 | 2.9 | +2.9 |
| | Trevor Jenkins | 68 | 1.8 | +1.8 |
| Total formal votes | | 3,701 | 94.5 | −0.8 |
| Informal votes | | 214 | 5.5 | +0.8 |
| Turnout | | 3,915 | 73.5 | −0.5 |
Two-party-preferred result
| Country Liberal | Gary Higgins | 2,025 | 54.7 | +10.5 |
| Labor | Rob Knight | 1,676 | 45.3 | −10.5 |
| Country Liberal gain from Labor | | Swing | −4.9 | |

=== Drysdale ===
2012 Northern Territory general election: Drysdale
| Party | Candidate | Votes | % | ±% |
|---|---|---|---|---|
| Country Liberal | Lia Finocchiaro | 2,336 | 56.5 | +1.2 |
| Labor | James Burke | 1,142 | 27.6 | −6.9 |
| Independent | Ross Bohlin | 657 | 15.9 | +15.9 |
| Total formal votes | | 4,135 | 96.8 | +0.4 |
| Informal votes | | 137 | 3.2 | −0.4 |
| Turnout | | 4,272 | 82.5 | +2.6 |
Two-party-preferred result
| Country Liberal | Lia Finocchiaro | 2,699 | 65.3 | +5.1 |
| Labor | James Burke | 1,436 | 34.7 | −5.1 |
| Country Liberal hold | | Swing | +5.1 | |

=== Fannie Bay ===
2012 Northern Territory general election: Fannie Bay
| Party | Candidate | Votes | % | ±% |
|---|---|---|---|---|
| Labor | Michael Gunner | 1,945 | 48.8 | −2.3 |
| Country Liberal | Tony Clementson | 1,639 | 41.1 | −7.8 |
| Greens | Ken Bird | 403 | 10.1 | +10.1 |
| Total formal votes | | 3,987 | 97.3 | +2.6 |
| Informal votes | | 109 | 2.7 | −2.6 |
| Turnout | | 4,096 | 84.0 | +5.5 |
Two-party-preferred result
| Labor | Michael Gunner | 2,263 | 56.8 | +5.7 |
| Country Liberal | Tony Clementson | 1,724 | 43.2 | −5.7 |
| Labor hold | | Swing | +5.7 | |

=== Fong Lim ===
2012 Northern Territory general election: Fong Lim
| Party | Candidate | Votes | % | ±% |
|---|---|---|---|---|
| Country Liberal | Dave Tollner | 2,050 | 54.5 | +2.4 |
| Labor | Ashley Marsh | 1,348 | 35.8 | −12.1 |
| Greens | Matt Haubrick | 250 | 6.6 | +6.6 |
| Sex Party | Peter Burnheim | 113 | 3.0 | +3.0 |
| Total formal votes | | 3,761 | 97.0 | +2.2 |
| Informal votes | | 116 | 3.0 | −2.2 |
| Turnout | | 3,877 | 79.4 | +3.5 |
Two-party-preferred result
| Country Liberal | Dave Tollner | 2,154 | 57.3 | +5.2 |
| Labor | Ashley Marsh | 1,607 | 42.7 | −5.2 |
| Country Liberal hold | | Swing | +5.2 | |

=== Goyder ===
2012 Northern Territory general election: Goyder
| Party | Candidate | Votes | % | ±% |
|---|---|---|---|---|
| Country Liberal | Kezia Purick | 2,731 | 62.2 | +3.8 |
| Labor | Damian Smith | 1,291 | 29.4 | −12.2 |
| One Nation | John Kearney | 368 | 8.4 | +8.4 |
| Total formal votes | | 4,391 | 96.9 | +1.2 |
| Informal votes | | 142 | 3.1 | −1.2 |
| Turnout | | 4,533 | 85.2 | +2.0 |
Two-party-preferred result
| Country Liberal | Kezia Purick | 2,929 | 66.7 | +8.3 |
| Labor | Damian Smith | 1,462 | 33.3 | −8.3 |
| Country Liberal hold | | Swing | +8.3 | |

=== Greatorex ===
2012 Northern Territory general election: Greatorex
| Party | Candidate | Votes | % | ±% |
|---|---|---|---|---|
| Country Liberal | Matt Conlan | 1,991 | 56.7 | −4.5 |
| Labor | Rowan Foley | 673 | 19.2 | −1.2 |
| Independent | Phil Walcott | 512 | 14.6 | +14.6 |
| Greens | Evelyne Roullet | 338 | 9.6 | −8.8 |
| Total formal votes | | 3,514 | 97.3 | −0.3 |
| Informal votes | | 99 | 2.7 | +0.3 |
| Turnout | | 3,613 | 78.4 | +1.9 |
Two-party-preferred result
| Country Liberal | Matt Conlan | 2,278 | 64.8 | −1.7 |
| Labor | Rowan Foley | 1,236 | 35.2 | +1.7 |
| Country Liberal hold | | Swing | −1.7 | |

=== Johnston ===
2012 Northern Territory general election: Johnston
| Party | Candidate | Votes | % | ±% |
|---|---|---|---|---|
| Labor | Ken Vowles | 1,799 | 45.0 | −13.1 |
| Country Liberal | Jo Sangster | 1,552 | 38.8 | −3.1 |
| Greens | Alana Parrott-Jolly | 389 | 9.7 | +9.7 |
| Sex Party | Krystal Metcalf | 169 | 4.2 | +4.2 |
| One Nation | Peter Bussa | 89 | 2.2 | +2.2 |
| Total formal votes | | 3,998 | 96.2 | +1.2 |
| Informal votes | | 160 | 2.5 | −1.2 |
| Turnout | | 4,158 | 85.2 | +2.7 |
Two-party-preferred result
| Labor | Ken Vowles | 2,225 | 55.7 | −2.5 |
| Country Liberal | Jo Sangster | 1,773 | 44.3 | +2.5 |
| Labor hold | | Swing | −2.5 | |

=== Karama ===
2012 Northern Territory general election: Karama
| Party | Candidate | Votes | % | ±% |
|---|---|---|---|---|
| Labor | Delia Lawrie | 2,072 | 52.7 | −3.5 |
| Country Liberal | Rohan Kelly | 1,634 | 41.5 | +6.6 |
| Greens | Frances Elcoate | 229 | 5.8 | +5.8 |
| Total formal votes | | 3,935 | 96.4 | +0.5 |
| Informal votes | | 145 | 3.6 | −0.5 |
| Turnout | | 4,080 | 86.6 | +2.6 |
Two-party-preferred result
| Labor | Delia Lawrie | 2,219 | 56.4 | −4.4 |
| Country Liberal | Rohan Kelly | 1,716 | 43.6 | +4.4 |
| Labor hold | | Swing | −4.4 | |

=== Katherine ===
2012 Northern Territory general election: Katherine
| Party | Candidate | Votes | % | ±% |
|---|---|---|---|---|
| Country Liberal | Willem Westra van Holthe | 2,729 | 66.1 | +15.1 |
| Labor | Cerise King | 864 | 20.9 | −10.5 |
| Independent | Teresa Cummings | 537 | 13.0 | +13.0 |
| Total formal votes | | 4,130 | 98.2 | +1.5 |
| Informal votes | | 77 | 1.8 | −1.5 |
| Turnout | | 4,207 | 81.3 | +5.5 |
Two-party-preferred result
| Country Liberal | Willem Westra van Holthe | 2,984 | 72.3 | +13.8 |
| Labor | Cerise King | 1,146 | 27.7 | −13.8 |
| Country Liberal hold | | Swing | +13.8 | |

=== Namatjira ===
2012 Northern Territory general election: Namatjira
| Party | Candidate | Votes | % | ±% |
|---|---|---|---|---|
| Country Liberal | Alison Anderson | 1,847 | 63.2 | n/a |
| Labor | Des Rogers | 824 | 28.2 | n/a |
| First Nations | Warren H Williams | 253 | 8.7 | n/a |
| Total formal votes | | 2,924 | 95.3 | n/a |
| Informal votes | | 143 | 4.7 | n/a |
| Turnout | | 3,067 | 59.8 | n/a |
Two-party-preferred result
| Country Liberal | Alison Anderson | 2,006 | 68.6 | n/a |
| Labor | Des Rogers | 918 | 31.4 | n/a |
| Country Liberal hold | | Swing | n/a | |

=== Nelson ===
2012 Northern Territory general election: Nelson
| Party | Candidate | Votes | % | ±% |
|---|---|---|---|---|
| Independent | Gerry Wood | 1,988 | 54.0 | −18.2 |
| Country Liberal | Judy Cole | 1,436 | 39.0 | +19.9 |
| Labor | Sharon McAlear | 255 | 6.9 | −1.7 |
| Total formal votes | | 3,679 | 98.1 | +0.5 |
| Informal votes | | 72 | 1.9 | −0.5 |
| Turnout | | 3,751 | 79.6 | +5.0 |
Notional two-party-preferred count
| Country Liberal | Judy Cole | 2,477 | 67.3 | −1.3 |
| Labor | Sharon McAlear | 1,203 | 32.7 | +1.3 |
Two-candidate-preferred result
| Independent | Gerry Wood | 2,177 | 59.2 | −19.5 |
| Country Liberal | Judy Cole | 1,502 | 40.8 | +19.5 |
| Independent hold | | Swing | −19.5 | |

=== Nhulunbuy ===
2012 Northern Territory general election: Nhulunbuy
| Party | Candidate | Votes | % | ±% |
|---|---|---|---|---|
| Labor | Lynne Walker | 1,554 | 55.0 | −19.1 |
| Country Liberal | Allen Fanning | 641 | 22.7 | −3.1 |
| Independent | Kendall Trudgen | 629 | 22.3 | +22.3 |
| Total formal votes | | 2,824 | 95.4 | −0.8 |
| Informal votes | | 136 | 4.6 | +0.8 |
| Turnout | | 2,960 | 62.7 | +2.9 |
Two-party-preferred result
| Labor | Lynne Walker | 1,948 | 69.0 | −5.2 |
| Country Liberal | Allen Fanning | 876 | 31.0 | +5.2 |
| Labor hold | | Swing | −5.2 | |

=== Nightcliff ===
2012 Northern Territory general election: Nightcliff
| Party | Candidate | Votes | % | ±% |
|---|---|---|---|---|
| Labor | Natasha Fyles | 1,389 | 35.7 | −7.3 |
| Country Liberal | Kim Loveday | 1,260 | 32.4 | −0.9 |
| Independent | Stuart Blanch | 722 | 18.5 | +18.5 |
| Greens | Owen Gale | 263 | 6.8 | −17.0 |
| Independent | Peter Rudge | 170 | 4.4 | +4.4 |
| Sex Party | Felicity Wardle | 74 | 1.9 | +1.9 |
| Independent | Andrew Arthur | 16 | 0.4 | +0.4 |
| Total formal votes | | 3,894 | 96.6 | −0.3 |
| Informal votes | | 136 | 3.4 | +0.3 |
| Turnout | | 4,030 | 84.0 | +5.2 |
Two-party-preferred result
| Labor | Natasha Fyles | 2,304 | 59.2 | −1.5 |
| Country Liberal | Kim Loveday | 1,590 | 40.8 | +1.5 |
| Labor hold | | Swing | −1.5 | |

=== Port Darwin ===
2012 Northern Territory general election: Port Darwin
| Party | Candidate | Votes | % | ±% |
|---|---|---|---|---|
| Country Liberal | John Elferink | 2,023 | 55.5 | +8.7 |
| Labor | Alan James | 1,205 | 33.0 | −4.0 |
| Greens | David Andrews | 233 | 18.5 | −9.8 |
| Sex Party | Rowena Leunig | 185 | 5.1 | +5.1 |
| Total formal votes | | 3,646 | 97.4 | +0.5 |
| Informal votes | | 96 | 2.6 | −0.5 |
| Turnout | | 3,742 | 79.1 | +6.7 |
Two-party-preferred result
| Country Liberal | John Elferink | 2,173 | 59.6 | +6.8 |
| Labor | Alan James | 1,473 | 40.4 | −6.8 |
| Country Liberal hold | | Swing | +6.8 | |

=== Sanderson ===
2012 Northern Territory general election: Sanderson
| Party | Candidate | Votes | % | ±% |
|---|---|---|---|---|
| Country Liberal | Peter Styles | 2,214 | 50.9 | −5.6 |
| Labor | Jodie Green | 1,872 | 43.0 | −0.6 |
| Sex Party | Jillian Briggs | 176 | 4.0 | +4.0 |
| First Nations | Dimitrious Magriplis | 90 | 2.1 | +2.1 |
| Total formal votes | | 4,352 | 97.1 | +2.9 |
| Informal votes | | 132 | 2.9 | −2.9 |
| Turnout | | 4,484 | 87.7 | +1.1 |
Two-party-preferred result
| Country Liberal | Peter Styles | 2,312 | 53.1 | −3.3 |
| Labor | Jodie Green | 2,040 | 46.9 | +3.3 |
| Country Liberal hold | | Swing | −3.3 | |

=== Stuart ===
2012 Northern Territory general election: Stuart
| Party | Candidate | Votes | % | ±% |
|---|---|---|---|---|
| Country Liberal | Bess Price | 1,291 | 46.4 | +11.5 |
| Labor | Karl Hampton | 1,035 | 37.2 | −27.9 |
| First Nations | Maurie Ryan | 456 | 16.4 | +16.4 |
| Total formal votes | | 2,782 | 94.1 | −1.5 |
| Informal votes | | 176 | 5.9 | +1.5 |
| Turnout | | 2,958 | 62.9 | +10.1 |
Two-party-preferred result
| Country Liberal | Bess Price | 1,489 | 53.5 | +18.6 |
| Labor | Karl Hampton | 1,293 | 46.5 | −18.6 |
| Country Liberal gain from Labor | | Swing | +18.6 | |

=== Wanguri ===
2012 Northern Territory general election: Wanguri
| Party | Candidate | Votes | % | ±% |
|---|---|---|---|---|
| Labor | Paul Henderson | 2,416 | 57.0 | −3.7 |
| Country Liberal | Rhianna Harker | 1,823 | 43.0 | +12.9 |
| Total formal votes | | 4,239 | 98.0 | +1.0 |
| Informal votes | | 86 | 2.0 | −1.0 |
| Turnout | | 4,325 | 89.1 | +5.1 |
| Labor hold | | Swing | −3.7 | |
