= Electoral results for the division of Stuart =

This is a list of electoral results for the Electoral division of Stuart in Northern Territory elections.

== Members for Stuart ==
Member	Party	Term
Roger Vale	Country Liberal	1974–1983
Brian Ede	Labor	1983–1996
Peter Toyne	Labor	1996–2006
Karl Hampton	Labor	2006–2012
Bess Price	Country Liberal	2012–2016
Scott McConnell	Labor	2016–2019
Scott McConnell	Independent	2019–2020

== Election results ==
=== Elections in the 2010s ===
2016 Northern Territory general election: Stuart
Party	Candidate	Votes	%	±%
Labor	Scott McConnell	1,937	67.4	+32.2
Country Liberal	Bess Price	590	20.5	−26.2
Independent	Maurie Ryan	228	7.9	+7.9
1 Territory	Andi Bracey	119	4.1	+4.1
Total formal votes		2,874	98.9	+4.3
Informal votes		32	1.1	−4.3
Turnout		2,906	55.4	−9.8
Two-party-preferred result
Labor	Scott McConnell	2,114	75.4	+30.9
Country Liberal	Bess Price	690	24.6	−30.9
Labor gain from Country Liberal		Swing	+30.9	

2012 Northern Territory general election: Stuart
Party	Candidate	Votes	%	±%
Country Liberal	Bess Price	1,291	46.4	+11.5
Labor	Karl Hampton	1,035	37.2	−27.9
First Nations	Maurie Ryan	456	16.4	+16.4
Total formal votes		2,782	94.1	−1.5
Informal votes		176	5.9	+1.5
Turnout		2,958	62.9	+10.1
Two-party-preferred result
Country Liberal	Bess Price	1,489	53.5	+18.6
Labor	Karl Hampton	1,293	46.5	−18.6
Country Liberal gain from Labor		Swing	+18.6	

=== Elections in the 2000s ===
2008 Northern Territory general election: Stuart
Party	Candidate	Votes	%	±%
Labor	Karl Hampton	1,470	65.1	−3.9
Country Liberal	Rex Japanangka	789	34.9	+3.9
Total formal votes		2,259	95.5	+0.3
Informal votes		106	4.5	−0.3
Turnout		2,365	52.8	
Labor hold		Swing	−3.9	

2006 Stuart by-election
Party	Candidate	Votes	%	±%
Labor	Karl Hampton	1,180	57.1	−14.2
Independent	Gary Cartwright	287	13.9	+13.9
Country Liberal	Rex Granites Japanangka	233	11.3	§
Country Liberal	Lloyd Spencer-Nelson	186	9.0	§
Independent	Anna Machado	157	7.6	+7.6
Independent	Peter Wilson	22	1.1	+1.1
Total formal votes		2,065	86.4	−9.0
Informal votes		324	13.6	+9.0
Turnout		2,389	53.9	−5.4
Two-party-preferred result
Labor	Karl Hampton	1,396	67.6	−3.7
Country Liberal	Rex Granites Japanangka	669	32.4	+3.7
Labor hold		Swing	−3.7	

2005 Northern Territory general election: Stuart
Party	Candidate	Votes	%	±%
Labor	Peter Toyne	1,717	71.0	+4.3
Country Liberal	Anna Machado	702	29.0	−1.9
Total formal votes		2,419	95.4	−0.2
Informal votes		116	4.6	+0.2
Turnout		2,535	59.3	
Labor hold		Swing	+3.2	

2001 Northern Territory general election: Stuart
Party	Candidate	Votes	%	±%
Labor	Peter Toyne	1,453	71.3	+20.4
Country Liberal	Ken Lechleitner	586	28.7	−20.4
Total formal votes		2,039	95.4	+2.0
Informal votes		98	4.6	−2.0
Turnout		2,137	58.0	
Labor hold		Swing	+20.4	

=== Elections in the 1990s ===
1997 Northern Territory general election: Stuart
Party	Candidate	Votes	%	±%
Labor	Peter Toyne	1,190	51.5	−0.4
Country Liberal	John Bohning	1,120	48.5	+0.4
Total formal votes		2,310	93.8	
Informal votes		152	6.2	
Turnout		2,462	62.4	
Labor hold		Swing	−0.4	

1996 Stuart by-election
Party	Candidate	Votes	%	±%
Labor	Peter Toyne	1,275	55.2	+3.4
Country Liberal	Tony Bohning	1,033	44.8	−3.4
Total formal votes		2,308	95.0	−0.2
Informal votes		122	5.0	+0.2
Turnout		2,430	63.7	−3.0
Labor hold		Swing	+3.4	

1994 Northern Territory general election: Stuart
Party	Candidate	Votes	%	±%
Labor	Brian Ede	1,228	51.8	−2.8
Country Liberal	John Bohning	1,140	48.2	+23.5
Total formal votes		2,368	95.2	
Informal votes		118	4.8	
Turnout		2,486	66.7	
Labor hold		Swing	−7.9	

1990 Northern Territory general election: Stuart
Party	Candidate	Votes	%	±%
Labor	Brian Ede	1,186	54.6	
Country Liberal	Eric Pananka	537	24.7	
Country Liberal	Alexander Nelson	450	20.7	
Total formal votes		2,173	94.8	
Informal votes		120	5.2	
Turnout		2,293	72.0	
Two-party-preferred result
Labor	Brian Ede	1,456	67.0	+5.9
Country Liberal	Eric Pananka	717	33.0	−5.9
Labor hold		Swing	+5.9	

=== Elections in the 1980s ===
1987 Northern Territory general election: Stuart
Party	Candidate	Votes	%	±%
Labor	Brian Ede	698	55.0	−9.3
Country Liberal	Jim Sinclair	261	20.6	−15.1
NT Nationals	Ian Drennan	156	12.3	+12.3
Independent	Vince Forrester	154	12.1	+12.1
Total formal votes		1,269	83.8	
Informal votes		234	16.2	
Turnout		1,514	55.3	
Two-party-preferred result
Labor	Brian Ede	878	69.2	+5.2
Country Liberal	Jim Sinclair	391	30.8	−5.2
Labor hold		Swing	+5.2	

1983 Northern Territory general election: Stuart
Party	Candidate	Votes	%	±%
Labor	Brian Ede	910	64.3	
Country Liberal	Bobby Liddle	506	35.7	
Total formal votes		1,416	95.1	
Informal votes		73	4.9	
Turnout		1,489	64.4	
Labor hold		Swing		

1980 Northern Territory general election: Stuart
Party	Candidate	Votes	%	±%
Country Liberal	Roger Vale	1,564	59.9	+7.8
Labor	John Thomas	1,047	40.1	−2.3
Total formal votes		2,611	98.0	
Informal votes		54	2.0	
Turnout		2,665	71.2	
Country Liberal hold		Swing	N/A	

=== Elections in the 1970s ===
1977 Northern Territory general election: Stuart
Party	Candidate	Votes	%	±%
Country Liberal	Roger Vale	1,042	52.1	
Labor	Trevor Cutter	849	42.4	
Progress	Kenneth Kitto	111	5.5	
Total formal votes		2,002	96.7	
Informal votes		69	3.3	
Turnout		2,071	70.9	
Country Liberal hold		Swing		

- Preferences were not distributed.

1974 Northern Territory general election: Stuart
Party	Candidate	Votes	%	±%
Country Liberal	Roger Vale	498	47.7	
Labor	Geoffrey Loveday	301	28.8	
Independent	Reginald Harris	246	23.5	
Total formal votes		1,045	94.9	
Informal votes		56	5.1	
Turnout		1,101	71.1	
Two-party-preferred result
Country Liberal	Roger Vale	644	64.8	
Labor	Geoffrey Loveday	349	35.2	
Country Liberal win		(new seat)		
