= Electoral results for the division of Johnston =

This is a list of electoral results for the electoral division of Johnston in Northern Territory elections.

== Members for Johnston ==
Member	Party	Term
Chris Burns	Labor	2001–2012
Ken Vowles	Labor	2012–2020
Joel Bowden	Labor	2020–present

== Election results ==
=== Elections in the 2000s ===
2001 Northern Territory general election: Johnston
Party	Candidate	Votes	%	±%
Labor	Chris Burns	1,625	46.2	+9.5
Country Liberal	Steve Balch	1,542	43.9	−7.6
Democrats	Joanne Sangster	347	9.9	+9.9
Total formal votes		3,514	96.9	+0.8
Informal votes		113	3.1	−0.8
Turnout		3,627	83.9	
Two-party-preferred result
Labor	Chris Burns	1,858	52.9	+9.2
Country Liberal	Steve Balch	1,656	47.1	−9.2
Labor gain from Country Liberal		Swing	+9.2	

2005 Northern Territory general election: Johnston
Party	Candidate	Votes	%	±%
Labor	Chris Burns	1,977	55.0	+8.8
Country Liberal	Ross Connolly	1,071	29.8	−14.1
Greens	Kate Neely	358	10.0	+10.0
Independent	Steve Saint	148	4.1	+4.1
Independent	Gary Meyerhoff	38	1.1	+1.1
Total formal votes		3,592	96.9	±0.0
Informal votes		114	3.1	±0.0
Turnout		3,706	86.9	+3.0
Two-party-preferred result
Labor	Chris Burns	2,355	65.6	+12.7
Country Liberal	Ross Connolly	1,237	34.4	−12.7
Labor hold		Swing	+12.7	

2008 Northern Territory general election: Johnston
Party	Candidate	Votes	%	±%
Labor	Chris Burns	2,246	58.1	−8.7
Country Liberal	Jo Sangster	1,618	41.9	+8.7
Total formal votes		3,864	95.0	−2.3
Informal votes		205	5.0	+2.3
Turnout		4,069	82.5	−4.4
Labor hold		Swing	−8.7	

=== Elections in the 2010s ===
2012 Northern Territory general election: Johnston
Party	Candidate	Votes	%	±%
Labor	Ken Vowles	1,799	45.0	−13.1
Country Liberal	Jo Sangster	1,552	38.8	−3.1
Greens	Alana Parrott-Jolly	389	9.7	+9.7
Sex Party	Krystal Metcalf	169	4.2	+4.2
One Nation	Peter Bussa	89	2.2	+2.2
Total formal votes		3,998	96.2	+1.2
Informal votes		160	2.5	−1.2
Turnout		4,158	85.2	+2.7
Two-party-preferred result
Labor	Ken Vowles	2,225	55.7	−2.5
Country Liberal	Jo Sangster	1,773	44.3	+2.5
Labor hold		Swing	−2.5	

2016 Northern Territory general election: Johnston
Party	Candidate	Votes	%	±%
Labor	Ken Vowles	2,019	51.4	+3.6
Country Liberal	Steven Klose	1,234	31.4	−7.6
Greens	Melanie Ross	676	17.2	+9.3
Total formal votes		3,929	98.1	+1.6
Informal votes		77	1.9	−1.6
Turnout		4,006	80.4	+0.8
Two-party-preferred result
Labor	Ken Vowles	2,453	64.7	+8.1
Country Liberal	Steven Klose	1,339	35.3	−8.1
Labor hold		Swing	+8.1	

=== Elections in the 2020s ===
2020 Johnston by-election
Party	Candidate	Votes	%	±%
Labor	Joel Bowden	983	29.9	−21.5
Territory Alliance	Steven Klose	728	22.1	+22.1
Greens	Aiya Goodrich Carttling	565	17.2	−0.0
Country Liberal	Josh Thomas	536	16.3	−15.1
Ban Fracking Fix Crime Protect Water	Braedon Earley	343	10.4	+10.4
Independent	Trevor Jenkins	80	2.4	+2.4
Independent	George Mamouzellos	57	1.7	+1.7
Total formal votes		3,292	96.4	−1.7
Informal votes		123	3.6	+1.7
Turnout		3,415	68.5	−11.9
Two-candidate-preferred result
Labor	Joel Bowden	1,731	52.6	−12.1
Territory Alliance	Steven Klose	1,561	47.4	+47.4
Labor hold		Swing	N/A	

2020 Northern Territory general election: Johnston
Party	Candidate	Votes	%	±%
Labor	Joel Bowden	1,940	45.3	−7.7
Country Liberal	Gary Haslett	843	19.7	−10.7
Greens	Aiya Goodrich Carttling	736	17.2	+1.9
Territory Alliance	Steven Klose	626	14.6	+14.6
Independent	Joshua Thomas	139	3.2	+3.2
Total formal votes		4,284	96.6	N/A
Informal votes		150	3.4	N/A
Turnout		4,434	79.8	N/A
Two-party-preferred result
Labor	Joel Bowden	2,851	66.5	+0.8
Country Liberal	Gary Haslett	1,433	33.5	−0.8
Labor hold		Swing	+0.8	

2024 Northern Territory general election: Johnston
Party	Candidate	Votes	%	±%
Country Liberal	Gary Strachan	1,456	34.6	+14.3
Independent	Justine Davis	1,273	30.3	+30.3
Labor	Joel Bowden	1,108	26.3	−19.6
Greens	Billie Barton	370	8.8	−7.0
Total formal votes		4,207	98.2	+1.2
Informal votes		120	2.8	−1.2
Turnout		4,327	75.3	
Two-party-preferred result (Note: Estimated two-party-preferred count by Antony Green.)
Labor	Joel Bowden	2,224	52.9	−13.1
Country Liberal	Gary Strachan	1,983	47.1	+13.1
Two-candidate-preferred result
Independent	Justine Davis	2,425	57.6	+57.6
Country Liberal	Gary Strachan	1,782	42.4	+8.4
Independent gain from Labor		Swing	+57.6	
