= Electoral results for the division of Greatorex =

Electoral results

This is a list of electoral results for the Electoral division of Greatorex in Northern Territory elections.

== Members for Greatorex ==
Member	Party	Term
Denis Collins	Independent	1990–1994
Richard Lim	Country Liberal Party	1994–2007
Matt Conlan	Country Liberal Party	2007–2016

== Election results ==
=== Elections in the 2010s ===
2012 Northern Territory general election: Greatorex
Party	Candidate	Votes	%	±%
Country Liberal	Matt Conlan	1,991	56.7	−4.5
Labor	Rowan Foley	673	19.2	−1.2
Independent	Phil Walcott	512	14.6	+14.6
Greens	Evelyne Roullet	338	9.6	−8.8
Total formal votes		3,514	97.3	−0.3
Informal votes		99	2.7	+0.3
Turnout		3,613	78.4	+1.9
Two-party-preferred result
Country Liberal	Matt Conlan	2,278	64.8	−1.7
Labor	Rowan Foley	1,236	35.2	+1.7
Country Liberal hold		Swing	−1.7	

=== Elections in the 2000s ===
2008 Northern Territory general election: Greatorex
Party	Candidate	Votes	%	±%
Country Liberal	Matt Conlan	2,205	61.2	+13.6
Labor	Jo Nixon	735	20.4	−21.7
Greens	Lenny Aronsten	664	18.4	+8.1
Total formal votes		3,604	97.6	+0.1
Informal votes		89	2.4	−0.1
Turnout		3,693	76.6	
Two-party-preferred result
Country Liberal	Matt Conlan	2,396	66.5	+16.1
Labor	Jo Nixon	1,208	33.5	−16.1
Country Liberal hold		Swing	+16.1	

2007 Greatorex by-election
Party	Candidate	Votes	%	±%
Country Liberal	Matt Conlan	1,764	53.6	+5.1
Independent	Paul Herrick	670	20.4	+20.4
Labor	Jo Nixon	541	16.4	−24.4
Greens	Jane Clark	316	9.6	−1.1
Total formal votes		3,261	97.8	+0.3
Informal votes		75	2.2	−0.3
Turnout		3,366	73.8	−12.5
Two-party-preferred result
Country Liberal	Matt Conlan	2,150	65.3	+14.0
Labor	Jo Nixon	1,141	34.7	−14.0
Two-candidate-preferred result
Country Liberal	Matt Conlan	1,899	57.8	+6.4
Independent	Paul Herrick	1,392	42.3	+42.3
Country Liberal hold		Swing	+6.4	

2005 Northern Territory general election: Greatorex
Party	Candidate	Votes	%	±%
Country Liberal	Richard Lim	1,848	48.5	−2.7
Labor	Fran Kilgariff	1,556	40.8	+6.5
Greens	David Mortimer	407	10.7	+10.7
Total formal votes		3,811	97.5	+0.4
Informal votes		97	2.5	−0.4
Turnout		3,908	86.3	
Two-party-preferred result
Country Liberal	Richard Lim	1,958	51.4	−7.6
Labor	Fran Kilgariff	1,853	48.6	+7.6
Country Liberal hold		Swing	−7.6	

2001 Northern Territory general election: Greatorex
Party	Candidate	Votes	%	±%
Country Liberal	Richard Lim	1,801	51.1	−9.0
Labor	Peter Kavanagh	1,210	34.3	−3.4
Independent	David Mortimer	512	14.5	+14.5
Total formal votes		3,523	97.1	+2.4
Informal votes		106	2.9	−2.4
Turnout		3,629	81.0	
Two-party-preferred result
Country Liberal	Richard Lim	2,075	58.9	−2.4
Labor	Peter Kavanagh	1,448	41.1	+2.4
Country Liberal hold		Swing	−2.4	

=== Elections in the 1990s ===
1997 Northern Territory general election: Greatorex
Party	Candidate	Votes	%	±%
Country Liberal	Richard Lim	1,853	60.5	+16.6
Labor	Peter Kavanagh	1,211	39.5	+10.1
Total formal votes		3,231	94.8	
Informal votes		167	5.2	
Turnout		3,398	89.7	
Country Liberal hold		Swing	−1.8	

1994 Northern Territory general election: Greatorex
Party	Candidate	Votes	%	±%
Country Liberal	Richard Lim	1,371	43.9	+12.2
Labor	Kerrie Nelson	918	29.4	+7.7
Independent	Denis Collins	835	26.7	−5.0
Total formal votes		3,124	98.2	
Informal votes		56	1.8	
Turnout		3,180	85.4	
Two-party-preferred result
Country Liberal	Richard Lim	1,945	62.3	−10.8
Labor	Kerrie Nelson	1,179	37.7	+10.8
Country Liberal gain from Independent		Swing	N/A	

1990 Northern Territory general election: Greatorex
Party	Candidate	Votes	%	±%
Country Liberal	Robert Kennedy	1,087	39.6	
Independent	Denis Collins	869	31.7	
Labor	Harold Furber	594	21.7	
NT Nationals	David Johannsen	193	7.0	
Total formal votes		2,743	97.4	
Informal votes		74	2.6	
Turnout		2,817	81.3	
Two-party-preferred result
Country Liberal	Robert Kennedy	1,927	70.3	+10.4
Labor	Harold Furber	816	29.7	−10.4
Two-candidate-preferred result
Independent	Denis Collins	1,439	52.5	
Country Liberal	Robert Kennedy	1,304	47.5	
Independent hold		Swing	N/A	
