= Electoral results for the division of Araluen =

This is a list of electoral results for the Electoral division of Araluen in Northern Territory elections.

== Members for Araluen ==
Member	Party	Term
Jim Robertson	Country Liberal	1983–1986
Eric Poole	Country Liberal	1986–2001
Jodeen Carney	Country Liberal	2001–2010
Robyn Lambley	Country Liberal	2010–2015
Robyn Lambley	Independent	2015–2020
Robyn Lambley	Territory Alliance	March 2020– October 2020
Robyn Lambley	Independent	2020–present

== Election results ==
=== Elections in the 2020s ===
2024 Northern Territory general election: Araluen
Party	Candidate	Votes	%	±%
Independent	Robyn Lambley	1,638	40.7	+11.5
Country Liberal	Sean Heenan	1,062	26.4	−11.6
Greens	Hugo Wells	666	16.6	+6.1
Labor	Gagandeep Sodhi	536	13.3	−4.7
Independent	Wayne Wright	119	3.0	+1.4
Total formal votes		4,021	96.5	−0.0
Informal votes		144	3.5	+0.0
Turnout		4,165	70.7	−8.0
Two-party-preferred result (Note: Estimated two-party-preferred count by Antony Green.)
Country Liberal	Sean Heenan	2,481	61.7	−0.9
Labor	Gagandeep Sodhi	1,540	38.3	+0.9
Two-candidate-preferred result
Independent	Robyn Lambley	2,603	64.7	+14.3
Country Liberal	Sean Heenan	1,418	35.3	−14.3
Independent hold		Swing	+14.3	

2020 Northern Territory general election: Araluen
Party	Candidate	Votes	%	±%
Country Liberal	Damien Ryan	1,659	38.0	+1.6
Territory Alliance	Robyn Lambley	1,276	29.2	−10.5
Labor	Jackson Ankers	789	18.1	−5.8
Greens	Bernard Hickey	455	10.4	+10.4
Federation	Domenico Pecorari	114	2.6	+2.6
Independent	Wayne Wright	71	1.6	+1.6
Total formal votes		4,364	96.5	N/A
Informal votes		157	3.5	N/A
Turnout		4,521	78.7	N/A
Two-party-preferred result (Note: Estimated two-party count by Antony Green.)
Country Liberal	Damien Ryan	2,732	62.6	+6.9
Labor	Jackson Ankers	1,632	37.4	−6.9
Two-candidate-preferred result
Territory Alliance	Robyn Lambley	2,203	50.5	−8.1
Country Liberal	Damien Ryan	2,161	49.5	+8.1
Territory Alliance hold		Swing	−8.1	

=== Elections in the 2010s ===
2016 Northern Territory general election: Araluen
Party	Candidate	Votes	%	±%
Independent	Robyn Lambley	1,835	38.9	+38.9
Country Liberal	Stephen Brown	1,720	36.4	−28.5
Labor	Adam Findlay	1,165	24.7	+2.9
Total formal votes		4,720	97.8	N/A
Informal votes		106	2.2	N/A
Turnout		4,826	82.5	N/A
Two-party-preferred result
Country Liberal	Stephen Brown	2,308	55.3	−14.7
Labor	Adam Findlay	1,868	44.7	+14.7
Two-candidate-preferred result
Independent	Robyn Lambley	2,604	58.2	+58.2
Country Liberal	Stephen Brown	1,873	41.8	−28.1
Independent gain from Country Liberal		Swing	N/A	

2012 Northern Territory general election: Araluen
Party	Candidate	Votes	%	±%
Country Liberal	Robyn Lambley	2,487	68.7	+0.4
Labor	Adam Findlay	848	23.4	+6.3
First Nations	Edan Baxter	285	7.9	+7.9
Total formal votes		3,620	96.4	N/A
Informal votes		137	3.6	N/A
Turnout		3,757	78.0	N/A
Two-party-preferred result
Country Liberal	Robyn Lambley	2,612	72.2	−2.5
Labor	Adam Findlay	1,008	27.8	+2.5
Country Liberal hold		Swing	−2.5	

2010 Araluen by-election
Party	Candidate	Votes	%	±%
Country Liberal	Robyn Lambley	1,935	68.0	−0.3
Labor	Adam Findlay	909	32.0	+14.9
Total formal votes		2,844	95.6	N/A
Informal votes		131	4.4	N/A
Turnout		2,975	59.2	N/A
Country Liberal hold		Swing	−0.3	

=== Elections in the 2000s ===
2008 Northern Territory general election: Araluen
Party	Candidate	Votes	%	±%
Country Liberal	Jodeen Carney	2,470	68.3	+14.4
Labor	John Gaynor	618	17.1	−19.4
Greens	Linda Chellew	526	14.6	+5.4
Total formal votes		3,614	97.6	N/A
Informal votes		90	2.4	N/A
Turnout		3,704	74.6	N/A
Two-party-preferred result
Country Liberal	Jodeen Carney	2,699	74.7	+17.2
Labor	John Gaynor	915	25.3	−17.2
Country Liberal hold		Swing	+17.2	

2005 Northern Territory general election: Araluen
Party	Candidate	Votes	%	±%
Country Liberal	Jodeen Carney	1,945	53.9	+12.8
Labor	John Gaynor	1,332	36.9	+4.5
Greens	Alan Tyley	333	9.2	+9.2
Total formal votes		3,610	97.0	N/A
Informal votes		110	3.0	N/A
Turnout		3,720	82.1	+1.8
Two-party-preferred result
Country Liberal	Jodeen Carney	2,067	57.3	+5.3
Labor	John Gaynor	1,543	42.7	−5.3
Country Liberal hold		Swing	+5.3	

2001 Northern Territory general election: Araluen
Party	Candidate	Votes	%	±%
Country Liberal	Jodeen Carney	1,386	41.1	−27.1
Labor	Michael Bowden	1,094	32.4	+2.3
Independent	John Bohning	450	13.3	+13.3
Independent	Meredith Campbell	444	13.2	+13.2
Total formal votes		3,374	95.6	N/A
Informal votes		154	4.4	N/A
Turnout		3,528	80.3	N/A
Two-party-preferred result
Country Liberal	Jodeen Carney	1,754	52.0	−17.1
Labor	Michael Bowden	1,620	48.0	+17.1
Country Liberal hold		Swing	−17.1	

=== Elections in the 1990s ===
1997 Northern Territory general election: Araluen
Party	Candidate	Votes	%	±%
Country Liberal	Eric Poole	2,065	69.2	−0.9
Labor	Lilliah McCulloch	919	30.8	+0.9
Total formal votes		2,984	93.1	N/A
Informal votes		223	6.9	N/A
Turnout		3,207	84.1	N/A
Country Liberal hold		Swing	−0.9	

1994 Northern Territory general election: Araluen
Party	Candidate	Votes	%	±%
Country Liberal	Eric Poole	2,091	70.1	+13.0
Labor	Mescal Yates	892	29.9	+11.5
Total formal votes		2,983	95.5	N/A
Informal votes		140	4.5	N/A
Turnout		3,123	83.4	N/A
Country Liberal hold		Swing	−0.5	

1990 Northern Territory general election: Araluen
Party	Candidate	Votes	%	±%
Country Liberal	Eric Poole	1,634	57.1	+13.5
Labor	Brian Doolan	702	24.5	−4.4
NT Nationals	Enzo Floreani	527	18.4	−9.1
Total formal votes		2,863	97.5	N/A
Informal votes		73	2.5	N/A
Turnout		2,936	86.2	N/A
Two-party-preferred result
Country Liberal	Eric Poole	2,029	70.9	+6.7
Labor	Brian Doolan	834	29.1	−6.7
Country Liberal hold		Swing	+6.7	

=== Elections in the 1980s ===
1987 Northern Territory general election: Araluen
Party	Candidate	Votes	%	±%
Country Liberal	Eric Poole	871	43.6	−18.1
Labor	Di Shanahan	577	28.9	+11.0
NT Nationals	Enzo Floreani	550	27.5	+27.5
Total formal votes		1,998	97.3	N/A
Informal votes		55	2.7	N/A
Turnout		2,053	77.3	N/A
Two-party-preferred result
Country Liberal	Eric Poole	1,284	64.2	−7.7
Labor	Di Shanahan	714	35.7	+7.7
Country Liberal hold		Swing	−7.7	

1986 Araluen by-election
Party	Candidate	Votes	%	±%
Country Liberal	Eric Poole	869	56.9	–4.8
Labor	Di Shanahan	658	43.1	+25.2
Total formal votes		1,527	95.7	N/A
Informal votes		69	4.3	N/A
Turnout		1,596	66.0	N/A
Country Liberal hold		Swing	N/A	

1983 Northern Territory general election: Araluen
Party	Candidate	Votes	%	±%
Country Liberal	Jim Robertson	1,268	61.7	N/A
Independent	Goff Letts	420	20.4	N/A
Labor	Allen Joy	368	17.9	N/A
Total formal votes		2,056	98.6	N/A
Informal votes		30	1.4	N/A
Turnout		2,086	89.1	N/A
Two-candidate-preferred result
Country Liberal	Jim Robertson	1,479	66.2	N/A
Independent	Goff Letts	755	33.8	N/A
Country Liberal win		(new seat)		

- Two candidate preferred vote is estimated.
