= 2020 Johnston by-election =

Northern Territory by-election

- 29 February 2020

The division of Johnston in the Northern Territory Legislative Assembly
- Turnout: 68.5% ▼11.9
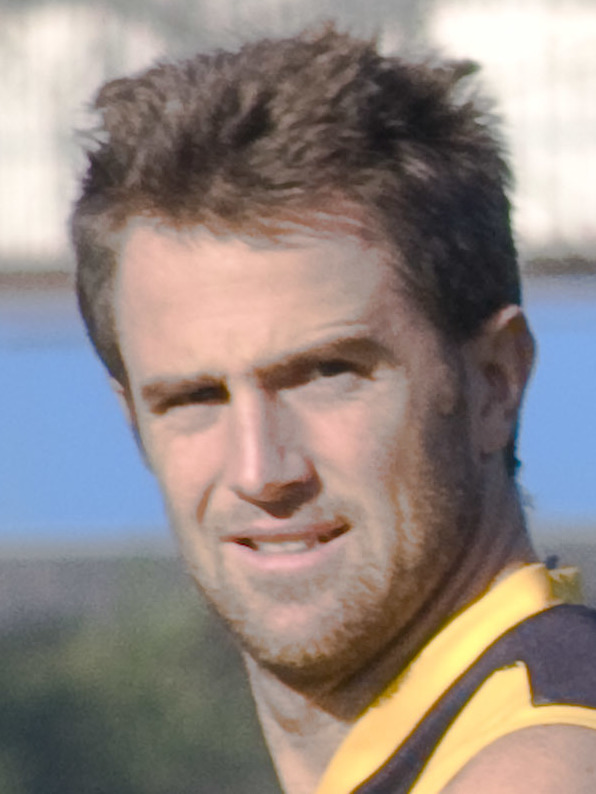

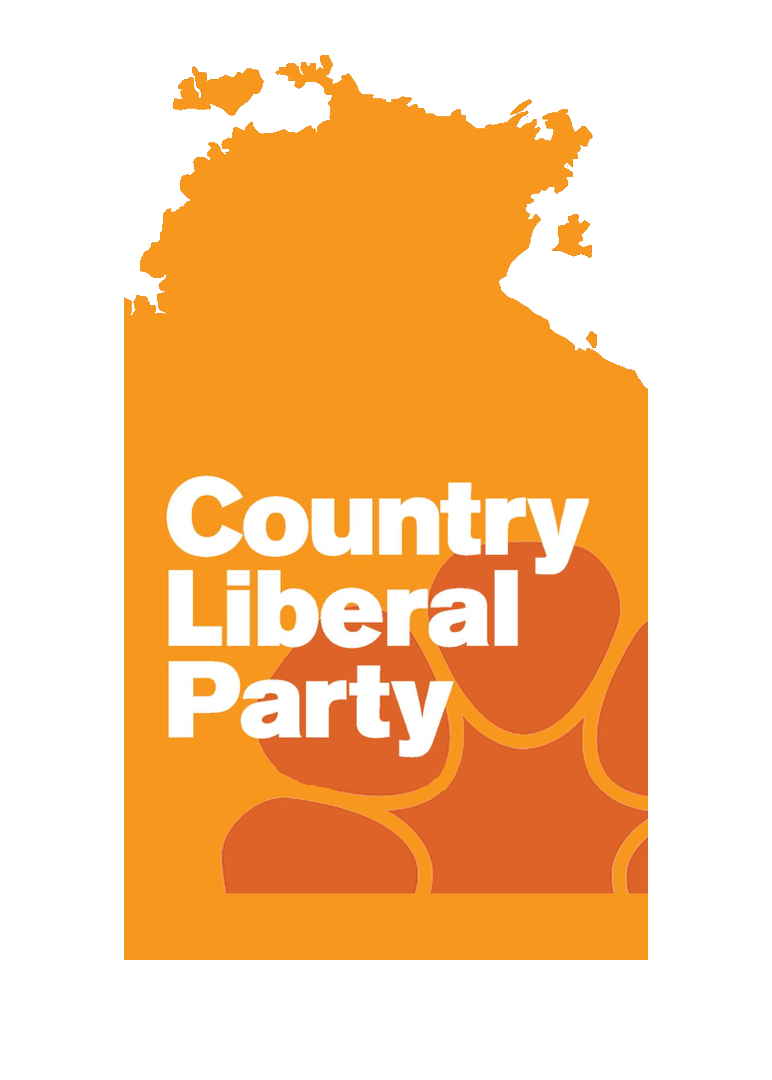
	First party	Second party	Third party
		TA
Candidate	Joel Bowden	Steven Klose	Aiya Goodrich Carttling
Party	Labor	Territory Alliance	Greens
Popular vote	983	728	565
Percentage	29.9	22.1	17.2
Swing	▼21.5	▲22.1	Steady
TCP	52.6%	47.4%
TCP swing	▼12.1	▲47.4
	Fourth party	Fifth party
		BAN
Candidate	Josh Thomas	Braedon Earley
Party	Country Liberal	Ban Fracking
Popular vote	536	343
Percentage	16.3	10.4
Swing	▼16.3	▲10.4
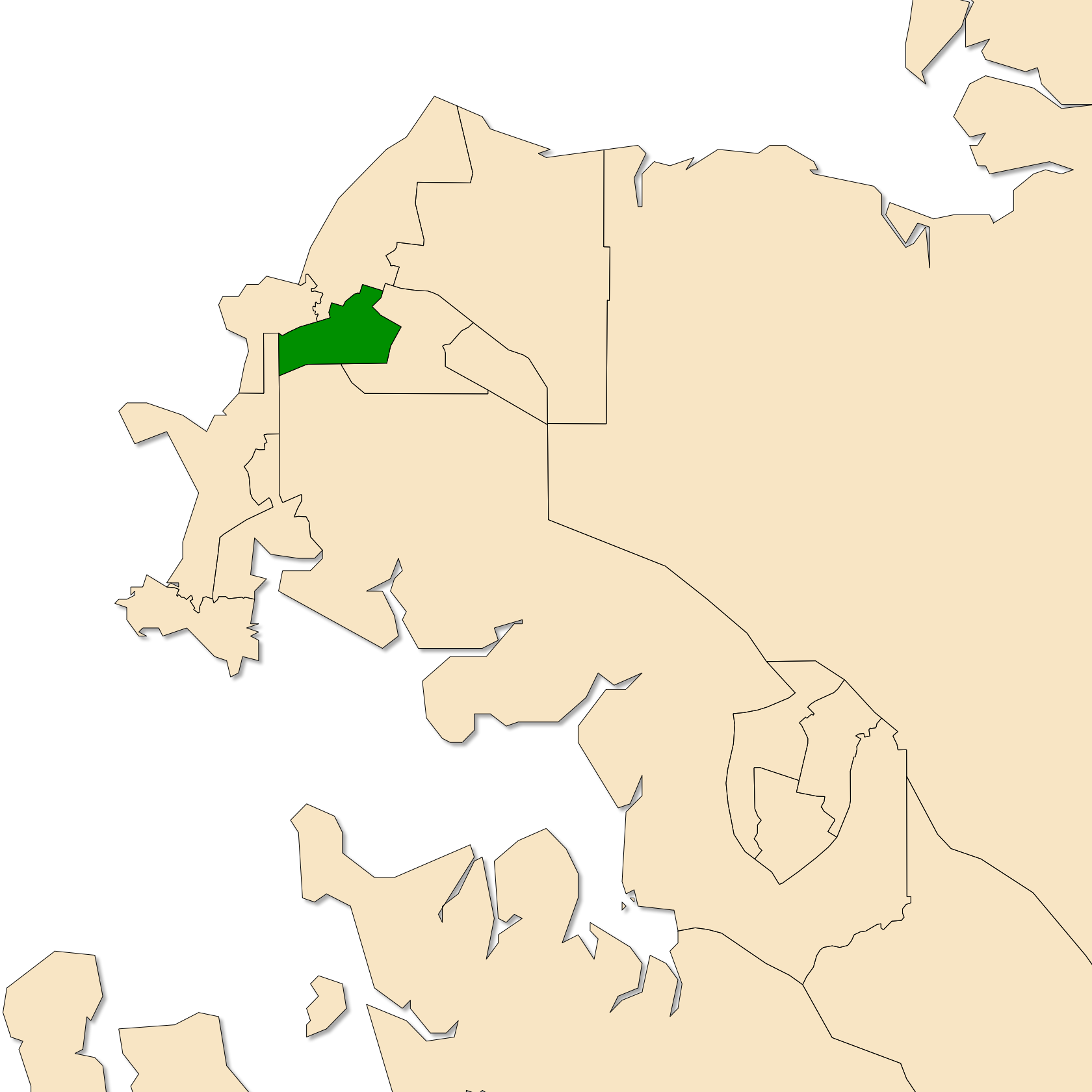
- Map of the electoral division of Johnston in the Darwin/Palmerston area
MLA before election
Ken Vowles
Labor
Elected MLA
Joel Bowden
Labor

A by-election in the seat of Johnston in the Northern Territory was held on 29 February 2020, following the resignation of Ken Vowles, the MLA for Johnston, on 31 January 2020. Vowles was first elected in the 2012 Northern Territory general election, winning 45% of first preference votes and 55.7% of the two-party-preferred vote. At the 2016 Northern Territory general election, Vowles was re-elected with 51% of first preference votes and 64.7% of the two-party-preferred vote.

Former AFL footballer Joel Bowden won the by-election, representing the Labor Party. In a highly unusual move, the Greens preferenced Labor last on their how-to-vote cards (HTVs), even behind the Country Liberal Party (CLP), due to Labor's support for fracking.

== Candidates ==
A total of 7 candidates were declared nominated by the NTEC.

7 candidates in ballot paper order
Party	Candidate	Background
Greens	Aiya Goodrich Carttling	Children's entertainer
Country Liberal	Josh Thomas	Drugs and alcohol outreach worker
Labor	Joel Bowden	Union official and former professional Australian rules footballer
Independent	Trevor Jenkins	
Independent	George Mamouzellos	
Territory Alliance	Steven Klose	Country Liberal candidate for Johnston in 2016
Ban Fracking Fix Crime Protect Water	Braedon Earley	Former Country Liberal president, founder of 1 Territory Party

== Results ==
2020 Johnston by-election
Party	Candidate	Votes	%	±%
Labor	Joel Bowden	983	29.9	−21.5
Territory Alliance	Steven Klose	728	22.1	N/A
Greens	Aiya Goodrich Carttling	565	17.2	±0.0
Country Liberal	Josh Thomas	536	16.3	−15.1
Ban Fracking Fix Crime Protect Water	Braedon Earley	343	10.4	N/A
Independent	Trevor Jenkins	80	2.4	N/A
Independent	George Mamouzellos	57	1.7	N/A
Total formal votes		3,292	96.4	−1.7
Informal votes		123	3.6	+1.7
Turnout		3,415	68.5	−11.9
Two-candidate-preferred result
Labor	Joel Bowden	1,731	52.6	−12.1
Territory Alliance	Steven Klose	1,561	47.4	+47.4
Labor hold				

== See also ==
- List of Northern Territory by-elections
- Electoral results for the division of Johnston
