= 2007 Greatorex by-election =

- 28 July 2007
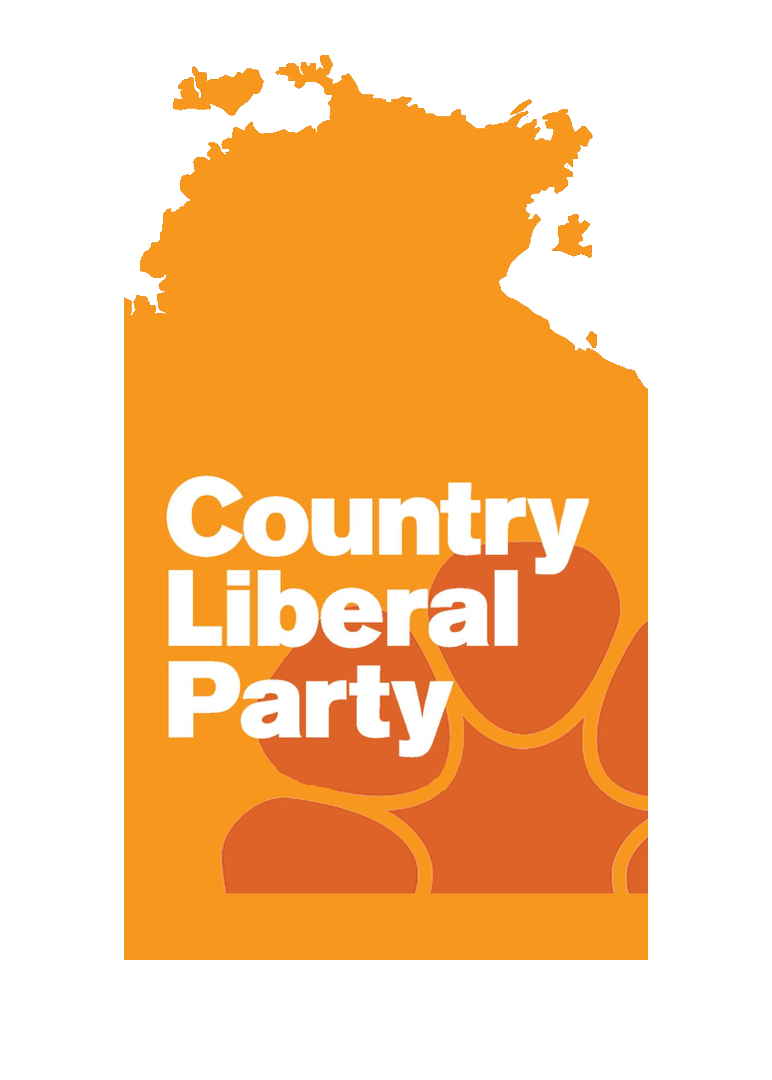

| | First party | Second party | Third party |
|---|---|---|---|
| | | IND |
| Candidate | Matt Conlan | Paul Herrick | Jo Nixon |
| Party | Country Liberal | Independent | Labor |
| Popular vote | 1,764 | 670 | 541 |
| Percentage | 53.6% | 20.4% | 16.4% |
| Swing | ▲5.1 | ▲20.4 | ▼24.4 |
| TCP | 57.8% | 42.3% |
| TCP swing | ▲6.4 | ▲42.3 |
MP before election
Richard Lim
Country Liberal
Elected MP
Matt Conlan
Country Liberal

The 2007 Greatorex by-election was a by-election held on 28 July 2007 for the Northern Territory Legislative Assembly electorate of Greatorex in Alice Springs.

The by-election was triggered when Dr Richard Lim, the Country Liberal Party member for Greatorex, resigned from politics on 9 July 2007. Lim had held the seat since 1994, and had served as Deputy Opposition Leader under former CLP leader Denis Burke. Greatorex is generally considered a safe seat for the CLP, and Lim, a popular local member, had managed to retain the seat at the 2005 election despite both a huge territory-wide loss which saw Burke lose his seat and the presence of a Labor star candidate in high-profile Alice Springs mayor Fran Kilgariff. Lim stated that he was resigning in order to care for his ailing wife and parents, and was considering returning to his medical practice. He apologised for retiring mid-term, an act he had previously criticised former Attorney-General Peter Toyne for doing in 2006.

The by-election saw CLP candidate Matt Conlan elected on primary votes alone, polling 52% of the vote, a small increase on the 2005 election. Independent candidate Paul Herrick finished second with 20%, just ahead of Labor candidate Jo Nixon on 16%. Greens candidate Jane Clark finished fourth with 9% of the vote.

There were 4564 people enrolled within the electorate at the close of the rolls for the by-election on 13 July.

== Candidates ==
The Country Liberal Party preselected local "shock jock" radio presenter Matt Conlan as their candidate unopposed, with the support of party leader Jodeen Carney. A number of potential CLP candidates, including former MLA John Elferink, former candidate Michael Jones, who nearly won the adjacent seat of Braitling in 2005, and Alice Springs deputy mayor David Koch had all previously ruled out nominating.

The Labor Party preselected Jo Nixon, an audiologist and the organiser of the annual Alice Springs Beanie Festival as their candidate. The 2005 candidate, Fran Kilgariff, was reportedly not interested in standing again.

Alice Springs' deputy chief fire officer, Paul Herrick, contested the by-election as an independent. He was strongly endorsed by Loraine Braham, the independent MLA for the adjacent seat of Braitling. His candidacy was widely thought to pose the biggest potential threat to the CLP in the traditionally safe seat, and raised some speculation that the CLP could have lost party status had he won.

Former Alice Springs alderman Jane Clark contested the by-election for the Greens. She had previously expressed interest in the Labor nomination, but had been unsuccessful, and had been expected as a likely independent candidate after resigning from the council on 12 July. However, she made a surprise announcement on the last day of nominations, 16 July, that she would instead run as a candidate of the Greens, who had not previously been expected to contest the by-election.

== Campaign ==
The by-election campaign centred on a number of issues, including housing, law and order and the environment. Independent candidate Herrick promised to push for more affordable housing in town, arguing for unoccupied public housing to be sold off to provide cheap housing options, and calling for the creation of a satellite city for Alice Springs at Owen Springs, similar to Palmerston, near Darwin. The CLP also touched on housing issues, promising to reform the territory's HomeNorth scheme if elected in an effort to ease housing pressures.

The CLP repeatedly focused on law and order issues during the campaign, criticising crime rates and expressing support for the federal government's intervention in the region, including the ban on public consumption of alcohol in the town. Conlan promised to support the construction of a detox facility in the town to further combat the effects of alcohol if elected. Labor also focused its campaign on law and order issues, with Nixon's primary promise being the construction of a remote "boot camp" for young offenders in Central Australia, which subsequently received support from the territory government. Herrick also touched on the issue, criticising the lack of positive activities available for youth in Alice Springs.

Environmental issues were also raised a number of times throughout the campaign, with both the Labor and Green candidates raising concern about the prospect of the federal government building a nuclear waste dump in the region.

The CLP campaign received an early blow when high-profile former party treasurer and Alice Springs party president Andrew Maloney publicly endorsed Labor candidate Jo Nixon, risking expulsion from the CLP. He stated that he thought Labor would be in government in the territory for the next "six to ten years", and that he felt the electorate would be better off with a government member in the circumstances.

The CLP, Labor and the Greens directed their second preferences to Herrick. Herrick chose to direct no preferences.

== Results ==
Greatorex by-election, 2007
| Party | Candidate | Votes | % | ±% |
|---|---|---|---|---|
| Country Liberal | Matt Conlan | 1,764 | 53.6 | +5.1 |
| Independent | Paul Herrick | 670 | 20.4 | +20.4 |
| Labor | Jo Nixon | 541 | 16.4 | −24.4 |
| Greens | Jane Clark | 316 | 9.6 | −1.1 |
| Total formal votes | | 3,261 | 97.8 | +0.3 |
| Informal votes | | 75 | 2.2 | −0.3 |
| Turnout | | 3,366 | 73.8 | −12.5 |
Two-party-preferred result
| Country Liberal | Matt Conlan | 2,150 | 65.3 | +14.0 |
| Labor | Jo Nixon | 1,141 | 34.7 | −14.0 |
Two-candidate-preferred result
| Country Liberal | Matt Conlan | 1,899 | 57.8 | +6.4 |
| Independent | Paul Herrick | 1,392 | 42.3 | +42.3 |
| Country Liberal hold | | Swing | +6.4 | |
