= Scott McConnell (politician) =

Australian politician

Scott McConnell MLA

Member of the Northern Territory Legislative Assembly for Stuart
- In office 27 August 2016 – 22 August 2020
- Preceded by: Bess Price
- Succeeded by: Seat abolished

Personal details
- Born: Scott Lindsley McConnell Alice Springs, Northern Territory, Australia
- Party: Independent (2019–present)
- Other political affiliations: Labor Party (2016–2019)

Scott Lindsley McConnell is an Australian politician. He served as a member of the Northern Territory Legislative Assembly from 2016 until 2020, representing the electorate of Stuart. Elected as a Labor MP, he was one of three MPs excluded from the Labor caucus on 21 December 2018 over criticism of the government; he then resigned from the party on 19 February 2019.

== Early life and career ==
McConnell was born in Alice Springs while his parents were based at Willowra Station in the Northern Territory. He spent his childhood at Napperby Station.

McConnell was a park ranger with the Northern Territory Parks and Wildlife Commission, and then worked in Aboriginal enterprises Ikuntji Community Council in Amata. He then became CEO of the Ingkerreke and Ngurratjuta/Pmara Ntjarra Aboriginal Corporation.

== Politics ==
In 2016, McConnell won the Labor nomination in the remote seat of Stuart, held by Bess Price of the Country Liberal Party. During the campaign, McConnell travelled over 60,000 km while husting in the vast electorate, which stretches from northeastern Alice Springs all the way to the Western Australia border. He was endorsed by Alison Anderson, the retiring independent MP for neighbouring Namatjira and a prominent indigenous activist.

MacDonnell won the seat on a swing of almost 31 percent on 75 percent of the two-party vote, the largest swing of the election—enough to revert Stuart to its traditional status as a comfortably safe Labor seat in one stroke. He actually won 67 percent of the primary vote, more than enough to win without the need for preferences.

On 3 February 2018, McConnell announced he would not contest the next election, saying he had made a "huge error of judgement" in thinking he could influence government policy in remote areas.

He resigned from the Labor Party to sit as an independent on 19 February 2019.

He contested the Alice Springs seat of Braitling in 2020.

Northern Territory Legislative Assembly
Preceded by Bess Price	Member for Stuart; 2016–2020	Division abolished
