= 1996 Stuart by-election =

| 28 September 1996 |

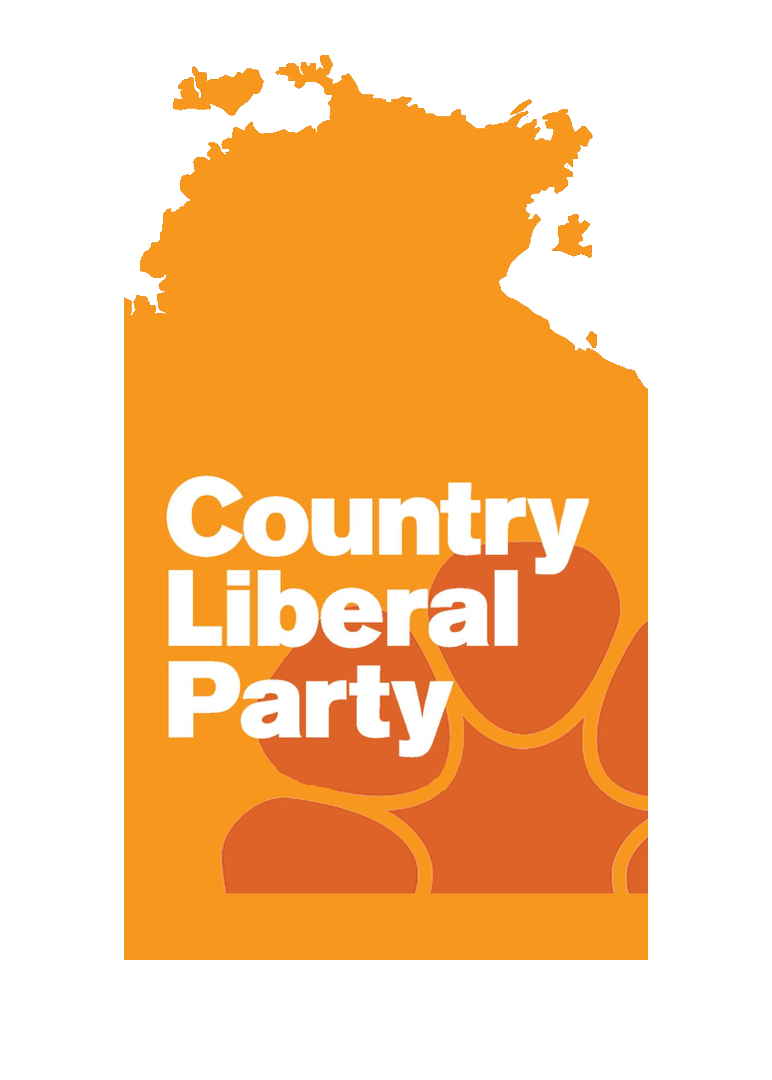
| | First party | Second party |
|---|---|---|
| Candidate | Peter Toyne | Tony Bohning |
| Party | Labor | Country Liberal |
| Popular vote | 1,275 | 1,033 |
| Percentage | 55.2% | 44.8% |
| Swing | ▲3.4pp | ▼3.4pp |
MP before election
Brian Ede
Labor
Elected MP
Peter Toyne
Labor

A by-election for the seat of Stuart in the Northern Territory Legislative Assembly was held on 28 September 1996. The by-election was triggered by the resignation of Labor (ALP) member and Leader of the Opposition Brian Ede. The seat had been held by Ede since 1983.

The ALP selected Peter Toyne as its candidate. The CLP candidate was Tony Bohning, a former Superintendent of Alice Springs Jail.

== Results ==
Stuart by-election, 1996
| Party | Candidate | Votes | % | ±% |
|---|---|---|---|---|
| Labor | Peter Toyne | 1,275 | 55.2 | +3.4 |
| Country Liberal | Tony Bohning | 1,033 | 44.8 | −3.4 |
| Total formal votes | | 2,308 | 95.0 | −0.2 |
| Informal votes | | 122 | 5.0 | +0.2 |
| Turnout | | 2,430 | 63.7 | −3.0 |
| Labor hold | | Swing | +3.4 | |
