= Richard Soon Huat Lim =

Australian politician

Northern Territory Legislative Assembly
Years	Term	Electoral division	Party
1994–1997	7th	Greatorex	Country Liberal
1997–2001	8th	Greatorex	Country Liberal
2001–2005	9th	Greatorex	Country Liberal
2005–2007	10th	Greatorex	Country Liberal

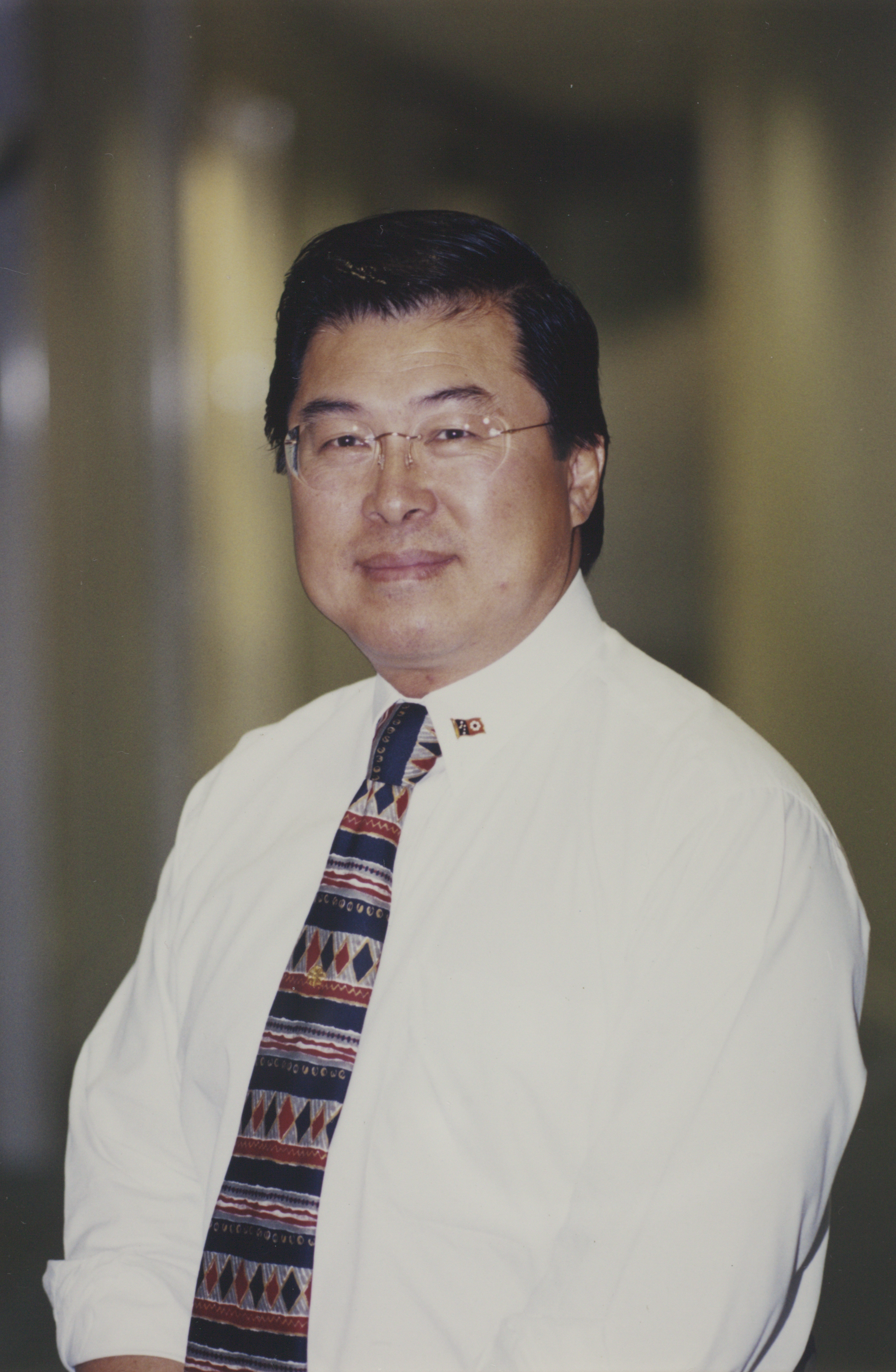
Richard Soon Huat Lim in 2001

Richard Soon Huat Lim (born 23 December 1946) is an Australian former politician. He was the Country Liberal Party member for Greatorex in the Northern Territory Legislative Assembly from 1994 until his resignation in 2007.

Lim was born in Taiping in Malaysia to Chinese parents, but moved to Australia to study at the De La Salle College in Brisbane in 1963. After completing his schooling he attended the University of Queensland where he graduated as a medical doctor in 1972.

After this he worked as a general practitioner in Brisbane and then Adelaide before moving to Alice Springs in 1981 where he joined the CLP and first served as an alderman (1984–1988) and then deputy mayor (1988–1992) of Alice Springs Town Council.

In 1994 he was elected to the Legislative Assembly and served a period as the CLP's deputy leader, but resigned his seat in 2007, prompting a by-election which was won by Matt Conlan.

Northern Territory Legislative Assembly
Preceded by Denis Collins	Member for Greatorex; 1994–2007	Succeeded by Matt Conlan
