= Justine Davis =

Australian politician

Justine Davis MLA

Member of the Northern Territory Legislative Assembly for Johnston
- Incumbent
- Assumed office 24 August 2024
- Preceded by: Joel Bowden

Personal details
- Party: Independent
- Website: justinedavis.com.au

Justine Davis is an Australian independent politician.

In the 2024 Northern Territory general election, she defeated Labor minister Joel Bowden and was elected to the Northern Territory Legislative Assembly for the electoral division of Johnston.

Northern Territory Legislative Assembly
Preceded by Joel Bowden	Member for Johnston; 2024–present	Incumbent
