= 2006 Stuart by-election =

Election in Northern Territory, Australia

23 September 2006

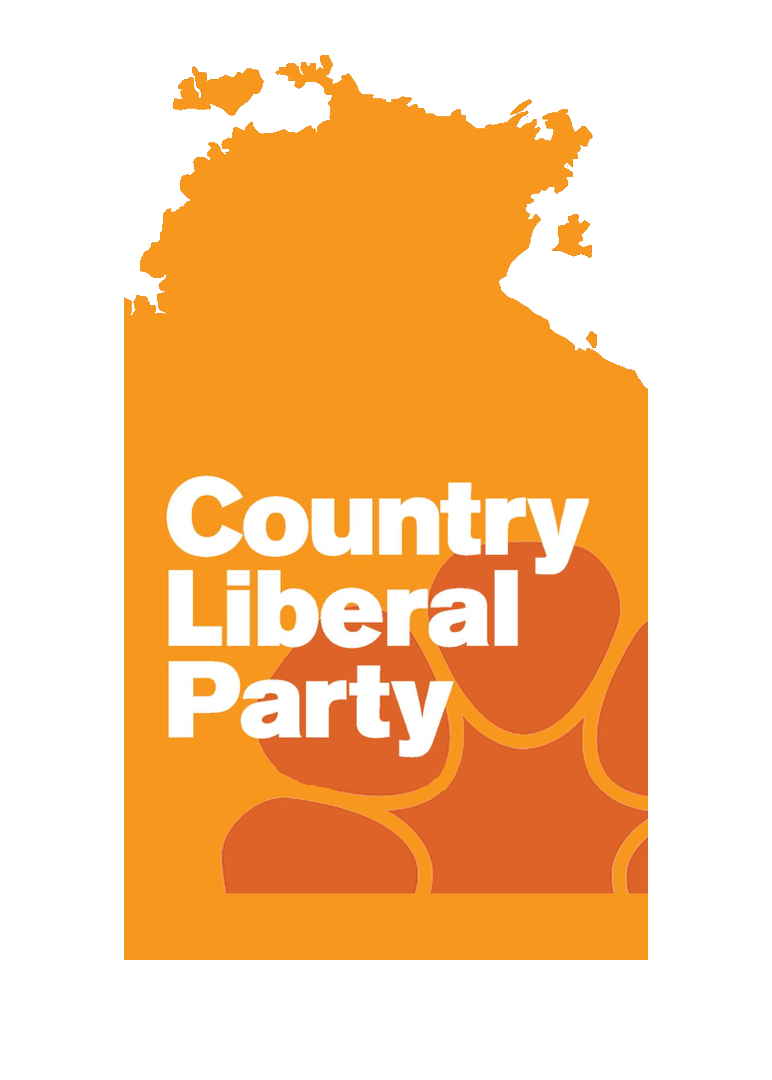
	First party	Second party	Third party
			IND
Candidate	Karl Hampton	Rex Granites Japanangka	Gary Cartwright (politician)
Party	Labor	Country Liberal	Independent
Popular vote	1,180	420 (Note: The CLP endorsed two candidates, Rex Granites Japanangka and Lloyd Spencer Nelson, who finished third and fourth, respectively (although after the distribution of preferences, the former made the two-party-preferred contest). The figures shown are the combined totals of both candidates.)	287
Percentage	57.1%	20.4%	13.9%
Swing	▼14.2pp	▼8.4pp	▲13.9pp
TPP	67.6%	32.4%
TPP swing	▼3.7pp	▲3.7pp
MP before election
Peter Toyne
Labor
Elected MP
Karl Hampton
Labor

A by-election for the seat of Stuart in the Northern Territory Legislative Assembly was held on 23 September 2006. The by-election was triggered by the resignation of Labor member Peter Toyne, the Minister for Health, on 29 August 2006 due to ill health. The seat had been held by the Labor Party since 1983, with Toyne as the member since 1996.

The Labor Party selected indigenous policy adviser Karl Hampton as its candidate. The opposition Country Liberal Party endorsed two candidates, while three independents also contested, including the CLP's 2005 candidate Anna Machado. Hampton easily won the by-election.

== Results ==
Stuart by-election, 2006
Party	Candidate	Votes	%	±%
Labor	Karl Hampton	1,180	57.1	−14.2
Independent	Gary Cartwright	287	13.9	+13.9
Country Liberal	Rex Granites Japanangka	233	11.3	§
Country Liberal	Lloyd Spencer-Nelson	186	9.0	§
Independent	Anna Machado	157	7.6	+7.6
Independent	Peter Wilson	22	1.1	+1.1
Total formal votes		2,065	86.4	−9.0
Informal votes		324	13.6	+9.0
Turnout		2,389	53.9	−5.4
Two-party-preferred result
Labor	Karl Hampton	1,396	67.6	−3.7
Country Liberal	Rex Granites Japanangka	669	32.4	+3.7
Labor hold		Swing	−3.7	

§ The combined CLP vote was 20.3%, a decrease of 8.4% from the 2005 result.
