= Electoral division of Greatorex =

Former electoral division of the Northern Territory, Australia

Coordinates: 23°42′3″S 133°53′59″E

Greatorex Northern Territory—Legislative Assembly
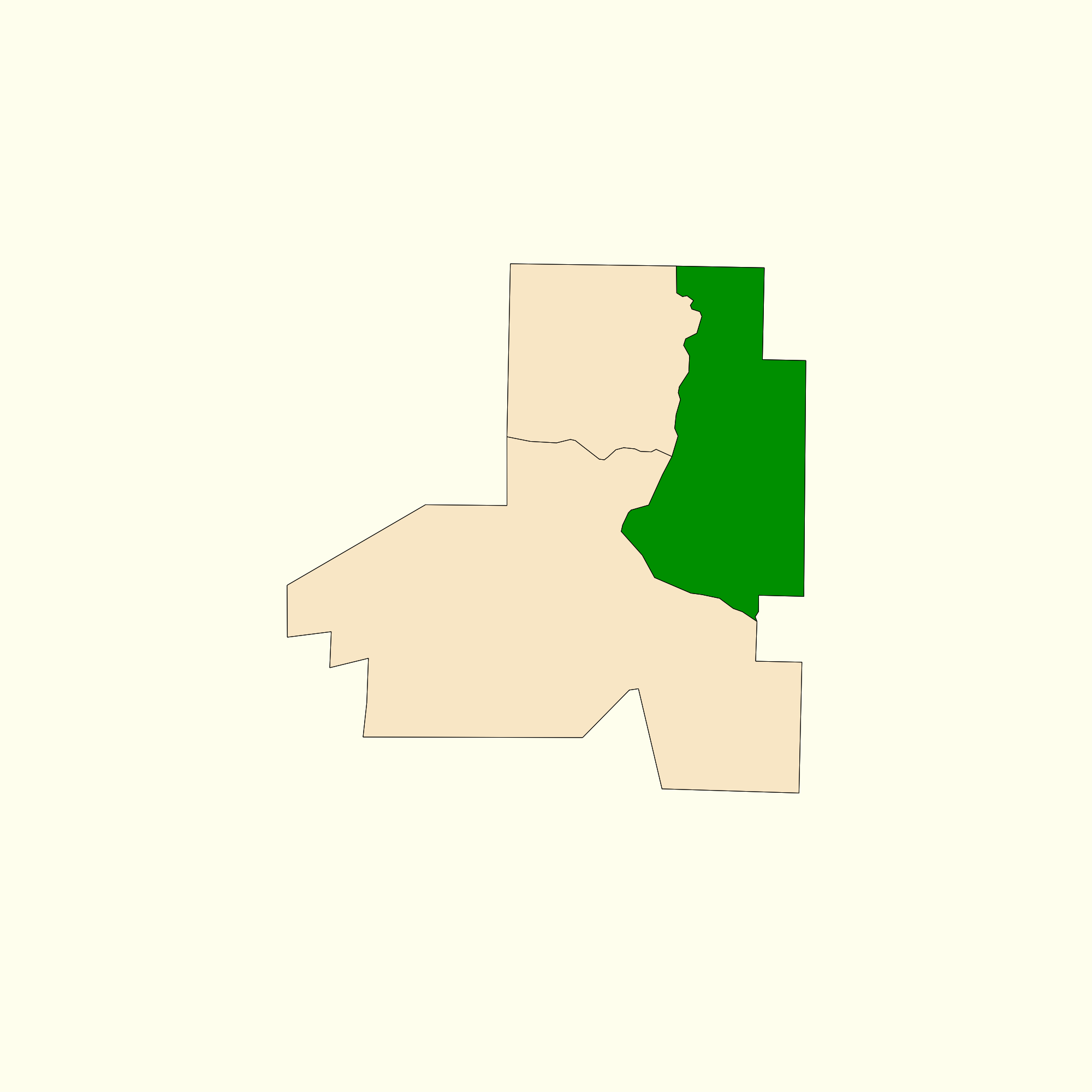
- Location of Greatorex in the Alice Springs area
- Territory: Northern Territory
- Created: 1990
- Abolished: 2016
- Namesake: Tony Greatorex
- Electors: 4,606 (2012)
- Area: 76 km^{2} (29.3 sq mi)
- Demographic: Urban

Greatorex was an electoral division of the Legislative Assembly in Australia's Northern Territory. It was first created in 1990, replacing the abolished electorate of Sadadeen, and was named after Tony Greatorex, the last President of the Legislative Council. Greatorex was a mostly urban electorate, covering an area of 76 km^{2}, and encompassing the Alice Springs suburbs of Sadadeen and Traeger Park. There were 4,606 people enrolled in the electorate as of August 2012.

Alice Springs has always been a conservative area, and has generally been considered Country Liberal Party heartland. However, Greatorex was located in a particularly conservative portion of Alice Springs, and its demographics suggested that it should have been a very safe CLP seat even by Alice Springs standards. Nonetheless, conservative independent Denis Collins won the seat when it was first contested in 1990. Collins had represented most of the electorate as the member for Sadadeen since 1983, and before then had represented Alice Springs from 1980 to 1983, and was a former CLP MLA. He was defeated at the 1994 election by endorsed CLP candidate Dr Richard Lim. Lim was easily re-elected in 1997 and 2001, and was one of only four CLP members to survive the Labor landslide victory at the 2005 election, despite the presence of a Labor star candidate in high-profile Alice Springs mayor Fran Kilgariff. Lim resigned from parliament on 9 July 2007 in the middle of his fourth term. He was replaced by another CLP member, former radio broadcaster Matt Conlan, at the resulting by-election on 28 July.

Greatorex was abolished at the 2016 general election, with its constituents divided between Araluen, Braitling and Namatjira.

== Members for Greatorex ==
Member	Party	Term
Denis Collins	Independent	1990–1994
Richard Lim	Country Liberal Party	1994–2007
Matt Conlan	Country Liberal Party	2007–2016

== Election results ==
2012 Northern Territory general election: Greatorex
Party	Candidate	Votes	%	±%
Country Liberal	Matt Conlan	1,991	56.7	−4.5
Labor	Rowan Foley	673	19.2	−1.2
Independent	Phil Walcott	512	14.6	+14.6
Greens	Evelyne Roullet	338	9.6	−8.8
Total formal votes		3,514	97.3	−0.3
Informal votes		99	2.7	+0.3
Turnout		3,613	78.4	+1.9
Two-party-preferred result
Country Liberal	Matt Conlan	2,278	64.8	−1.7
Labor	Rowan Foley	1,236	35.2	+1.7
Country Liberal hold		Swing	−1.7	
