= Joel Bowden =

Australian rules footballer

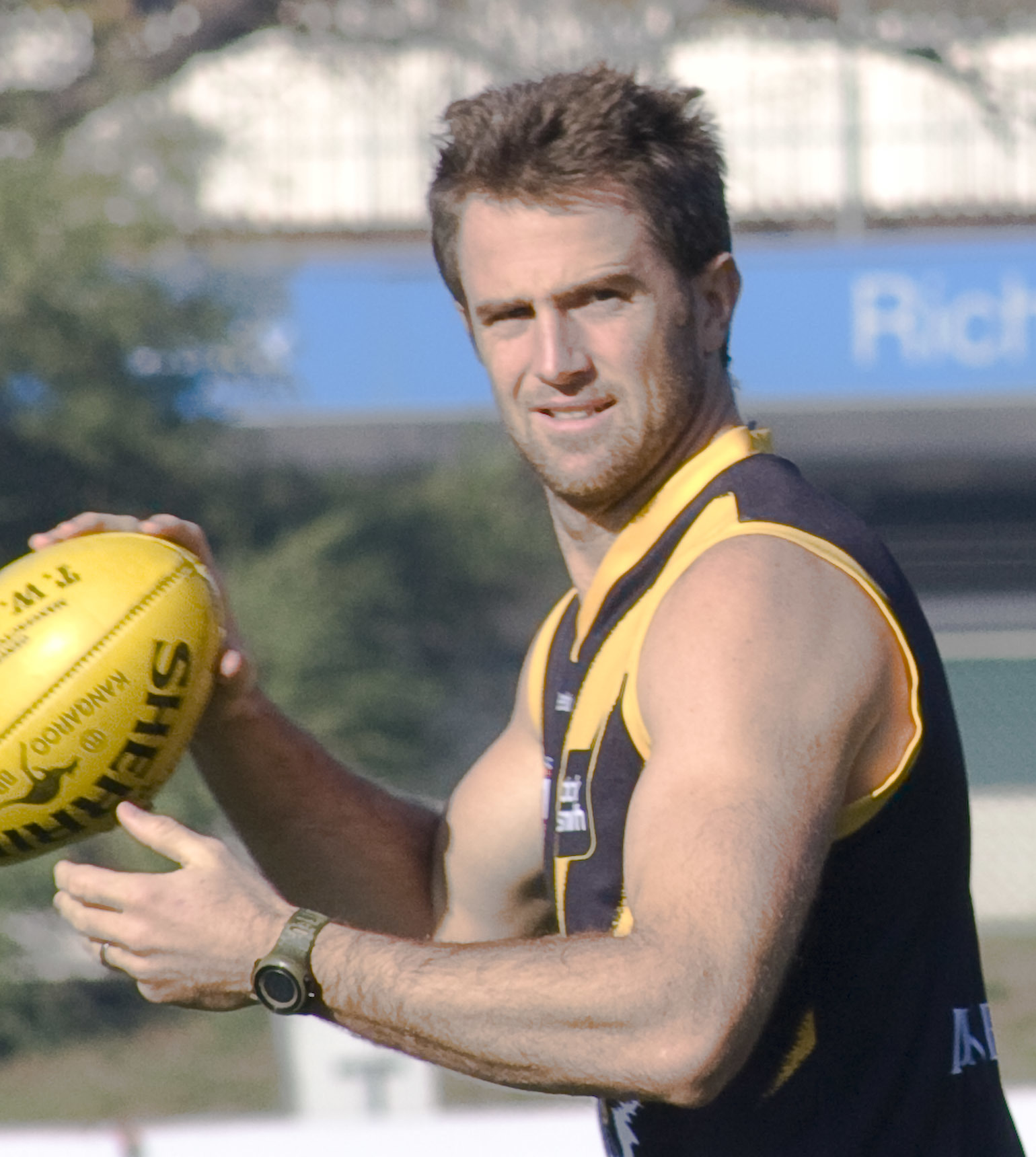
- Bowden in May 2009

Member of the Northern Territory Legislative Assembly for Johnston
- In office 29 February 2020 – 24 August 2024
- Preceded by: Ken Vowles
- Succeeded by: Justine Davis

Personal details
- Born: Joel Francis Bowden; 21 June 1978 (age 48) Mildura, Victoria
- Party: Labor
Australian rules football career
Personal information
- Original team: West Alice Springs (CAFL)
- Draft: Father-son selection, 1995 AFL draft
- Height: 188 cm (6 ft 2 in)
- Weight: 90 kg (198 lb)
- Position: Defender/forward
Playing career^{1}
Years	Club	Games (Goals)
1996–2009	Richmond	265 (171)
- ^{1} Playing statistics correct to the end of 2009.
Career highlights
- 2× Jack Dyer Medal 2004, 2005; 2× All-Australian 2005, 2006; AFL Rising Star nominee: 1997

Joel Francis Bowden (born 21 June 1978) is an Australian politician, former union leader and former professional Australian rules footballer. He was elected to the Northern Territory Legislative Assembly at the 2020 Johnston by-election, representing the Australian Labor Party (ALP) until 2024. He previously played professional football for the Richmond Football Club in the Australian Football League (AFL) from 1996 to 2009.

== Early life ==
Bowden was born at the Hospital to mother Judy and father Michael Bowden (a Richmond Football Club premiership player), one of four biological brothers (including older brother Sean Bowden and younger brother Patrick Bowden) he was part of a football dynasty.

Bowden's family moved to the remote South Australian community of Ernabella, in the 1980s as a very young boy where his father Michael was a community advisor. He spent a couple of years playing with indigenous children in the area. The family returned to Mildura for a few years before returning to Alice Springs in 1987, where Michael became a teacher and where Joel completed his schooling from the age of 9.

Joel played for the Northern Territory Schoolboys in 1993. He was named in the All-Australian Schoolboy's team and won the J.L Williams Medal as best player. In 1994 he once again represented the Northern Territory. In addition to football, Bowden represented the Northern Territory twice in cricket at under 17 level.

== AFL career ==
Bowden was drafted at the end of the 1995 AFL season under a father-son selection.

In 2006, Bowden was among the leading possession getters in the AFL, and had the most possessions shared between any two players with his brother Patrick. He played his 200th AFL game in round 8 against Adelaide, gathering 34 possessions as the Tigers used low risk short-passing tactics to upset the then-ladder-leading Crows by three points just a week after suffering a 118-point loss to the Sydney Swans.

In round 16, 2008, Bowden was at the centre of a major controversy regarding rushed behinds. With Richmond up by 6 points against Essendon with less than a minute left, Bowden proceeded to wipe the remaining time off the clock by rushing 2 behinds from the kick out. These tactics which caused an uproar with many calling for the current rules to be changed; football journalist Mike Sheahan even likened it to the infamous Trevor Chappell underarm delivery incident. He played his last game against Collingwood in Round 20, 2009, who defeated Richmond by 93 points.

=== Statistics ===
Legend
G	Goals	K	Kicks	D	Disposals	T	Tackles
B	Behinds	H	Handballs	M	Marks

Season	Team	No.	Games	Totals							Averages (per game)						
Season	Team	No.	Games	G	B	K	H	D	M	T	G	B	K	H	D	M	T
1996	Richmond	11	5	4	3	17	14	31	7	3	0.8	0.6	3.4	2.8	6.2	1.4	0.6
1997	Richmond	11	13	21	9	146	75	221	51	21	1.6	0.7	11.2	5.8	17.0	3.9	1.6
1998	Richmond	11	18	17	19	178	131	309	72	36	0.9	1.1	9.9	7.3	17.2	4.0	2.0
1999	Richmond	11	22	15	11	238	183	421	82	38	0.7	0.5	10.8	8.3	19.1	3.7	1.7
2000	Richmond	11	22	19	14	293	203	496	124	51	0.9	0.6	13.3	9.2	22.5	5.6	2.3
2001	Richmond	11	25	26	22	381	210	591	149	51	1.0	0.9	15.2	8.4	23.6	6.0	2.0
2002	Richmond	11	22	18	17	334	171	505	125	63	0.8	0.8	15.2	7.8	23.0	5.7	2.9
2003	Richmond	11	22	12	9	300	181	481	128	74	0.5	0.4	13.6	8.2	21.9	5.8	3.4
2004	Richmond	11	21	9	6	345	177	522	128	51	0.4	0.3	16.4	8.4	24.9	6.1	2.4
2005	Richmond	11	22	7	5	324	188	512	131	38	0.3	0.2	14.7	8.5	23.3	6.0	1.7
2006	Richmond	11	21	3	0	326	169	495	133	37	0.1	0.0	15.5	8.0	23.6	6.3	1.8
2007	Richmond	11	22	3	2	329	220	549	179	38	0.1	0.1	15.0	10.0	25.0	8.1	1.7
2008	Richmond	11	18	17	6	259	153	412	153	39	0.9	0.3	14.4	8.5	22.9	8.5	2.2
2009	Richmond	11	12	3	1	195	101	296	84	20	0.3	0.1	16.3	8.4	24.7	7.0	1.7
Career			265	174	124	3665	2176	5841	1546	560	0.7	0.5	13.8	8.2	22.0	5.8	2.1

=== Achievements and honours ===
- Richmond Best and Fairest 2004, 2005
- All-Australian 2005, 2006
- International Rules 2004
- 100 Tiger Treasures "Goal of the Century" Nominee (2008)

== Unions NT ==
In 2018, Bowden was appointed general secretary of Unions NT, the peak body for the labour movement in the Northern Territory.

== Politics ==
Northern Territory Legislative Assembly
Years	Term	Electoral division	Party
2020–2020	13th	Johnston	Labor
2020–2024	14th	Johnston	Labor

In February 2020, Bowden ran for and won the 2020 Johnston by-election to the Northern Territory Legislative Assembly.

In the 2024 Northern Territory general election, he was unseated by independent candidate Justine Davis.

Northern Territory Legislative Assembly
Preceded by Ken Vowles	Member for Johnston; 2020–2024	Succeeded by Justine Davis
