= Matt Conlan =

Australian politician

Matthew Conlan

Member of the Northern Territory Legislative Assembly for Greatorex
- In office 28 July 2007 – August 2016
- Preceded by: Richard Lim
- Succeeded by: Division abolished

Personal details
- Born: Matthew Escott Conlan Queensland, Australia
- Party: Country Liberal Party

Northern Territory Legislative Assembly
Years	Term	Electoral division	Party
2007–2008	10th	Greatorex	Country Liberal
2008–2012	11th	Greatorex	Country Liberal
2012–2016	12th	Greatorex	Country Liberal

Matthew Escott Conlan (born 1968) is an Australian former politician.

He was a Country Liberal Party member of the Northern Territory Legislative Assembly from 2007 to 2016, having won his seat of Greatorex in a 2007 by-election. He held several ministerial portfolios in the Mills and Giles Ministries, including Minister for Tourism, Minister for Sport, Minister for Arts and Minister for Housing. He was also the Minister for Transport and Minister for Infrastructure from December 2014. On 10 February 2015, Conlan resigned from all his cabinet positions, citing family reasons.

== Controversies ==
In 2014, Conlan was accused by Robyn Lambley of telling Alison Anderson to "fuck off, you cunt".

Northern Territory Legislative Assembly
Preceded by Richard Lim	Member for Greatorex; 2007–2016	Abolished
