= Australia's First Nations Political Party =

- Leader: Ken Lechleitner
- Founded: 2010
- Registered: 6 January 2011
- Dissolved: 15 August 2015
- Preceded by: Ecological, Social Justice, Aboriginal Party
- Headquarters: Alice Springs, Northern Territory, Australia
- Ideology: Indigenous rights and constitutional reform

Website
- http://firstnationsaustralia.weebly.com

Australia's First Nations Political Party (AFNPP), also known as The First Nations Political Party, was an Australian political party founded in 2010 and federally registered with the Australian Electoral Commission from 6 January 2011 until 15 August 2015 when it failed to demonstrate evidence of the required 500 party members. The party was also formerly registered at a territory level.

The party was founded by former independent candidate Maurie Japarta Ryan, grandson of Aboriginal Australian activist Vincent Lingiari. The policies of the party focused on issues such as Northern Territory statehood and Aboriginal sovereignty.

In 2010, the party supported a number of independent candidates as they were not registered in time for the federal election. The unregistered Ecological, Social Justice, Aboriginal Party also backed several independents, and the parties amalgamated in July 2010 in order to be registered.

The party ran candidates, including Warren H Williams, in 8 of the 25 unicameral Northern Territory Parliament seats at the 2012 territory election, winning 2.2 percent of the territory-wide vote. They performed best in the seat of Stuart, with 16.4 percent of the vote.

The party ran two Northern Territory Senate candidates including Rosalie Kunoth-Monks at the 2013 federal election winning 1.4 percent of the Northern Territory Senate vote.

The party changed their name in November 2013 from "Australian First Nations Political Party" to "Australia's First Nations Political Party".
