= Willowra Station =

Pastoral lease in the Northern Territory of Australia

Coordinates: 21°14′43″S 132°36′46″E

Willowra Station was a 4,885-square-kilometre (1,886 sq mi) pastoral property in the Northern Territory of Australia located about 350 kilometres (220 mi) north west of Alice Springs. This station straddles the Lander River and is adjacent to the Tanami Desert. In 1979, Willowra was subjected to land claim and after this process the land became Aboriginal Freehold.

== History ==
This station was formerly established on Anmatyerre tribal lands by James Wickham in 1940 when he obtained leases over several areas he previously held under grazing licences. Wickham ran Willowra in partnership with Robert Edward Davis and by 1946 they were running 2000 head of cattle. Davis was charged for the murder of two Aboriginal men in December 1943, one of whom was named Chuckara. Davis was acquitted in July 1945.

In 1946, Willowra was sold to Jack Parkinson for £12,000. He began to develop the station in earnest and by 1953 it boasted six wells, one bore, and five yards. The initial homestead was a Sidney Williams hut but this was soon to be replaced with a new building made of concrete bricks on site.

Parkinson was charged for stealing calves from Anningie Station in 1951. He was found not guilty. Parkinson was then charged for shooting an Aboriginal man Johny Granite, "with intent to do grevious bodily harm". Parkinson allegedly shot at Granite after ongoing incidents of theft and violence towards his former partner, a woman named Mavis. The case was dismissed as evidence given by Granite was "almost impossible to follow".

Parkinson died in 1958 and his son Edgar took over running Willowra, along with adjoining Mt Barkly. Despite drought he continued to develop the station and by 1962 his herd, improvements, and maintenance was described as excellent.

In 1972, Willowra received national publicity when it was one of several stations proposed to be acquired on behalf of the Indigenous traditional owners, of whom 150 lived on the property. The proposal, initiated in the last days of the McMahon government, was implemented in 1973. In 1979, Willowra was subjected to land claim and after this process the land became Aboriginal Freehold.

== See also ==
- List of ranches and stations
