= Electoral division of Stuart =

Former electoral division of the Northern Territory, Australia

Coordinates: 18°20′09″S 130°38′18″E

Stuart Northern Territory—Legislative Assembly
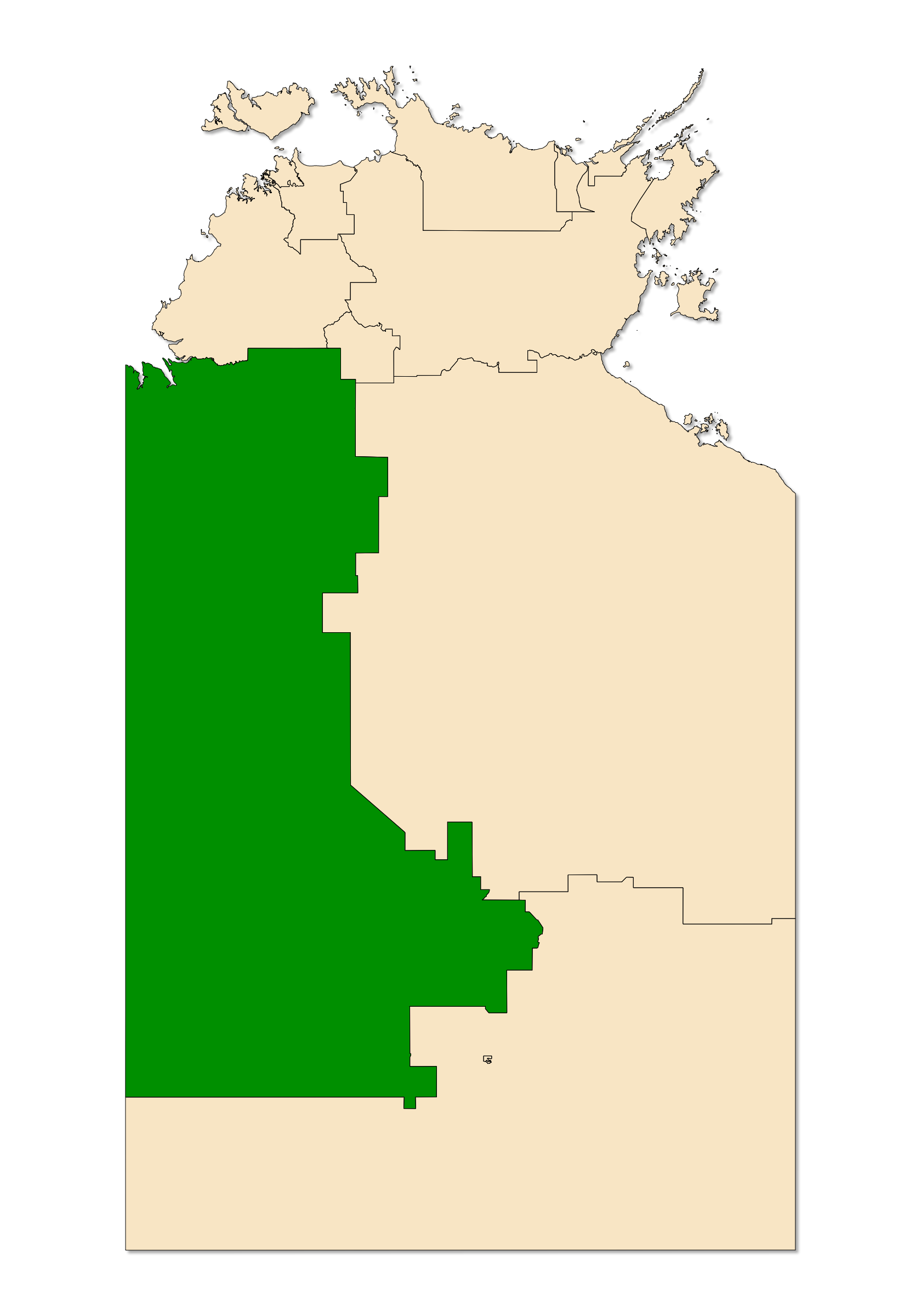
- Stuart in the Northern Territory
- Territory: Northern Territory
- Created: 1974
- Abolished: 2020
- Namesake: John McDouall Stuart
- Electors: 5,242 (2016)
- Area: 383,859 km^{2} (148,208.8 sq mi)
- Demographic: Remote

Stuart was an electoral division of the Legislative Assembly in Australia's Northern Territory.

== History ==
Named after Scottish explorer John McDouall Stuart, it was initially created in 1947 as one of the five inaugural electoral divisions of the Northern Territory Legislative Council. It was an almost entirely rural electorate encompassing much of the western Territory, covering 383,859 km^{2} and taking in the towns of Dagaragu, Lajamanu, Willowra, Yuendumu, and part of the north-eastern side of Alice Springs. There were 5,242 people enrolled in the electorate as of August 2016.

It was originally easily held by the Country Liberal Party, but became much friendlier to Labor when a 1983 redistribution removed most of the Alice Springs area of the electorate. As a result of the redistribution, sitting CLP member Roger Vale, who had held it since its creation, followed most of his Alice Springs constituents into the then-new seat of Braitling. Labor held it without interruption for the next 30 years, usually without serious difficulty. It was held by one-time Opposition Leader Brian Ede from 1983 to 1996, and former Attorney-General Peter Toyne from 1996 to 2006. Toyne was succeeded in a 2006 by-election by indigenous policy advisor Karl Hampton.

Hampton easily retained the seat in 2008, but in the 2012 election, he was opposed by CLP star candidate and indigenous activist Bess Price, who is also Hampton's aunt. Hampton's primary vote more than halved, and Price defeated him on a two-party swing of 18.6 percent amid the ALP's meltdown in the remote portions of the Territory. Price was herself swept out in the 2016 election by Labor challenger Scott McConnell on a swing of almost 31 percent—virtually unheard of in Australian politics—amid the CLP's meltdown that year. McConnell sat on a majority of 25.4 percent, making Stuart the second-safest seat in the Territory. In December 2018, McConnell was one of three MLAs who was banished from the Labor caucus after criticising leader Michael Gunner. In February 2019, McConnell resigned from the Labor Party and served the remainder of his term as an independent.

For the 2020 Territory election, Stuart was abolished and replaced by the new division of Gwoja, which extends south across what was formerly part of Namatjira to the South Australian border.

== Members for Stuart ==
Member	Party	Term
Roger Vale	Country Liberal	1974–1983
Brian Ede	Labor	1983–1996
Peter Toyne	Labor	1996–2006
Karl Hampton	Labor	2006–2012
Bess Price	Country Liberal	2012–2016
Scott McConnell	Labor	2016–2019
Scott McConnell	Independent Labor	2019–2020

== Election results ==
2016 Northern Territory general election: Stuart
Party	Candidate	Votes	%	±%
Labor	Scott McConnell	1,937	67.4	+32.2
Country Liberal	Bess Price	590	20.5	−26.2
Independent	Maurie Ryan	228	7.9	+7.9
1 Territory	Andi Bracey	119	4.1	+4.1
Total formal votes		2,874	98.9	+4.3
Informal votes		32	1.1	−4.3
Turnout		2,906	55.4	−9.8
Two-party-preferred result
Labor	Scott McConnell	2,114	75.4	+30.9
Country Liberal	Bess Price	690	24.6	−30.9
Labor gain from Country Liberal		Swing	+30.9	
