= Peter Toyne =

Australian politician

Member of the Northern Territory Legislative Assembly for Stuart
- In office 28 September 1996 – 4 September 2006
- Preceded by: Brian Ede
- Succeeded by: Karl Hampton

Personal details
- Born: 25 January 1946 (age 80) Melbourne, Victoria, Australia
- Party: Labor Party
- Education: University of Melbourne
- Profession: Teacher

Peter Howard Toyne (born 25 January 1946) is a former Australian politician. He was a Labor Party member of the Northern Territory Legislative Assembly from 1996 to 2006, representing the rural electorate of Stuart. He served as Attorney-General under Chief Minister Clare Martin, and for some years was occasionally tipped as a potential successor to Martin. He resigned from the ministry and from parliament in August 2006, citing health reasons.

Toyne was born and raised in Victoria. He initially spent time as a professional athlete, twice coming third in the Stawell Gift, winning five Victorian championships over 400 and 800 metres, and breaking world records over 550 metres and 600 yards. However, he later studied science and education at the University of Melbourne with the intent of becoming a teacher. He graduated in 1972, and spent several years teaching at Flemington High School. In 1975, Toyne founded the Kensington Community School, and spent four years working on the project.

Toyne left the Melbourne school in 1980, and not long after, relocated across the country to the Northern Territory. He took a particular interest in community education projects aimed at the indigenous community of the Territory, developing several programs and serving stints as both a teacher and an administrator. Toyne also worked as a consultant to the Perron government from 1990 to 1994.

Toyne began to take an interest in a political career, and when Labor Party Opposition Leader Brian Ede resigned from parliament in mid-1996, Toyne nominated to replace him as the ALP candidate for Stuart at the subsequent by-election. The campaign was a particularly close one, but Toyne was ultimately successful, defeating Country Liberal Party candidate Tony Bohning by only 72 votes.

Northern Territory Legislative Assembly
Years	Term	Electoral division	Party
1996–1997	7th	Stuart	Labor
1997–2001	8th	Stuart	Labor
2001–2005	9th	Stuart	Labor
2005–2006	10th	Stuart	Labor

Having been elected, Toyne began serving as an opposition backbencher, and managed to survive another challenge from Bohning at the 1997 election, which was won by only 70 votes. Two years later, Toyne was appointed as the party whip when Clare Martin's ascendancy to the leadership sparked a cabinet reshuffle. By this point, Toyne was becoming an increasingly prominent figure in Northern Territory politics, and at the 2001 election, was easily re-elected, winning more than 70% of the vote. When that same election saw the ALP win their first victory in the history of the Assembly, new Chief Minister Clare Martin appointed Toyne to the ministry, most notably as Attorney-General. Toyne received a further promotion when unpopular Health Minister Jane Aagaard was dumped in October 2003, and he was called upon as her replacement. Though he had publicly speculated about resigning at the 2005 election, he later announced that he would indeed re-contest the seat after being rebuked by Martin, and was easily re-elected for a third full term.

Barely a year after being re-elected, on 29 August 2006, Toyne suddenly resigned from both the ministry and from parliament, citing an unspecified medical condition. A by-election was held, with Labor candidate Karl Hampton successful.

Northern Territory Legislative Assembly
Preceded by Brian Ede	Member for Stuart; 1996–2006	Succeeded by Karl Hampton
Political offices
Preceded by Denis Burke	Attorney-General of the Northern Territory; 2001–2006	Succeeded by Syd Stirling
