= Bess Price =

Aboriginal Australian politician

Bess Price AM
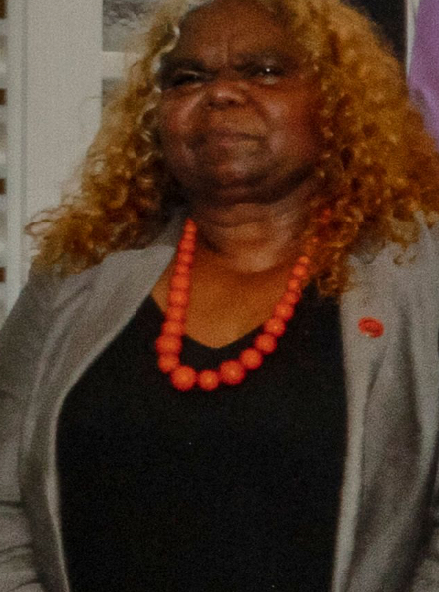
- Price in 2015

Member of the Northern Territory Legislative Assembly for Stuart
- In office 25 August 2012 – 27 August 2016
- Preceded by: Karl Hampton
- Succeeded by: Scott McConnell

Personal details
- Born: 22 October 1960 (age 66) Yuendumu, Northern Territory, Australia
- Party: Country Liberal Party
- Spouse: David Price
- Relations: Karl Hampton (nephew)
- Children: Jacinta Nampijinpa Price (born 1981); Leonard (born 1973–1974, died 1984–1985)
- Education: Curtin University

Bess Nungarrayi Price AM (born 22 October 1960) is an Aboriginal Australian activist and politician. She was a Country Liberal Party member of the Northern Territory Legislative Assembly from 2012 to 2016, representing the electorate of Stuart, and was Minister for Community Services in the Giles Ministry. She lives in Alice Springs in Central Australia, in the Northern Territory.

== Biography ==
Born on 22 October 1960 in Yuendumu, Price's first language is Warlpiri. She also knows Luritja, Western Arrernte and Anmatyerre. Price lived in humpies (traditional Aboriginal dwellings) until she was nine and became a mother at thirteen years of age. A survivor of domestic violence, she left the father of her child when she was 19 and began studying to be a teacher.

She attained a Bachelor of Applied Science in Aboriginal Community Management and Development from Curtin University and has worked in education and training, public administration, the media, community development, interpreting, translating and language teaching and has experience in small business management. With her husband Dave Price, she is a partner with Jajirdi Consultants working in cross cultural awareness training, community liaison and Warlpiri language services.

Northern Territory Legislative Assembly
| Years | Term | Electoral division | Party |
|---|---|---|---|
| 2012–2016 | 12th | Stuart | Country Liberal |

The Northern Territory Labor government appointed Price as chairperson of its Indigenous Affairs Advisory Council. The council was set up to provide advice and make recommendations regarding the implementation and further development of the Closing the Gap and Working Future agendas and to assist the Northern Territory Government to engage with Indigenous people. In November 2011, Price announced her retirement from the Indigenous Affairs Advisory Council and intention to stand for the Country Liberal Party in the Northern Territory election of 25 August 2012 for the Central Australian seat of Stuart against her nephew, Labor MP Karl Hampton. She was elected with a swing of 18%.

She was nominated in 2012 for the US International Women of Courage Award.

On 9 September 2013, she was named Minister for Community Services, Parks and Wildlife, Statehood and Women's Policy in the Northern Territory government. On 12 December 2014, she was appointed additionally Minister for Local Government, and on 10 Feb 2015 also Minister for Housing. She lost office at the Northern Territory election of 27 August 2016.

Her paintings were exhibited in Sydney in 2017.

Since 2022 she has been Assistant Principal at Yipirinya Independent Aboriginal School, Alice Springs.

Price's daughter, former Alice Springs deputy mayor Jacinta Nampijinpa Price, became a senator for the Northern Territory at the 2022 federal election.

== Political advocacy ==
Price has strongly criticised the high levels of violence in Central Australian Indigenous communities, and supported the Northern Territory Intervention instigated by the Howard government. In December 2009 she delivered the Bennelong Society's inaugural Peter Howson lecture, also on the topic of Indigenous violence, and received the Bennelong Medal. She spoke at the Centre for Independent Studies, Sydney, on 23 March 2011 and appeared on ABC television show Q&A on 11 April 2011. On Q&A, Price said that she supported the Intervention.

I am for the intervention because I've seen progress. I've seen women who now have voices. They can speak for themselves and they are standing up for their rights. Children are being fed and young people more or less know how to manage their lives. That's what's happened since the intervention.

In 2012, Price told SBS TV's Insight Program, that mixed heritage Aboriginal Australians should acknowledge their other heritage "And just not go one way... That has to happen here in Australia so we can all be honest and equal with each other and understanding because it creates the division".

In May 2012 and again in August 2012 she criticised Amnesty International for its opposition to the Intervention. Price accused the organisation of ignoring the suffering of women in Central Australia:

When Aboriginal women in Central Australia ask for help, when they are killed, raped and beaten, when they cry for their abused children, you ignore them and you support those who are oppressing them. When the government tries to do something for them you call them racist and you blather on about the UN.

She spoke in Sydney on 29 January 2013, at the launch of Stephanie Jarrett's book, Liberating Aboriginal People from Violence. She again called for an end to violence after the stabbing death of her sister Rosalie in April 2014.

=== Indigenous languages ===
Price is a proponent of allowing the usage of Indigenous languages in the Northern Territory Parliament. She once interjected in her native language, Warlpiri, before being asked to withdraw her interjection by Speaker Kezia Purick, who later stated that unless given permission, debate in Parliament should be in English. She criticised these claims and stated that standing orders did not prohibit it, and suggested that interpreters be available in Parliament.

Northern Territory Legislative Assembly
| Preceded by Karl Hampton | Member for Stuart; 2012–2016 | Succeeded by Scott McConnell |
