= 2012 Northern Territory general election =

- 25 August 2012

All 25 seats of the Northern Territory Legislative Assembly 13 seats were needed for a majority
- Turnout: 76.9 (▲1.3 pp)
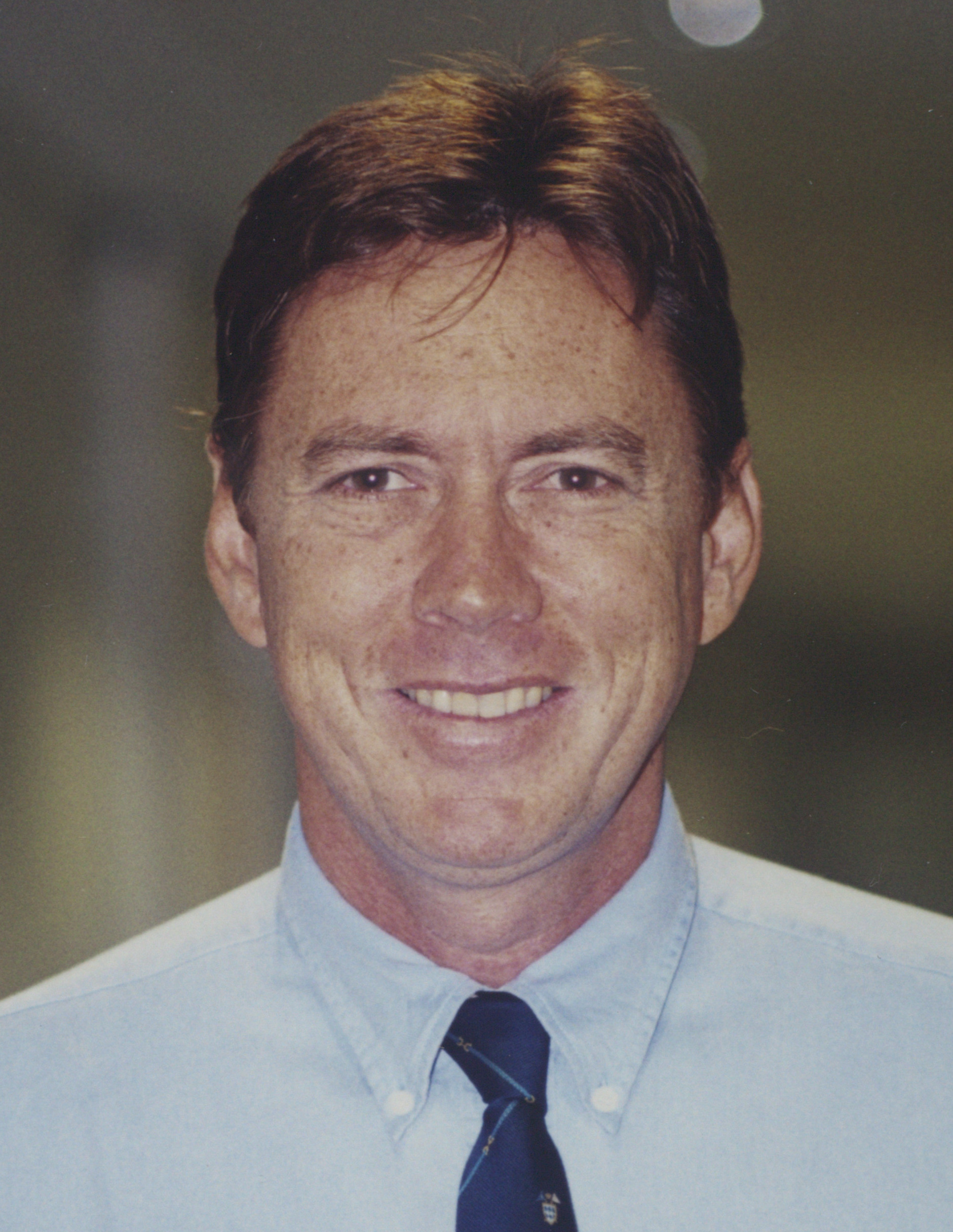

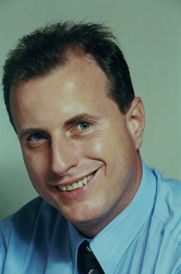
	First party	Second party
Leader	Terry Mills	Paul Henderson
Party	Country Liberal	Labor
Leader since	29 January 2008	26 November 2007
Leader's seat	Blain	Wanguri
Last election	11 seats	13 seats
Seats before	11	12
Seats won	16	8
Seat change	▲5	▼4
Popular vote	46,653	33,594
Percentage	50.6%	36.5%
Swing	▲5.2	▼6.7
TPP	55.8%	44.2%
TPP swing	▲5.1	▼5.1
Chief Minister before election
Paul Henderson
Labor
Elected Chief Minister
Terry Mills
Country Liberal

A general election was held in the Northern Territory on Saturday 25 August 2012, which elected all 25 members of the Legislative Assembly in the unicameral Northern Territory Parliament.

The 11-year Labor Party government led by Chief Minister Paul Henderson was decisively defeated in their attempt to win a fourth term against the opposition Country Liberal Party led by opposition leader Terry Mills with a swing of five seats, losing the normally safe Labor remote seats of Arafura, Arnhem, Daly, Namatjira and Stuart, whilst retaining their urban seats picked up at the 2001 election.

The election was the beginning of an ongoing political realignment in the Northern Territory. Traditionally, remote Indigenous communities had strongly voted Labor. However, at this election, there was a large swing against Labor in Indigenous communities, resulting in the CLP gaining five remote seats usually considered safe Labor seats.

== Results ==
↓
16	1	8
CLP	Ind	ALP

Results of the Northern Territory general election, Legislative Assembly
Party	Votes	%	+/–	Seats	+/–
Country Liberal	46,653	50.63	▲5.23	16	+5
Labor	33,594	36.46	▼6.72	8	–5
Independents	5,566	6.04	▼1.08	1	±0
Greens	3,039	3.30	▼1.00	0	±0
First Nations	2,048	2.22	New	0	±0
Sex Party	717	0.78	New	0	±0
No Affiliation	526	0.57	New	0	±0
Total	92,143	100.00	–	25	–
Valid votes	92,143	96.77			
Invalid/blank votes	3,072	3.23	–0.9		
Total votes	95,215	100.00	–		
Registered voters/turnout	123,805	76.91	+1.3		
Country Liberal	51,435	55.82			
Labor	40,709	44.18			
Total	92,144	100.00			

Independents: Gerry Wood

Two safe Labor seats were uncontested at the previous election and therefore did not contribute to votes and results, all seats were contested at this election with the two previously uncontested Labor seats both won by the CLP.

Popular vote
Country Liberal	50.6%
Labor	36.5%
Greens	3.3%
First Nations	2.2%
Sex Party	0.8%
Independents	6.0%
Other	0.6%

Two-party-preferred vote
Country Liberal	55.8%
Labor	44.2%

Seats
Country Liberal	64.0%
Labor	32.0%
Independents	4.00%

=== Seats changing hands ===
Members in italics did not re-contest their Legislative Assembly seats at this election.

Seat	Pre-2012			Swing	Post-2012		
Seat	Party	Member	Margin	Swing	Margin	Member	Party
Arafura	Labor	Marion Scrymgour	14.0	15.0	1.0	Francis Xavier Kurrupuwu	Country Liberal
Arnhem	Labor	Malarndirri McCarthy	Unopp	N/A	5.3	Larisa Lee	Country Liberal
Daly	Labor	Rob Knight	5.8	10.5	4.7	Gary Higgins	Country Liberal
Namatjira	Labor	Alison Anderson	Unopp	N/A	18.6	Alison Anderson	Country Liberal
Stuart	Labor	Karl Hampton	15.1	18.6	3.5	Bess Price	Country Liberal

== Background ==
Historically, remote areas had voted Labor while the urban areas had voted CLP. The CLP had governed since the initial 1974 election until Labor led by Clare Martin surprisingly came to power with a one-seat majority government at the 2001 election, mainly by sweeping Darwin's more diverse northern suburbs. Labor won in a landslide at the 2005 election, winning the second-largest majority in the Territory's history and reducing the CLP to only four seats. Although Labor led by Henderson retained a one-seat majority government at the 2008 election on 13 Labor, 11 CLP, 1 independent with only 49.3 percent of the two-party preferred vote, Labor had won two seats uncontested by the CLP—all seats were contested again at the 2012 election. Labor, the CLP, the Northern Territory Greens, the First Nations Political Party and the Australian Sex Party were running endorsed candidates.

A minority government was led by Henderson from mid-2009 when Alison Anderson resigned from the Labor Party to sit as an independent member of parliament. Anderson along with the existing independent Gerry Wood signed a letter to the speaker of parliament to push sittings forward, prompting CLP leader Mills to table a motion of no confidence on Monday 10 August 2009. Wood ended up voting with the government, defeating the motion of no confidence. Anderson joined the CLP in September 2011, resulting in 12 Labor, 12 CLP, 1 independent. Wood and Anderson retained their seats at the 2012 election.

In October 2010, former CLP leader Jodeen Carney resigned in her seat, an Araluen by-election was held, the CLP retained the seat but suffered a 6.6-point two-party preferred swing.

== Method ==
Like the Australian House of Representatives, members were elected through full-preference instant-runoff voting in single-member electorates. The election was conducted by the Northern Territory Electoral Commission, an independent body answerable to Parliament.

In a change to polling in remote electorates, where most voting was previously conducted by mobile polling teams, for the first time there was full election day voting in major regional indigenous centres. As such, swings may be distorted. The conducting of a formal polling place could also alter the way voting takes places and increase the local turnout. Mobile polling teams were still used but they took many fewer votes than in the past. In addition, for the first time in the territory, there was an electronic feed of results, the last administration in Australia to go electronic.

== Date ==
The Henderson Labor government introduced fixed four-year terms following the previous election.

The Legislative Assembly was dissolved on 6 August 2012. The electoral roll was closed on 8 August and nominations on 10 August, prior to polling day on 25 August.

The election was held on the same day as the Heffron state by-election in New South Wales.

== Retiring MPs ==
=== Labor ===
- Jane Aagaard (Nightcliff)
- Chris Burns (Johnston)
- Marion Scrymgour (Arafura)

== Candidates ==
Sitting members are listed in bold. Successful candidates are highlighted in the relevant colour.

Electorate	Held by	Labor	CLP	Greens	Other
Arafura	Labor	Dean Rioli	Francis Xavier Kurrupuwu	George Pascoe	Jeannie Gadambua (FNPP)
Araluen	CLP	Adam Findlay	**Robyn Lambley**		Edan Baxter (FNPP)
Arnhem	Labor	**Malarndirri McCarthy**	Larisa Lee		
Barkly	Labor	**Gerry McCarthy**	Rebecca Healy		Valda Shannon (FNPP); Stewart Willey (Ind)
Blain	CLP	Geoff Bahnert	**Terry Mills**		Daniel Fejo (FNPP)
Braitling	CLP	Deborah Rock	**Adam Giles**	Barbara Shaw	Colin Furphy (Ind)
Brennan	CLP	Russell Jeffrey	**Peter Chandler**		
Casuarina	Labor	**Kon Vatskalis**	Jane Johnson		
Daly	Labor	**Rob Knight**	Gary Higgins	David Pollock	Trevor Jenkins (-); Bill Risk (FNPP)
Drysdale	CLP	James Burke	Lia Finocchiaro		**Ross Bohlin** (Ind)
Fannie Bay	Labor	**Michael Gunner**	Tony Clementson	Ken Bird	
Fong Lim	CLP	Ashley Marsh	**Dave Tollner**	Matt Haubrick	Peter Burnheim (ASP)
Goyder	CLP	Damien Smith	**Kezia Purick**		John Kearney (-)
Greatorex	CLP	Rowan Foley	**Matt Conlan**	Evelyne Roullet	Phil Walcott (Ind)
Johnston	Labor	Ken Vowles	Jo Sangster	Alana Parrott-Jolly	Peter Bussa (-); Krystal Metcalf (ASP)
Karama	Labor	**Delia Lawrie**	Rohan Kelly	Frances Elcoate	
Katherine	CLP	Cerise King	**Willem Westra van Holthe**		Teresa Cummings (Ind)
Namatjira	Labor	Des Rogers	**Alison Anderson**		Warren H Williams (FNPP)
Nelson	Independent	Sharon McAlear	Judy Cole		**Gerry Wood** (Ind)
Nhulunbuy	Labor	**Lynne Walker**	Allen Fanning		Kendall Trudgen (Ind)
Nightcliff	Labor	Natasha Fyles	Kim Loveday	Owen Gale	Andrew Arthur (Ind); Stuart Blanch (Ind); Peter Rudge (Ind); Felicity Wardle (ASP)
Port Darwin	CLP	Alan James	**John Elferink**	David Andrews	Rowena Leunig (ASP)
Sanderson	CLP	Jodie Green	**Peter Styles**		Jillian Briggs (ASP); Dimitrious Magriplis (FNPP)
Stuart	Labor	**Karl Hampton**	Bess Price		Maurie Japarta Ryan (FNPP)
Wanguri	Labor	**Paul Henderson**	Rhianna Harker		

=== Unregistered parties and groups ===
- Two previous One Nation candidates ran, One Nation Northern Territory Branch President John Kearney in Goyder and Peter Bussa from NSW in Johnston.

== Electoral pendulum ==
The following pendulum is known as the Mackerras pendulum, invented by psephologist Malcolm Mackerras. The pendulum works by lining up all of the seats held in the Legislative Assembly according to the percentage point margin they are held by on a two-party-preferred basis. This is also known as the swing required for the seat to change hands. Given a uniform swing to the opposition or government parties, the number of seats that change hands can be predicted. Results are notional calculations of the redistribution.

=== Pre-election pendulum ===
Members listed in italics did not re-contest their seat at the election.

Labor seats
Marginal
Fannie Bay	Michael Gunner	ALP	0.9
Daly	Robert Knight	ALP	5.8
Fairly safe
Johnston	Chris Burns	ALP	6.9
Safe
Nightcliff	Jane Aagaard	ALP	10.7
Karama	Delia Lawrie	ALP	10.8
Arafura	Marion Scrymgour	ALP	14.0
Casuarina	Kon Vatskalis	ALP	14.3
Wanguri	Paul Henderson	ALP	14.7
Stuart	Karl Hampton	ALP	15.0
Barkly	Gerry McCarthy	ALP	15.6
Very safe
Nhulunbuy	Lynne Walker	ALP	24.2
Arnhem	Malarndirri McCarthy	ALP	Unopp
Namatjira	Alison Anderson	ALP	Unopp
Independent seats
Nelson	Gerry Wood	IND	28.7 v CLP

Country Liberal seats
Marginal
Brennan	Peter Chandler	CLP	2.7
Port Darwin	John Elferink	CLP	2.9
Fong Lim	Dave Tollner	CLP	4.3
Sanderson	Peter Styles	CLP	5.2
Fairly safe
Goyder	Kezia Purick	CLP	8.4
Katherine	Willem W-v-Holthe	CLP	8.4
Drysdale	Ross Bohlin	CLP	9.3
Safe
Blain	Terry Mills	CLP	10.6
Greatorex	Matt Conlan	CLP	16.5
Very safe
Braitling	Adam Giles	CLP	20.3 v GRN
Araluen	Robyn Lambley	CLP	24.7

=== Post-election pendulum ===
Country Liberal seats
Marginal
Arafura	Francis Maralampuwi Xavier	CLP	1.0
Sanderson	Peter Styles	CLP	3.1
Stuart	Bess Price	CLP	3.5
Daly	Gary Higgins	CLP	4.7
Arnhem	Larisa Lee	CLP	5.3
Fairly safe
Fong Lim	Dave Tollner	CLP	7.3
Port Darwin	John Elferink	CLP	9.6
Safe
Blain	Terry Mills	CLP	13.2
Brennan	Peter Chandler	CLP	14.2
Greatorex	Matt Conlan	CLP	14.8
Drysdale	Lia Finocchiaro	CLP	15.3
Goyder	Kezia Purick	CLP	16.7
Namatjira	Alison Anderson	CLP	18.6
Very safe
Araluen	Robyn Lambley	CLP	22.2
Katherine	Willem Westra Van Holthe	CLP	22.3
Braitling	Adam Giles	CLP	23.6

Labor seats
Marginal
Johnston	Ken Vowles	ALP	5.7
Fairly safe
Karama	Delia Lawrie	ALP	6.4
Fannie Bay	Michael Gunner	ALP	6.8
Wanguri	Paul Henderson	ALP	7.0
Barkly	Gerry McCarthy	ALP	7.6
Nightcliff	Natasha Fyles	ALP	9.2
Casuarina	Kon Vatskalis	ALP	9.3
Safe
Nhulunbuy	Lynne Walker	ALP	19.0
Independent seats
Nelson	Gerry Wood	IND	9.2 v CLP

== Newspaper endorsements ==
Newspaper	Endorsement
The Australian	Country Liberal
NT News	Labor
