= Karl Hampton =

Australian politician

Member of the Northern Territory Legislative Assembly for Stuart
- In office 23 September 2006 – 6 August 2012
- Preceded by: Peter Toyne
- Succeeded by: Bess Price

Personal details
- Born: Karl Rio Hampton; 4 August 1968 (age 57) Alice Springs, Northern Territory, Australia
- Party: Labor

Karl Rio Hampton (born 4 August 1968) is a former Australian politician. He was a Labor Party member of the Northern Territory Legislative Assembly from 2006 until 2012, representing the electorate of Stuart. He served as Minister for Environment, Regional Development, Sport and Recreation, Central Australia and Information, Communications and Technology Policy in the Henderson government.

Northern Territory Legislative Assembly
Years	Term	Electoral division	Party
2006–2008	10th	Stuart	Labor
2008–2012	11th	Stuart	Labor

Hampton was born and raised in Alice Springs. He is of Warlpiri, Afghan, Irish and Scottish descent. He was elected in a 2006 by-election following the resignation of Peter Toyne, and was easily re-elected in 2008. At the 2012 Territory election, Hampton was defeated by his aunt, Country Liberal Party candidate Bess Price.

Northern Territory Legislative Assembly
Preceded by Peter Toyne	Member for Stuart; 2006–2012	Succeeded by Bess Price
