= Ken Vowles =

Australian politician and cricketer

Member of the Northern Territory Legislative Assembly for Johnston
- In office 25 August 2012 – 31 January 2020
- Preceded by: Chris Burns
- Succeeded by: Joel Bowden

Personal details
- Born: Kenneth Edward Vowles; 29 September 1971 (age 54) Darwin, Northern Territory, Australia
- Party: Labor Party
- Occupation: Cricketer

Kenneth Edward Vowles (born 29 September 1971) is an Australian politician and former cricketer from the Northern Territory. He was a member of the Northern Territory Legislative Assembly from 2012 until 2020, representing the electorate of Johnston. He was Minister for Primary Industry and Resources and Minister for Aboriginal Affairs in the Gunner government from 2016 to 2018. He was sacked as a minister and expelled from the Labor caucus in December 2018 when an email he had written to his Cabinet colleagues stating his concern about the state of the Territory's budget deficit was leaked to the media. He subsequently remained in parliament as a Labor backbencher outside caucus, but announced his resignation from parliament in November 2019 with effect from January 2020.

Northern Territory Legislative Assembly
Years	Term	Electoral division	Party
2012–2016	12th	Johnston	Labor
2016–2020	13th	Johnston	Labor

Born in Darwin, Vowles attended the Australian Cricket Academy on a scholarship from 1989 to 1990, during which time he toured internationally with the Australian Under-19 team. As an Under-19 player, Vowles held the record for the fastest century scored at the Melbourne Cricket Ground until the record was broken by Viv Richards.

In 2008, Vowles contested the seat of Blain as a Labor Party candidate at that year's Territory general election, although he was defeated by Terry Mills, the future Chief Minister. He nominated to contest the seat of Johnston in the 2012 election, although a controversy emerged when the Labor Party threatened the Northern Territory News with legal action to prevent the newspaper from publishing a story about Vowles' spent assault conviction from a fight in 1992 (Labor leader Paul Henderson had previously been critical of another candidate for not disclosing a manslaughter conviction).

Vowles was elected as member for Johnston, although the Henderson government was defeated by the Country Liberal Party. After two years as a minister, Vowles was sacked and excluded from the Labor caucus, along with two backbench colleagues who held similar views about the Territory's budget deficit, on 21 December 2018. On 28 November 2019, he announced that he would resign from parliament with effect from 31 January 2020.

Northern Territory Legislative Assembly
Preceded by Chris Burns	Member for Johnston; 2012–2020	Succeeded by Joel Bowden
Political offices
Preceded by Willem Westra van Holthe	Minister for Primary Industry and Resources; 2016–2018	Succeeded by Paul Kirby
