= Star candidate =

High-profile figure recruited by a political party for office

A star candidate (French: candidat vedette) is a high-profile individual who is entering or re-entering elected politics. In Canada and the United Kingdom, the recruitment of a star candidate often includes a guaranteed nomination in a winnable seat.

Star candidates come from several different worlds:

- Notable figures from outside of politics. (Journalists, broadcasters, athletes, celebrities, business executives, etc.)
- Notable figures in public life who do not hold public office. (Leaders of advocacy groups, academics, diplomats, senior military or police officers, union executives, community organizers, etc.)
- Highly visible politicians from other levels of government (such as a mayor of a large city standing to represent said city in national parliament)
- Former politicians who are returning to politics.
- Spouses, children, siblings, or other family of deceased or retired politicians. (Members of a political family)

== See also ==
- Lijstduwer
- Paper candidate
