= 2010 Araluen by-election =

Election in the Northern Territory

- 9 October 2010
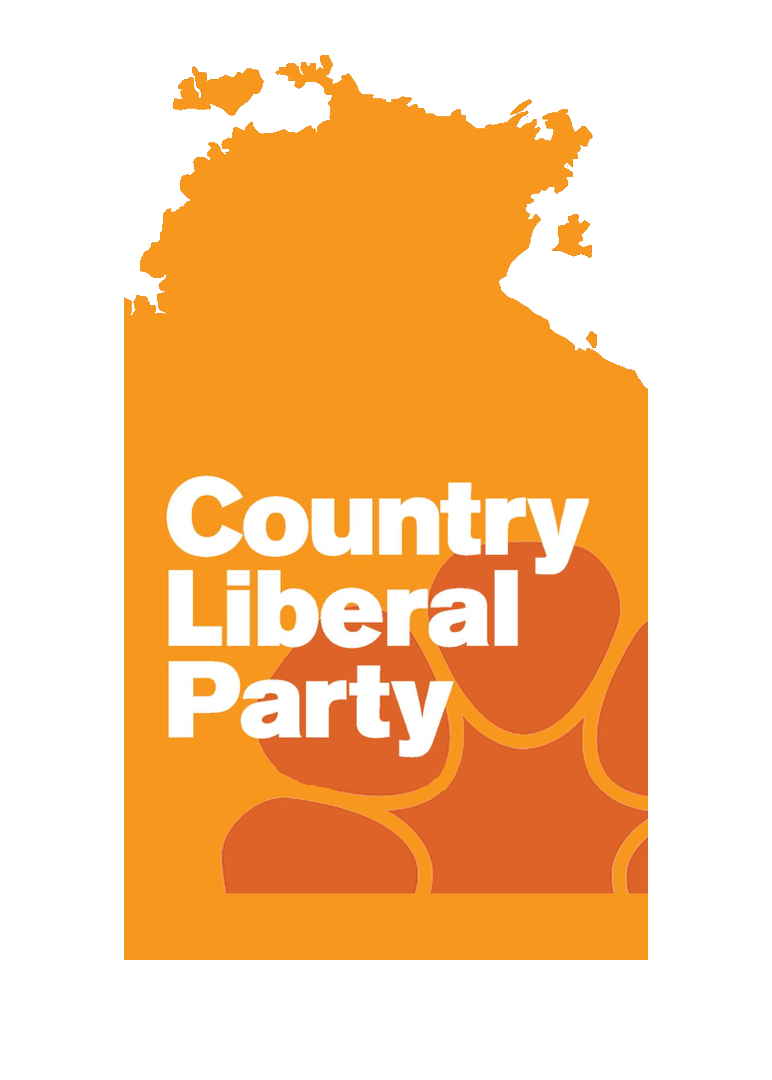

	First party	Second party
Candidate	Robyn Lambley	Adam Findlay
Party	Country Liberal	Labor
Popular vote	1,935	909
Percentage	68.04%	31.96%
Swing	▼6.64pp	▲6.64pp
MP before election
Jodeen Carney
Country Liberal
Elected MP
Robyn Lambley
Country Liberal

A by-election for the seat of Araluen in the Northern Territory Legislative Assembly was held on 9 October 2010. The by-election was triggered by the resignation of Country Liberal Party (CLP) member Jodeen Carney on 3 September 2010 due to ill health. The seat has been held by the CLP since the seat's creation in 1983. Carney narrowly won the seat in the 2001 general election but built up her margin to receive 68 per cent of the primary vote at the 2008 election.

The CLP preselected Robyn Lambley, a former Deputy Mayor of Alice Springs, while Labor preselected Adam Findlay, a chef. Lambley retained the seat for the Country Liberals, receiving around 68 per cent of the vote.

== Results ==
Araluen by-election, 2010
Party	Candidate	Votes	%	±%
Country Liberal	Robyn Lambley	1,935	68.04	−6.64
Labor	Adam Findlay	909	31.96	+6.64
Total formal votes		2,844	95.60	−1.97
Informal votes		131	4.40	+1.97
Turnout		2,975	59.22	−15.43
Country Liberal hold		Swing	−6.64	
