= Electoral division of Johnston =

Coordinates: 12°23′20″S 130°52′45″E

Johnston Northern Territory—Legislative Assembly
- Interactive map of boundaries as of the 2024 election
- Territory: Northern Territory
- Created: 2001
- MP: Justine Davis
- Party: Independent
- Namesake: Eric Johnston
- Electors: 5,782 (2026)
- Area: 5 km^{2} (1.9 sq mi)
- Demographic: Urban
Electorates around Johnston:
Nightcliff	Casuarina	Sanderson
Nightcliff	Johnston	Sanderson
Nightcliff	Sanderson	Sanderson

Johnston is an electoral division of the Legislative Assembly in Australia's Northern Territory. It was first created in 2001, replacing the abolished seat of Jingili, and is named after Commodore Eric Johnston, a former Administrator of the Northern Territory. Johnston is an urban electorate, covering only 5 km^{2} and taking in the Darwin suburbs of Jingili, Moil, Wagaman and part of Alawa. There were 5,782 people enrolled within the electorate as of July 2026.

== History ==
Johnston was essentially a reconfigured version of one of the original electorates in the Northern Territory, Jingili, which had been held by the Country Liberal Party for its entire existence and was the seat of the Territory's second head of government, Paul Everingham. At the 2001 election, however, the CLP member for Jingili, Steve Balch, was defeated by Labor Party challenger Dr Chris Burns. Burns' victory was part of an unexpected Labor wave that swept through northern Darwin, allowing Labor to win government in the Territory for the first time. The area's CLP voting history led many commentators to suggest that it was likely to revert to the CLP at the 2005 election. As it turned out, Burns was re-elected easily amid that year's Labor landslide with a substantially increased majority, though the margin didn't blow out as much as in nearby seats. Burns retired at the 2012 election, and the seat was retained for Labor by former cricketer Ken Vowles with only a small swing against Labor. Vowles consolidated his hold on the seat amid Labor's massive landslide in 2016. In 2018, Vowles was expelled from the Labor cabinet, and resigned on 31 January 2020, with the resulting vacancy filled at a by-election on 29 February 2020.

== Members for Johnston ==
Member	Party	Term
Chris Burns	Labor	2001–2012
Ken Vowles	Labor	2012–2020
Joel Bowden	Labor	2020–2024
Justine Davis	Independent	2024–present

== Election results ==
2024 Northern Territory general election: Johnston
Party	Candidate	Votes	%	±%
Country Liberal	Gary Strachan	1,456	34.6	+14.3
Independent	Justine Davis	1,273	30.3	+30.3
Labor	Joel Bowden	1,108	26.3	−19.6
Greens	Billie Barton	370	8.8	−7.0
Total formal votes		4,207	98.2	+1.2
Informal votes		120	2.8	−1.2
Turnout		4,327	75.3	
Two-party-preferred result (Note: Estimated two-party-preferred count by Antony Green.)
Labor	Joel Bowden	2,224	52.9	−13.1
Country Liberal	Gary Strachan	1,983	47.1	+13.1
Two-candidate-preferred result
Independent	Justine Davis	2,425	57.6	+57.6
Country Liberal	Gary Strachan	1,782	42.4	+8.4
Independent gain from Labor		Swing	+57.6	
