= Alice Springs town camps =

Aboriginal communities in Northern Territory, Australia

Alice Springs town camps, officially called Alice Springs Community Living Areas, are Aboriginal communities within the town of Alice Springs in the Northern Territory of Australia. Their origins vary. Many were originally designed to accommodate people visiting Alice Springs from remote communities but, for many, they have become a permanent and often generational home.

== History ==
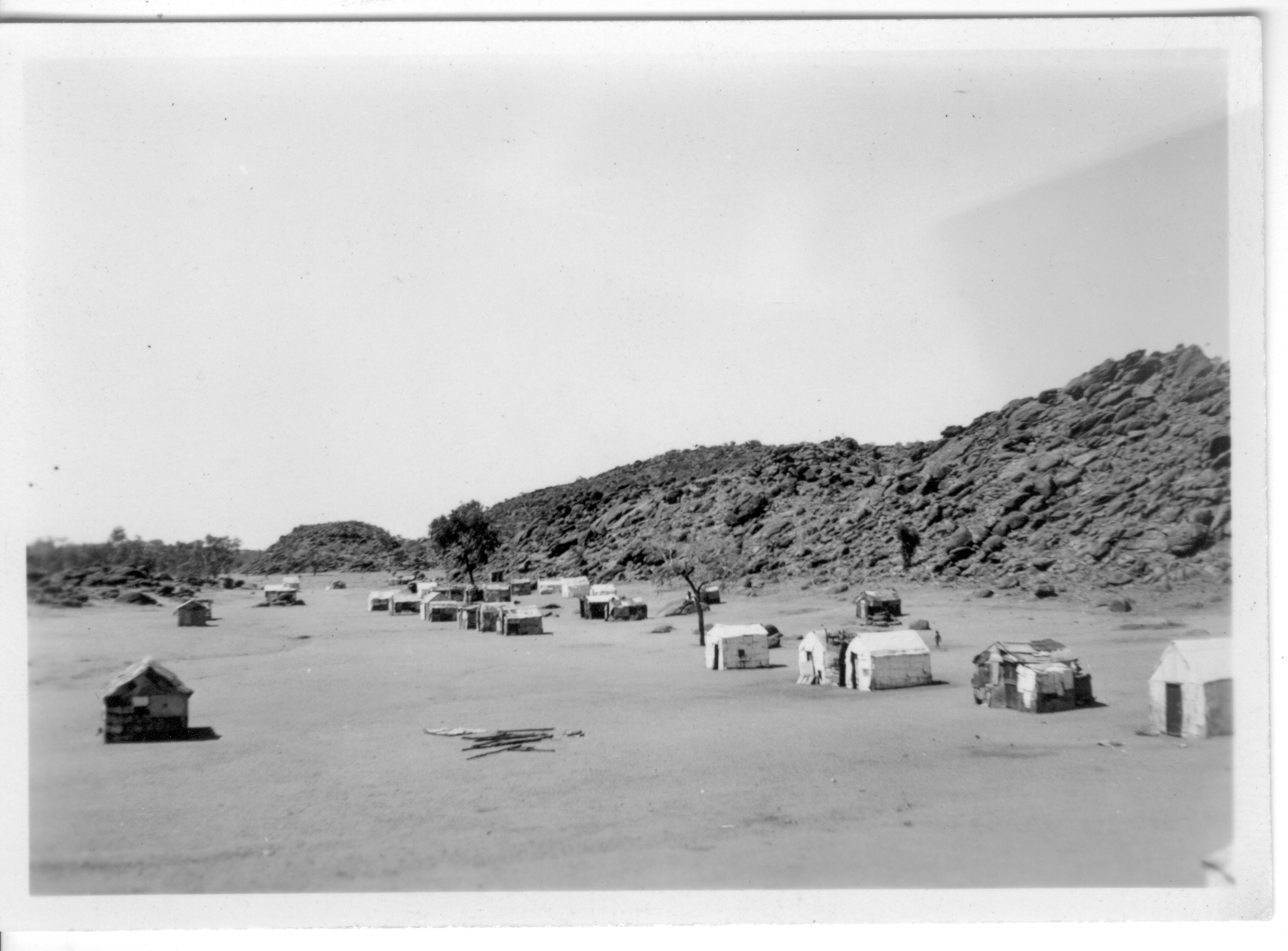
An early camp, possibly on the Charles River, c. 1920s

Alice Springs town camps began as early as the 1880s when Europeans first came to Central Australia following John McDouall Stuart's expedition, which was soon followed by pastoralists and, from 1872, the telegraph line and the establishment of the Alice Springs Telegraph Station. As a direct result of this Aboriginal people were forced from their lands and their camps, then called fringe camps, initially served as convenient ration distribution points and labour camps. Many of the camps were originally designed to accommodate people visiting Alice Springs from remote communities.

By the 1900s opposition to the camps grew and various measures were attempted to remove them, including forced "evacuations" to surrounding missions, like the Little Flower Mission at Arltunga, 1929 and 1960. The township of Alice Springs was declared a prohibited area for Aboriginal people from 1929 to 1960, leading to the establishment of the town camps, which were often located on traditional ceremonial camping areas.

Things changed in the 1970s when town campers began demanding land tender, shelter, and services and, in 1977, when they established the town camp governing body Tangentyere Council. "Tangentyere" is an Arrernte word meaning "all speaking together". For many people, the camps became a permanent, and often generational, home.

== Description and governance ==
As of May 2026, there were 17 town camps governed by Tangentyere Council. Those to the north of Alice Springs are mostly affiliated to remote communities north of the town, while those on the southern outskirts are linked to communities to the south.

In 2019 there were between 1600 and 2000 people living in town camps permanently. The 2021 Australian census recorded a total permanent population of 1,055 people in the camps, living in 256 households. However, the number of residents fluctuates, as family members visit from remote communities, frequently to access health and other services. In addition, the number of people living in the camps can almost double during major events in Alice Springs like the football carnival and the Alice Springs Show. Each camp is a distinct Aboriginal community, based on language and kinship groups.

The town camps are governed by Tangentyere Council, an Aboriginal corporation, while the NT Government provides housing, infrastructure, and various other services.

== List ==
The following aims to be a comprehensive list of town camps:

Town camps
Town camp name	Pronunciation	Alternative name	Meaning	Language	Suburb of Alice Springs	Tenure
Mpwetyerre	UM-BUTCHER-RAH	Abbotts BP Mbutjara Mission Block	Place name	Arrernte, Warlpiri, Luritja, Pitjantjatjara	The Gap	Special purpose lease
Itwiyethwenge		Basso's Farm Bazzo's Farm	Place name	Arrernte, Kaytetye, Anmatyerre, Alywarre	Braitling	Special purpose lease
Anthelk Ewlpaye	UN-DERLK OOL-PIE	Anth Ewlpaye Charles Creek Charles River Kunoth	Gum leaf	Arrernte, Anmatyerre	Braitling	Special purpose lease
Ilperle-Tyathe	ILP-ERL-A-CHATA	Llbili Tjata Motor Registry Warlpiri	Ta Away/Ti Tree	Warlpiri	Braitling	Special purpose lease
Karnte	KAHN-TA		Women's head dress	Luritja, Pitjantatjara	Arumbera	Crown lease
Lhenpe Artnwe	LUN-PA ART-NWE	Armitjira Hoppy's Ntalka Ulpaya	Emu feathers, decoration in arm pit	Anmatyerre, Arrernte, Warlpiri	Stuart	Special purpose lease
Akngwertnarre	UK-NOORT-NARA	Morris Soak	Place Name	Arrernte, Warlpiri	Araluen	Special purpose lease
Anthepe	UN-DUPPA	Drive In Ntapa	Dreamtime dance, women's dancing	Arrernte, Warlipiri, Luritja, Pitjantatjara	Arumbera	Special purpose lease
Aper-Alwerrknge	UPPER AL-OORK-NA	Palmer's Aper Alnerrknge Aper Alwerrnge	Sinewy gum	Arrernte	Stuart	Special purpose lease
Ewyenper Atwatya	OO-YEN-PER-A TWAH-JA	Hidden Valley Ilpea Ilpea	Spearbush gap	Arrernte, Warlpiri	Stuart	Special purpose lease
Ilyiperenye	ILL-PA-RINYA	Ilperentye; Old Timers	Green beetle	Arrernte, Warlpiri, Luritja, Pitjantatjara	Connellan	Special purpose lease
Inarlenge	INN-ARLUNG-AH	Little Sisters	Porcupine, Echidna	Arrernte, Warlpiri, Luritja, Pitjantatjara	Ilparpa	Crown lease
Mount Nancy			Place name	Arrernte, Kaytetye, Amatyerre, Alywarre	Stuart	Special purpose lease
Yarrenyty-Arltere	YARR-WRENCH ARL-DER-AH	Larapinta Larapinta Valley	White devil dog	Arrernte, Pertame, Luritja	Flynn	Special purpose lease
Nyewente	NEW-OONDA	Nywente Oothnarangatcha Trucking Yards	Place name	Arrernte, Luritja	Ciccone	Special purpose lease
Ilparpa	IL-PAR-PA	New Ilparpa	Yam, Bush tucker	Arrernte, Pertame, Luritja	Ilparpa	Special purpose lease
Ilpiye Ilpiye	ILP-EE ILP-EE	Golder's	Needlewood bush, Women's head dress	Arrernte, Kaytetye	Sadadeen	Special purpose lease
Anhelke	UN-EARL-KA	Namatjira's/Driffen's	Full of corkwood honey	Arrernte	Araluen	Unofficial town camp
Irrkerlantye	EAR-KER-LUNGE	White Gate	Kitehawk	Arrernte	East Side	Unofficial town camp

== Violence ==
There is a high rate of domestic violence in the NT in general, including in the camps. Prominent anti-domestic violence campaigner and founding member of the Tangentyere Women’s Family Safety Group, 46-year-old R. Rubuntja, was murdered by her partner, who had a history of violent offences, in January 2021. She had been known for her advocacy: in 2017, she spoke to politicians in Parliament House, Canberra, about domestic violence in Central Australia, and helped to organise a large women's march against violence in Alice Springs. She was elected town camp president of her community at Anthepe Camp in 2019.

Conditions at the town camps attracted renewed attention in 2026 after the killing of Kumanjayi Little Baby, a five-year-old girl, after her alleged abduction by a fellow resident.

== Notable people ==
- Shirleen Campbell, activist against family and domestic violence
- Sally M. Nangala Mulda, artist, lives at Mpwetyerre (Abbotts)
- Albert Namatjira, artist, lived at Akngwertnarre (Morris Soak)
- Geoff Shaw, Aboriginal leader, lives at Mount Nancy
