= Mount Johns, Northern Territory =

Mount Johns Alice Springs, Northern Territory
- Coordinates: 23°43′23″S 133°54′11″E
- Population: 709 (2016 census)
- Postcode(s): 0874
- LGA(s): Town of Alice Springs
- Territory electorate(s): Araluen
- Federal division(s): Lingiari
Mean max temp	Mean min temp	Annual rainfall
28.9 °C; 84 °F	13.3 °C; 56 °F	282.8 mm 11.1 in
Suburbs around Mount Johns:
The Gap	The Gap; Desert Springs; Sadadeen; Undoolya	Hale
The Gap; Flynn; Ross	Mount Johns	Hale
Ross	Ross	Hale
- Footnotes: Adjoining suburbs

Mount Johns is a suburb of the town of Alice Springs, in the Northern Territory, Australia.
