= Ross Highway =

Road in Northern Territory

Ross Highway Northern Territory

General information
- Type: Rural road
- Length: 90 km (56 mi)
- Opened: 1987
- Maintained by: Department of Infrastructure, Planning & Logistics
- Route number(s): State Route 8

Major junctions
- West end: Stuart Highway (National Highway 87)
- East end: Arltunga Historical Reserve, Hart

Location(s)
- Region: Central Australia
- LGA(s): Alice Springs; MacDonnell Region
- Major settlements: Ross, Hale, Hart

Ross Highway is a road in the Northern Territory, Australia located to the south of Alice Springs.

The highway runs from the Stuart Highway in the Alice Springs suburb of Ross in an easterly direction to Ross River where its name changes to Arltunga Road before terminating at Arltunga Historical Reserve in the locality of Hart about 90 kilometres (56 mi) east of Alice Springs.

From west to east, it provides vehicular access to Yeperenye /Emily and Jessie Gaps Nature Park, the community of Amoonguna, Corroboree Rock Conservation Reserve, Trephina Gorge Nature Park, Ross River Resort, N'Dhala Gorge Nature Park and Arltunga Historical Reserve.

The highway is sealed from the Stuart Highway to Ross River and is unsealed for the remainder of its length. It is maintained by the Department of Infrastructure, Planning & Logistics.

The highway was named in 1987 after John Ross, an explorer of Central Australia, whose name has also been given to Ross River. Part of the highway is an existing road which was previously named as Emily Gap Road.

== Major intersections ==
The only major intersection on this road is with the Stuart Highway (National Route 87) in the Alice Springs suburb of Ross.
