= Ross, Northern Territory =

Ross Alice Springs, Northern Territory
- Coordinates: 23°44′47″S 133°54′07″E
- Population: 709 (2016 census)
- Postcode(s): 0870
- Time zone: ACST (UTC+9:30)
- LGA(s): Town of Alice Springs
- Territory electorate(s): Braitling
- Federal division(s): Lingiari
Mean max temp	Mean min temp	Annual rainfall
28.9 °C; 84 °F	13.3 °C; 56 °F	282.8 mm 11.1 in
Suburbs around Ross:
Flynn	Mount Johns	Hale
Ilparpa	Ross	Hale
Kilgariff	Connellan	Amoonguna

Ross is an outer suburb of the town of Alice Springs, in the Northern Territory, Australia. It is on the traditional Country of the Arrernte people.

The suburb is named after John Ross, who explored the area in 1870.

Ross is located within the federal division of Lingiari, the territory electoral division of Braitling and the local government area of the Town of Alice Springs.
