= Sadadeen =

Sadadeen may refer to:

- Sadadeen, Northern Territory, a suburb of Alice Springs
  - Electoral division of Sadadeen, former, between 1983 and 1990
- Charlie Sadadeen (c. 1870–1933), Afghan cameleer and bushman after which the suburb is named
