= 2025 Northern Territory local elections =

- 23 August 2025

16 (Note: All local government areas, with the exception of Barkly Regional Council and Groote Archipelago Regional Council, held an election on 23 August 2025. However, the Northern Territory Electoral Commission (NTEC) considered the election for Coomalie Community Government Council separate from the 2025 local elections, despite it being held concurrently and with the same timetable.) of the 18 local government areas in the Northern Territory (144 of the 164 councillors in the Northern Territory)
- Registered: 151,035
- Turnout: 71,992 (54%)

The 2025 Northern Territory local elections were held on 23 August 2025 to elect the councils of 16 of the 18 local government areas (LGAs) in the Northern Territory. Five councils also held mayoral elections.

One LGA, the Groote Archipelago Region, was formed in September 2024 and held its inaugural election on 16 March 2025. Barkly Regional Council, which was dismissed in June 2024, held an election in November 2024 and did not go to the polls in 2025.

== Background ==
=== Barkly dismissal ===
On 17 October 2023, all elected members of Barkly Regional Council were suspended by the Northern Territory Government because of concerns around fiscal management and service delivery. Following the completion of an investigation into its management, the council was dismissed on 20 June 2024.

An election was held on 2 November 2024, with 21 candidates contesting five wards and the mayoralty. Greens councillor Dianne Stokes was re-elected in Patta Ward.

=== Coomalie dismissal ===
On 22 July 2024, all elected members of Coomalie Community Government Council were suspended because of "serious deficiencies in the conduct of the council's affairs". The council was dismissed on 23 May 2025.

A report found that the council's behaviour had "degenerated significantly" prior to the suspension, and councillors had become divided into "two voting blocs" led by president Sharon Beswick and deputy president Colin Freeman.

=== Proposed mayoral elections removal ===
In April 2025, the Northern Territory Government proposed removing the direct mayoral elections in six councils – Alice Springs, Barkly, Darwin, Katherine, Litchfield and Palmerston – and move to having mayors elected by councillors, as is the case in other twelve LGAs. No decision on the proposal was made by the government before the 2025 local elections.

== Electoral system ==
Northern Territory local elections use proportional representation with the single transferable vote (STV). Voting is compulsory for any person who is on the Northern Territory electoral roll in an address that is within a council area.

Like at territory general elections, the local elections are conducted by the Northern Territory Electoral Commission (NTEC).

== Election timeline ==
The NTEC has advised that the timeline for the local elections will be as follows:

- 11 July – Candidate nominations open
- 22 July (5pm) – Electoral roll closes
- 31 July (12pm) – Candidate nominations close
- 1 August (12pm) – Declaration of nominations
- 11 August – Early voting begins
- 22 August – Early voting ends
- 23 August – Polling day
- 8 September – Declaration of results

== Candidates ==
=== Political parties ===
The Territory Labor Party and Country Liberal Party do not endorse candidates for local elections. The NT Greens endorsed three candidates in 2025; Aia Newport for Alice Springs councillor, Asta Hill for Alice Springs mayor and councillor, and Ellyane Wall for Darwin's Chan Ward. Morgan Rickard, who had served as a Greens councillor for Chan Ward since 2021, did not seek re-election.

== See also ==
- 2025 Alice Springs Town Council election
- 2025 Darwin City Council election
