= Kilgariff, Northern Territory =

Kilgariff
- Suburb
- Interactive map of Kilgariff
- Coordinates: 23°46′30″S 133°53′09″E
- Country: Australia
- State: Northern Territory
- City: Alice Springs
- LGA: Town of Alice Springs
- Location: 1,290 km (800 mi) S of Darwin; 7 km (4.3 mi) S of Alice Springs
- Established: 24 July 2013

Government
  - Territory electorate: Braitling
  - Federal division: Lingiari

Area
  - Total: 10.1 km^{2} (3.9 sq mi)
- Elevation (airport): 546 m (1,791 ft)

Population
  - Total: 349 (2016 census)(part only) (Note: For the 2016 census, Kilgariff was divided into two by the Australian Bureau of Statistics with people living north of Colonel Rose Drive being counted in the "State Suburb of Kilgariff" while those living south of Colonel Rose Drive were counted in the "State Suburb of Connellan".)
  - Density: 34.55/km^{2} (89.5/sq mi)
- Time zone: UTC+9:30 (ACST)
- Postcode: 0873
- Mean max temp: 28.9 °C (84.0 °F)
- Mean min temp: 13.3 °C (55.9 °F)
- Annual rainfall: 282.8 mm (11.13 in)
Suburbs around Kilgariff
Ilparpa	Ross	Ross
Ilparpa; Arumbera	Kilgariff	Connellan
Connellan	Connellan	Connellan

Kilgariff is a suburb of Alice Springs located in the Northern Territory of Australia about 1,290 kilometres (800 mi) south of the territory capital of Darwin and about 7 kilometres (4.3 mi) south of the municipal seat in the Alice Springs central business district. Kilgariff is located within the federal division of Lingiari, the territory electoral division of Braitling and the local government area of the Town of Alice Springs. It is on the traditional Country of the Arrernte people.

== History ==
Kilgariff is situated on the traditional Country of the Arrernte people.

The suburb's name is derived from Bernie Kilgariff, an Alice Springs resident who served as the first Speaker of the Northern Territory Legislative Assembly at its creation in 1974 and who was elected in 1975 as one of the first two senators elected to represent the Northern Territory in the Australian Senate.

== Geography ==
Kilgariff consists of the land bounded by the Stuart Highway to the west, Roger Vale Drive in part to the south and the watercourse of the Todd River to the north-west. As of 2020, its area was 10.1 square kilometres (3.9 sq mi). The land which was formerly part of the suburb of Connellan was created on 24 July 2013.
