= Undoolya =

Undoolya may refer to

- Acacia undoolyana, known as Undoolya wattle
- Undoolya, Northern Territory, a suburb in Australia
- Undoolya Station, a pastoral lease in Australia
