= 2025 Alice Springs Town Council election =

- 23 August 2025

All 9 seats on Alice Springs Town Council
- Registered: 17,020
- Mayor
- Turnout: 55.2% (▼9.8)
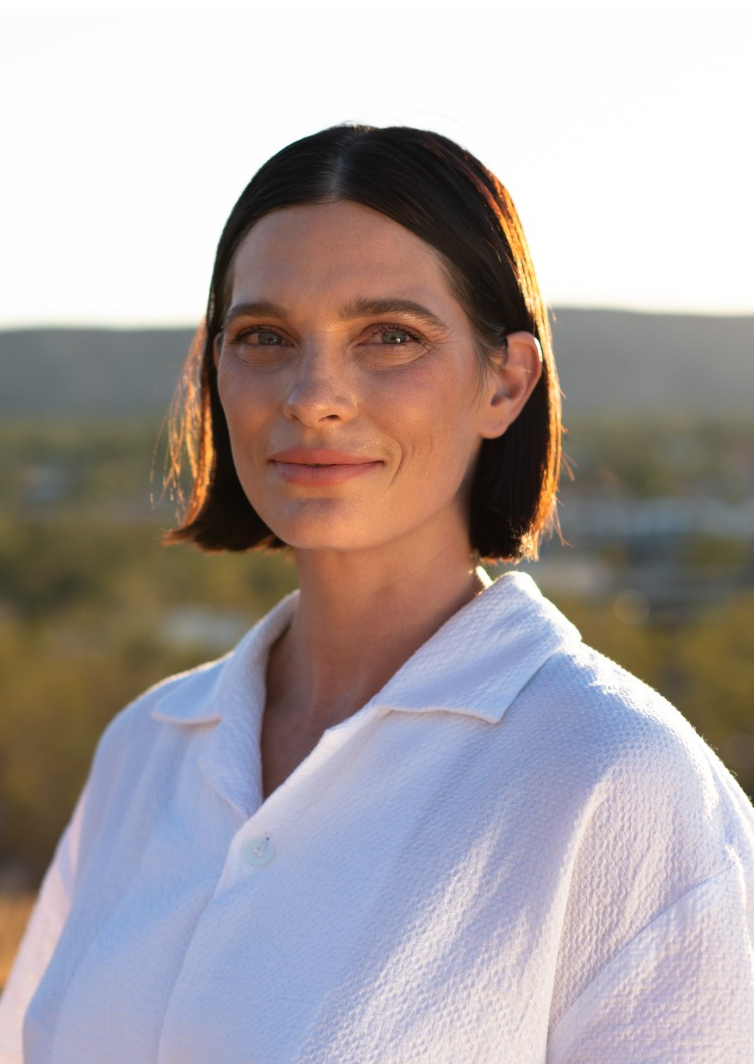
| | First party | Second party | Third party |
|---|---|---|---|
| | | IND | IND |
| Candidate | Asta Hill | Eli Melky | Lisa-Marie Burgoyne |
| Party | Greens | Independent | Ind. Country Liberal |
| Primary vote | 3,005 | 2,804 | 1,885 |
| Percentage | 33.3% | 31.0% | 20.9% |
| Swing | ▲33.3 | ▲11.0 | ▲20.9 |
| TCP | 50.3% | 49.7% |
| TCP swing | ▲50.3 | ▲49.7 |
Mayor before election
Matt Paterson
Independent
Elected Mayor
Asta Hill
Greens
- Councillors
- This shows results prior to the exclusion of Asta Hill.
| Party | Vote % | Seats | +/– |
|---|---|---|---|
| Independents | 39.6 | 3 | −4 |
| Independent Country Liberal | 31.6 | 3 | +2 |
| Greens | 20.8 | 1 | +1 |
| Independent Labor | 5.2 | 1 | 0 |
| Independent UAP | 2.8 | 0 | 0 |
This lists parties that won seats. See the complete results below.

The 2025 Alice Springs Town Council election was held on 23 August 2025 to elect a mayor and eight councillors to the Town of Alice Springs. The election was part of the local government elections held throughout the Northern Territory.

First-term incumbent, Matt Paterson, chose not to seek re-election, and Greens candidate Asta Hill was elected mayor with 50.3% of the two-candidate-preferred vote, defeating Eli Melky.

== Background ==
=== Resignations ===
Three councillors resigned at separate times after the 2021 election. Jimmy Cocking resigned in August 2022 and was replaced by Gavin Morris following a by-election. Steve Brown resigned in March 2024 and – after the cancellation of a by-election – was replaced by Chris Daffy through appointment in November 2024.

In August 2024, Morris was charged with physically assaulting a number of young children. He resigned in March 2025, and his seat was left vacant because the 2025 local elections were to be held shortly.

== Campaign ==
Several issues were prominent during the election campaign. The prospective privatisation of community parks was opposed by the Greens and the independent candidate Louis Miller.

Crime in Alice Springs had been a significant campaign issue at the 2024 NT election and the 2025 federal election, and the problem was also to the fore during the local government elections. The Greens proposed the establishment of "a youth hub on weekend evenings" as a crime prevention strategy.

The future of the Alice Springs Public Library was debated during the campaign. Eli Melky supported moving the library to a new location, while the Greens supported increasing its opening hours.

Greens candidate, Aia Newport, called for an audit of the council's investments "to ensure that there are no ties to Israel or the military industrial complex", as well as the exclusion of Pine Gap and United States military representatives from community events.

== Retiring councillors ==
=== Independent ===
- Marli Banks
- Mark Coffey – announced 22 July 2025
- Chris Daffy
- Kim Hopper
- Michael Liddle – announced 22 July 2025
- Matt Paterson – announced 11 June 2025

== Candidates ==
The Greens endorsed two candidates: Aia Newport for councillor and Asta Hill for mayor and councillor. The Territory Labor Party and Country Liberal Party do not endorse candidates for local elections, although several political party members ran without party endorsement.

A record number of 25 candidates contested the councillor election. Only two incumbent council members sought re-election, with Allison Bitar running for the position of councillor and Eli Melky contesting the mayoral election.

=== Mayoral candidates ===
Candidates are listed in the order they appeared on the ballot.

| Party | Candidate | Notes |
|---|---|---|
| Independent | Louis Miller | Electrical and air conditioning technician |
| Greens | Asta Hill | Lawyer and candidate for Braitling at the 2024 NT election |
| Independent CLP | Lisa-Marie Burgoyne | Events and marketing specialist |
| Independent | Eli Melky | Councillor since 2011 and previous mayoral candidate |
| Independent | Paul Cato | Advised people not to vote for him |
| Independent | Michelle Pettit | Disability support worker and founder of Hello Alice |
| Independent | Wayne Wright | Previous mayoral and councillor candidate |

== Results ==
=== Mayoral results ===
2025 Northern Territory mayoral elections: Alice Springs
| Party | Candidate | Votes | % | ±% |
|---|---|---|---|---|
| Greens | Asta Hill | 3,005 | 33.3 | +33.3 |
| Independent | Eli Melky | 2,804 | 31.0 | +11.0 |
| Independent CLP | Lisa-Marie Burgoyne | 1,885 | 20.9 | +20.9 |
| Independent | Louis Miller | 529 | 5.9 | +5.9 |
| Independent | Michelle Pettit | 399 | 4.4 | +4.4 |
| Independent | Wayne Wright | 243 | 2.7 | +2.1 |
| Independent | Paul Cato | 166 | 1.8 | +1.8 |
| Total formal votes | | 9,031 | 96.1 | +0.5 |
| Informal votes | | 364 | 3.9 | –0.5 |
| Turnout | | 9,395 | 55.2 | –9.8 |
Two-candidate-preferred result
| Greens | Asta Hill | 4,544 | 50.3 | +50.3 |
| Independent | Eli Melky | 4,488 | 49.7 | +49.7 |
| Greens gain from Matt Paterson | | | | |

=== Councillor results ===
2025 Northern Territory local elections: Alice Springs (after Asta Hill exclusion)
| Party | Candidate | Votes | % | ±% |
|---|---|---|---|---|
| Greens | Asta Hill (Note: As Hill was elected mayor, she was eliminated automatically from the councillor election and votes distributed to other candidates based on preferences allocated by voters.) | 1,726 | 19.5 | +19.5 |
| Independent CLP | Sean Heenan (elected 1) | 1,282 | 16.4 | +12.6 |
| Independent CLP | Damien Ryan (elected 2) | 919 | 11.7 | +11.7 |
| Independent | Cherisse Buzzacott (elected 3) | 856 | 10.9 | +10.9 |
| Independent | Larissa Ellis (elected 4) | 637 | 8.1 | +8.1 |
| Greens | Aia Newport (elected 6) | 590 | 7.5 | +7.5 |
| Independent Labor | Allison Bitar (elected 5) | 410 | 5.2 | +1.0 |
| Independent CLP | Darren Burton (elected 8) | 305 | 3.9 | +1.3 |
| Independent | Jonny Rowden | 299 | 3.8 | +3.8 |
| Independent | Stuart McGifford | 270 | 3.5 | +3.5 |
| Independent | Danial Rochford (elected 7) | 259 | 3.3 | +3.3 |
| Independent | Mona Ulak | 240 | 3.1 | +3.1 |
| Independent | Michelle Pettit | 235 | 3.0 | +3.0 |
| Independent | Sophie Marriott | 197 | 2.5 | +2.5 |
| Independent UAP | Gatkuoth S.D. Kueth | 189 | 2.4 | +2.4 |
| Independent | Joshua Brown | 184 | 2.4 | +2.4 |
| Independent | Louis Miller | 180 | 2.3 | +2.3 |
| Independent CLP | Vanessa Mounsey | 132 | 1.7 | +1.7 |
| Independent | Parveen Kumar | 124 | 1.6 | +1.6 |
| Independent | Wayne Wright | 111 | 1.5 | +1.5 |
| Independent Labor | Tom Brady | 95 | 1.2 | +1.2 |
| Independent | Jane Clark | 89 | 1.1 | +1.1 |
| Independent | Max Broadway | 81 | 1.0 | +1.0 |
| Independent | Masum Billah | 67 | 0.9 | +0.9 |
| Independent | Tia Roko | 66 | 0.8 | +0.8 |
| Total formal votes | | 8,863 | 94.4 | |
| Informal votes | | 527 | 5.6 | |
| Turnout | | 9,390 | 55.2 | |

Total formal and informal votes are based on results prior to the exclusion of Asta Hill.

== See also ==
- 2025 Northern Territory local elections
