= 2025 Darwin City Council election =

Election of lord mayor and 12 councillors to the City of Darwin

- 23 August 2025

All 13 seats on Darwin City Council
- Registered: 51,716
- Lord Mayor
- Turnout: 63.2%
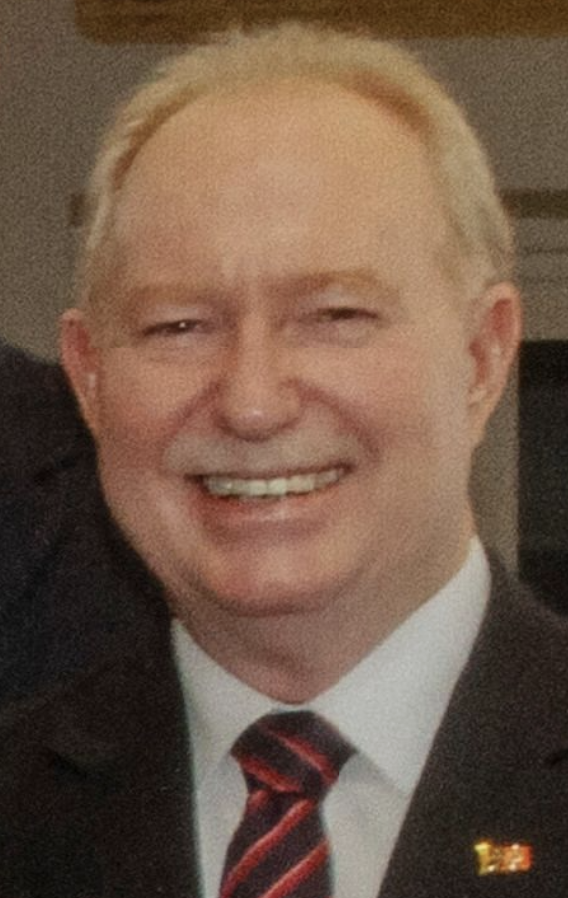

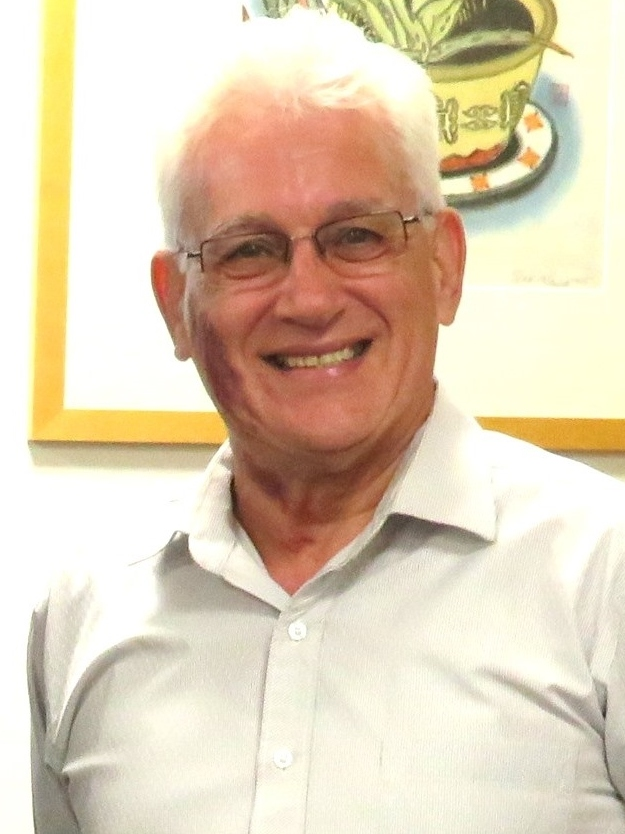
	First party	Second party	Third party
			IND
Candidate	Peter Styles	Kon Vatskalis	Julie Fraser
Party	Independent	Independent	Independent
Primary vote	6,786	6,226	3,181
Percentage	22.6%	20.7%	10.6%
Swing	▲22.6	▼36.5	▲10.6
TCP	53.3%		46.7%
TCP swing	▲53.3		▼46.7
Lord Mayor before election
Kon Vatskalis
Independent
Elected Lord Mayor
Peter Styles
Independent
- Councillors
Party	Vote %	Seats	+/–
Independents		10	+5
Independent Labor		2	−2
Independent CLP		1	−1
Greens		0	−1
This lists parties that won seats. See the complete results below.

The 2025 Darwin City Council election was held on 23 August 2025 to elect a lord mayor and twelve councillors to the City of Darwin. The election was part of the local government elections held throughout the Northern Territory.

In a field of thirteen candidates, Peter Styles defeated incumbent mayor Kon Vatskalis. Vatskalis did not concede to Styles, claiming electoral fraud.

== Retiring councillors ==
=== Greens ===
- Morgan Rickard (Chan Ward)

=== Independent Labor ===
- Vim Sharma (Richardson Ward)
- Rebecca Want de Rowe (Richardson Ward)

== Candidates ==
=== Lord Mayor ===
Candidates are listed in the order they appeared on the ballot.

Party	Candidate	Background
Independent	Kon Vatskalis	Lord Mayor of Darwin since 2017
Independent	Peter Styles	Former Deputy Chief Minister
Independent	Andrew John Arthur	Former Darwin councillor
Independent	Vicki Bonson	Founder of Fannie Bay Free Feeds
Independent	Leah Potter	Comedian and candidate lord mayor in 2021
Independent	Sylvia Klonaris	Councillor for Waters Ward since 2021
Independent	Robin Lawrence	Candidate for Lord Mayor in 2021
Independent	Sam Weston	Councillor for Lyons Ward since 2023
Independent	Nicole Brown	2022 City of Darwin Citizen of the Year
Independent	Julie Fraser	Union organiser
Independent	Amye Un	Councillor for Lyons Ward since 2021
Independent	Scarlet D'Arc	
Independent	Edwin Joseph	Candidate for Richardson Ward in 2017 and 2021

== Results ==
=== Lord Mayor ===
2025 Northern Territory local elections: Darwin
Party	Candidate	Votes	%	±%
Independent	Peter Styles	6,786	22.6	
Independent	Kon Vatskalis	6,226	20.7	
Independent	Sylvia Klonaris	3,209	10.7	
Independent	Julie Fraser	3,181	10.6	
Independent	Sam Weston	2,908	9.7	
Independent	Edwin Joseph	2,140	7.1	
Independent	Nicole Brown	1,440	4.8	
Independent	Amye Un	1,012	3.4	
Independent	Andrew John Arthur	1,061	3.5	
Independent	Leah Potter	909	3.0	
Independent	Vicki Bonson	516	1.7	
Independent	Scarlet D'Arc	457	1.5	
Independent	Robin Lawrence	196	0.7	
Total formal votes		30,041	91.9	
Informal votes		2,659	8.1	
Turnout		32,700	63.2	
Two-candidate-preferred result
Independent	Peter Styles	15,999	53.3	
Independent	Julie Fraser	14,043	46.7	
Peter Styles gain from Kon Vatskalis				

=== Chan ===
2025 Northern Territory local elections: Chan Ward
Party	Candidate	Votes	%	±%
Independent Labor	Ed Smelt (elected 1)	2,095	28.0	
Independent	Julie Fraser (elected 2)	1,873	25.0	
Independent	Peter Pangquee (elected 3)	1,022	13.6	
Greens	Ellyane Wall	775	10.3	
Independent	Gary Strachan	720	9.6	
Independent	Clarence CJ McCarthy-Grogan	552	7.4	
Independent	Lenny	335	4.5	
Independent	Manik Gowda	118	1.6	
Total formal votes		7,490	95.2	
Informal votes		374	4.8	
Turnout		7,864	62.0	

=== Lyons ===
2025 Northern Territory local elections: Lyons Ward
Party	Candidate	Votes	%	±%
Independent	Sam Weston (elected 1)	1,674	23.2	
Independent CLP	Mick Palmer (elected 2)	1,362	18.8	
Independent	Brett Hagan	866	12.0	
Independent	Nicole Brown (elected 3)	793	11.0	
Independent	Amye Un	659	9.1	
Independent	Nick O'Loughlin	518	7.2	
Independent	Vicki Bonson	400	5.5	
Independent	Scarlet D'Arc	353	4.9	
Independent	Mark Barnes	342	4.7	
Independent	Andrew Lee	262	3.6	
Total formal votes		7,229	94.0	
Informal votes		461	6.0	
Turnout		7,690	60.3	

=== Richardson ===
2025 Northern Territory local elections: Richardson Ward (after Peter Styles exclusion)
Party	Candidate	Votes	%	±%
Independent Labor	Jimmy Bouhoris (elected 1)	3,195	38.2	
Independent	Shani Carson (elected 2)	2,390	28.6	
Independent	Edwin Joseph (elected 3)	1,769	21.2	
Independent	Andrew John Arthur	766	9.2	
Independent	Yulita Villanueva	238	2.8	
Independent	Peter Styles (Note: Because Peter Styles was elected Lord Mayor, his 1,915 votes (23.5%) in the Richardson Ward councillor election were automatically distributed to other candidates based on the preferences allocated by voters.)	–	–	
Total formal votes		8,150	96.3	
Informal votes		314	3.7	
Turnout		8,464	66.1	

Total formal and informal votes are based on results prior to the exclusion of Peter Styles.

=== Waters ===
2025 Northern Territory local elections: Waters Ward
Party	Candidate	Votes	%	±%
Independent	Sylvia Klonaris (elected 1)	2,170	28.0	
Independent	Patrik Ralph (elected 2)	1,958	25.3	
Independent	Kim Farrar (elected 3)	1,246	16.1	
Independent	Mirella Fejo	960	12.4	
Independent	Tejinder Singh	610	7.9	
Independent	Robin Lawrence	354	4.6	
Independent	Manoli Papathomas	303	3.9	
Independent	Otto Kainulainen	139	1.8	
Total formal votes		7,740	94.7	
Informal votes		436	5.3	
Turnout		8,176	60.7	

== See also ==
- 2025 Northern Territory local elections
