= Little Flower Mission =

Catholic mission in Alice Springs, Northern Territory, Australia

Little Flower Mission was an Australian religious organization, which operated from 1938 to 1942. It was a mission to Eastern Arrernte people who were living in and around the township of Alice Springs. The mission was established by Catholic missionaries, part of the Missionaries of the Sacred Heart order.

== Establishment ==
Dr. Charles Duguid, a Presbyterian social reformer and Aboriginal rights activist, inspired the creation of the mission after sharing his condemnation of conditions for Aboriginal people in Alice Springs. Responding to Duguid's call the mission was established in 1935 by Catholic priest Father Patrick Moloney and the lay missionary Francis McGarry.

Father Moloney, who had previous experience establishing missions (Palm Island in 1931 and Menindee in 1933) originally planned for the mission to seek Aboriginal people who had little contact with Europeans but, after 2 unsuccessful expeditions into the desert, he decided that Eastern Arrernte fringe-dwellers in Alice Springs, would be the most amenable to the mission and also some of the most in need. At this time McGarry wrote home to his family that many of the Eastern Arrernte people that he met were "in such a deplorable condition" and that there was "practically no food". This lack of food, caused by the devastating impacts of colonisation, was a major factor that attracted so many Arrernte people to the many missions that were established in Alice Springs. Wenten Rubuntja, who would go on to become a famous Aboriginal artist, recalled that "all the priests would feed people" and that "all those churches were all right - they were all holy".

The mission was established 1 October 1935, on the feast day of St Thérèse of Lisieux, who is also known as the 'Little Flower'. It was initially located in the Alice Springs town centre, on Bath Street. It is often said that McGarry played a uniquely pivotal role in the mission, because Father Moloney believed that St Thérèse had meant the Mission to be McGarry's, not his, as officially it had to be.

At the new mission, McGarry fed, clothed, and taught Aboriginal children at the presbytery every day and, after interest from the adults, began teaching adult catechism classes, too. This drew ire from many people living in Alice Springs who were horrified and told Moloney that he was "the most popular man in the town until you brought those black children into our town," and that in trying to teach the children "it was like giving strawberries to pigs". It was this resistance, and the fact that the town was a prohibited area, that necessitated the move of the mission to Charles Creek in 1937.

== Move to Charles Creek ==
The missions new location on the Charles River, nearby the Alice Springs Telegraph Station (which was then operating at The Bungalow), was on the town's northern boundary and was still only a short walk to the presbytery. To allow this move the government agreed to increase the size of the Aboriginal Reserve around the Telegraph Station and it came to include all the land on the eastern side of the Charles River as far south as it met with the Todd River; this significantly increased the grazing land for the Bungalow's goat herd which supplied milk for the children.

At this new site McGarry, and the newly arrived Brother Ed Bennett, sank a well and built a schoolroom, kitchen and laundry; working side-by-side with Arrernte men from the mission. Following the completion of these buildings, and after forming an advisory council of 8 senior Aboriginal men, they pegged out plots on the mission site for each family and built Wurlies on them. These wurlies, arranged into 'streets', were made of wooden framework and covered with old iron, bags and grass. These wurlies, called ‘Camp IV’, were not approved by the government and regularly drew ire from Alice Springs residents who complained about the proximity of the camp to town.

A mission census in April 1937 counted 113 people in residence at the mission: sixty children, twenty six women and twenty seven men; living in thirty seven wurlies. By August 1938 there were 140 people living at the mission in thirty nine wurlies: fifty children, forty women and fifty men. The mission continued to grow and, by February 1940, the population had reached 221.

== Move to Arltunga ==
In 1942, following the bombing of Darwin, the mission was forced to move from Alice Springs as the town became a base and large numbers of soldiers moved to the town. The mission was ordered to relocate approximately 100 km north to Arltunga, a former mining town, which is now the Arltunga Historical Reserve. According to testament of former residents, many people died there and children were separated from their families for extended periods of time.

McGarry was asked to leave the mission shortly after the move was completed; likely due to his fraught relationship with the sisters of Our Lady of the Sacred Heart.

At this site it became known as the Arltunga Mission and, in 1953, it moved again to Santa Teresa (now known as: Ltyentye Apurte Community).

== People associated with Little Flower Mission ==
- Francis McGarry
- Wenten Rubuntja
- Margaret Kemarre Turner

== Commemoration ==
Little Flower Court, in the Anthelk-Ewlpaye (Charles Creek) Town Camp, is named for the mission and it is located on the original site of the mission.
