= Geoffrey Shaw =

Geoffrey Shaw or Geoff Shaw may refer to:

- Geoff Shaw (minister) (1927–1978), Church of Scotland minister and Labour politician
- Geoffrey Turton Shaw (1879–1943), English composer and musician
- Geoff Shaw (politician) (born 1967), Australian politician
- Geoffrey Shaw (MP) (1896–1960), British politician and barrister
- Geoff Shaw (rugby union) (born 1948), Australian international rugby union player and captain
- Geoff Shaw (Aboriginal leader), Aboriginal leader in Alice Springs

== See also ==
- Jeffrey Shaw (disambiguation)
