= Shirleen =

Shirleen is a female given name. It may refer to:

- Shirleen Campbell (born 1981), Indigenous Australian activist against family and domestic violence
- Shirleen Roeder, American geneticist
