= Larapinta =

Larapinta is the Arrernte (Aboriginal language) name for the Finke River in Australia

Larapinta may also refer to:

- Larapinta (TV series), a 2023 Australian TV series about the Finke River, its people and surrounds
- Larapinta, Northern Territory, a suburb of Alice Springs, NT
- Larapinta, Queensland, a suburb of Brisbane, Queensland
- Larapinta Trail, a walking track in the Northern Territory
