= Kilgariff =

Kilgariff or Kilgarriff is a surname. Notable people with the surname include:

== People ==
- Adam Kilgarriff (1960–2015), British corpus linguist
- Bernie Kilgariff (1923–2010), Australian politician
- Karen Kilgariff (born 1970), American actress and writer
- Michael Kilgarriff (born 1937), British actor

== Places ==
- Kilgarriff, County Cork, a civil parish in County Cork, Ireland
- Kilgariff, Northern Territory, a suburb in Australia
