= Francis McGarry =

Australian Catholic lay missionary (1897–1955)

Francis James McGarry (11 July 1897 – 21 November 1955) was a Catholic lay missionary and Protector of Aborigines who was instrumental in the establishment and day-to-day management of the Little Flower Mission in Central Australia.

== Early life ==
McGarry was born on 11 July 1897 in Wagga Wagga in New South Wales, the younger of twins and sixth child, born to John McGarry, a butcher, and his wife Catherine Elizabeth, née Jones. When his father died the family moved to Sydney where they settled in Manly and McGarry attended Marist Brothers' High School in Darlinghurst. After completing schooling McGarry worked as a clerk and warehouseman at Peterson Laing and Bruce.

McGarry served in World War I, first joining the 17th Battalion, an infantry militia, aged 18. Following this, on 28 July 1917, he enlisted in the First Australian Imperial Force with whom he served as a truck driver in the 45th Battalion in France from August 1918. He was discharged, uninjured, on 13 September 1919.

Following his return in 1922, McGarry joined the St Vincent De Paul Society where he was a weekly visitor at the Leprosarium at Little Bay, New South Wales from 1926; an act that he hid from people due to concerns about his exposure to infectious disease. On these visits McGarry offered to give pastoral care as well as delivering requested items - such as books and newspapers - to patients.

== Life in the Northern Territory ==
=== Little Flower Mission ===
McGarry moved to the Northern Territory in 1935 to assist Father P. J. Moloney in establishing the Little Flower Mission, which began in Alice Springs. In the early days, the mission was on Bath Street in the centre of Alice Springs, although it moved to the banks of Charles Creek, near the Alice Springs Telegraph Station which was then operating as The Bungalow. McGarry employed Arrernte men to build the mission here this included erecting combined church and school and Wurlies, a form of humpies, for accommodating families.

During this period McGarry fed, clothed, and taught Aboriginal children at the mission. He did not allow the children to speak the Arrernte language. He believed that he was working quietly towards the elimination of Arrernte cultural practices, believing that they conflicted with Christianity. Examples of this include the expulsion of people in polygamous relationships from the mission camp and he believed that male initiation rites were excessively brutal and that the process made conversion to Christianity more difficult. McGarry wrote in a letter to his family that:

"Corroborees contrary to the Church will die out in time. However...I am trying to make it a quick process."

— Francis McGarry, Letter from Francis McGarry to the McGarry family, 25 July 1938, McGarry Papers.

In these early years McGarry also obtained most of the mission's food by seeking donations and bargaining for goods in Alice Springs as well as from family and the St Vincent de Paul Society. McGarry also sold Aboriginal artefacts and weapons that were made at the mission. A key part of his missionary work was also hospital visitation, where he tended to patients and fomented deathbed conversions.

In April 1938 McGarry lost his teaching role when the Sisters of Our Lady of the Sacred Heart took over the school. McGarry found this transition very difficult and tried to maintain influence over the school, causing considerable tension with the sisters and the missionary community.

In 1942, following the bombing of Darwin, Alice Springs became a major army staging base and the mission was ordered to relocate to Arltunga, 110 km (68 miles) east of Alice Springs, which was a former mining town. To complete this move, which took two years, McGarry was responsible for locating water, building roads and escorting people to the new location. However, when the move was completed in March 1944 McGarry's role was no longer needed; the reason for this is not clear but the letters of Bishop Francis Xavier Gsell suggest that it was due to McGarry's poor relationship with the sisters.

=== Career with the Native Affairs Branch ===
In September 1944 McGarry accepted a position with the Northern Territory's Native Affairs Branch, initially as a patrol officer; a position that he had been offered earlier. In 1946, after a number of more short-term roles, McGarry was posted as superintendent of the newly established Yuendumu settlement, delivering rations and welfare services to Warlpiri and Anmatyerre people who had been displaced from their homelands and traditional food sources.

This position was, however, short-lived with McGarry being asked to step down from the role in 1948 (although he was told that he could apply for the role of the assistant). This may have been due to enforcement of the policy that only married men could be employed as superintendent or that McGarry's attitude to the arrival of Baptist missionaries was problematic. McGarry did write in a letter home that:

They will put no one over me, so ... I soon may be cutting your lawn

— Francis McGarry, Letter from Francis McGarry to the McGarry family, 9 June 1948, McGarry Papers.

McGarry resigned from his post on 20 July 1948.

== Later life ==
Following his resignation McGarry returned to Sydney, where he worked as a salesman at an auctioneers in Manly before becoming a night-watchman in order to keep his days free for charity work at the St Vincent de Paul opportunity shop.

On 21 November 1955, aged 58, McGarry died of meningitis, after a short illness. He was buried at Frenchs Forest Bushland Cemetery.

His cause for beatification was sent to the Vatican in 1970.
