= Town of Alice Springs =

Alice Springs Town Council
- Local government area
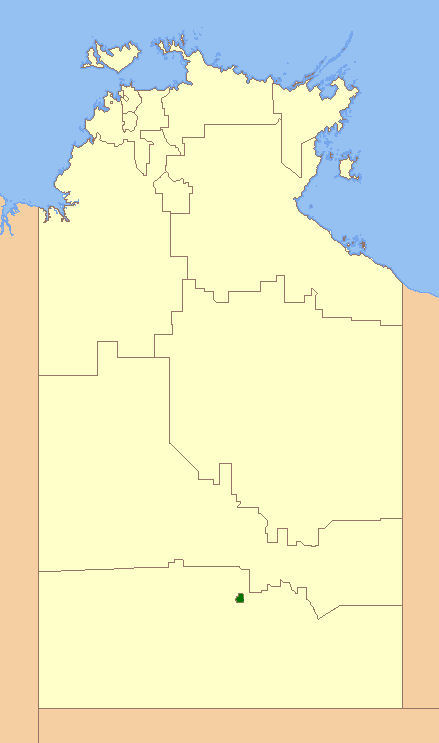
- Location of Alice Springs Town Council

- Interactive map of Alice Springs Town Council
- Country: Australia
- State: Northern Territory
- Region: Alice Springs Region
- Established: 1971
- Council seat: Alice Springs

Government
  - Mayor: Asta Hill
  - Territory electorate: Araluen, Braitling, Namatjira
  - Federal division: Lingiari

Area
  - Total: 328 km^{2} (127 sq mi)

Population
  - Total: 26,534 (2018)
  - Density: 80.90/km^{2} (209.5/sq mi)
- Website: Alice Springs Town Council
LGAs around Alice Springs Town Council
MacDonnell Regional Council	MacDonnell Regional Council	MacDonnell Regional Council
MacDonnell Regional Council	Alice Springs Town Council	MacDonnell Regional Council
MacDonnell Regional Council	MacDonnell Regional Council	MacDonnell Regional Council

The Alice Springs Town Council is a local government area in the Northern Territory. On 1 July 1971, Alice Springs was gazetted as a Municipality with the town council elected on 25 July 1971. It is situated 1,498 kilometres (931 mi) south of Darwin. The council governs an area of 328 square kilometres (127 sq mi) and had a population of 26,534 in June 2018.

== History ==
The town of Alice Springs is located in Arrernte Country. Its traditional name is Mparntwe. Alice Springs is an established residential township with a commercial area and rural areas on the outskirts of the town. European settlement of the area dates from 1862.

The current mayor is Asta Hill. She was elected in August 2025. In addition to the Mayor, the Council contains eight other Councillors.

== Council ==
=== Mayorship ===
Name	Role	Elected	Took office
Asta Hill	Mayor	23 August 2025	23 August 2025
Allison Bitar	Deputy Mayor	23 August 2025	23 August 2025

=== Current composition ===
Name	Party
Asta Hill	Greens
Sean Heenan	Independent CLP
Damien Ryan	Independent CLP
Cherisse Buzzacott	Independent
Larissa Ellis	Independent
Aia Newport	Greens
Allison Bitar	Independent Labor
Danial Rochford	Independent
Darren Burton	Independent CLP

== Election results ==
=== 2025 ===
2025 Northern Territory local elections: Alice Springs (after Asta Hill exclusion)
Party	Candidate	Votes	%	±%
Greens	Asta Hill (Note: As Hill was elected mayor, she was eliminated automatically from the councillor election and votes distributed to other candidates based on preferences allocated by voters.)	1,726	19.5	+19.5
Independent CLP	Sean Heenan (elected 1)	1,282	16.4	+12.6
Independent CLP	Damien Ryan (elected 2)	919	11.7	+11.7
Independent	Cherisse Buzzacott (elected 3)	856	10.9	+10.9
Independent	Larissa Ellis (elected 4)	637	8.1	+8.1
Greens	Aia Newport (elected 6)	590	7.5	+7.5
Independent Labor	Allison Bitar (elected 5)	410	5.2	+1.0
Independent CLP	Darren Burton (elected 8)	305	3.9	+1.3
Independent	Jonny Rowden	299	3.8	+3.8
Independent	Stuart McGifford	270	3.5	+3.5
Independent	Danial Rochford (elected 7)	259	3.3	+3.3
Independent	Mona Ulak	240	3.1	+3.1
Independent	Michelle Pettit	235	3.0	+3.0
Independent	Sophie Marriott	197	2.5	+2.5
Independent UAP	Gatkuoth S.D. Kueth	189	2.4	+2.4
Independent	Joshua Brown	184	2.4	+2.4
Independent	Louis Miller	180	2.3	+2.3
Independent CLP	Vanessa Mounsey	132	1.7	+1.7
Independent	Parveen Kumar	124	1.6	+1.6
Independent	Wayne Wright	111	1.5	+1.5
Independent Labor	Tom Brady	95	1.2	+1.2
Independent	Jane Clark	89	1.1	+1.1
Independent	Max Broadway	81	1.0	+1.0
Independent	Masum Billah	67	0.9	+0.9
Independent	Tia Roko	66	0.8	+0.8
Total formal votes		8,863	94.4	
Informal votes		527	5.6	
Turnout		9,390	55.2	

Total formal and informal votes are based on results prior to the exclusion of Asta Hill.

== Suburbs ==
- Alice Springs
- Araluen
- Arumbera
- Braitling
- Ciccone
- Connellan
- Desert Springs
- East Side
- Flynn
- Gillen
- Ilparpa
- Irlpme
- Kilgariff
- Larapinta
- Mount Johns
- Ross
- Sadadeen
- Stuart
- The Gap
- Undoolya
- White Gums
