= Araluen, Northern Territory =

Araluen
- Suburb
- Interactive map of Araluen
- Coordinates: 23°42′8″S 133°50′59″E
- Country: Australia
- State: Northern Territory
- City: Alice Springs
- LGA: Town of Alice Springs

Government
  - Territory electorate: Araluen
  - Federal division: Lingiari

Area
  - Total: 4.2 km^{2} (1.6 sq mi)

Population
  - Total: 2,673 (2021 census)
  - Density: 636/km^{2} (1,648/sq mi)
- Postcode: 0870
- Mean max temp: 28.9 °C (84.0 °F)
- Mean min temp: 13.3 °C (55.9 °F)
- Annual rainfall: 282.8 mm (11.13 in)
Suburbs around Araluen
Larapinta		Braitling
	Araluen	Ciccone
		Gillen

Araluen is a suburb of the town of Alice Springs, in the Northern Territory, Australia. It is on the western side of the town, which lies on the traditional country of the Arrernte people.

The name of the suburb is an Aboriginal word meaning "place of waterlilies". The subdivision on which the suburb was built was named after the property belonging to aviation pioneer Edward Connellan, which in turn was named after his parents' property in Victoria.

Araluen, in the Town of Alice Springs, is situated in the Arrernte traditional Indigenous Australians country.

Araluen Cultural Precinct contains the Araluen Arts Centre, the Museum of Central Australia, Strehlow Research Centre and other cultural bodies and sites.
