= John Flynn's Grave Historical Reserve (Alice Springs) =

Protected area in the Northern Territory, Australia

John Flynn's Grave Historic Reserve
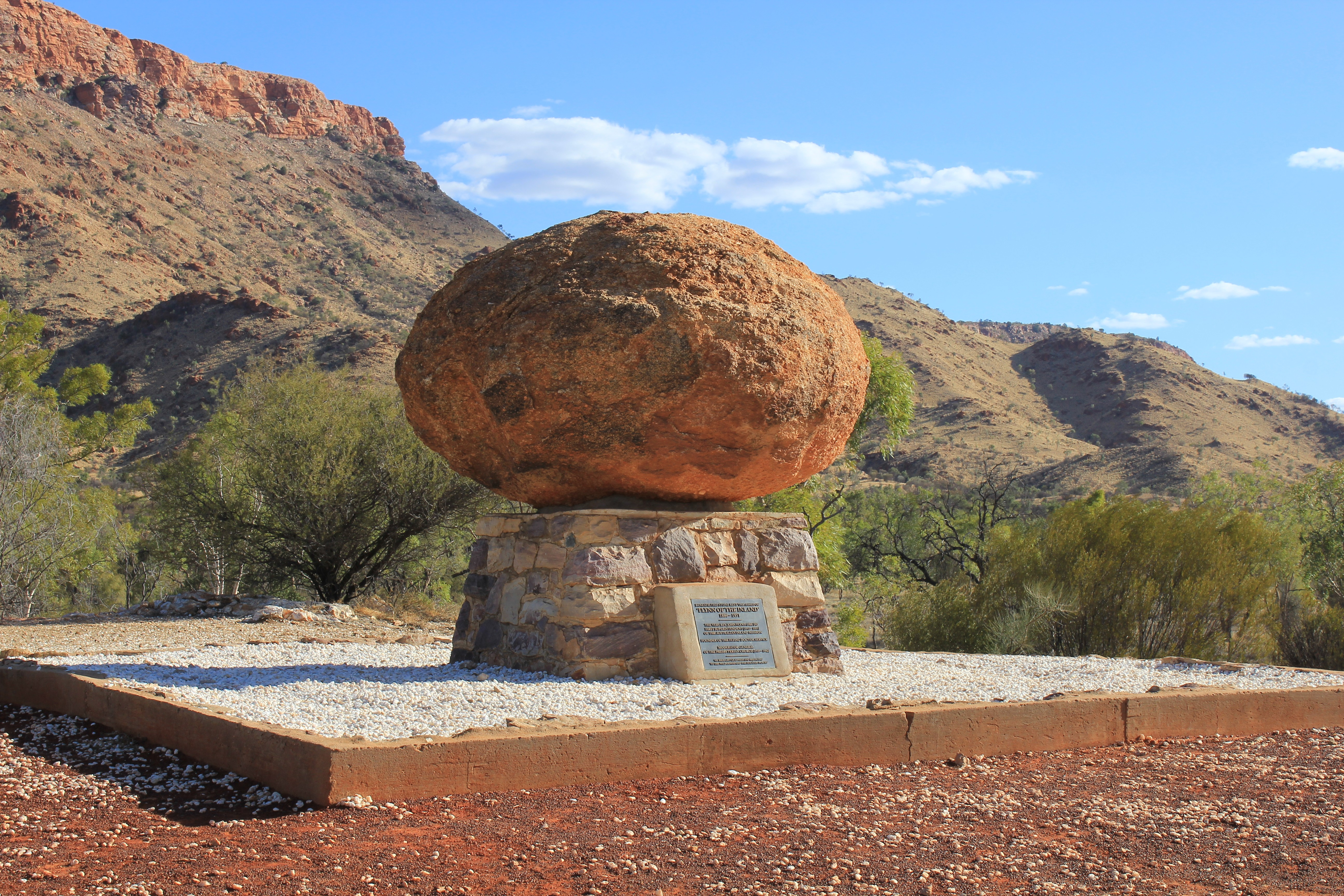
- John Flynn's Grave, Alice Springs, Australia

- Location within Northern Territory
- Location: Northern Territory, Flynn
- Nearest city: Alice Springs
- Coordinates: 23°41′53″S 133°49′09″E
- Area: 0.34 ha (0.84 acres)
- Established: 21 March 1957
- Governing body: Parks and Wildlife Commission of the Northern Territory

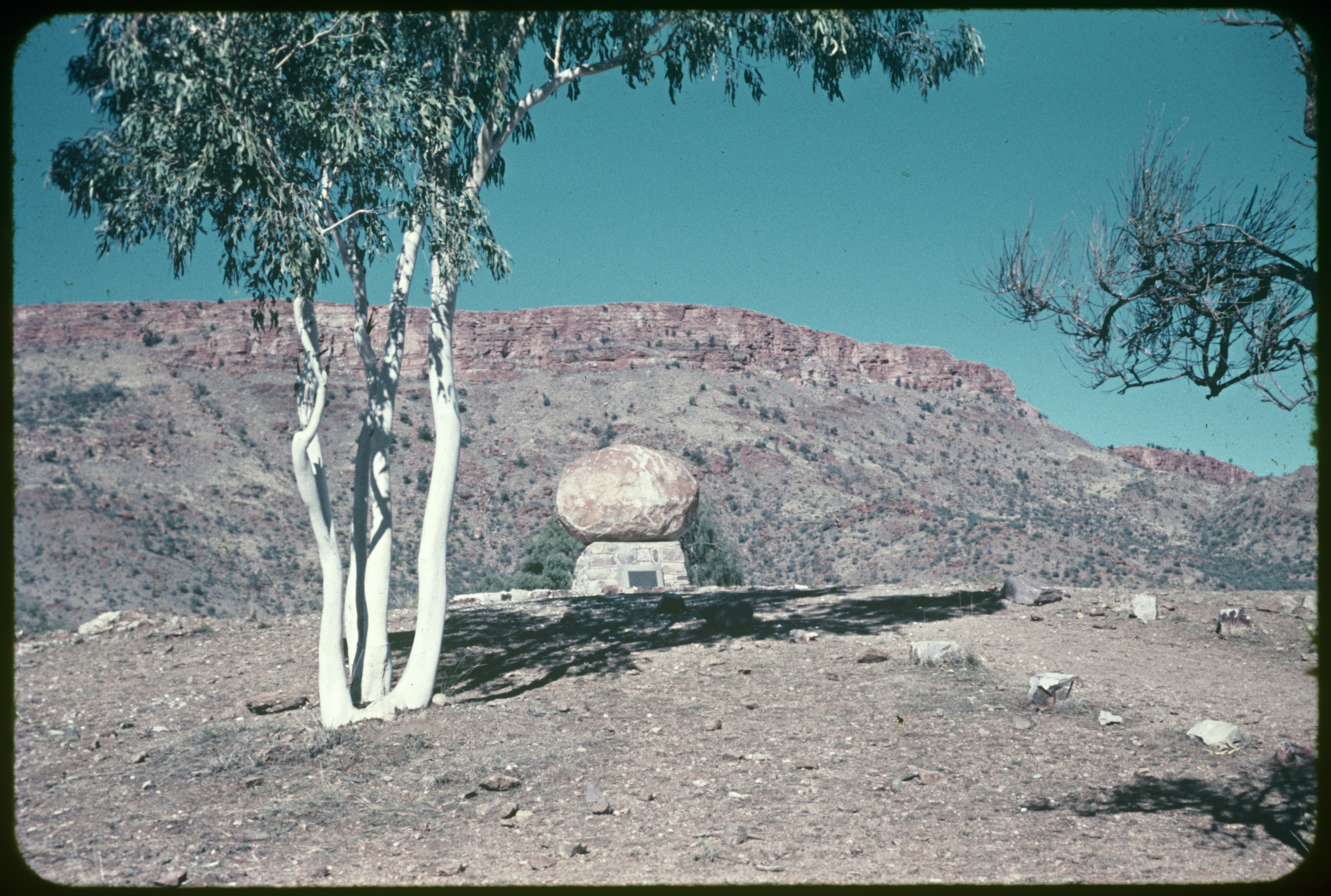
John Flynn's Grave in 1957 or 1958

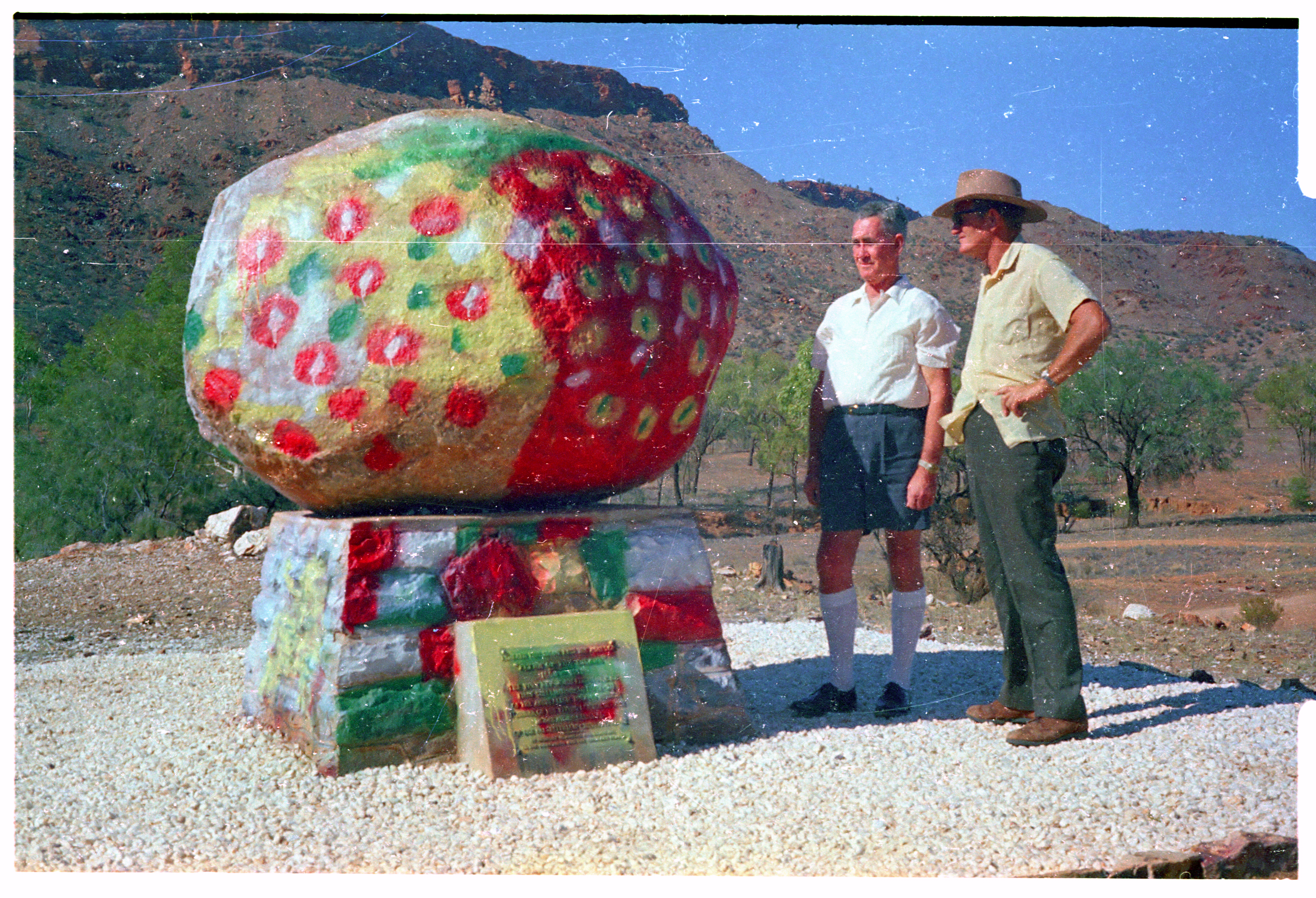
The grave following being painted in January 1972

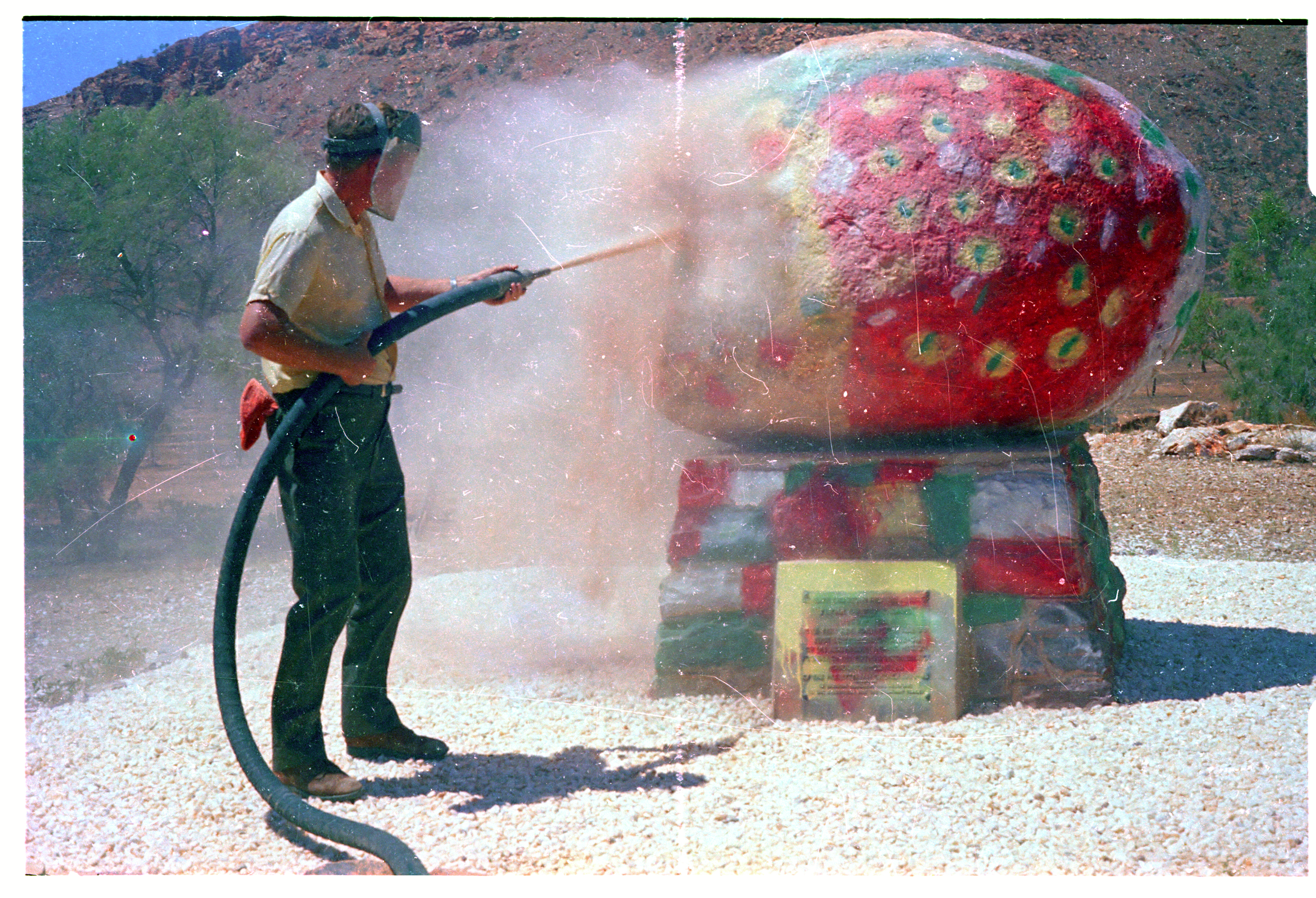
The grave being sand blasted after being painted, January 1972

John Flynn's Grave Historical Reserve, more commonly referred to as Flynn's Grave is the grave site of John Flynn who was an Australian Presbyterian minister who founded the Australian Inland Mission (AIM) and the Royal Flying Doctor Service. The grave, which is now a historical reserve, is located at the base of Mount Gillen on Larapinta Drive in the Alice Springs suburb of Flynn.

The grave is also used as a marker to the start of the informal walk to the summit of Mount Gillen.

== History ==
John Flynn died in Sydney on 5 May 1951 and, as requested, his ashes were flown to Alice Springs where they were buried in a temporary location near this site. A funeral was held here on 23 May 1951 with over 500 people in attendance. A more permanent grave was finalised in August 1953 when the urn containing his ashes was placed into a newly built monument and a boulder was placed over it. Having a boulder covering the grave was chosen by his wife Jean Flynn, later also buried here (14 November 1976), who was motivated by the biblical story of a large rock being rolled over the grave of Jesus. At this time a plaque was also placed on the grave saying that Flynn "brought gladness and rejoicing to the wilderness and the solitary places".

An appropriate boulder could not be found nearby Alice Springs, and the surrounding MacDonnell Ranges, and one was chosen from the Karlu Karlu / Devils Marbles Conservation Reserve located 400 kilometres (250 mi) north. This eight-tonne boulder was taken without permission from the traditional owners of the site, the Warumungu and Kaytetye people. The Warumungu and Kaytetye believe that these boulders have extraordinary powers and that their damage, or removal, can have life threatening consequences for them. Additional concerns were also raised by Arrernte people, in Alice Springs, who were concerned with the presence of this sacred stone on their land.

Following the completion of the grave John Flynn's Grave Historical Reserve was proclaimed on 21 March 1957 under the Crown Lands Act and again under the Territory Parks and Wildlife Conservation Act on 30 June 1978. The primary focus of the reserve and its historical significance relates to John Flynn's Grave but it is also the site of the Alkate Hills, an Arrernte sacred site, which covers most of the area.

In 1972 four young men, 1 plasterer and 3 bakers, were charged with 'malicious damage to a monument to the dead' following vandalisation of the grave, in the early hours of 1 January, which they covered in psychedelic designs. The then Mayor of Alice Springs, Jock Nelson, called their actions a "completely brainless and stupid act".

Dissatisfaction with the use of the sacred stone continued and in 1980-1981 meetings were held between the Uniting Church and various Aboriginal representatives were held and it was agreed that a search would commence for a replacement boulder although controversy following this agreement meant that this did not happen at this time.

Negotiation recommenced in 1996 between Central Land Council, the Uniting Church, the Aboriginal Areas Protection Authority and the Parks and Wildlife Commission of the NT. After considerable effort and input a suitable rock was identified in late 1998 and the Warumungu\Kaytetye stone was replaced with an Arrernte one; this time associated with Yeperenye (Caterpillar) Dreaming. The Arrernte people allowed this boulder to be used as a "sincere sign of reconciliation" despite its own significance to their people. The boulder from Karlu Karlu was returned to its original site.

== Designations ==
The historical reserve was listed on the now-defunct Register of the National Estate on 21 October 1980 and on the Northern Territory Heritage Register on 18 October 2003. As of 2018, it had not given an International Union for Conservation of Nature protected area category.

== See also ==
- Protected areas of the Northern Territory
