= Margaret Kemarre Turner =

Aboriginal Arrernte linguist (1938–2023)

Margaret Kemarre Turner, also known as M. K. Turner, OAM (18 October 1938 – 5 July 2023) was an Arrernte woman, who belonged to the Akarre people. Turner was an elder in her community, an interpreter, artist and author. She was also involved with the Institute for Aboriginal Development in Alice Springs, Northern Territory, Australia where she taught language, culture and cross-cultural courses.

== Early life ==
Turner was born near Spotted Tiger region of Harts Range, Northern Territory, approximately 215 km north-east of Alice Springs. Her family was moved off the land due to an influx of miners and the creation of a large army base during World War II.

The family were initially moved by the government to the Catholic Church's Little Flower Mission in 1937 on Charles Creek; nearby The Bungalow.

The family were moved again, in 1942, by the army to the Catholic mission at Arltunga and, within a few years, they were moved to Santa Teresa Mission, now Ltyentye Apurte, where she started her formal education.

== Career ==
Turner had a long career working across Central Australia. Some of her key achievements were:

- Acting as a qualified language interpreter
- Teaching language and culture classes, as well as cross-cultural communication at the Institute for Aboriginal Development
- Working as an Anangkere (traditional healer)
- Being a founding member of Irrkelantye Learning Centre; focusing on inter-generational learning for Arrernte people
- Painting with Irrkerlantye Arts for many years.
- Being a director of the Apmeraltye Ingkerreka project; developing protocols to protect Arrernte intellectual property in native plants
- An elder to the board of Akeyulerre; the Central Australian Aboriginal Healing centre
- Founding Elder, Board member and ambassador for Children's Ground
- Working on the "Fifty words that everyone living in Mparntwe should know" project

== Personal life and death ==
Margaret Kemarre Turner, a mother, grandmother and great-grandmother, died on 5 July 2023. Survivors included her grandchildren, Tiziana Turner, Janette Turner and Bevan Neil.

== Works ==
Bush Foods : Arrernte Foods of Central Australia: Nhenhe-areye Anwerne-arle Arlkweme, Alice Springs : IAD Press, 1996

Iwenhe Tyerrtye : What It Means to Be an Aboriginal Person, Alice Springs : IAD Press, 2010

== Awards ==
- 1997 Medal of the Order of Australia for her services to the Indigenous Community of Central Australia; particularly in relation to preserving language and culture and working as an interpreter.
