= Jeffrey Shaw (disambiguation) =

Jeffrey Shaw is a new media artist and researcher

Jeffrey Shaw may also refer to:

- Jeff Shaw (born 1966), baseball player
- Jeff Shaw (politician) (1949–2010), Australian lawyer, judge, and former Attorney General of New South Wales

== See also ==
- Geoffrey Shaw (disambiguation)
- Percy Shaw Jeffrey, English schoolmaster
