= Amburla =

Pastoral lease in the Northern Territory

Coordinates: 23.341°S 133.172°E

Location in Northern Territory

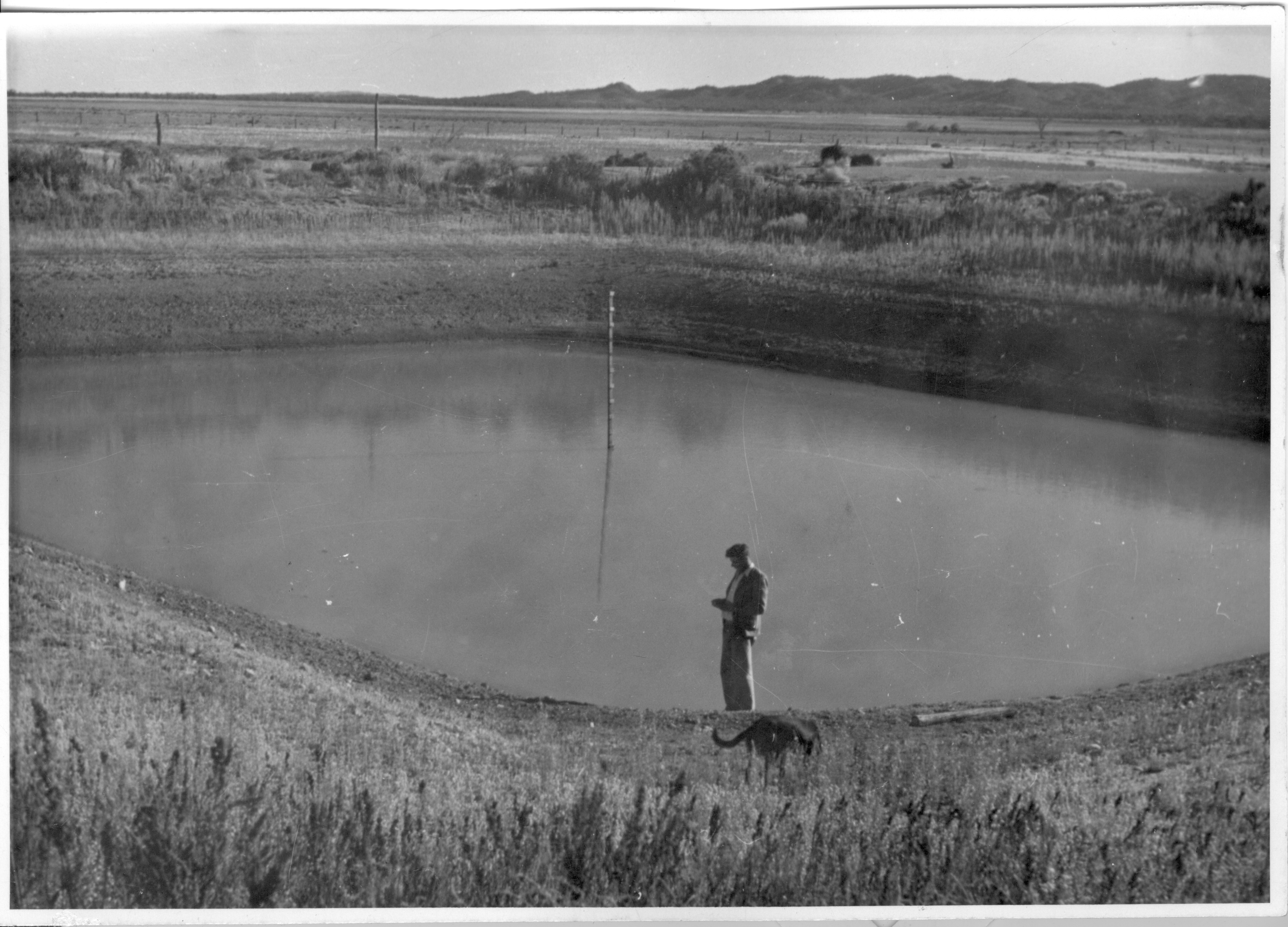
A limestone bore at Amburla Station, 1940s

Amburla Station is a pastoral lease that operates as a cattle station in the Northern Territory of Australia. The property is situated approximately 77 kilometres (48 mi) north of Hermannsburg and 83 kilometres (52 mi) west of Alice Springs.

Amburla occupies an area of 2,020 square kilometres (780 sq mi). The most productive area of the property are the Mitchell grass plains at the foot of Mount Hay and the relict alluvial plains of the floodout areas of Amburla, Charley and 16-Mile Creeks. The sandy red earth of the floodouts support mulga woodlands. The northern part of the property is composed of sandplains supporting spinifex.

Gary Dann, father of television actor Troy Dann, owned the property in 1989. The Danns sold the property in 2007 to Sterling Buntine. Buntine sold the station in 2011 for A$6 million to local cattleman Tony Davies.

== See also ==
- List of ranches and stations
