= Larapinta, Northern Territory =

Larapinta Alice Springs, Northern Territory
- Coordinates: 23°42′8″S 133°50′59″E
- Population: 2,267 (2016 census)
  - Density: 156.3/km^{2} (404.9/sq mi)
- Postcode(s): 0875
- Area: 14.5 km^{2} (5.6 sq mi)
- LGA(s): Town of Alice Springs
- Territory electorate(s): Namatjira
- Federal division(s): Lingiari
Mean max temp	Mean min temp	Annual rainfall
28.9 °C; 84 °F	13.3 °C; 56 °F	282.8 mm 11.1 in
Suburbs around Larapinta:
Larapinta
	Araluen

Larapinta is an outer suburb of the town of Alice Springs, in the Northern Territory, Australia. It is on the western side of Alice Springs, on the traditional Country of the Arrernte people.

The name of the suburb derives from the Arrernte name for the Finke River, Lhere Apirnte, meaning "salty creek".
