= Charles River (Alice Springs) =

Ephemeral stream in the Northern Territory, Australia

Coordinates: 23°41′29″S 133°53′04″E

The Charles River, which is often called Charles Creek (Eastern Arrernte: Anthelke Ulpaye), is an ephemeral stream in the southern Northern Territory. It is a tributary of the Todd River and, like the Todd River, its naming is associated with Charles Todd, a senior civil servant involved with the Overland Telegraph Line.

The Arrernte name for the river is Anthelke Ulpaye and this name is shared with a nearby Alice Springs Town Camp which is situated on its banks: this camp was once the site of the Little Flower Mission and is now commonly referred to as Charles Creek Camp. The Alice Springs Telegraph Station, which was once The Bungalow, is also situated close by.

The Charles River is 19 kilometres (12 mi) long and has a catchment area of 39 kilometres (24 mi) and it flows into Alice Springs from the MacDonnell Ranges to ANZAC Hill, where it joins with the Todd River. The area where the Charles and Todd Rivers meet is called Tyuretye (sometimes spelt Choritja) by the Arrernte people as the true central point of Alice Springs. Ted Strehlow noted in one of his major works, Songs of Central Australia, that Tjoritja as the "original name for Alice Springs."

== See also ==
- List of rivers of Australia § Northern Territory
