= Irlpme =

- Suburb
- Interactive map of Irlpme
- Coordinates: 23°39′11″S 133°51′44″E
- Country: Australia
- State: Northern Territory
- City: Alice Springs
- LGA: Town of Alice Springs

Government
  - Territory electorate: Braitling
  - Federal division: Lingiari

Population
  - Total: 0 (2016 census)
- Postcode: 0870
- Mean max temp: 28.9 °C (84.0 °F)
- Mean min temp: 13.3 °C (55.9 °F)
- Annual rainfall: 282.8 mm (11.13 in)

Irlpme is an outer suburb of the town of Alice Springs, in the Northern Territory, Australia. It is on the traditional Country of the Arrernte people.

The name of the suburb is taken from a native title estate group in the north of Alice Springs.
