= Connellan, Northern Territory =

Connellan Alice Springs, Northern Territory
- Coordinates: 23°46′31″S 133°54′32″E
- Population: 400 (partly shared) (2016 census) (Note: For the 2016 census, the "State Suburb of Connellan" included any people in the adjoining suburb of Kilgariff who lived on the south side of Colonel Rose Drive.)
- Postcode(s): 0870
- LGA(s): Town of Alice Springs
- Territory electorate(s): Braitling
- Federal division(s): Lingiari
Mean max temp	Mean min temp	Annual rainfall
28.9 °C; 84 °F	13.3 °C; 56 °F	282.8 mm 11.1 in
Suburbs around Connellan:
Kilgariff	Ross	Amoonguna
Hugh	Connellan	Hale
Hugh	Hale	Hale

Connellan is an outer suburb of the town of Alice Springs, in the Northern Territory of Australia.

Connellan is situated in the Arrernte traditional Aboriginal country.

The suburb is named after the aviator Edward Connellan. Connellan is also the location of the Alice Springs Airport.
