= Stuart, Northern Territory =

Stuart Alice Springs, Northern Territory
- Coordinates: 23°41′27″S 133°52′57″E
- Population: 466 (2016 census)
- Postcode(s): 0870
- LGA(s): Town of Alice Springs
- Territory electorate(s): Namatjira
- Federal division(s): Lingiari
| Mean max temp | Mean min temp | Annual rainfall |
| 28.9 °C; 84 °F | 13.3 °C; 56 °F | 282.8 mm 11.1 in |

Stuart is a suburb of the town of Alice Springs, in the Northern Territory, Australia. It is on the traditional Country of the Arrernte people.
