= List of mayors of Alice Springs =

Mayor of Alice Springs
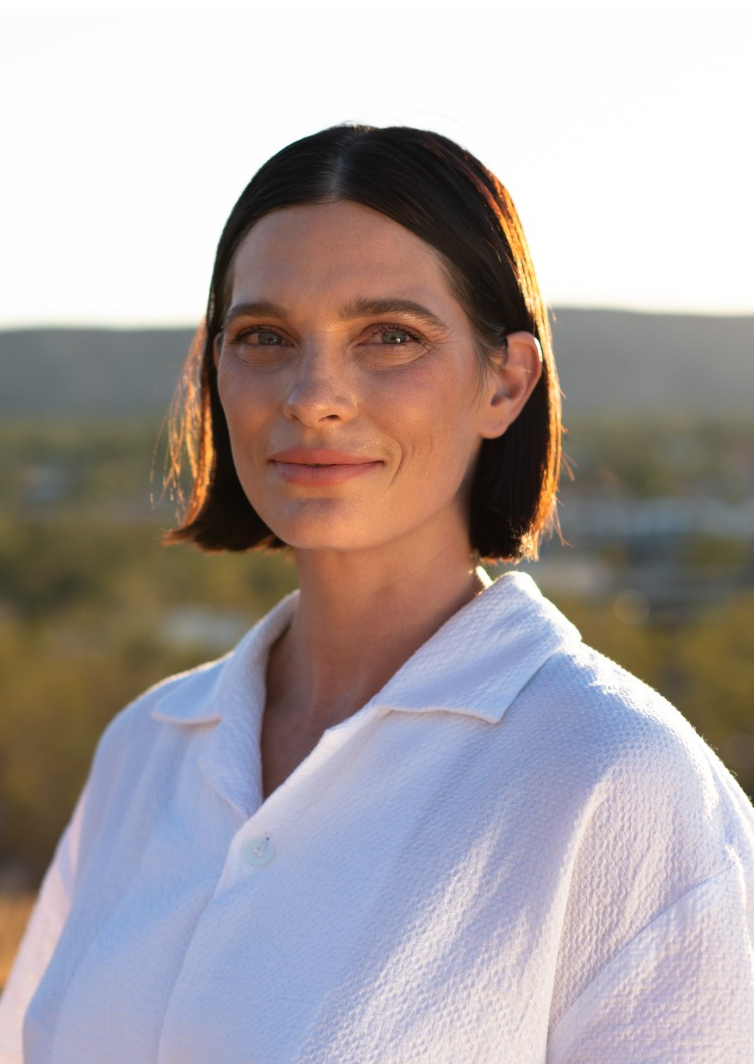
- Incumbent; Asta Hill since 23 August 2025
- Style: His/Her Worship
- Member of: Alice Springs Town Council
- Seat: Alice Springs
- Term length: 4 years No restriction on renewal
- Precursor: Damien Ryan
- Formation: 1 July 1971
- First holder: Jock Nelson
- Website: https://alicesprings.nt.gov.au/

This is a list of mayors of Alice Springs Town Council, a local government area in the Northern Territory, Australia. The mayor is an elected member of the council, who acts as a ceremonial figurehead at official functions, and carries the authority of council between meetings.

The longest serving Mayor of Alice Springs was Damien Ryan, who served from March 2008 until his resignation in September 2021 (13.5 years approximately).

The current mayor is Asta Hill.

== Mayors ==
=== 1971−present ===
No.	Portrait	Mayor	Party	Term start	Term end
1		Jock Nelson	Ind. Labor	1 July 1971	8 December 1973
2		Brian Martin	Independent	9 December 1973	12 April 1976
3		Tony Greatorex	Ind. CLP	30 May 1976	28 May 1977
4		George Smith	Independent	29 May 1977	11 February 1983
5		Leslie Oldfield	Independent	24 April 1983	30 May 1992
6		Andy McNeill	Independent	31 May 1992	27 May 2000
7		Fran Kilgariff	Ind. CLP	28 May 2000	29 March 2008
8		Damien Ryan	Independent Country Liberal	30 March 2008	14 September 2021
9		Matt Paterson	Independent	15 September 2021	23 August 2025
10		Asta Hill	Greens	23 August 2025	incumbent
