= Charlie Sadadeen =

Australian businesspeople (1870 – 1933)

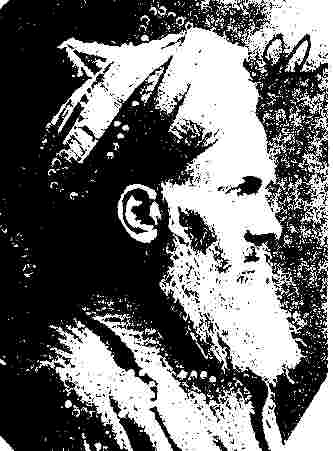
- Afghan cameleer, Charlie Sadadeen

Personal details
- Born: Saleh Sadadene; 1870 Baloochistan
- Died: 19 July 1933 (aged 62–63) Alice Springs, Northern Territory, Australia
- Spouse: Annie Markham
- Occupation: Cameleer

Saleh "Charlie" Sadadeen, sometimes spelt Sadadene, (c.1870 – 19 July 1933) was an Afghan cameleer and bushman who lived in Alice Springs in the Northern Territory of Australia.

== Cameleer ==
Sadadeen was born in Baloochistan around 1870. By 1880 he was working as a camel man for Lord Roberts on the march from Kabul to Kandahar as a part of the British Army. He would frequently repeat stories from this time later in his life and often wear treasured old pieces of the uniform.

It is thought he immigrated to Australia after obtaining work near Oodnadatta in South Australia at the time the railway line was completed in 1890. He was working with camel teams by 1902 for the Wallis Brothers, carting goods from Oodnadatta to Stuart, now Alice Springs and to Arltunga.

By 1914 he managed a strong of 120–130 camels, half belonging to him, the other half to Wallis and Co. Legendary bushman Walter Smith worked for Sadadeen for about 15 years. He described him as a hard man but deeply respected his skills and practices. Smith suffered from migraines and describes Sadadeen leaving him under a tree with a billy of water, expecting him to catch up to the camel train upon recovery.

In 1921 he purchased a block of land in Alice Springs, on Todd Street, where he established a flowers and vegetable garden (sometimes obtaining opium poppies) and planted date trees; this block was immediately south of Ah Hong's two blocks. He was the first Afghan Cameleer to do so. As a devout Muslim, he was a leader for the Afghan community and also built a small wooden mosque on this land and obtained licenses to slaughter stock for the Islamic community; ensuring they had access to halal meat. He also kept camels and grew vegetables at a place called Sadadeen Swamp about 30 kilometres south of Alice Springs.

Sadadeen married Annie Markham, but the relationship ended. They had no children.

Sadadeen died in Alice Springs in 1933. He is buried in the 'Mahommedan' section of the Alice Springs Memorial Cemetery with his grave facing mecca.

== Legacy ==
The site of Sadadeen's market garden is now the location of Alice Springs Town Council and two date palms planted in this garden can still be seen. There is a monument and park dedicated to Sadadeen and his fellow cameleers within this block and it was named Nishan-e-Afghan (Centre of Afghans) Park in 2000.

The Alice Springs suburb of Sadadeen is named after him, as is Sadadeen Primary School. Sadadeen Range on the east of Alice Springs also takes his name, which was where he kept his camels.
