= Tangentyere Council =

Australian service delivery agency in Alice Springs

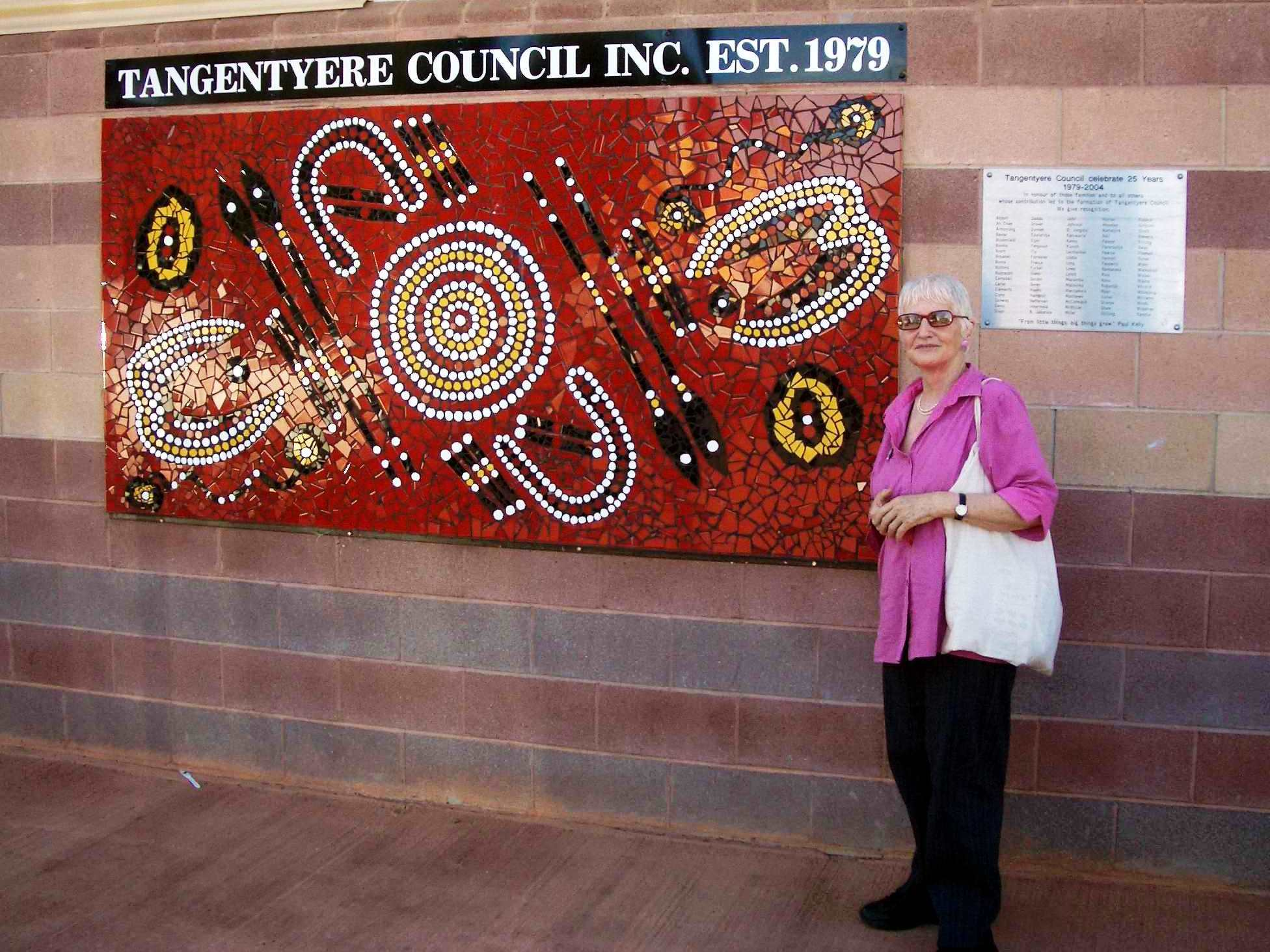
Tangentyere Council sign

Tangentyere Council, formerly known as Tunkatjira, is a major service delivery agency in Alice Springs which offers a wide range of services and programs for Aboriginal people in Central Australia. First established in the 1970s, it has grown beyond its original purpose, which was to support and provide tenure, services and essential services for Alice Springs Town Camps and their residents, to incorporate family, community and social services, as well as running a number of not-for-profit enterprises.

== History ==
Town camps, initially established on the fringe of Alice Springs, Northern Territory, have long being a feature of the town. They are the direct result of the dispossession of Aboriginal people from their traditional lands, and there is a strong history of opposition to them. Despite this opposition the camps survived, avoiding measures to remove or assimilate them, and from the 1970s have campaigned to actively assert their rights, demanding land tenure, shelter, essential services and self-determination. In order to do this the council was established in 1974 as Tunkatjira, and it was officially recognised in 1977 before finally being incorporated as Tangentyere Council on 6 February 1979. It is unknown why the spelling was changed at this time. The organisation soon developed to incorporate the provision of family, community and social services.

Tangentyere is a derivative of tunkatjira an Arrernte word meaning "all speaking together", and it aimed to unite Aboriginal people in Central Australia from all of the language and people groups, including Warlpiri, Anmatyerre, Kaytetye, Pitjantjatjara, Luritja, Alyawarre and Pintupi.

== Description ==
Despite significant steps forward is housing services to town camps, from humpies and bits of tin to houses, the living standards of their residents remain unacceptably low, and it is partially for this reason that Tangentyere Council now offers a wide range of social services and runs not-for-profit enterprises. The council employs more than 200 staff, of whom approximately 70% are Aboriginal.

=== Services ===
- Housing
  - Central Australia Affordable Housing Company
  - Municipal and Essential Services
- Social Services
  - Social Justice; Aboriginal Community Patrols & Community Safety
  - Emergency Relief and ID Card Service
  - Research Hub
  - Aged and Community Services
  - Chronic Disease Coordination
- Family and Youth Services
  - Safe families
  - Early Childhood Development Services
  - Family Wellbeing
  - Tangentyere Youth Activity Service
  - Town Camp Centres
  - Drum Atweme
  - Life Skills Program
  - Land and Learning Program
- CDEP and Employment Services
- Finance
- Corporate Services

=== Enterprises ===
The council's not-for-profit enterprises include:

- Yarrenyty Arltere Artists
- Tangentyere Artists
- Tangentyere Constructions
- Tangentyere Design
- Alice Springs Employment and Training Services
- Indigenous Landscapes

== See also ==
- Vincent Lingiari Art Award
