= Gillen, Northern Territory =

Gillen
- Suburb
- Interactive map of Gillen
- Coordinates: 23°42′37″S 133°51′50″E
- Country: Australia
- State: Northern Territory
- City: Alice Springs
- LGA: Town of Alice Springs

Government
  - Territory electorate: Araluen
  - Federal division: Lingiari

Area
  - Total: 2.5 km^{2} (0.97 sq mi)

Population
  - Total: 4,278 (2016 census)
  - Density: 1,710/km^{2} (4,430/sq mi)
- Postcode: 0870
- Mean max temp: 28.9 °C (84.0 °F)
- Mean min temp: 13.3 °C (55.9 °F)
- Annual rainfall: 282.8 mm (11.13 in)

Gillen is a suburb of the town of Alice Springs in the Northern Territory, Australia. It is on the traditional Country of the Arrernte people.

The suburb is named after FJ Gillen and Mt Gillen in the MacDonnell Ranges and ultimately derived from the anthropologist Francis James Gillen, who was the telegraphist and station master at Alice Springs in 1892.

The suburb was named in April 2007, with the boundaries approved on 8 March 2007.

The Central Australian Aviation Museum is located within the suburb.
