= Asta Hill =

Incumbent mayor of Alice Springs

Her Worship Asta Hill
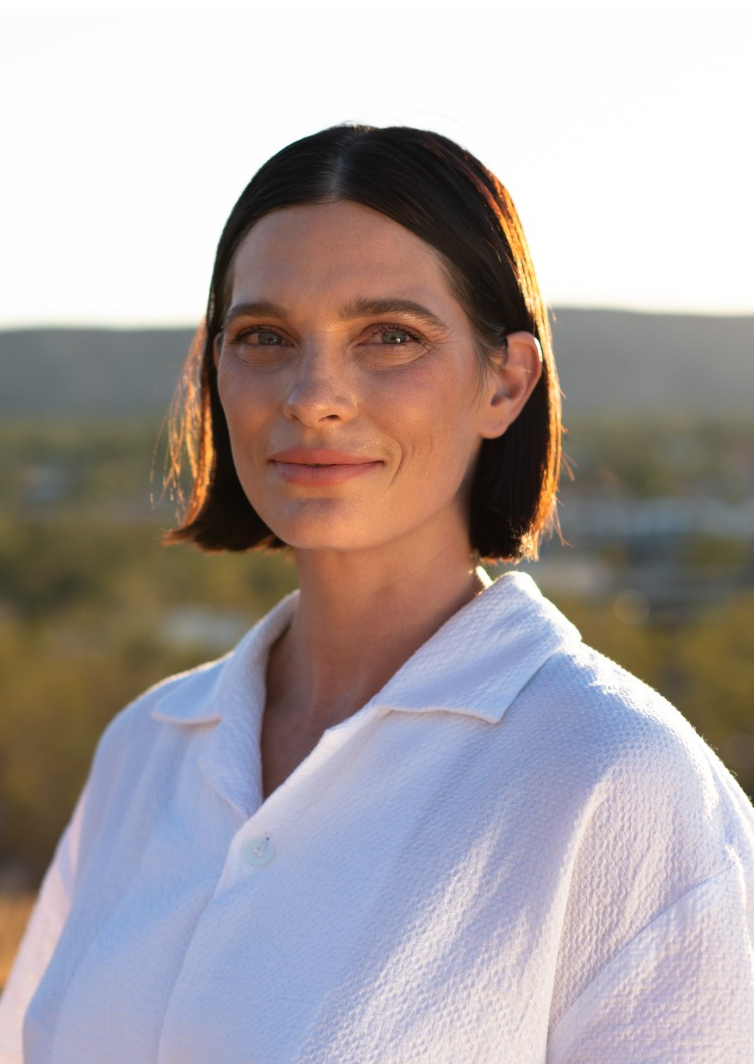
- Hill in 2024

10th Mayor of Alice Springs
- Incumbent
- Assumed office 23 August 2025
- Preceded by: Matt Paterson

Personal details
- Party: Greens
- Children: 2
- Education: University of Adelaide
- Profession: Lawyer

Asta Hill (born 1987)) is an Australian politician who has served as the 10th mayor of Alice Springs since 2025. At the 2025 Alice Springs Town Council election, she won with 50.3% of the two-party-preferred vote vote, succeeding independent Matt Paterson. She is member of the Northern Territory Greens, and she is the first Greens-endorsed candidate to hold this position.

Hill also unsuccessfully contested the 2024 Northern Territory general election as the party's candidate for Braitling, receiving 46.1% of the 2CP vote.

== Political career ==
In the 2024 NT general election, she was announced as the Greens candidate for Braitling, the division encompassing Alice Springs. She was unsuccessful, however her candidacy received a 30% swing towards the Greens compared to the 2020 election.

In 2025, she ran for the position of mayor of Alice Springs, as well as a councillor. In this election, she ran against a Country Liberal Party candidate, Lisa-Marie Burgoyne, and it was predicted that it would be a close race between the two. However, Hill defeated an independent candidate, Eli Melky, with 50.3% of the two-candidate-preferred vote.

Hill ran on a platform of community safety and campaigned on "changing the story" of Alice Springs, following many years of media coverage focused on crime. That included her idea of supporting residents and providing family activities and entertainment.
