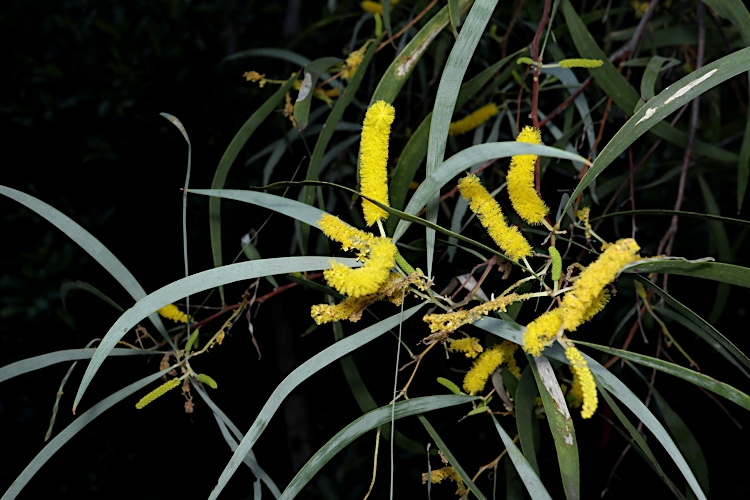
- In Mount Annan Botanic Garden

Conservation status
- Vulnerable (TPWCA)

- Vulnerable (EPBC Act)

Scientific classification
- Kingdom: Plantae
- Clade: Embryophytes
- Clade: Tracheophytes
- Clade: Spermatophytes
- Clade: Angiosperms
- Clade: Eudicots
- Clade: Rosids
- Order: Fabales
- Family: Fabaceae
- Subfamily: Caesalpinioideae
- Clade: Mimosoid clade
- Genus: Acacia
- Species: A. undoolyana

Binomial name
- Acacia undoolyana G.J.Leach
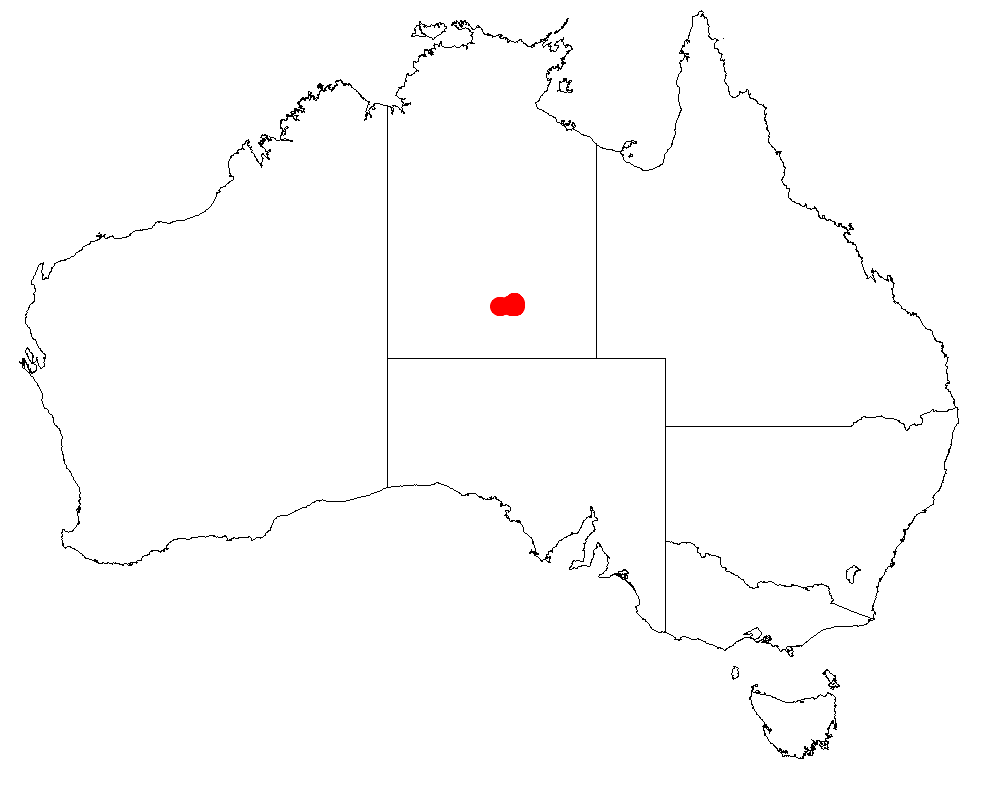
- Occurrence data from AVH

= Acacia undoolyana =

Species of legume

Acacia undoolyana (common names sickle-leaf wattle, Undoolya wattle) is a species of wattle native to central Australia.

== Description ==
Acacia undoolyana is a shrub or small tree growing up to 15 m high and has persistent fissured bark. Both stems and phyllodes have a covering of minute flattened hairs, when young. The phyllodes are flat, linear to narrowly elliptic, and silvery when young but later a grey-green. They are sickle-shaped, are 120–220 mm long by 5–15 mm wide, and have a marginal basal gland and a prominent apical gland. They have multiple parallel nerves of which up to three are more prominent. The inflorescence is a yellow cylindrical spike on a hairy peduncle 3–6 mm long. The pods are linear and 50–110 mm long by 2–3 mm wide, and the seeds have a white aril.

It flowers from June to September and fruits from August to December.

== Distribution ==
It is found in the MacDonnell Ranges Bioregion of Central Australia. The main population is on Undoolya station.

== Habitat ==
It is generally found on steep south facing slopes on skeletal soils.

== Conservation status ==
It is listed as "vulnerable" under both Commonwealth and Territory legislation. The major threat to its survival is frequent bushfires.
