= Shirleen Campbell =

Indigenous Australian activist against family and domestic violence

Shirleen Campbell (born 1981) is a Warlpiri, Anmatyerre, Luritja and Arrernte family and domestic violence activist from Mparntwe in the Northern Territory of Australia.

Campbell was born in 1981 and is a third-generation resident of Lhenpe Artnwe. She lost her mother, aunt, and a close friend to domestic violence.

She is the co-ordinator of the Tangentyere Women's Family Safety Group a family and anti-domestic violence organisation. She was part of a contingent that travelled to Parliament House in Canberra in 2018, to hold a 'sit-in, or sorry ceremony' in memory of the women who have been killed or injured due to family violence. She also directed the three-part documentary Not Just Numbers.

In 2021, Campbell was appointed on the 13-member Aboriginal and Torres Strait Islander Advisory Council supporting the development of a National Plan to end family, domestic and sexual violence in Australia.

== Awards ==
- Campbell the Northern Territory Local Hero in 2020 as part of the Australian of the Year awards.
- Not Just Numbers also won Best Broadcast Documentary at the Capricornia Film awards in 2021.
