= Amoonguna =

- Town
- Coordinates: 23°46′06″S 133°53′09″E
- Country: Australia
- State: Northern Territory
- LGA: MacDonnell Region
- Location: 15 km (9.3 mi) from Alice Springs
- Established: 1960 (community); 4 April 2007 (locality)

Government
  - Territory electorate: Namatjira
  - Federal division: Lingiari

Population
  - Total: 224 (2021 census)
- Postcode: 0872

Amoonguna, or Imengkwerne, is an Aboriginal community in Rodinga Ward of the MacDonnell Regional Council in the Northern Territory of Australia, 21 km (13 mi) southeast of Alice Springs.

== Name ==
Amoonguna is believed to mean "treeless plain" in an Aboriginal language.

== Services ==
Amoonguna's access and internal roads are all sealed, but the community can be cut off by flooding of the Todd River during heavy rain.

All general municipal services are provided by the MacDonnell Regional Council, including internal road maintenance, animal control, waste collection, as well as development and maintenance of services such as parks, sports facilities, landfills and firebreaks. The council also provides homecare, night patrol service and a community store.

The community also contains a health clinic and primary school, operated independently of the council.

Amoonguna is connected to the Alice Springs electricity network and water supply.

== Demographics ==
In the 2021 census, Aboriginal Australians and Torres Strait Islanders were 96.9% of the population.

27.5% only spoke English at home; 34.1% spoke Eastern Arrernte, 17% spoke an unspecified variety of Arrernte, 4.8% spoke Warlpiri, 2.6% spoke an unspecified Aboriginal language and 1.3% spoke Western Arrernte.

86.8% of the population were not in the labour force.

== In popular culture ==
The community features in the 2022 SBS Television police drama miniseries, True Colours.
