= Undoolya, Northern Territory =

Undoolya
- Suburb
- Interactive map of Undoolya
- Coordinates: 23°41′26″S 133°54′59″E
- Country: Australia
- State: Northern Territory
- City: Alice Springs
- LGA: Town of Alice Springs

Government
  - Territory electorate: Braitling
  - Federal division: Lingiari

Population
  - Total: 0 (2016 census)
- Postcode: 0870
- Mean max temp: 28.9 °C (84.0 °F)
- Mean min temp: 13.3 °C (55.9 °F)
- Annual rainfall: 282.8 mm (11.13 in)

Undoolya is an outer suburb of the town of Alice Springs, in the Northern Territory, Australia. It is on the traditional Country of the Arrernte people.

The name of the suburb derives from the local Arrernte name ntulye, meaning shade or shadow.
