= Arumbera =

- Suburb
- Coordinates: 23°46′48″S 133°48′36″E
- Country: Australia
- State: Northern Territory
- City: Alice Springs
- LGA: Town of Alice Springs
- Established: 4 April 2007

Government
  - Territory electorate: Braitling
  - Federal division: Lingiari

Population
  - Total: 257 (2021 census)
- Time zone: UTC+9:30 (ACST)
- Postcode: 0870
- Mean max temp: 28.9 °C (84.0 °F)
- Mean min temp: 13.3 °C (55.9 °F)
- Annual rainfall: 282.8 mm (11.13 in)

Arumbera is an outer suburb of the town of Alice Springs, in the Northern Territory, Australia. It is on the traditional Country of the Arrernte people.

Arumbera, in the Town of Alice Springs, is situated in the Arrernte traditional Indigenous Australians country.

== Demographics ==
As of the 2021 Australian census, 257 people resided in Arumbera, down from 268 in the 2016 census. The median age of persons in Arumbera was 38 years. There were fewer males than females, with 45.8% of the population male and 54.2% female. The average household size was 2.9 people per household.
