= The Gap, Northern Territory =

The Gap
- Suburb
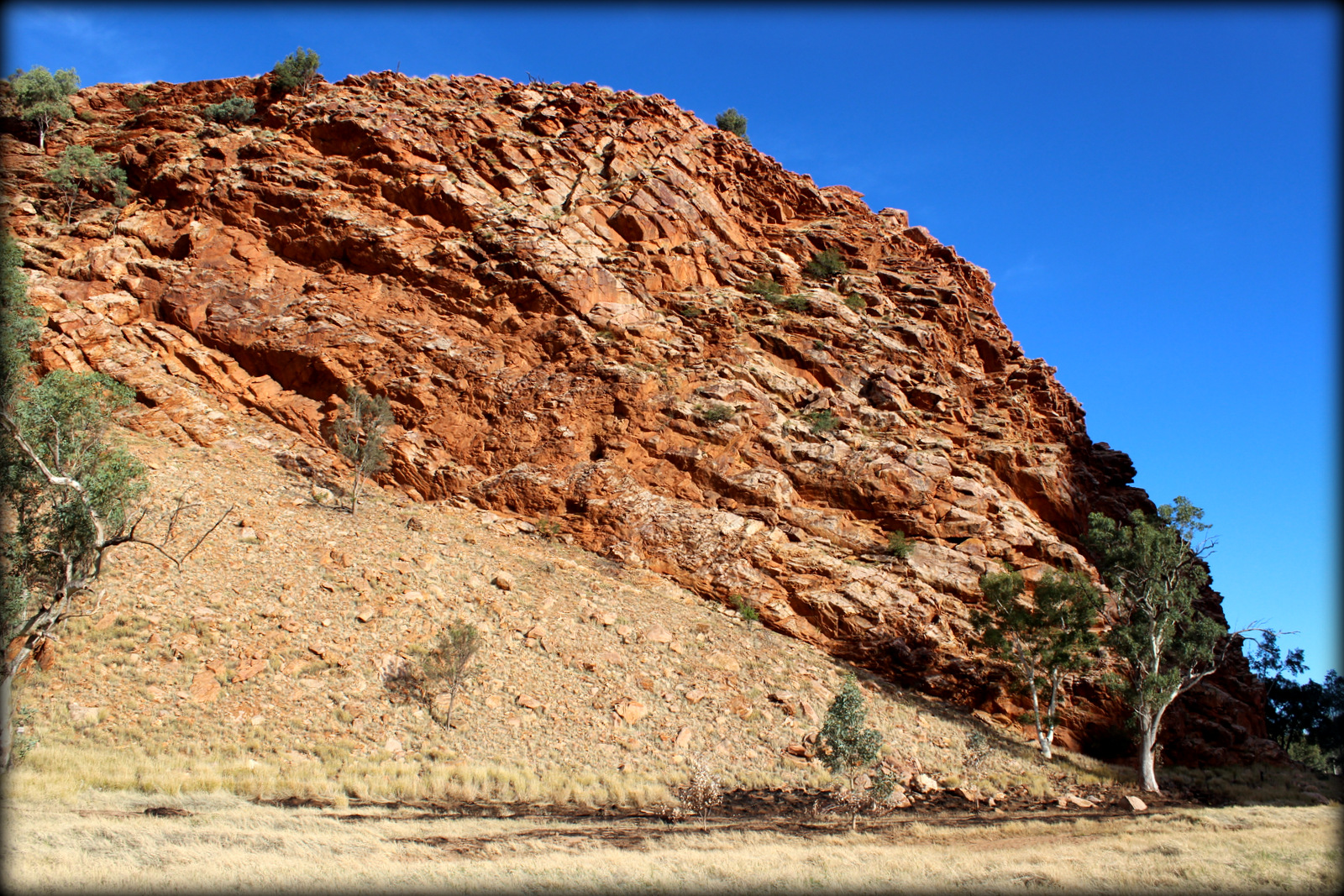
- Rock formation at the Gap

- Interactive map of The Gap
- Coordinates: 23°42′49″S 133°52′27″E
- Country: Australia
- State: Northern Territory
- City: Alice Springs
- LGA: Town of Alice Springs

Government
  - Territory electorate: Araluen
  - Federal division: Lingiari

Population
  - Total: 1,709 (2016 census)
- Postcode: 0870
- Mean max temp: 28.9 °C (84.0 °F)
- Mean min temp: 13.3 °C (55.9 °F)
- Annual rainfall: 282.8 mm (11.13 in)

The Gap is a suburb of the town of Alice Springs, in the Northern Territory, Australia. It is located at the Heavitree Gap. It is on the traditional Country of the Arrernte people.
