= Ciccone, Northern Territory =

Ciccone Alice Springs, Northern Territory
- Coordinates: 23°41′32″S 133°52′11″E
- Population: 255 (2016 census)
  - Density: 130/km^{2} (330/sq mi)
- Postcode(s): 0870
- Area: 2 km^{2} (0.8 sq mi)
- LGA(s): Town of Alice Springs
- Territory electorate(s): Braitling
- Federal division(s): Lingiari
Mean max temp	Mean min temp	Annual rainfall
28.9 °C; 84 °F	13.3 °C; 56 °F	282.8 mm 11.1 in

Ciccone is an industrial suburb of Alice Springs with a population of around 255 (2016). It is on the traditional Country of the Arrernte people.

Ciccone is located right next to Stuart Highway. There are a small number of houses on the north-western side of Ciccone, but the area is mostly industrial.

The suburb is named after Pasquale "Patsy" Ciccone and his wife, Antonia. The Ciccones were early Italian pioneers in Central Australia, who settled in Alice Springs in the 1920s and 1930s and established several mines in the area, mining gold and other metals.
