= Flynn, Northern Territory =

Flynn Alice Springs, Northern Territory
- Coordinates: 23°42′45″S 133°51′9″E
- Population: 103 (2016 census)
- Postcode(s): 0870
- LGA(s): Town of Alice Springs
- Territory electorate(s): Braitling
- Federal division(s): Lingiari
Mean max temp	Mean min temp	Annual rainfall
28.9 °C; 84 °F	13.3 °C; 56 °F	282.8 mm 11.1 in

Flynn is an outer suburb of the town of Alice Springs, in the Northern Territory, Australia. It is on the traditional Country of the Arrernte people.

The suburb is named after the Very Reverend John Flynn, the founder of the Royal Flying Doctor Service of Australia and the place where his grave is located.
