= Sadadeen, Northern Territory =

Sadadeen Alice Springs, Northern Territory
- Coordinates: 23°42′3″S 133°53′59″E
- Population: 2,123 (2016 census)
- Postcode(s): 0870
- LGA(s): Town of Alice Springs
- Territory electorate(s): Araluen
- Federal division(s): Lingiari
Mean max temp	Mean min temp	Annual rainfall
28.9 °C; 84 °F	13.3 °C; 56 °F	282.8 mm 11.1 in

Sadadeen is a suburb of the town of Alice Springs, in the Northern Territory, Australia. It is on the traditional Country of the Arrernte people.

It is named after Afghan cameleer Charlie Sadadeen.
