= Ilparpa =

- Suburb
- Interactive map of Ilparpa
- Coordinates: 23°45′20″S 133°49′5″E
- Country: Australia
- State: Northern Territory
- City: Alice Springs
- LGA: Town of Alice Springs

Government
  - Territory electorate: Braitling
  - Federal division: Lingiari

Population
  - Total: 470 (2016 census)
- Postcode: 0870
- Mean max temp: 28.9 °C (84.0 °F)
- Mean min temp: 13.3 °C (55.9 °F)
- Annual rainfall: 282.8 mm (11.13 in)

Ilparpa is an outer suburb of the town of Alice Springs, in the Northern Territory, Australia. It is on the traditional Country of the Arrernte people.
