= NT Greens =

- Leader: None
- Headquarters: PO Box 421; Nightcliff NT 0814
- Ideology: Green politics Progressivism
- Political position: Left-wing
- National affiliation: Australian Greens
- Colours: Green
- Legislative Assembly: 0 / 25
- Darwin City Council: 0 / 13
- Barkly Regional Council: 1 / 13
- Alice Springs Town Council: 1 / 8
- Mayors in the Northern Territory: 1 / 18

Website
- greens.org.au/nt

The NT Greens are a green party in the Northern Territory, a member of the federation of the Australian Greens party. The party gained its first seat in the Northern Territory Legislative Assembly, winning the seat of Nightcliff in 2024, however the party's MLA, Kat McNamara, resigned in February 2026.

Green candidates first ran in the Northern Territory at the 1990 federal election and the 1990 Northern Territory election. The 1996 federal election saw the first NT Greens candidates contest a federal election under an official party banner.

The NT Greens saw its first electoral victory in April 2008, when candidate Greg Jarvis was elected as one of three members for Darwin City Council's Chan Ward, defeating incumbent alderman Christine Tilley. Jarvis died on 1 February 2010 and the resultant by-election was won by Greens candidate Robin Knox. In the 2012 local government elections the party's representation on Council was doubled in Darwin with the re-election of Robin Knox in Chan Ward and election of Simon Niblock in Lyons Ward. In Alice Springs, Jade Kudrenko was the first Green Councillor, elected in 2012.

At the 2008 Northern Territory election, the Greens ran in six of the 25 seats in the unicameral parliament, averaging around 16 percent. The highest vote was in Nightcliff at 23.7 percent. The NT Greens increased their vote in both Houses to a record 13 percent at the 2010 federal election.

At the 2020 Northern Territory election, the party once again contested ten of the twenty-five Assembly seats and achieved a record result with 4.46% of the primary vote. They were closest to a place in a two-party preferred contest in Nightcliff, where candidate Billee McGinley was within 14 votes of beating the Country Liberal Party into second place at the final exclusion.

At the 2021 local government elections, the party endorsed candidates in the elections for Alice Springs Town Council, Barkly Regional Council, and City of Darwin. The Greens candidates in Darwin and the Barkly were successful.

Asta Hill was elected as mayor of Alice Springs in August 2025.

== Election results ==
The NT Greens have had very little electoral success when compared to other branches of the Greens. The party's electoral success in the Northern Territory is mostly limited to local government.

The NT Greens was the last branch of the Greens to gain parliamentary representation. The Greens have never had any representatives from the Northern Territory in the Federal Parliament, nor had they had any representatives in the Northern Territory Legislative Assembly until the 2024 Northern Territory general election.

At territory elections, the Northern Territory consistently has the lowest Greens vote of any state or territory, peaking at 8.1%. However, the Greens only field candidates in select seats (mostly in the Northern Territory's three largest cities: Darwin, Palmerston and Alice Springs), being the only Greens branch in Australia to not run in every seat of 2024. At the 2020 general election, the party fielded candidates in 10 of the 25 electoral divisions of the Legislative Assembly: Araluen, Braitling, Casuarina, Daly, Fannie Bay, Goyder, Johnston, Namatjira, Nightcliff and Electoral division of Port Darwin. Of these, the party's highest vote was in Nightcliff (where they almost finished second), while Daly, Goyder and Namatjira were the only seats outside Darwin or Alice Springs that the party contested.

Prior to the 2024 election, the only time the Greens had finished second in any seat at a Northern Territory general election was in 2008, when the Greens finished second in the Alice Springs-based seat of Braitling, where the party finished second to the CLP; however, the Greens won just 29.7% of the two-candidate-preferred vote against the CLP's 70.3%. At the 2024 election they won the division of Nightcliff to earn their first seat in the Legislative Assembly, and finished close seconds to the CLP in both Fannie Bay and Braitling.

On the federal level, the Greens field candidates in both of the Northern Territory's House of Representatives electorates: the metropolitan seat of Solomon and the remote seat of Lingiari, with the party performing better in Solomon than in Lingiari. However, as the two territories only elect two senators each, the Greens have never had a representative in the Senate from either of the two territories.

=== Local government ===
The NT Greens currently have two members elected to local government in the Northern Territory: Morgan Rickard, Alderman for Chan Ward in City of Darwin, and Dianne Stokes, elected in Patta Ward, Barkly Regional Council. Dianne Stokes is currently the Deputy Mayor of Barkly Regional Council.

The NT Greens have previously had three Aldermen on City of Darwin: Greg Jarvis (2008–10), Robin Knox (2010–21), and Simon Niblock (2012–21). The NT Greens also elected a Councillor, Jade Kudrenko, to Alice Springs Town Council in 2012.

Asta Hill has served as mayor of Alice Springs since 2025.

=== Northern Territory Legislative Assembly ===
Election	Votes	%	Seats	Position
1990	1,981	3.0	0 / 25	Not in chamber
1994	552	0.8	0 / 25	Not in chamber
1997	420	0.6	0 / 25	Not in chamber
2001	—N/a	—N/a	0 / 25	Did not contest
2005	3,594	4.17	0 / 25	Not in chamber
2008	3,442	4.3	0 / 25	Not in chamber
2012	3,039	3.3	0 / 25	Not in chamber
2016	2,817	2.9	0 / 25	Not in chamber
2020	4,453	4.46	0 / 25	Not in chamber
2024	8,229	8.13	1 / 25	Crossbench

=== Federal Elections ===
Election	NT House seats				NT Senate seats			
Election	Votes	%	Seats	+/–	Votes	%	Seats	+/–
2001	3,665	4.0	0 / 2		3,978	4.3	0 / 2	
2004	5,646	6.2	0 / 2	0	7,016	7.6	0 / 2	0
2007	7,903	8.1	0 / 2	0	8,870	8.8	0 / 2	0
2010	12,175	13.0	0 / 2	0	13,105	13.6	0 / 2	0
2013	7,841	7.9	0 / 2	0	8,974	8.7	0 / 2	0
2016	8,858	9.1	0 / 2	0	11,003	10.8	0 / 2	0
2019	10,512	10.2	0 / 2	0	10,752	10.2	0 / 2	0

== Elected representatives ==
Northern Territory Legislative Assembly

- Kat McNamara — Nightcliff (2024–2026)

Local government

- Asta Hill — Alice Springs Mayor (2025–current)
- Aia Newport — Alice Springs Undivided Councillor (2025–current)
- Dianne Stokes — Barkly Patta Ward Councillor (2021–2024; 2024–current)

Former councillors

- Morgan Rickard — Darwin Chan Ward Councillor (2021–2024)
- Simon Niblock — Darwin Councillor (2012–2021)
- Robin Knox — Darwin Councillor (2010–2021)
- Jade Kudrenko — Alice Springs Councillor (2012–2017)
- Greg Jarvis — Darwin Councillor (2008–2010)
