= Todd River =

Ephemeral river in the Northern Territory, Australia

Coordinates: 23.75°S 133.8772°E

Todd River (Lhere Mparntwe)
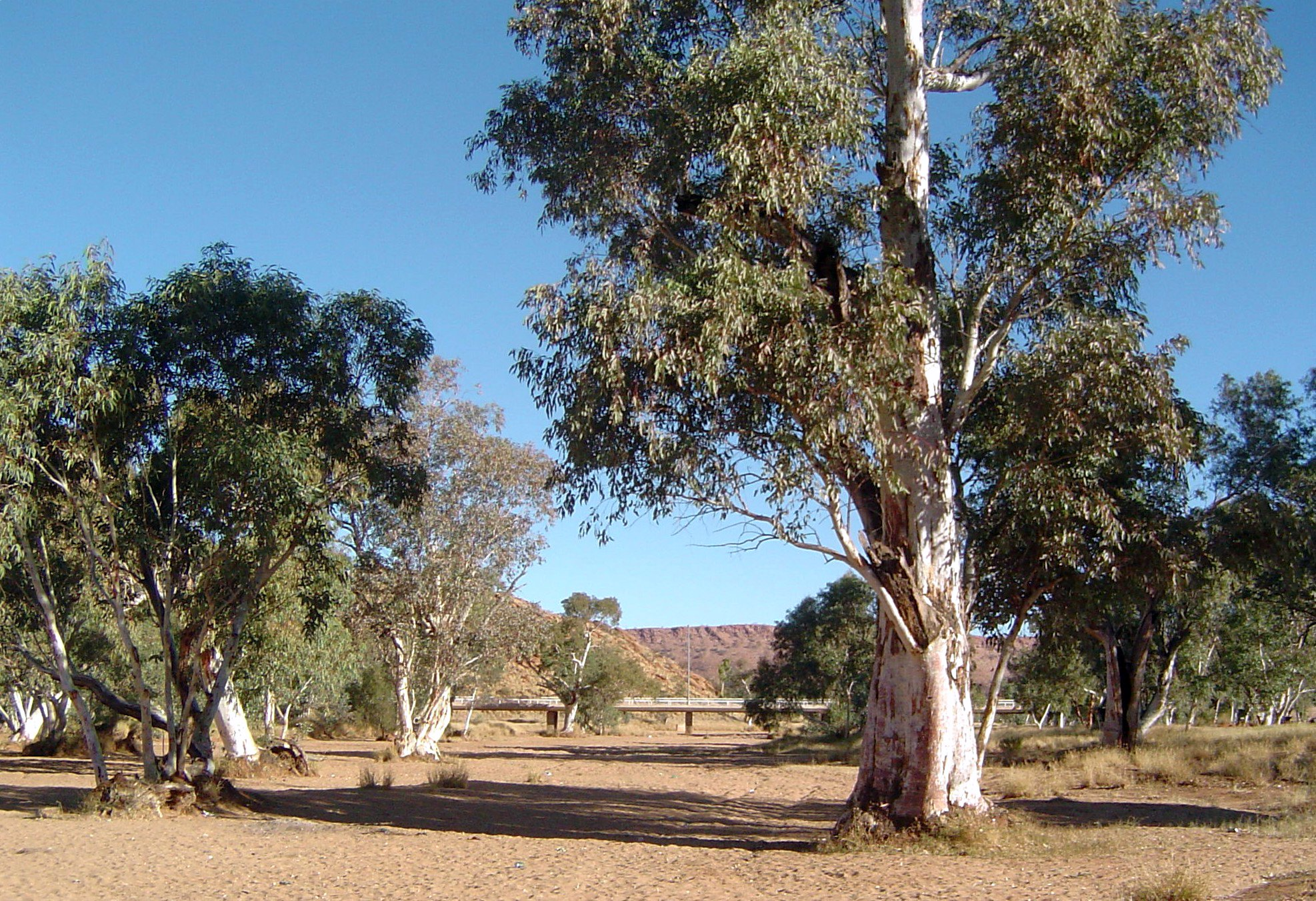
- The dry riverbed of the Todd River

Location
- Country: Australia

Physical characteristics
- Source
  - location: MacDonnell Ranges
- Basin size: 445 km^{2} (172 sq mi)

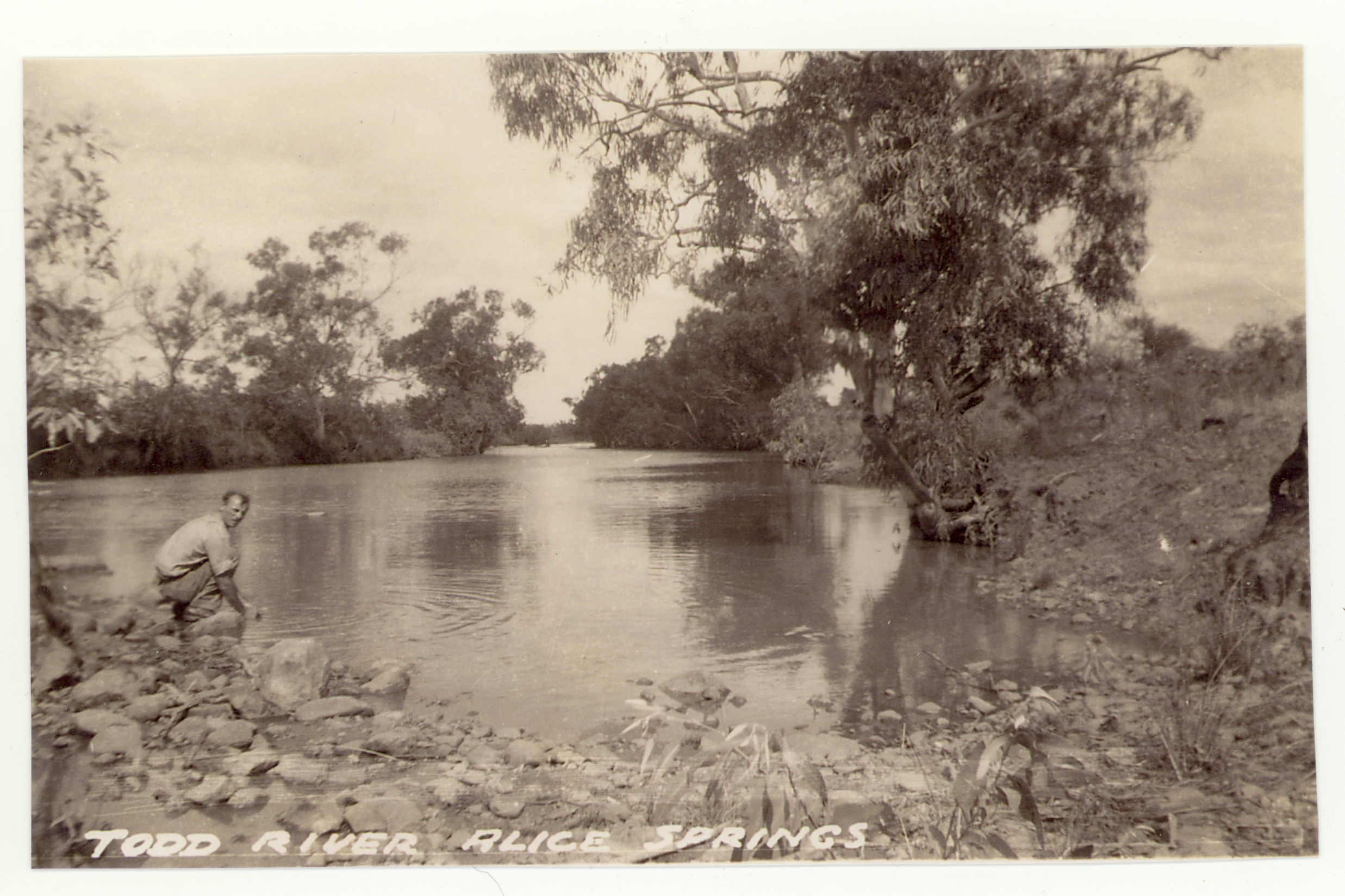
The flowing Todd River (Llhere Mparntwe) in 1946

The Todd River (Arrernte: Lhere Mparntwe / Lhere Imatukua / Artepe Ulpaye) is an ephemeral river in the southern Northern Territory, central Australia. The origins of the Todd River are in the MacDonnell Ranges, where it flows past the Alice Springs Telegraph Station and then almost through the centre of Alice Springs (Mparntwe). It then flows out of Alice Springs through Heavitree Gap, to the south, and through to the western part of the Simpson Desert, as it becomes a tributary of the Hale River, and eventually flowing into Lake Eyre in South Australia.

The Arrernte people know this river as Lhere Mparntwe (Eastern Arrernte pronunciation: [l̪ərə ᵐbaⁿɖʷə]) where it runs through Alice Springs and Lhere Imatukua (Eastern Arrernte pronunciation: [l̪ərə imatukua]) as a whole. These names were recorded by TGH Strehlow in "Songs of Central Australia".

The Todd River's English name, and that of its tributary, the Charles River, were given by surveyor W. W. Mills, after Charles Todd, then South Australian Superintendent of Telegraphs and Postmaster General of South Australia, who was largely responsible for the construction of the Overland Telegraph Line.

The Todd is in a very arid part of Australia and has zero to very low flow during 95% of the year.

== Significance to Alice Springs ==
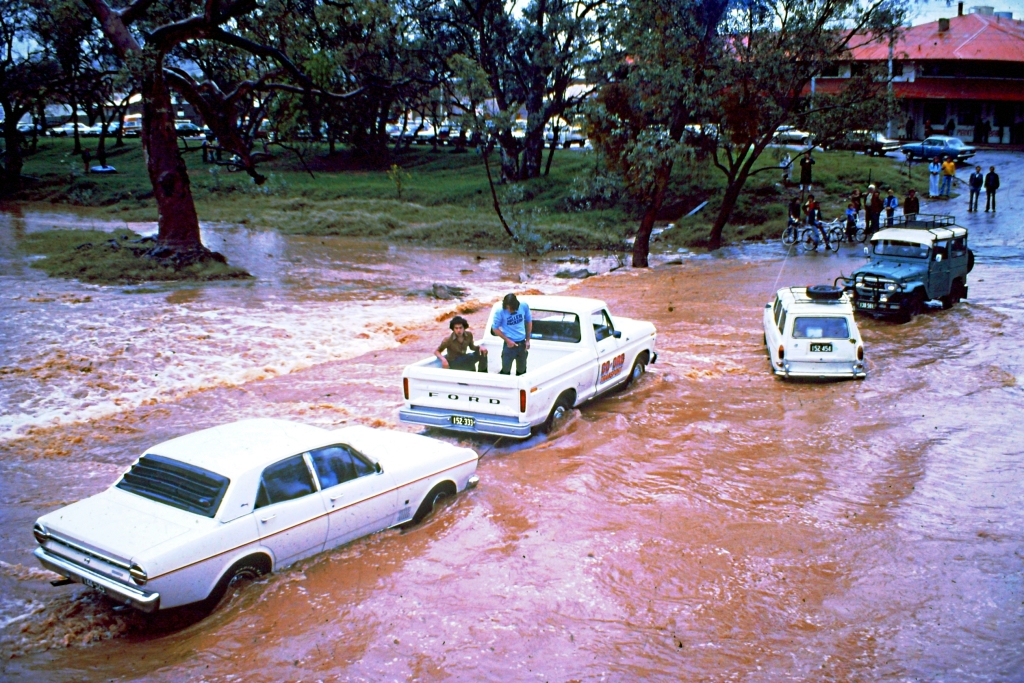
Todd River flooding in 1978

The Todd River is integral to the town of Alice Springs, which has its central business district built on the edge of the river. A large portion of the Alice Springs municipal area is situated on a flood plain of the Todd and Charles River.

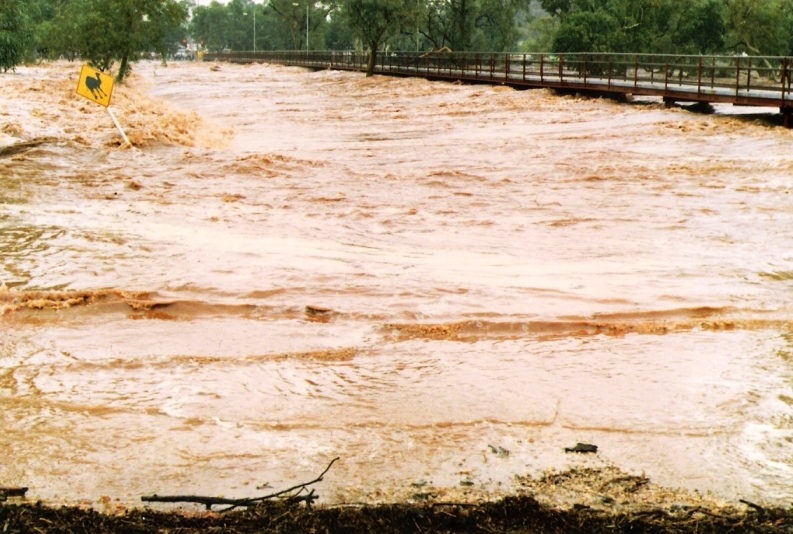
Todd River during a rare flood event, Wills Terrace Causeway, Alice Springs, 31 March 1988

Heavy rainfalls in the catchment to the north of Alice Springs cause the river to start flowing through the town around 6 to 8 hours later. The river can change from its normal dry bed to a bank-to-bank flow within 15 minutes and, in some instances the Todd River will then break its banks and flood; this can cut off road and rail access to the town.

Historian Dick Kimber says of this:

The usually dry Todd River can rise to break its banks in an hour, then be dry a day later

— Dick Kimber, as quoted in Capricious Water by Greg Blyton (2014)

Both the flow of the river and its flooding has led to numerous deaths; these deaths are primarily caused by the flow being unexpected and drowning people camping in the river, people crossing flooded causeways and lastly by people playing or swimming in the river. For this reason the Todd River drainage basin is the second most fatal location in the Northern Territory as it accounted for 21% of fatalities between 1960 and 2015 with a total of 5 deaths. One of these fatalities was in 2015 when a man died after riding a tube down the river.

The riverbed contains sites and trees sacred to the Arrente people, the Traditional Owners of Alice Springs (Mparntwe), and it has strong associations with Yeperenye (Caterpillar) Dreaming and with certain old red-river gums in the river representing Kwekatja; pre-initiated boys following the river north.

== Recreation and social events ==
The Henley-on-Todd Regatta has been held in Alice Springs annually since 1961.

== See also ==
- List of rivers of Australia § Northern Territory
