= Results of the 2021 Northern Territory local elections =

This is a list of local government area (LGA) results for the 2021 Northern Territory local elections.

== Barkly ==
2021 Barkly Regional Council election
← 2017	28 August 2021	2024 →

All 13 seats on Barkly Regional Council 7 seats needed for a majority
- Registered: 4,072
- Mayor
- Turnout: 41.3%
	First party	Second party
	IND	IND
Candidate	Jeffrey McLaughlin	Hal Ruger
Party	Independent	Independent
Primary vote	772	394
Percentage	48.3%	24.6%
TCP	65.3%	34.7%
Mayor before election
Jeffrey McLaughlin
Independent
Elected Mayor
Jeffrey McLaughlin
Independent
- Councillors
Party	Vote %	Seats	+/–
Independents		11	−1
Greens		1	+1
This lists parties that won seats. See the complete results below.

Barkly Regional Council is composed of a directly-elected mayor and twelve councillors elected across four wards. Alyawarr Ward elects four members, Patta Ward elects five, Kuwarrangu Ward elects two and Alpururrulam Ward elects one.

Jeffrey McLaughlin, who was elected mayor in 2020 through a vote of councillors following the resignation of Steve Edgington, was re-elected with 65.3% of the two-candidate-preferred vote.

Pam Corbett was elected unopposed in Alpururrulam Ward. The Greens won a seat in Barkly for the first time, with Dianne Stokes elected as a councillor for Patta Ward.

=== Barkly mayor ===
2021 Northern Territory mayoral elections: Barkly
Party	Candidate	Votes	%	±%
Independent	Jeffrey McLaughlin	772	48.3	
Independent	Hal Ruger	394	24.6	
Independent	Russell O'Donnell	310	19.4	
Independent	Brian Coleman	123	7.7	
Total formal votes		1,599	95.2	
Informal votes		81	4.8	
Turnout		1,680	41.3	
Two-candidate-preferred result
Independent	Jeffrey McLaughlin	1,044	65.3	
Independent	Hal Ruger	555	34.7	
Jeffrey McLaughlin hold				

=== Barkly results ===
2021 Northern Territory local elections: Barkly
Party	Votes	%	Swing	Seats	Change
Independents				11	▼1
Greens				1	▲1
Total		100.0	–	12	Steady
Informal votes					
Turnout					
Enrolled voters					

== Belyuen ==
2021 Belyuen Community Government Council election
← 2017	28 August 2021	2025 →
- All 5 seats on Belyuen Community Government Council; 3 seats needed for a majority
- Turnout: 65.2% (▲7.6)
Party	Vote %	Seats	+/–
Independents	100.0	5	0
This lists parties that won seats. See the complete results below.

Belyuen Community Government Council is composed of a single ward electing five councillors.

Only 138 people (out of a recorded population of 149) were enrolled to vote for the election, making Belyuen the smallest LGA in the NT by number of enrolled voters. One candidate, Claude W. Holtze, was elected with exactly one primary vote. Incumbent council president Zoe Singh lost her seat.

=== Belyuen results ===
2021 Northern Territory local elections: Belyuen
Party	Candidate	Votes	%	±%
Independent	Lenard Sing (elected 1)	26	31.7	
Independent	Teresa Timber (elected 2)	25	30.5	
Independent	Rex Edmunds (elected 3)	22	26.8	
Independent	Zoe Singh	5	6.1	
Independent	John Mango Moreen (elected 5)	2	2.4	
Independent	Claude W. Holtze (elected 4)	1	1.2	
Independent	Cecilia Lewis	1	1.2	
Total formal votes		82	91.1	
Informal votes		8	8.9	
Turnout		90	65.2	+7.6

== Central Desert ==
2021 Central Desert Regional Council election
← 2017	28 August 2021	2025 →
- All 12 seats on Central Desert Regional Council; 7 seats needed for a majority
- Turnout: 29.8% (contested wards only)
Party	Vote %	Seats	+/–
Independents	100.0	11	−1
Vacant		1	+1
This lists parties that won seats. See the complete results below.

Central Desert Regional Council is composed of twelve councillors across four wards. Akityarre Ward and Northern Tanami Ward elect two members each, while Anmatjere Ward and Southern Tanami Ward elect four members each.

Only Anmatjere Ward held an election, with all candidates in Northern Tanami Ward and Southern Tanami Ward elected unopposed. As there was only one nomination in Akityarre Ward, a by-election was held in 2022 to elect a second member.

=== Akityarre ===
2021 Northern Territory local elections: Akityarre Ward
Party	Candidate	Votes	%	±%
Independent	Billy Liddle (elected)	unopposed		
Registered electors		257		

=== Anmatjere ===
2021 Northern Territory local elections: Anmatjere Ward
Party	Candidate	Votes	%	±%
Independent	Adrian Dixon (elected 1)	76	30.2	
Independent	Jeff Iversen (elected 2)	60	23.8	
Independent	Nathaniel Dixon (elected 3)	36	14.3	
Independent	Rodney Baird	27	10.7	
Independent	James Glenn (elected 4)	25	9.9	
Independent	Alice Snape	17	6.7	
Independent	Dan Pepperill	11	4.4	
Total formal votes		252	86.3	
Informal votes		40	13.7	
Turnout		292	29.8	

=== Northern Tanami ===
2021 Northern Territory local elections: Northern Tanami Ward
Party	Candidate	Votes	%	±%
Independent	Andrew Johnson (elected)	unopposed		
Independent	Cyril Tasman (elected)	unopposed		
Registered electors		357		

=== Southern Tanami ===
2021 Northern Territory local elections: Southern Tanami Ward
Party	Candidate	Votes	%	±%
Independent	April Nangala Martin (elected)	unopposed		
Independent	Jacob Spencer (elected)	unopposed		
Independent	Fred J. Williams (elected)	unopposed		
Independent	Warren Williams (elected)	unopposed		
Registered electors		881		

== Coomalie ==
2021 Coomalie Community Government Council election
← 2017	28 August 2021	2025 →
- All 6 seats on Coomalie Community Government Council; 4 seats needed for a majority
- Turnout: 63.6% (▲6.6) (contested wards only)
Party	Vote %	Seats	+/–
Independents	100.0	6	0
This lists parties that won seats. See the complete results below.

Coomalie Community Government Council is composed of three multi-member wards, each electing two councillors. No election took place in Adelaide River Ward, where both candidates were elected unopposed.

=== Coomalie results ===
2021 Northern Territory local elections: Coomalie
Party	Votes	%	Swing	Seats	Change
Independents	257	100.0	–	6	Steady
Total	257	100.0	–	6	Steady
Informal votes	7	2.7			
Turnout	264	63.6	+6.6		
Enrolled voters	631	–	–		

=== Adelaide River ===
2021 Northern Territory local elections: Adelaide River Ward
Party	Candidate	Votes	%	±%
Independent	Sharon L. Beswick (elected)	unopposed		
Independent	Steve Bones Noble (elected)	unopposed		
Registered electors		216		

=== Batchelor Township ===
2021 Northern Territory local elections: Batchelor Township Ward
Party	Candidate	Votes	%	±%
Independent	Deborah Moyle (elected 1)	45	44.1	
Independent	Angus McClymont (elected 2)	30	29.4	
Independent	Bill Baldwin	27	44.1	
Total formal votes		102	98.1	
Informal votes		2	1.9	
Turnout		104	60.5	

=== Coomalie Rural ===
2021 Northern Territory local elections: Coomalie Rural Ward
Party	Candidate	Votes	%	±%
Independent	Colin Freeman (elected 1)	48	31.0	
Independent	Sue Bulmer (elected 2)	33	21.3	
Independent	Greg Strettles	26	16.8	
Independent	Jeremy Preston	22	14.2	
Independent	Anthony Brown	12	7.7	
Independent	Daryl William Cartledge	8	5.2	
Independent	Mary Ashley	6	3.9	
Total formal votes		155	96.9	
Informal votes		5	3.1	
Turnout		160	65.8	

== East Arnhem ==
2021 East Arnhem Regional Council election
← 2017	28 August 2021	2025 →
- All 14 seats on East Arnhem Regional Council; 8 seats needed for a majority
- Turnout: 19.9% (▲0.7) (contested wards only)
Party	Vote %	Seats	+/–
Independents	100.0	14	0
This lists parties that won seats. See the complete results below.

East Arnhem Regional Council is composed of 14 councillors elected across six multi-member wards. Four wards (Anindilyakwa, Birr Rawarrang, Gumurr Gattjirrk and Gumurr Miyarrka) elect two councillors each, while two wards (Gumurr Marthakal and Gumurr Miwatj) elect three councillors each.

All candidates in Birr Rawarrang, Gumurr Marthakal and Gumurr Miwatj were elected unopposed, as the number of candidates did not exceed the number of vacancies.

Voter turnout in Gumurr Gattjirrk Ward was 10.6%, making it the lowest turnout for any ward in the NT in 2021. The NTEC reported that voter participation was affected by several Indigenous men's ceremonies, and "as many as 40% of community members in Milingimbi were away and the outstation of Raymangirr was deserted".

=== East Arnhem results ===
2021 Northern Territory local elections: East Arnhem
Party	Votes	%	Swing	Seats	Change
Independents		100.0	–	14	Steady
Total		100.0	–	14	Steady
Informal votes					
Turnout		19.9	+0.7		
Enrolled voters	6,170		+5.0		

== Katherine ==
2021 Katherine Town Council election
← 2017	28 August 2021	2025 →

All 7 seats on Katherine Town Council 4 seats needed for a majority
- Registered: 6,321
- Mayor
- Turnout: 56.9%
	First party	Second party
	IND	IND
Candidate	Kevin South	Lis Clark
Party	Independent	Independent
Primary vote	1,177	1,073
Percentage	33.9%	30.9%
TCP	46.1%	53.9%
Mayor before election
Lis Clark
Independent
Elected Mayor
Lis Clark
Independent
- Councillors
- Turnout: 57.0% (▼6.5)
Party	Vote %	Seats	+/–
Independents	100.0	6	0
This lists parties that won seats. See the complete results below.

Katherine Town Council is composed of a directly-elected mayor and six councillors elected to a single ward.

Lis Clark was re-elected mayor with 53.9% of the two-candidate-preferred vote.

=== Katherine mayor ===
2021 Northern Territory mayoral elections: Katherine
Party	Candidate	Votes	%	±%
Independent	Kevin South	1,177	48.3	
Independent	Lis Clark	1,073	30.9	
Independent	Ben Herdon	666	19.2	
Independent	Robbie Friel	338	9.7	
Independent	Matthew James Hurley	218	6.3	
Total formal votes		3,472	96.6	
Informal votes		124	3.4	
Turnout		3,596	56.9	
Two-candidate-preferred result
Independent	Lis Clark	1,871	53.9	
Independent	Kevin South	1,601	46.1	
Lis Clark hold				

=== Katherine results ===
2021 Northern Territory local elections: Katherine
Party	Candidate	Votes	%	±%
Independent	Kym Henderson (elected 1)	641	19.3	
Independent	Jeremy Trembath (elected 2)	457	13.8	
Independent	Maddy Bower (elected 3)	438	13.2	
Independent	Ben Herdon (elected 4)	342	10.3	
Independent	Joachim David Buckerfield	182	5.5	
Independent	Amanda Kingdon (elected 5)	179	5.4	
Independent	Robbie Friel	162	4.9	
Independent	Matthew James Hurley	154	4.6	
Independent	Denis Coburn (elected 6)	152	4.6	
Independent	Colin Abbott	142	4.3	
Independent	Dirk Ambjerg	130	3.9	
Independent	Robert Chapman	108	3.3	
Independent	Peter L. F. McDougall	103	3.1	
Independent	Shirley Crane	92	2.8	
Independent	Allan Domaschenz	33	1.0	
Total formal votes		3,315	92.1	
Informal votes		285	7.9	
Turnout		3,600	57.0	−6.5

== Litchfield ==
2021 Litchfield Council election
← 2017	28 August 2021	2025 →

All 7 seats on Litchfield Council 4 seats needed for a majority
- Registered: 12,374 (▲0.9)
- Mayor
- Turnout: 75.6% (▲9.9)
	First party	Second party
	IND	IND
Candidate	Maree Bredhauer	Doug Barden
Party	Independent	Independent CLP
Primary vote	2,290	1,962
Percentage	26.5%	22.7%
TCP	45.3%	54.7%
Mayor before election
Maree Bredhauer
Independent
Elected Mayor
Doug Barden
Independent CLP
- Councillors
Party	Vote %	Seats	+/–
Independents		4	
Independent CLP		2	
This lists parties that won seats. See the complete results below.

Litchfield Council is composed of a directly-elected mayor and three multi-member wards, each electing two councillors.

Prior to the election, East Ward was abolished, resulting in the remaining wards being restructured to have two members each.

Incumbent mayor Maree Bredhauer was defeated by Doug Barden.

=== Litchfield mayor ===
2021 Northern Territory mayoral elections: Litchfield
Party	Candidate	Votes	%	±%
Independent	Maree Bredhauer	2,290	26.5	
Independent CLP	Doug Barden	1,962	22.7	
Independent	Andrew Mackay	1,648	19.0	
Independent	Mark Sidey	928	10.7	
Independent	Mathew Salter	863	10.0	
Independent	Trevor Jenkins	516	6.0	
Independent	Peter Cole	449	5.2	
Total formal votes		8,656	92.5	
Informal votes		698	7.5	
Turnout		9,354	75.6	+9.9
Two-candidate-preferred result
Independent CLP	Doug Barden	4,733	54.7	
Independent	Maree Bredhauer	3,923	45.3	
Independent CLP gain from Independent				

=== Litchfield results ===
2021 Northern Territory local elections: Litchfield
Party	Votes	%	Swing	Seats	Change
Independents				4	
Independent CLP				2	
Total		100.0	–	6	Steady
Informal votes					
Turnout					
Enrolled voters	12,374	–	+0.9		

== MacDonnell ==
2021 MacDonnell Regional Council election
← 2017	28 August 2021	2025 →
- All 12 seats on MacDonnell Regional Council; 7 seats needed for a majority
- Turnout: 39.7% (▲9.8) (contested wards only)
Party	Vote %	Seats	+/–
Independents	100.0	12	0
This lists parties that won seats. See the complete results below.

MacDonnell Regional Council is composed of four multi-member wards, totalling twelve councillors. Ljirapinta Ward elects two members, Iyarrka Ward and Luritja Pintubi Ward elect three each, and Rodinga Ward elects four.

=== MacDonnell results ===
2021 Northern Territory local elections: MacDonnell
Party	Votes	%	Swing	Seats	Change
Independents		100.0	–	12	Steady
Total		100.0	–	12	Steady
Informal votes					
Turnout		39.7	+9.8		
Enrolled voters	3,541		−1.4		

== Palmerston ==
2021 Palmerston City Council election
← 2018	28 August 2021	2025 →

All 8 seats on Palmerston City Council 5 seats needed for a majority
- Registered: 23,559 (▲10.8)
- Mayor
- Turnout: 64.7%
	First party	Second party
	IND	IND
Candidate	Athina Pascoe-Bell	Ryan Pettifer
Party	Independent	Independent
Primary vote	10,698	2,257
Percentage	74.0%	15.6%
Mayor before election
Athina Pascoe-Bell
Independent
Elected Mayor
Athina Pascoe-Bell
Independent
- Councillors
Party	Vote %	Seats	+/–
Independents	78.8	5	
Ind. Labor	16.4	1	
Independent CLP	4.8	1	
This lists parties that won seats. See the complete results below.

Palmerston City Council is composed of a directly-elected mayor and seven councillors elected to a single ward.

Athina Pascoe-Bell was re-elected as mayor with 74% of primary votes.

=== Palmerston mayor ===
2021 Northern Territory mayoral elections: Palmerston
Party	Candidate	Votes	%	±%
Independent	Athina Pascoe-Bell	10,698	74.0	
Independent	Ryan Pettifer	2,257	15.6	
Independent	Raj Samson Rajwin	1,504	10.4	
Total formal votes		14,459	95.0	
Informal votes		768	5.0	
Turnout		15,227	64.6	
Athina Pascoe-Bell hold				

=== Palmerston results ===
2021 Northern Territory local elections: Palmerston
Party	Votes	%	Swing	Seats	Change
Independents	10,972	78.8		5	
Independent Labor	2,286	16.4		1	
Independent CLP	666	4.8		1	
Total	13,924	100.0	–	7	Steady
Informal votes	1,324	8.7			
Turnout	15,248	64.7			
Enrolled voters	23,559		+10.8		

=== Palmerston councillors ===
2021 Northern Territory local elections: Palmerston
Party	Candidate	Votes	%	±%
Independent	Lucy Morrison (elected 1)	3,128	22.5	
Independent	Sarah Henderson (elected 2)	2,547	18.3	
Independent Labor	Damian Hale (elected 3)	2,286	16.4	
Independent	Amber Garden (elected 4)	1,280	9.2	
Independent	Raj Samson Rajwin	1,197	8.6	
Independent CLP	Ben Giesecke (elected 6)	666	4.8	
Independent	Mark Fraser (elected 5)	598	4.3	
Independent	Themis Magoulias	561	4.0	
Independent	Colin Southam	534	3.8	
Independent	Danielle Eveleigh (elected 7)	510	3.7	
Independent	Dave Eakins	414	3.0	
Independent	Gregory Knowles	203	1.5	
Total formal votes		13,924	91.3	
Informal votes		1,324	8.7	
Turnout		15,248	64.7	

== Roper Gulf ==
2021 Roper Gulf Regional Council election
← 2017	28 August 2021	2025 →
- All 13 seats on Roper Gulf Regional Council; 7 seats needed for a majority
- Turnout: 35.4% (▼3.4) (contested wards only)
Party	Vote %	Seats	+/–
Independents	100.0	13	0
This lists parties that won seats. See the complete results below.

Roper Gulf Regional Council is composed of five multi-member wards, totalling 13 councillors. Numbulwar Numburindi and Yugul Mangi elect two members, and Never Never, Nyirranggulung and South West Gulf elect three.

=== Roper Gulf results ===
2021 Northern Territory local elections: Roper Gulf
Party	Votes	%	Swing	Seats	Change
Independents		100.0	–	13	Steady
Total		100.0	–	13	Steady
Informal votes					
Turnout		35.4	−3.4		
Enrolled voters	3,902		−1.3		

== Tiwi Islands ==
2021 Tiwi Islands Regional Council election
← 2017	28 August 2021	2025 →
- All 12 seats on Tiwi Islands Regional Council; 7 seats needed for a majority
- Turnout: 50.0% (▲2.5)
Party	Vote %	Seats	+/–
Independents		11	
Independent CLP		1	
This lists parties that won seats. See the complete results below.

Tiwi Islands Regional Council is composed of three multi-member wards, totalling twelve councillors. Bathurst Island Ward elects six members, while Milikapiti Ward and Pirlangimpi Ward elect three each.

=== Tiwi Islands results ===
2021 Northern Territory local elections: Tiwi Islands
Party	Votes	%	Swing	Seats	Change
Independents				11	
Independent CLP				1	
Total		100.0	–	12	Steady
Informal votes					
Turnout		50.0	+2.5		
Enrolled voters	1,650	–	+0.9		

== Victoria Daly ==
2021 Victoria Daly Regional Council election
← 2017	28 August 2021	2025 →
- All 5 seats on Victoria Daly Regional Council; 3 seats needed for a majority
- Turnout: 33.2% (▼6.7) (contested wards only)
Party	Vote %	Seats	+/–
Independents	100.0	5	0
This lists parties that won seats. See the complete results below.

Victoria Daly Regional Council is composed of five single-member wards.

=== Victoria Daly results ===
2021 Northern Territory local elections: Victoria Daly
Party	Votes	%	Swing	Seats	Change
Independents		100.0	–	5	Steady
Total		100.0	–	5	Steady
Informal votes					
Turnout		33.2	−6.7		
Enrolled voters	1,712		+0.1		

== Wagait ==
2021 Wagait Shire Council election
← 2017	28 August 2021	2025 →
- All 5 seats on Wagait Shire Council; 3 seats needed for a majority
- Turnout: 78.6% (▲2.7)
Party	Vote %	Seats	+/–
Independents	100.0	5	0
This lists parties that won seats. See the complete results below.

Wagait Shire Council is composed of five councillors elected to a single ward.

=== Wagait results ===
2021 Northern Territory local elections: Wagait
Party	Candidate	Votes	%	±%
Independent	Michael Vaughan (elected 1)	95	42.2	
Independent	Neil White (elected 2)	39	17.3	
Independent	Peter Clee (elected 5)	28	12.4	
Independent	Noeletta McKenzie (elected 4)	24	10.7	
Independent	Rick Gosper	20	8.9	
Independent	Tom Dyer (elected 3)	19	8.4	
Total formal votes		225	95.7	
Informal votes		10	4.3	
Turnout		235	78.6	+2.7

== West Arnhem ==
2021 West Arnhem Regional Council election
← 2017	28 August 2021	2025 →
- All 12 seats on West Arnhem Regional Council; 7 seats needed for a majority
- Turnout: 27.6% (▲7.1)
Party	Vote %	Seats	+/–
Independents	100.0	12	0
This lists parties that won seats. See the complete results below.

West Arnhem Regional Council is composed of five wards, totalling twelve councillors. Minjilang Ward and Warruwi Ward elect one member each, Gunbalanya Ward and Kakadu Ward elect three each, and Maningrida Ward elects four.

Prior to the election, Barrah Ward was abolished. It was replaced by Minjilang Ward (covering Croker Island) and Warruwi Ward (covering all other areas that were formerly part of Barrah Ward).

=== West Arnhem results ===
2021 Northern Territory local elections: West Arnhem
Party	Votes	%	Swing	Seats	Change
Independents		100.0	–	12	Steady
Total		100.0	–	12	Steady
Informal votes					
Turnout		27.6	+7.1		
Enrolled voters	3,578		−4.0		

== West Daly ==
2021 West Daly Regional Council election
← 2017	28 August 2021	2025 →
- All 6 seats on West Daly Regional Council; 4 seats needed for a majority
- Turnout: 30.7% (▼5.1)
Party	Vote %	Seats	+/–
Independents	100.0	5	−1
Vacant		1	+1
This lists parties that won seats. See the complete results below.

West Daly Regional Council is composed of three wards, totalling six councillors. Thamarrurr/Pindi Pindi Ward elects four members, while Nganmarriyanga Ward and Tyemirri Ward elect one each.

There were no nominations in Nganmarriyanga Ward, requiring a by-election to be held in 2022.

=== West Daly results ===
2021 Northern Territory local elections: West Daly
Party	Votes	%	Swing	Seats	Change
Independents		100.0	–	5	▼1
Vacant				1	▲1
Total		100.0	–	6	Steady
Informal votes					
Turnout		30.7	−5.1		
Enrolled voters	1,868		+4.0		
