= Results of the 2017 Northern Territory local elections =

This is a list of local government area (LGA) results for the 2017 Northern Territory local elections.

== Alice Springs ==
2017 Alice Springs Town Council election
← 2012	26 August 2017	2021 →

All 9 seats on the Alice Springs Town Council
- Registered: 14,357 (▲13.6)
- Mayor
- Turnout: 68.9%
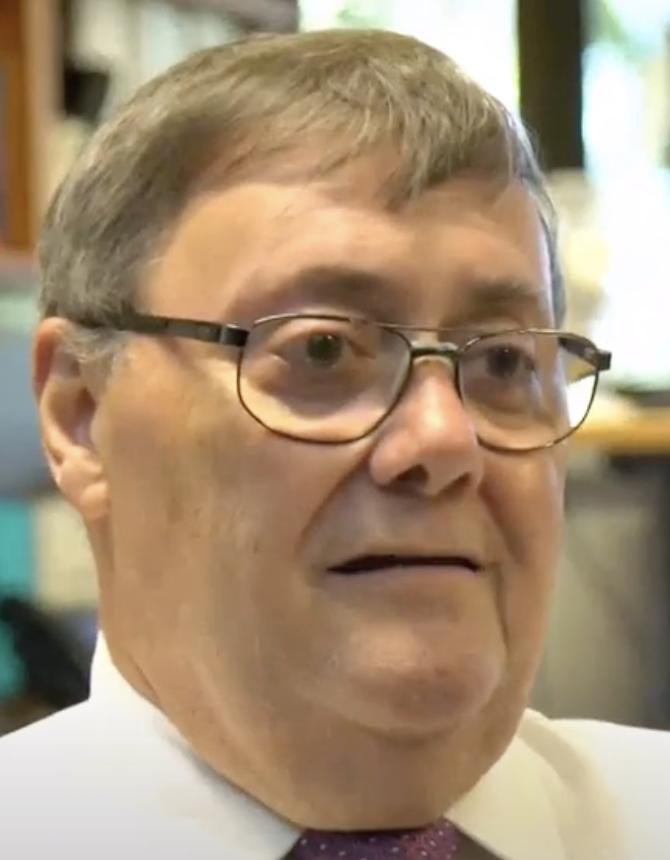
	First party	Second party
		IND
Candidate	Damien Ryan	Jimmy Cocking
Party	Ind. Country Liberal	Independent
Primary vote	6,446	3,423
Percentage	65.3%	34.7%
Mayor before election
Damien Ryan
Ind. Country Liberal
Elected Mayor
Damien Ryan
Ind. Country Liberal
- Councillors
Party	Vote %	Seats	+/–
Independents	77.1	7	
Independent CLP	22.9	1	
This lists parties that won seats. See the complete results below.

Alice Springs Town Council is composed of a directly-elected mayor and eight councillors elected to a single ward.

Damien Ryan was re-elected to a third term, becoming the longest-serving mayor of Alice Springs.

=== Alice Springs mayor ===
2021 Northern Territory mayoral elections: Alice Springs
Party	Candidate	Votes	%	±%
Independent CLP	Damien Ryan	6,446	65.3	
Independent	Jimmy Cocking	3,423	34.7	
Total formal votes		9,869	99.7	
Informal votes		27	0.3	
Turnout		9,896	68.9	
Independent CLP hold		Swing		

=== Alice Springs councillors ===
2021 Northern Territory local elections: Alice Springs
Party	Candidate	Votes	%	±%
Independent CLP	Jacinta Nampijinpa Price (elected 1)	2,035	22.9	
Independent	Jimmy Cocking (elected 2)	1,430	16.1	
Independent	Jamie De Brenn (elected 3)	825	9.3	
Independent	Eli Melky (elected 4)	785	8.8	
Independent	Matt Paterson (elected 5)	499	5.6	
Independent	Catherine Satour (elected 6)	213	2.4	
Independent	Marli Banks (elected 7)	287	3.2	
Independent	Glen Auricht (elected 8)	489	5.5	
Independent	Jodi Lennox	354	4.0	
Independent	Murray Stewart	286	3.2	
Independent	Jenni Lillis	271	3.1	
Independent	Donna Lemon	167	1.9	
Independent	John Adams	171	1.9	
Independent	Donna Digby	107	1.2	
Independent	John Paul Sirus	178	2.0	
Independent	Vince Jeisman	152	1.7	
Independent	Paull Alekna	154	1.7	
Independent	Jason Quin	97	1.1	
Total formal votes		8,882	88.3	
Informal votes		1,178	11.7	
Turnout		10,060		

== Barkly ==
2017 Barkly Regional Council election
← 2012	26 August 2017	2021 →

All 13 seats on the Barkly Regional Council
- President
	First party	Second party
	IND	IND
Candidate	Steve Edgington	Jeffrey McLaughlin
Party	Independent	Independent
Primary vote	1,016	332
Percentage	51.1%	16.7%
President before election
Barb Shaw
Independent
Elected President
Steve Edgington
Independent
- Councillors
Party	Vote %	Seats	+/–
Independents	100.0	12	
This lists parties that won seats. See the complete results below.

Barkly Regional Council is composed of a directly-elected mayor and twelve councillors elected across four wards.

=== Barkly president ===
2017 Northern Territory mayoral elections: Barkly
Party	Candidate	Votes	%	±%
Independent	Steve Edgington	1,016	51.1	
Independent	Jeffrey McLaughlin	332	16.7	
Independent	Narelle Bremner	289	14.5	
Independent	Pat Brahim	221	11.1	
Independent	Christine Revell	70	3.5	
Independent	Brian Coleman	62	3.1	
Total formal votes		1,990		
Informal votes				
Turnout				
hold		Swing		

=== Alyawarr ===
2017 Northern Territory local elections: Alyawarr Ward
Party	Candidate	Votes	%	±%
Independent	Lucy Jackson (elected)	unopposed		
Independent	Jack Clubb (elected)	unopposed		
Independent	Noel Hayes (elected)	unopposed		
Independent	Ricky Holmes (elected)	unopposed		
Registered electors				

=== Alpurrurulam ===
2021 Northern Territory local elections: Alpurrurulam Ward
Party	Candidate	Votes	%	±%
Independent	Jennifer Mahoney (elected 1)	50	61.7	
Independent	Garry John Koppes	31	38.3	
Total formal votes		81		
Informal votes				
Turnout				

=== Kuwarrangu ===
2021 Northern Territory local elections: Kuwarrangu Ward
Party	Candidate	Votes	%	±%
Independent	Jane Evans (elected 1)	124	61.7	
Independent	Ray Aylett (elected 2)	64	31.8	
Independent	Alan Revell	13	6.5	
Total formal votes		201		
Informal votes				
Turnout				

=== Patta ===
2021 Northern Territory local elections: Patta Ward
Party	Candidate	Votes	%	±%
Independent	Kris Civitarese	296	27.5	
Independent	Darrin Whatley	21	2.0	
Independent	Brian Coleman	14	1.3	
Independent	Joyce Taylor	26	2.4	
Independent	Hal Ruger	88	8.2	
Independent	Sid Vashist	254	23.6	
Independent	Christine Revell	10	0.9	
Independent	Narelle Bremner	70	6.5	
Independent	Jeffrey McLaughlin	85	7.9	
Independent	Pat Brahim	41	3.8	
Independent	Tristan Duggie	75	7.0	
Independent	Ronald Plummer	95	8.8	
Total formal votes		1,075	90.1	
Informal votes		118	9.9	
Turnout		1,193	60.8	

== Belyuen ==
2017 Belyuen Community Government Council election
← 2012	26 August 2017	2021 →

All 5 seats on the Belyuen Community Government Council
- Turnout: 83 (57.6%)
	First party
	IND
Party	Independent
Seats won	5
Primary vote	73
Percentage	100.0%
Largest party before election
Independents
Largest party after election
Independents

=== Belyuen results ===
2021 Northern Territory local elections: Belyuen Community Government
Party	Candidate	Votes	%	±%
Independent	Rex Edmunds (elected 1)	40	54.8	
Independent	Cecilia Lewis (elected 2)	2	2.7	
Independent	Zoe Singh (elected 3)	8	11.0	
Independent	Roger Yarrowin (elected 4)	6	8.2	
Independent	John Moreen (elected 5)	4	5.5	
Independent	Trevor Bianamu	7	9.6	
Independent	Raylene Singh	3	4.1	
Independent	Gavin Bianamu	3	4.1	
Independent	Lorraine Lane	0	0.0	
Total formal votes		73	88.0	
Informal votes		10	12.0	
Turnout		83	57.6	
