= Results of the 2025 Northern Territory local elections =

This is a list of local government area (LGA) results for the 2025 Northern Territory local elections. 34 elections were held on 23 August 2025, with 19 completed at the close of candidate nominations after being uncontested or declared partially failed by the Northern Territory Electoral Commission (NTEC).

== Belyuen ==
2025 Belyuen Community Government Council election
← 2021	23 August 2025	2029 →
- All 5 seats on Belyuen Community Government Council
Party	Vote %	Seats	+/–
Independents	100.0	5	0
This lists parties that won seats. See the complete results below.

Belyuen Community Government Council is composed of a single ward electing five councillors.

All five candidates were elected unopposed.

=== Belyuen results ===
2025 Northern Territory local elections: Belyuen
Party	Candidate	Votes	%	±%
Independent	Rex Sing (elected)	unopposed		
Independent	Leikeisha Woodie (elected)	unopposed		
Independent	Linda Yarrowin (elected)	unopposed		
Independent	Daphne Yarrowin (elected)	unopposed		
Independent	Angelina Lewis (elected)	unopposed		
Registered electors		173		

== Central Desert ==
2025 Central Desert Regional Council election
← 2021	23 August 2025	2029 →
- All 12 seats on Central Desert Regional Council
- Turnout: 10.0% (▼19.8) (contested wards only)
Party	Vote %	Seats	+/–
Independents	100.0	11	0
Vacant		1	0
This lists parties that won seats. See the complete results below.

Central Desert Regional Council is composed of twelve councillors across four wards. Akityarre Ward and Northern Tanami Ward elect two members each, while Anmatjere Ward and Southern Tanami Ward elect four members each.

Only Southern Tanami held an election, with all candidates in Anmatjere Ward and Northern Tanami Ward elected unopposed. As there was only one nomination in Akityarre Ward, a by-election will be held.

=== Akityarre ===
2025 Northern Territory local elections: Akityarre Ward
Party	Candidate	Votes	%	±%
Independent	Rosslyn Campbell (elected)	unopposed		
Registered electors		280		

=== Anmatjere ===
2025 Northern Territory local elections: Anmatjere Ward
Party	Candidate	Votes	%	±%
Independent	Adrian Dixon (elected)	unopposed		
Independent	Jeff Iverson (elected)	unopposed		
Independent	David McCormack (elected)	unopposed		
Independent	Clifford Tilmouth (elected)	unopposed		
Registered electors		1,019		

=== Northern Tanami ===
2025 Northern Territory local elections: Northern Tanami Ward
Party	Candidate	Votes	%	±%
Independent	Cyril Tasman (elected)	unopposed		
Independent	Andrew Johnson (elected)	unopposed		
Registered electors		465		

=== Southern Tanami ===
2025 Northern Territory local elections: Southern Tanami Ward
Party	Candidate	Votes	%	±%
Independent	April Martin (elected 1)	21	23.3	
Independent	Paul Briscoe (elected 2)	20	20.2	
Independent	Michaeline Gallagher (elected 3)	14	15.6	
Independent	Jacob Jungarai Spencer (elected 4)	14	15.6	
Independent	Freddy Williams	11	12.2	
Independent	Fiona Gibson	10	11.1	
Total formal votes		90	95.7	
Informal votes		4	4.3	
Turnout		94	10.0	

== Coomalie ==
2025 Coomalie Community Government Council election
← 2021	23 August 2025	2029 →
- All 6 seats on Coomalie Community Government Council
Party	Vote %	Seats	+/–
Independents	100.0	6	0
This lists parties that won seats. See the complete results below.

Coomalie Community Government Council is composed of three multi-member wards, each electing two councillors.

=== Adelaide River ===
2025 Northern Territory local elections: Adelaide River Ward
Party	Candidate	Votes	%	±%
Independent	Sharon Beswick (elected 1)	59	37.6	
Independent	Alan Roe (elected 2)	50	31.8	
Independent	Stephen Bones Noble	30	19.1	
Independent	Neil MacDonald	18	11.5	
Total formal votes		157	95.2	
Informal votes		8	4.8	
Turnout		165	66.0	

=== Batchelor Township ===
2025 Northern Territory local elections: Batchelor Township Ward
Party	Candidate	Votes	%	±%
Independent	MaeMae Morrison (elected 1)	47	41.6	
Independent	Ross McGorman (elected 2)	21	18.6	
Independent	Margaret Couper	21	18.6	
Independent	Tony Croton	16	14.2	
Independent	Mary Ashley	8	7.1	
Total formal votes		113	95.8	
Informal votes		5	4.2	
Turnout		118	53.4	

=== Coomalie Rural ===
2025 Northern Territory local elections: Coomalie Rural Ward
Party	Candidate	Votes	%	±%
Independent	Chris Whatley (elected 1)	63	42.9	
Independent	Greg Strettles (elected 2)	39	26.5	
Independent	Cheryl Campbell	35	23.8	
Independent	Cherrian Luxton	10	6.8	
Total formal votes		147	94.2	
Informal votes		9	5.8	
Turnout		156	55.9	

== East Arnhem ==
2025 East Arnhem Regional Council election
← 2021	23 August 2025	2029 →
- All 12 seats on East Arnhem Regional Council
Party	Vote %	Seats	+/–
Independents	100.0	12	−2
This lists parties that won seats. See the complete results below.

East Arnhem Regional Council is composed of twelve councillors elected across six multi-member wards. Three wards (Birr Rawarrang, Gumurr Gattjirrk and Gumurr Miyarrka) elect two councillors each, while two wards (Gumurr Marthakal and Gumurr Miwatj) elect three councillors each.

Anindilyakwa Ward, which elected two members, was abolished prior to the election following the establishment of the Groote Archipelago Regional Council in 2024.

=== Birr Rawarrang ===
2025 Northern Territory local elections: Birr Rawarrang Ward
Party	Candidate	Votes	%	±%
Independent	David Warraya	49	41.5	
Independent	Jason Mirritjawuy	49	41.5	
Independent	Rexy Djarrkadama	20	16.9	
Total formal votes		118	96.7	
Informal votes		4	3.3	
Turnout		122	14.1	

=== Gumurr Gattjirrk ===
2025 Northern Territory local elections: Gumurr Gattjirrk Ward
Party	Candidate	Votes	%	±%
Independent	Keith Lapulung Dhamarrandji			
Independent	Jacinta Burukumalawuy			
Independent	Ganygulpa Dhurrkay			
Independent	John Ryan			
Independent	Joe Djakala			
Total formal votes				
Informal votes				
Turnout				

=== Gumurr Marthakal ===
2025 Northern Territory local elections: Gumurr Marthakal Ward
Party	Candidate	Votes	%	±%
Independent	Stephen Dhamarrandji	129	62.6	
Independent	Cyril Bukulatjpi	31	15	
Independent	Gurrumgurrum Burarrwanga	26	12.6	
Independent	Evelyna Dhamarrandji	20	9.7	
Total formal votes		206	94.5	
Informal votes		12	5.5	
Turnout		218	11.3	

=== Gumurr Miwatj ===
2025 Northern Territory local elections: Gumurr Miwatj Ward
Party	Candidate	Votes	%	±%
Independent	Murphy Yunupingu (elected)	unopposed		
Independent	Marrpalawuy Marika (elected)	unopposed		
Independent	Priscilla Yunupingu (elected)	unopposed		
Registered electors		1,738		

=== Gumurr Miyarrka ===
2025 Northern Territory local elections: Gumurr Miyarrka Ward
Party	Candidate	Votes	%	±%
Independent	Bobby Wunungmurra (elected)	unopposed		
Independent	Wesley Bandi Bandi Wunungmurra (elected)	unopposed		
Registered electors		987		

== Katherine ==
2025 Katherine Town Council election
← 2021	23 August 2025	2029 →

All 7 seats on Katherine Town Council
- Mayor
	First party	Second party
	IND	IND
Candidate	Joanna Holden	Mel Doyle
Party	Independent	Independent
Mayor before election
Lis Clark
Independent
Elected Mayor
TBD
- Councillors
Party	Vote %	Seats	+/–
Independents			
This lists parties that won seats. See the complete results below.

Katherine Town Council is composed of a directly-elected mayor and six councillors elected to a single ward. Lis Clark did not seek re-election as mayor, having served in the role since January 2021.

=== Katherine mayor ===
2025 Northern Territory mayoral elections: Katherine
Party	Candidate	Votes	%	±%
Independent	Joanna Holden	1,402	39.5	
Independent	Mel Doyle	476	13.4	
Independent	Wayne Connop	441	12.4	
Independent	Anjali Palmer	389	11	
Independent	Amanda Kingdon	376	10.6	
Independent	Cristian Coman	241	6.8	
Independent	Jon Raynor	227	6.4	
Total formal votes		3,552	94.8	
Informal votes		195	5.2	
Turnout		3,747	54.7	

=== Katherine results ===
2025 Northern Territory local elections: Katherine
Party	Candidate	Votes	%	±%
Independent	Peter McDougall			
Independent	Kathy Glass			
Independent	Cristian Coman			
Independent	Kathryn Whitehouse			
Independent	Toni Tapp Coutts			
Independent	Jim King			
Independent	Ron Green			
Independent	Anjali Palmer			
Independent	Wayne Connop			
Independent	Lee Fortmann			
Independent	Mel Doyle			
Independent	Amanda Kingdon			
Independent	Kerrie Mott			
Independent	Jon Raynor			
Independent	Matt Hurley			
Independent	Dirk Ambjerg			
Independent	Ian David Clark			
Independent	Matt Morton			
Total formal votes				
Informal votes				
Turnout				

== Litchfield ==
2025 Litchfield Council election
← 2021	23 August 2025	2029 →

All 7 seats on Litchfield Council
- Registered: 14,169
- Mayor
- Turnout: 67.0% (▼8.6)
	First party	Second party
	IND	IND
Candidate	Rachael Wright	Doug Barden
Party	Independent	Independent CLP
Primary vote	3,394	2,545
Percentage	38.9%	29.2%
Swing	▲38.9	▲6.5
TCP	57.8%	42.2%
TCP swing	▲57.8	▼12.5
Mayor before election
Doug Barden
Independent CLP
Elected Mayor
Rachael Wright
Independent
- Councillors
Party	Vote %	Seats	+/–
Independents			
This lists parties that won seats. See the complete results below.

Litchfield Council is composed of a directly-elected mayor and three multi-member wards, each electing two councillors.

=== Litchfield mayor ===
2025 Northern Territory mayoral elections: Litchfield
Party	Candidate	Votes	%	±%
Independent	Rachael Wright	3,394	38.9	+38.9
Independent CLP	Doug Barden	2,545	29.2	+6.5
Independent	Mark Sidey	844	9.7	–1.0
Independent	Darren Nugent	835	9.6	+9.6
Independent	Sue Stanton	679	7.8	+7.8
Independent	Tony Pritchard	430	4.9	+4.9
Total formal votes		8,727	92.0	–0.5
Informal votes		762	8.0	+0.5
Turnout		9,489	67.0	–8.6
Rachael Wright gain from Doug Barden				

=== Central ===
2025 Northern Territory local elections: Central Ward
Party	Candidate	Votes	%	±%
Independent	Kev Harlan	826	27.1	
Independent	Cecilia Coleman	700	22.9	
Independent	Pauline Cass	543	17.8	
Independent	Darren Nugent	444	14.5	
Independent	Sherry Namatovu	391	12.8	
Independent	Tony Pritchard	149	4.9	
Total formal votes		3,053	91.8	
Informal votes		274	8.2	
Turnout		3,327	68.5	

=== North ===
2025 Northern Territory local elections: North Ward
Party	Candidate	Votes	%	±%
Independent	Rachael Wright (elected)	unopposed		
Independent	Daisy Crawford (elected)	unopposed		
Registered electors		4,555		

=== South ===
2025 Northern Territory local elections: South Ward
Party	Candidate	Votes	%	±%
Independent	Kris Civitarese	1,378	45.6	
Independent	Emma Sharp	794	26.3	
Independent	Beckie Kernich	679	22.5	
Independent	Sue Stanton	169	5.6	
Total formal votes		3,020	94.9	
Informal votes		161	5.1	
Turnout		3,181	66.4	

== MacDonnell ==
2025 MacDonnell Regional Council election
← 2021	23 August 2025	2029 →
- All 12 seats on MacDonnell Regional Council
Party	Vote %	Seats	+/–
Independents	100.0	12	0
This lists parties that won seats. See the complete results below.

MacDonnell Regional Council is composed of four multi-member wards, totalling twelve councillors. Ljirapinta Ward elects two members, Iyarrka Ward and Luritja Pintubi Ward elect three each, and Rodinga Ward elects four.

=== Iyarrka ===
2025 Northern Territory local elections: Iyarrka Ward
Party	Candidate	Votes	%	±%
Independent	Peter Wilson			
Independent	Abraham Poulson			
Independent	Marlene Abbott			
Independent	Lyle Kenny			
Total formal votes				
Informal votes				
Turnout				

=== Ljirapinta ===
2025 Northern Territory local elections: Ljirapinta Ward
Party	Candidate	Votes	%	±%
Independent	Mark Inkamala			
Independent	Maryanne Malbunka			
Independent	Roxanne Kenny			
Independent	Conrad Ratara			
Total formal votes				
Informal votes				
Turnout				

=== Luritja Pintubi ===
2025 Northern Territory local elections: Luritja Pintubi Ward
Party	Candidate	Votes	%	±%
Independent	Tommy Conway			
Independent	Lynn Ward			
Independent	Dalton McDonald			
Independent	Garrard Anderson			
Total formal votes				
Informal votes				
Turnout				

=== Rodinga ===
2025 Northern Territory local elections: Rodinga Ward
Party	Candidate	Votes	%	±%
Independent	Veronica Lynch Kngwarraye (elected)	unopposed		
Independent	Patrick Allen (elected)	unopposed		
Independent	Andrew Davis (elected)	unopposed		
Registered electors		1,279		

== Palmerston ==
2025 Palmerston City Council election
← 2021	23 August 2025	2029 →

All 8 seats on Palmerston City Council
- Registered: 25,914
- Mayor
- Turnout: 57.3% (▼7.3)
	First party	Second party
	IND	IND
Candidate	Athina Pascoe-Bell	Rob Waters
Party	Independent	Independent CLP
Primary vote	6,772	2,933
Percentage	48.8%	21.1%
Swing	▼25.2	▲21.1
After preferences	50.5%	24.6%
Mayor before election
Athina Pascoe-Bell
Independent
Elected Mayor
Athina Pascoe-Bell
Independent
- Councillors
- Turnout: 57.0% (▼7.7)
Party	Vote %	Seats	+/–
Independents	81.1	5	0
Independent CLP	9.6	1	0
Ind. Labor	9.3	1	0
This lists parties that won seats. See the complete results below.

Palmerston City Council is composed of a directly-elected mayor and seven councillors elected to a single ward.

=== Palmerston mayor ===
2025 Northern Territory mayoral elections: Palmerston
Party	Candidate	Votes	%	±%
Independent	Athina Pascoe-Bell	6,772	48.8	–25.2
Independent CLP	Rob Waters	2,933	21.1	+21.1
Independent Labor	Dani Eveleigh	1,824	13.1	+13.1
Independent	Cindy Mebbingarri Roberts	1,218	8.8	+8.8
Independent	Raj Samson Rajwin	973	7.0	–3.4
Independent	Appa Rao Adari	167	1.2	+1.2
Total formal votes		13,887	93.6	–1.4
Informal votes		955	6.4	+1.4
Turnout		14,842	57.3	–7.3
After distribution of preferences
Independent	Athina Pascoe-Bell	7,015	50.5	+50.5
Independent CLP	Rob Waters	3,410	24.6	+24.6
Independent Labor	Dani Eveleigh	2,016	14.5	+14.5
Independent	Cindy Mebbingarri Roberts	1,446	10.4	+10.4
Athina Pascoe-Bell hold				

=== Palmerston results ===
2025 Northern Territory local elections: Palmerston
Party	Candidate	Votes	%	±%
Independent	Lucy Morrison (elected 1)	2,038	15.0	
Independent CLP	Wayne Bayliss (elected 2)	1,739	12.8	
Independent CLP	Rob Waters (elected 3)	1,302	9.6	
Independent Labor	Damian Hale (elected 7)	1,261	9.3	
Independent	Mark Fraser (elected 6)	1,120	8.3	
Independent Labor	Yolanda Kanyai (elected 5)	1,091	8.0	
Independent	Sarah Henderson (elected 4)	1,041	7.7	
Independent	Ben Giesecke	976	7.2	
Independent	Cindy Mebbingarri Roberts	833	6.1	
Independent	Jacob Brant	785	5.8	
Independent	Raj Samson Rajwin	478	3.5	
Independent	Melissa Maguire	403	3.0	
Independent	Colin Southam	298	2.2	
Independent	Appa Rao Adari	114	0.8	
Independent	John-Paul MacDonagh	90	0.7	
Total formal votes		13,569	91.9	
Informal votes		1,197	8.1	
Turnout		14,766	57.0	

== Roper Gulf ==
2025 Roper Gulf Regional Council election
← 2021	23 August 2025	2029 →
- All 13 seats on Roper Gulf Regional Council
Party	Vote %	Seats	+/–
Independents	100.0	13	0
This lists parties that won seats. See the complete results below.

Roper Gulf Regional Council is composed of five multi-member wards, totalling 13 councillors. Numbulwar Numburindi and Yugul Mangi elect two members, and Never Never, Nyirranggulung and South West Gulf elect three.

=== Never Never ===
2025 Northern Territory local elections: Never Never Ward
Party	Candidate	Votes	%	±%
Independent	Edna Prescilla Iles			
Independent	Rosemary Joshua			
Independent	Cecilia Lake			
Independent	Des Barritt			
Independent	Sue Edwards			
Independent	Patricia Farrell			
Total formal votes				
Informal votes				
Turnout				

=== Numbulwar Numburindi ===
2025 Northern Territory local elections: Numbulwar Numburindi Ward
Party	Candidate	Votes	%	±%
Independent	Kathy-Anne Numamurdirdi (elected)	unopposed		
Independent	Edwin Nunggumajbarr (elected)	unopposed		
Registered electors		576		

=== Nyirranggulung ===
2025 Northern Territory local elections: Nyirranggulung Ward
Party	Candidate	Votes	%	±%
Independent	John Dalywater			
Independent	Preston Lee			
Independent	Helen Leanne Lee			
Independent	Selina Ashley			
Independent	Anne Marie Lee			
Total formal votes				
Informal votes				
Turnout				

=== South West Gulf ===
2025 Northern Territory local elections: South West Gulf Ward
Party	Candidate	Votes	%	±%
Independent	Tony Jack			
Independent	Ash Garner			
Independent	Samuel Evans			
Independent	Gadrian Hoosan			
Total formal votes				
Informal votes				
Turnout				

=== Yugul Mangi ===
2025 Northern Territory local elections: Yugul Mangi Ward
Party	Candidate	Votes	%	±%
Independent	Melissa Andrews-Wurramarrba (elected)	unopposed		
Registered electors		856		

== Tiwi Islands ==
2025 Tiwi Islands Regional Council election
← 2021	23 August 2025	2029 →
- All 12 seats on Roper Gulf Regional Council
Party	Vote %	Seats	+/–
Independents	100.0	12	0
This lists parties that won seats. See the complete results below.

Tiwi Islands Regional Council is composed of three multi-member wards, totalling twelve councillors. Bathurst Island Ward elects six members, while Milikapiti Ward and Pirlangimpi Ward elect three each.

=== Bathurst Island ===
2025 Northern Territory local elections: Bathurst Island Ward
Party	Candidate	Votes	%	±%
Independent	Stanley Tipiloura			
Independent	Mary Dunn			
Independent	Jennifer Ullungura Clancy			
Independent	Brian Tipungwuti			
Independent	Luke Tipuamantumirri			
Independent	John Pilakui			
Total formal votes				
Informal votes				
Turnout				

=== Milikapiti ===
2025 Northern Territory local elections: Milikapiti Ward
Party	Candidate	Votes	%	±%
Independent	Pius Sarto Tipungwuti (elected)	unopposed		
Independent	Lynette Jane De Santis (elected)	unopposed		
Independent	Jeffrey Simon Ullungura (elected)	unopposed		
Registered electors		344		

=== Pirlangimpi ===
2025 Northern Territory local elections: Pirlangimpi Ward
Party	Candidate	Votes	%	±%
Independent	Deanne Rioli			
Independent	Rebekah Yunupingu			
Independent	Daniel Costa			
Independent	Joseph Gideon Pangiraminni			
Independent	Therese Bourke			
Total formal votes				
Informal votes				
Turnout				

== Victoria Daly ==
2025 Victoria Daly Regional Council election
← 2021	23 August 2025	2029 →
- All 5 seats on Victoria Daly Regional Council
- Turnout: 36.3% (▲3.1) (contested wards only)
Party	Vote %	Seats	+/–
Independents	100.0	5	0
This lists parties that won seats. See the complete results below.

Victoria Daly Regional Council is composed of five single-member wards.

=== Daguragu ===
2025 Northern Territory local elections: Daguragu Ward
Party	Candidate	Votes	%	±%
Independent	Georgina Louise Macleod (elected)	unopposed		
Registered electors		505		
Georgina Louise Macleod hold				

=== Milngin ===
2025 Northern Territory local elections: Milngin Ward
Party	Candidate	Votes	%	±%
Independent	Andrew Victor McTaggart	82	62.6	
Independent	John Bonson	49	37.4	
Total formal votes		131	99.2	
Informal votes		1	0.8	
Turnout		132	36.3	
Andrew Victor McTaggart hold				

=== Pine Creek ===
2025 Northern Territory local elections: Pine Creek Ward
Party	Candidate	Votes	%	±%
Independent	Yvette Williams (elected)	unopposed		
Registered electors		230		
Yvette Williams hold				

=== Timber Creek ===
2025 Northern Territory local elections: Timber Creek Ward
Party	Candidate	Votes	%	±%
Independent	Deborah Jones (elected)	unopposed		
Registered electors		438		
Deborah Jones gain from Shirley Anne Garlett				

=== Walangeri ===
2025 Northern Territory local elections: Walangeri Ward
Party	Candidate	Votes	%	±%
Independent	Brian Pedwell (elected)	unopposed		
Registered electors		367		
Brian Pedwell hold				

== Wagait ==
2025 Wagait Shire Council election
← 2021	23 August 2025	2029 →
- All 5 seats on Wagait Shire Council
- Turnout: 74.5% (▼4.1)
Party	Vote %	Seats	+/–
Independents	100.0	5	0
This lists parties that won seats. See the complete results below.

Wagait Shire Council is composed of five councillors elected to a single ward.

=== Wagait results ===
2025 Northern Territory local elections: Wagait
Party	Candidate	Votes	%	±%
Independent	Sarah Manning (elected 1)	99	38.1	+38.1
Independent	Sarah Smith (elected 2)	55	21.2	+21.2
Independent	Tom Dyer (elected 3)	33	12.7	+4.3
Independent	Neil White (elected 4)	31	11.9	–5.4
Independent	Peter Clee (elected 5)	26	10.0	–2.4
Independent	Alan Amezdroz	16	6.2	+6.2
Total formal votes		260	98.9	+3.2
Informal votes		3	1.1	–3.2
Turnout		263	74.5	–4.1

== West Arnhem ==
2025 West Arnhem Regional Council election
← 2021	23 August 2025	2029 →
- All 5 seats on West Arnhem Regional Council
Party	Vote %	Seats	+/–
Independents	100.0	12	0
This lists parties that won seats. See the complete results below.

West Arnhem Regional Council is composed of five wards, totalling twelve councillors. Minjilang Ward and Warruwi Ward elect one member each, Gunbalanya Ward and Kakadu Ward elect three each, and Maningrida Ward elects four.

=== Gunbalanya ===
2025 Northern Territory local elections: Gunbalanya Ward
Party	Candidate	Votes	%	±%
Independent	Henry Yates (elected)	unopposed		
Independent	Ralph McCoy (elected)	unopposed		
Registered electors		1,039		

=== Kakadu ===
2025 Northern Territory local elections: Kakadu Ward
Party	Candidate	Votes	%	±%
Independent	Ralph Francis Blyth (elected)	unopposed		
Independent	Mickitja Onus (elected)	unopposed		
Registered electors		587		

=== Maningrida ===
2025 Northern Territory local elections: Maningrida Ward
Party	Candidate	Votes	%	±%
Independent	Jacqueline Phillips			
Independent	James Woods			
Independent	Jermaine Namanurki			
Independent	Joseph Diddo			
Independent	Monia Wilton			
Total formal votes				
Informal votes				
Turnout				

=== Minjilang ===
2025 Northern Territory local elections: Minjilang Ward
Party	Candidate	Votes	%	±%
Independent	Steven Nabalmarda (elected)	unopposed		
Registered electors		202		

=== Warruwi ===
2025 Northern Territory local elections: Warruwi Ward
Party	Candidate	Votes	%	±%
Independent	James Marrawal			
Independent	Jamie Milpurr			
Total formal votes				
Informal votes				
Turnout				

== West Daly ==
2025 West Daly Regional Council election
← 2021	23 August 2025	2029 →
- All 6 seats on West Daly Regional Council
Party	Vote %	Seats	+/–
Independents	100.0	6	0
This lists parties that won seats. See the complete results below.

West Daly Regional Council is composed of three wards, totalling six councillors. Thamarrurr/Pindi Pindi Ward elects four members, while Nganmarriyanga Ward and Tyemirri Ward elect one each.

=== Nganmarriyanga ===
2025 Northern Territory local elections: Nganmarriyanga Ward
Party	Candidate	Votes	%	±%
Independent	Gabriel Martin (elected)	unopposed		
Registered electors		260		

=== Thamarrurr/Pindi Pindi ===
2025 Northern Territory local elections: Thamarrurr/Pindi Pindi Ward
Party	Candidate	Votes	%	±%
Independent	Terry Sams			
Independent	Cyril Ninnal			
Independent	Basil Dumoo			
Independent	Vincent Jinjair			
Independent	Mark Tunmuck-Smith			
Independent	Joseph Thardim			
Independent	Jimmy Cartwright			
Independent	Adrian William Marshall			
Total formal votes				
Informal votes				
Turnout				

=== Tyemirri ===
2025 Northern Territory local elections: Tyemirri Ward
Party	Candidate	Votes	%	±%
Independent	Annunciata Nunuk Wilson			
Independent	John Wilson			
Total formal votes				
Informal votes				
Turnout				
