= 2021 Northern Territory local elections =

← 2017	28 August 2021	2025 →
- Registered: 139,105
- Turnout: 57.49%

The 2021 Northern Territory local elections were held on 28 August 2021 to elect the councils of the 17 local government areas (LGAs) in the Northern Territory, Australia. Six councils also held mayoral elections.

303 candidates contested the elections to fill a total of 159 council and mayoral positions. Two councils did not have enough nominations to fill all vacancies, causing supplementary elections to be held.

A record number of voters were on the electoral roll, with an increase of more than 5,000 people compared to the 2017 elections. More than 25,000 people voted at an early voting centre.

== Party changes before elections ==
A number of councillors joined or left parties before the 2021 elections.

Council	Ward	Councillor	Former party	New party	Date
Alice Springs	Unsubdivided	Eli Melky	Independent	Country	8 February 2019
Alice Springs	Unsubdivided	Marli Banks	Independent	Country	14 June 2019
Alice Springs	Unsubdivided	Catherine Satour	Independent	Country	14 June 2019
Alice Springs	Unsubdivided	Matt Paterson	Independent	Territory Alliance	11 May 2020
Alice Springs	Unsubdivided	Matt Paterson	Territory Alliance	Independent	Late 2020
Alice Springs	Unsubdivided	Eli Melky	Federation	Independent	20 August 2021

== Campaign ==
During the early voting period in mid-August, Darwin and Katherine were placed into a four-day lockdown because of a new COVID-19 case.

== Results ==
=== Mayoral elections ===
Mayors in italics did not recontest their positions.

Council	Before		Result after preference distribution			
Council	Mayor	Party	Party	Candidate	%	Result
Alice Springs	Damien Ryan	Independent CLP	Independent	Matt Paterson	50.01	Independent gain
Alice Springs	Damien Ryan	Independent CLP	Independent	Jimmy Cocking	49.99	Independent gain
Barkly	Steve Edgington	Independent CLP	Independent	Jeffrey McLaughlin	65.29	Independent gain
Barkly	Steve Edgington	Independent CLP	Independent	Hal Ruger	34.71	Independent gain
Darwin	Kon Vatskalis	Independent Labor	Ind. Labor	Kon Vatskalis	57.23	Independent Labor hold
Darwin	Kon Vatskalis	Independent Labor	Independent	Amye Un (Note: Second-placed on primary vote as the election did not require preference distribution.)	12.69	Independent Labor hold
Katherine	Fay Miller	Independent CLP	Independent	Lis Clark	53.89	Independent gain
Katherine	Fay Miller	Independent CLP	Independent	Kevin South	46.11	Independent gain
Litchfield	Maree Bredhauer	Independent	Independent	Doug Barden	54.68	Independent gain
Litchfield	Maree Bredhauer	Independent	Independent	Maree Bredhauer	45.32	Independent gain
Palmerston	Athina Pascoe-Bell	Independent	Independent	Athina Pascoe-Bell	73.99	Independent hold
Palmerston	Athina Pascoe-Bell	Independent	Independent	Ryan Pettifer	15.61	Independent hold

=== Council totals ===
Council	Seats			
Council	Independents	Ind. Labor	Independent CLP	Greens
Alice Springs	7	Did not contest	1	0
Barkly	10	Did not contest	Did not contest	1
Belyuen	5	Did not contest	Did not contest	Did not contest
Central Desert	4	Did not contest	Did not contest	Did not contest
Coomalie	4	Did not contest	Did not contest	Did not contest
Darwin	8	2	1	1
East Arnhem	6	Did not contest	Did not contest	Did not contest
Katherine	6	Did not contest	Did not contest	Did not contest
Litchfield	6	Did not contest	Did not contest	Did not contest
MacDonnell	6	Did not contest	Did not contest	Did not contest
Palmerston	7	Did not contest	Did not contest	Did not contest
Roper Gulf	11	Did not contest	Did not contest	Did not contest
Tiwi Islands	11	Did not contest	1	Did not contest
Victoria Daly	2	Did not contest	Did not contest	Did not contest
Wagait	5	Did not contest	Did not contest	Did not contest
West Arnhem	12	Did not contest	Did not contest	Did not contest
West Daly	5	Did not contest	Did not contest	Did not contest

== Aftermath ==
The Alice Springs mayoral election was decided by just two votes, the closest result that Northern Territory Electoral Commissioner Iain Loganathan said he had ever seen. Unsuccessful candidate Jimmy Cocking requested a new recount, but it was rejected by the Northern Territory Civil and Administrative Tribunal in October 2021.

== By-elections ==
Council	Ward	Before		Change		Result after preference distribution			
Council	Ward	Councillor	Party	Cause	Date	Date	Party	Candidate	%
Coomalie	Batchelor Township					20 November 2021	Independent	Richard Luxton	60.00
Coomalie	Batchelor Township					20 November 2021	Independent	Bill Baldwin (Note: Second-placed on primary vote as the by-election did not require preference distribution.)	26.15
Central Desert	Akityarre					10 February 2022	Independent	Rosslyn Campbell	N/A
Central Desert	Akityarre					10 February 2022	Elected unopposed		
West Daly	Nganmarriyanga					10 February 2022	Independent	Terry Sams	N/A
West Daly	Nganmarriyanga					10 February 2022	Elected unopposed		
East Arnhem	Gumurr Gattjirrk					17 February 2022	Independent	Joe Djakala	N/A
East Arnhem	Gumurr Gattjirrk					17 February 2022	Elected unopposed		
East Arnhem	Gumurr Miyarkka					17 February 2022	Independent	Wesley Bandi Bandi Wunungmurra	N/A
East Arnhem	Gumurr Miyarkka					17 February 2022	Elected unopposed		
Roper Gulf	Numbulwar Numburindi					17 February 2022	Independent	Kathy-Anne Numamurdirdi	N/A
Roper Gulf	Numbulwar Numburindi					17 February 2022	Elected unopposed		
East Arnhem	Gumurr Miwatj					7 July 2022	Independent	Marrpalawuy Marika (Note: Two vacancies on council, meaning two candidates were elected - this shows their primary vote before preference distribution.)	61.74
East Arnhem	Gumurr Miwatj					7 July 2022	Independent	Wesley Dhamarrandji	18.79
East Arnhem	Anindilyakwa					22 July 2022	Independent	Lionel Jaragba	N/A
East Arnhem	Anindilyakwa					22 July 2022	Elected unopposed		
East Arnhem	Gumurr Miyarkka					22 July 2022	Independent	Bobby Wunungmurra	N/A
East Arnhem	Gumurr Miyarkka					22 July 2022	Elected unopposed		
Darwin	Waters	Justine Glover	Independent	Resignation	3 May 2022	7 July 2022	Independent	Kim Farrar	51.20
Darwin	Waters	Justine Glover	Independent	Resignation	3 May 2022	7 July 2022	Independent CLP	Gary Haslett	24.45
Central Desert	Anmatjere					4 November 2022	No nominations received		
Alice Springs	Unsubdivided	Jimmy Cocking	Independent	Resignation	2022	29 October 2022	Independent	Gavin Morris	56.77
Alice Springs	Unsubdivided	Jimmy Cocking	Independent	Resignation	2022	29 October 2022	Independent CLP	Sean Heenan	43.23
West Arnhem	Gunbalanya					18 March 2023	Independent	Gabby Gumurdul	70.80
West Arnhem	Gunbalanya					18 March 2023	Independent	Owen Naborlhborlh	29.20
Barkly	Alyawarr					6 April 2023	Independent	Lucy Jackson	N/A
Barkly	Alyawarr					6 April 2023	Independent	Mark Peterson	N/A
Barkly	Alyawarr					6 April 2023	Elected unopposed (two vacancies)		
East Arnhem	Gumurr Miwatj					5 May 2023	Independent	Marrpalawuy Marika	76.90
East Arnhem	Gumurr Miwatj					5 May 2023	Independent	Ineke Wallis	23.10
Barkly	Patta					6 May 2023	Independent	Elliot McAdam	33.83
Barkly	Patta					6 May 2023	Independent	Sharon Lake	25.30
MacDonnell	Rodinga					19 May 2023	Independent	Andrew Davis	N/A
MacDonnell	Rodinga					19 May 2023	Independent	Aloyiscois Hayes	N/A
MacDonnell	Rodinga					19 May 2023	Elected unopposed (two vacancies)		
Central Desert	Anmatjere	N/A	N/A	No nominations received	4 November 2022	16 June 2023	Independent	David McCormack	N/A
Central Desert	Anmatjere	N/A	N/A	No nominations received	4 November 2022	16 June 2023	Elected unopposed		
Central Desert	Southern Tanami					16 June 2023	Independent	Warren Williams	N/A
Central Desert	Southern Tanami					16 June 2023	Elected unopposed		
MacDonnell	Luritja Pintubi					16 June 2023	Independent	Tommy Jabanardi Conway	58.90
MacDonnell	Luritja Pintubi					16 June 2023	Independent	Amos Egan	41.10
Belyuen	Unsubdivided					13 July 2023	No nominations received		
Katherine	Unsubdivided					15 July 2023	Independent	Kerrie Mott	27.39
Katherine	Unsubdivided					15 July 2023	Independent	Peter McDougall	27.28
Victoria Daly	Timber Creek					27 July 2023	Independent	Deborah Jones	N/A
Victoria Daly	Timber Creek					27 July 2023	Elected unopposed		
Tiwi Islands	Bathurst Island	Peter Kantilla	Independent	Resignation forced after not attending council meetings	22 February 2023	3 August 2023	Independent	John Ross Pilakui	N/A
Tiwi Islands	Bathurst Island	Peter Kantilla	Independent	Resignation forced after not attending council meetings	22 February 2023	3 August 2023	Elected unopposed		
Roper Gulf	Never Never					1 September 2023	No nominations received		
Darwin	Lyons	Paul Arnold	Independent	Resignation	3 May 2023	2 September 2023	Independent	Sam Weston	53.03
Darwin	Lyons	Paul Arnold	Independent	Resignation	3 May 2023	2 September 2023	Greens	Suki Dorras-Walker	46.97
West Arnhem	Kakadu					9 September 2023	Independent	Mickitja Onus	61.00
West Arnhem	Kakadu					9 September 2023	Independent	Charlotte Meneer	39.00
Tiwi Islands	Bathurst Island					28 September 2023	Independent	Deanne Rioli	N/A
Tiwi Islands	Bathurst Island					28 September 2023	Elected unopposed		
Roper Gulf	Never Never	N/A	N/A	No nominations received	4 November 2022	9 September 2023	Independent	Edna Prescilla Iles	56.93
Roper Gulf	Never Never	N/A	N/A	No nominations received	4 November 2022	9 September 2023	Independent	Cecilia Lake	43.07

== See also ==
- 2021 Darwin City Council election
- 2021 Alice Springs Town Council election
