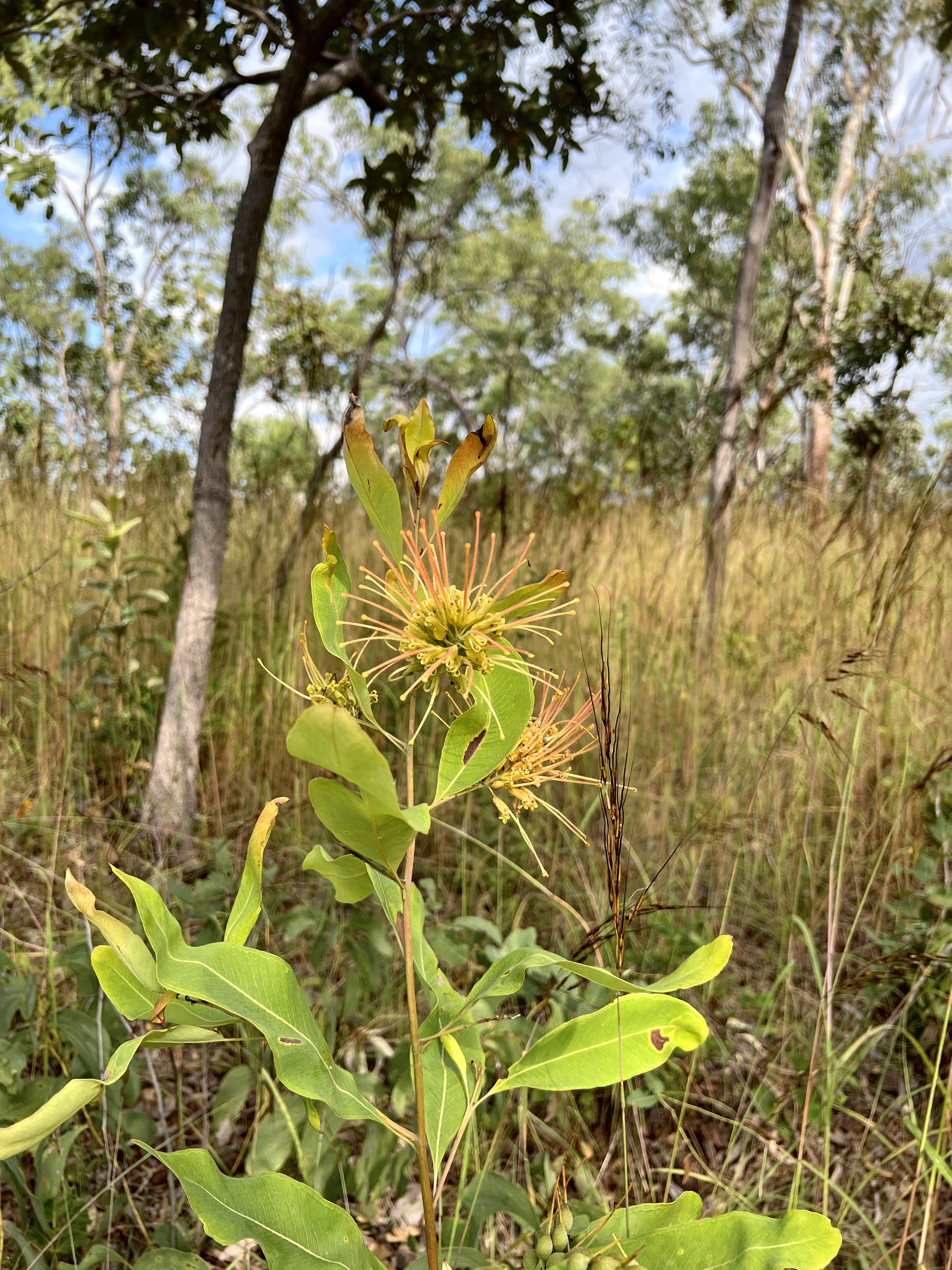
- In Litchfield National Park

Scientific classification
- Kingdom: Plantae
- Clade: Tracheophytes
- Clade: Angiosperms
- Clade: Eudicots
- Order: Proteales
- Family: Proteaceae
- Genus: Grevillea
- Species: G. pluricaulis

Binomial name
- Grevillea pluricaulis (McGill.) Olde & Marriott

Synonyms
- Grevillea goodii subsp. pluricaulis McGill.

= Grevillea pluricaulis =

Species of plant endemic to Australia

Grevillea pluricaulis is a species of flowering plant in the family Proteaceae and is endemic the Northern Territory in Australia. It is an erect shrub with elliptic leaves, the edges wavy, and light green to apricot-coloured or creamy brown flowers with a pale orange-apricot to pink style.

== Description ==
Grevillea pluricaulis is a shrub that typically grows to a height of 0.7–3 m (2 ft 4 in – 9 ft 10 in) and has several erect stems arising from a lignotuber. Its leaves are usually elliptic, sometimes narrowly so, 150–200 mm (5.9–7.9 in) long and 45–85 mm (1.8–3.3 in) wide. The edges of the leaves are wavy, the lower surface with hairs flattened against the surface. The flowers are arranged in leaf axils on one side of a rachis 50–100 mm (2.0–3.9 in) long and are light green to apricot-coloured or creamy brown, the pistil 40–55 mm (1.6–2.2 in) long, the style pale orange-apricot to pink. Flowering mainly occurs from April to October and the fruit is a woolly-hairy, oblong to more or less spherical follicle about 15 mm (0.59 in) long.

== Taxonomy ==
This grevillea was first formally described in 1986 by Donald McGillivray who gave it the name Grevillea goodii subsp. pluricaulis in his New Names in Grevillea (Proteaceae), from specimens collected in 1973 near the Finniss River Crossing by Clyde Dunlop. In 1994, Peter Olde and Neil Marriott raised the subspecies to species status as Grevillea pluricaulis. The specific epithet (pluricaulis) means "several stems".

== Distribution and habitat ==
Grevillea pluricaulis occurs in the tropical Top End of the Northern Territory, from Delissaville to the Finniss River, Port Keats and the Newcastle Range, as well as on Melville Island. It grows in open mixed eucalypt forest or shrubland on sandy or lateritic soils.
