= 2021 Darwin City Council election =

Election of lord mayor and 12 councillors to the City of Darwin

- 28 August 2021

All 13 seats on the City of Darwin 7 seats needed for a majority
- Registered: 51,060 (▲1.9)
- Lord Mayor
- Turnout: 66.5%
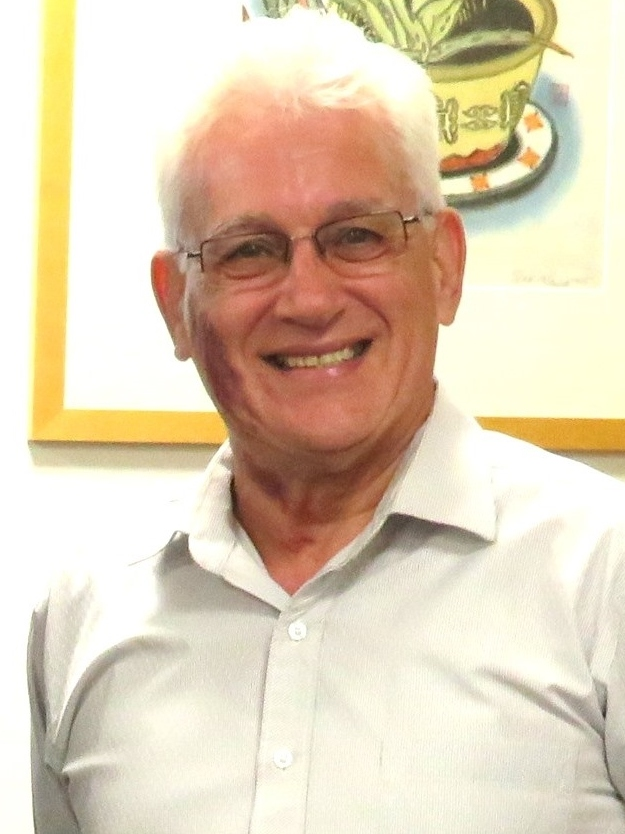
	First party	Second party	Third party
		IND	IND
Candidate	Kon Vatskalis	Amye Un	Leah Potter
Party	Independent	Independent	Ind. Progressives
Primary vote	18,411	4,083	3,964
Percentage	57.2%	12.7%	12.3%
Lord Mayor before election
Kon Vatskalis
Independent
Elected Lord Mayor
Kon Vatskalis
Independent
- Councillors
- Turnout: 66.5% (▼0.8)
Party	Vote %	Seats	+/–
Independents	53.7	5	
Ind. Labor	27.6	4	
Independent CLP	13.3	2	
Greens	5.8	1	
This lists parties that won seats. See the complete results below.

The 2021 Darwin City Council election was held on 28 August 2021 to elect a lord mayor and twelve councillors to the City of Darwin. The election was held as part of the local government elections held throughout the Northern Territory.

== Results ==
=== Lord Mayor ===
2021 Northern Territory mayoral elections: Darwin
Party	Candidate	Votes	%	±%
Independent	Kon Vatskalis	18,411	57.2	
Independent	Amye Un	4,083	12.7	
Ind. Progressives	Leah Potter	3,964	12.3	
Independent CLP	Gary Haslett	3,192	9.9	
Independent	Robin Lawrence	2,066	6.4	
Independent	Calvin Donaldson	456	1.4	
Total formal votes		32,172	94.8	
Informal votes		1,770	5.2	
Turnout		33,942	66.5	
Kon Vatskalis hold				

=== Councillors ===
2021 Northern Territory local elections: Darwin
Party	Votes	%	Swing	Seats	Change
Independents	17,256	53.7		5	
Independent Labor	8,874	27.6		4	
Independent CLP	4,285	13.3		2	
Greens	1,724	5.8		1	
Total	32,139	100.0	–	12	Steady
Informal votes	1,803	5.3			
Turnout	33,942	66.5	−0.8		
Enrolled voters	51,060		+1.9		

=== Chan ===
2021 Northern Territory local elections: Chan Ward
Party	Candidate	Votes	%	±%
Independent	Peter Pangquee (elected 1)	1,889	24.1	
Greens	Morgan Rickard (elected 2)	1,873	23.9	
Independent Labor	Ed Smelt (elected 3)	1,724	22.0	
Independent	Sally Gearin	1,587	20.3	
Independent	Jeff Borella	763	9.7	
Total formal votes		7,836	94.8	
Informal votes		427	5.2	
Turnout		8,263	65.9	

=== Lyons ===
2021 Northern Territory local elections: Lyons Ward
Party	Candidate	Votes	%	±%
Independent	Paul Arnold (elected 1)	1,929	25.1	
Independent CLP	Mick Palmer (elected 2)	1,515	19.8	
Independent	Amye Un (elected 3)	1,134	14.8	
Independent	Adam Troyn	1,116	14.6	
Independent	Carol Phayer	745	9.7	
Independent	Andrew Lee	712	9.3	
Independent	Sue Shearer	423	5.5	
Independent	Calvin Donaldson	96	1.3	
Total formal votes		7,670	94.7	
Informal votes		425	5.3	
Turnout		8,095	61.5	

=== Richardson ===
2021 Northern Territory local elections: Richardson Ward
Party	Candidate	Votes	%	±%
Independent Labor	Jimmy Bouhoris (elected 1)	2,879	33.2	
Independent Labor	Rebecca Want de Rowe (elected 2)	2,320	26.7	
Independent Labor	Vim Sharma (elected 3)	1,353	15.6	
Independent	Edwin Joseph	959	11.1	
Independent Labor	Rajeev Thayil	598	6.9	
Independent	Martine Smith	565	6.5	
Total formal votes		8,674	94.9	
Informal votes		468	5.1	
Turnout		9,142	73.0	

=== Waters ===
2021 Northern Territory local elections: Waters Ward
Party	Candidate	Votes	%	±%
Independent	Sylvia Klonaris (elected 1)	2,141	26.9	
Independent CLP	Brian O'Gallagher (elected 2)	2,056	25.8	
Independent	Justine Glover (elected 3)	1,760	22.1	
Independent CLP	Gary Haslett	714	9.0	
Independent	Andrew John Arthur	677	8.5	
Independent	Robin Lawrence	611	7.7	
Total formal votes		7,959	94.3	
Informal votes		483	5.7	
Turnout		8,442	65.8	
