= Gearin =

- Pronunciation: /ˈɡɪərɪn/
- Language: Gaelic, Irish

Origin
- Meaning: Generally derived from Ó Gearáin meaning Sharp, or Guerin which likely has multiple Gaelic and Anglo-Norman etymologies.
- Region of origin: Ireland and England

Other names
- Related names: Guerin and Gearing

Gearin, with variant forms Guerin and Gearon, is a surname of Irish origin that has phonetically similar cognates in most Western European languages. The widespread nature of these cognates may have contributed to the large number of spelling variations of the Gearin surname prior to the standardization of English spelling in Ireland.

People with the name Gearin include:

- Dinty Gearin (1897–1959), American baseball player
- John M. Gearin (1851–1930), American politician and attorney
- Lawrence Gearin (died 1900), Newfoundland politician
- Sally Gearin (born 1949), Australian lawyer
- Steve Gearin (born 1958), Australian former rugby league footballer

== See also ==
- Cory Gearrin (born 1986), American former baseball player
