= Hibbertia praestans =

Scientific classification
- Kingdom: Plantae
- Clade: Tracheophytes
- Clade: Angiosperms
- Clade: Eudicots
- Order: Dilleniales
- Family: Dilleniaceae
- Genus: Hibbertia
- Species: H. praestans

Binomial name
- Hibbertia praestans (Craven & Dunlop) J.W.Horn

Species of plant

Hibbertia praestans is a species of flowering plant in the family Dilleniaceae and is endemic to northern parts of the Northern Territory. It is a small, broom-like shrub with red flowers arranged singly or in pairs in leaf axils with four stamens and a single carpel.

== Description ==
Hibbertia praestans is a small, much-branched, broom-like shrub that typically grows to a height of 1.5–2 m (4 ft 11 in – 6 ft 7 in) and has pendulous, often flattened branchlets. The flowers are arranged singly or in pairs in leaf axils, with up to three narrowly club-shaped bracts 3.5–17 mm (0.14–0.67 in) long at the base. The five sepals are joined at the base with two lobes 2.5–3.0 mm (0.098–0.118 in) long and three that are 3.2–5.0 mm (0.13–0.20 in) long. The five petals are elliptic, red, and 3–4 mm (0.12–0.16 in) long and each flower has four stamens and a single carpel. Flowering occurs from December to August.

== Taxonomy ==
This species of Hibbertia was first formally described in 1992 by Lyndley Craven and Clyde Robert Dunlop who gave it the name Pachynema praestans in Australian Systematic Botany, from specimens Craven collected near Jabiru in 1973. In 2009, James W. Horn changed the name to Hibbertia praestans. The specific epithet (praestans) means "pre-eminent" or "superior".

== Distribution and habitat ==
This hibbertia grows in sandstone crevices or in open forest on scree slopes in northern parts of the Northern Territory.

== Conservation status ==
Hibbertia praestans is classified as of "least concern" under the Territory Parks and Wildlife Conservation Act 1976.

== See also ==
- List of Hibbertia species
