= 2021 Alice Springs Town Council election =

← 2017	28 August 2021	2025 →

All 9 seats on the Alice Springs Town Council
- Registered: 15,756 (▲9.9)
- Mayor
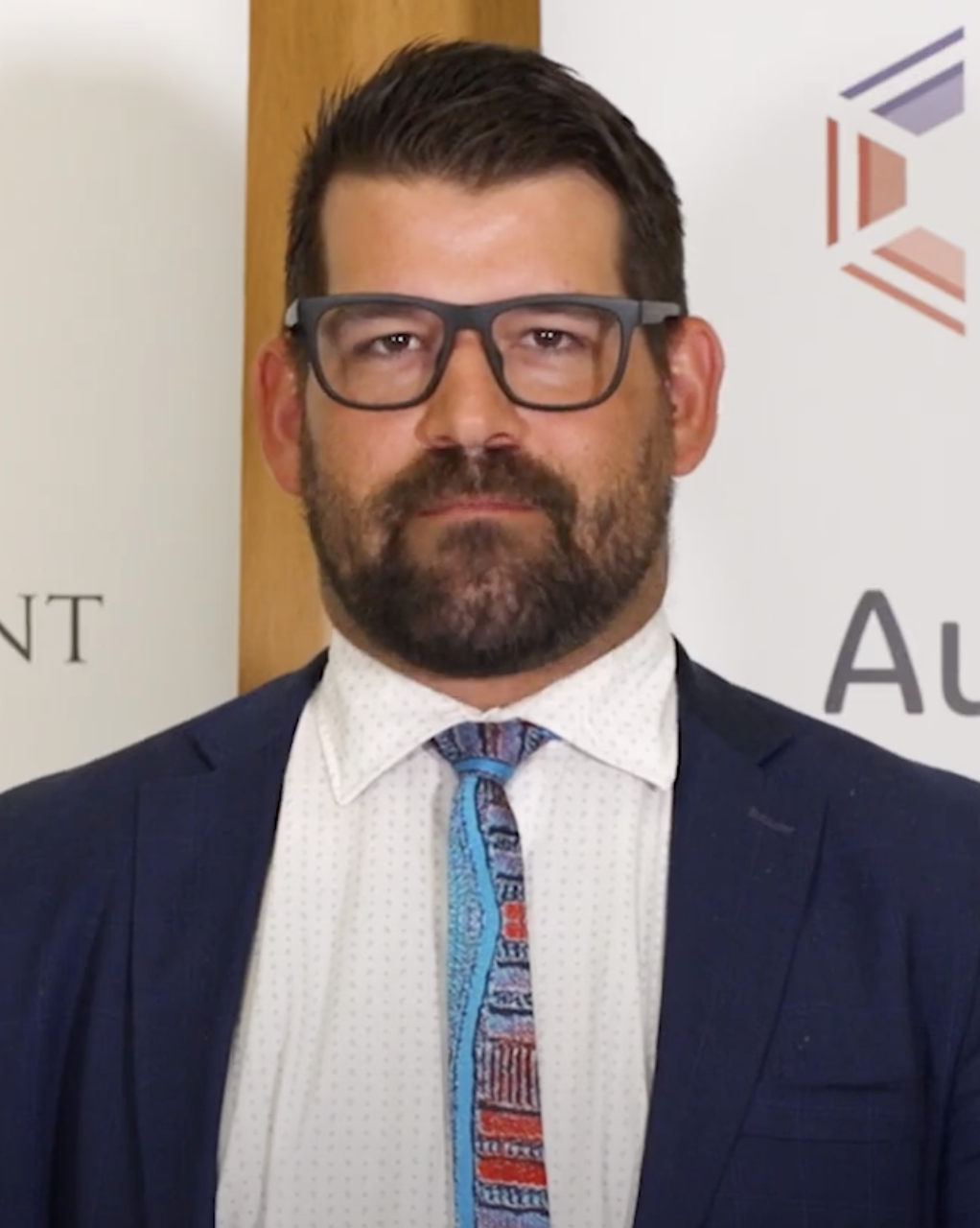
	First party	Second party	Third party
	IND		IND
Candidate	Jimmy Cocking	Matt Paterson	Eli Melky
Party	Independent	Independent	Independent
Percentage	33.73%	24.71%	20.02%
TCP	49.99%	50.01%
TCP swing	▲15.31	▲50.01
Mayor before election
Damien Ryan
Independent CLP
Elected Mayor
Matt Paterson
Independent
Party	Vote %	Seats	+/–
Independents	82.2	6	−1
Independent Country Liberal	8.9	1	0
Independent Labor	4.2	1	+1
Greens	4.7	0	0
This lists parties that won seats. See the complete results below.

The 2021 Alice Springs Town Council election were held on 28 August 2021 to elect a mayor and eight councillors to the Town of Alice Springs. The election was held as part of the local government elections held throughout the Northern Territory.

Matt Paterson was elected mayor with a two-candidate-preferred margin of just two votes. It was the closest-ever result in an election conducted by the Northern Territory Electoral Commission (NTEC).

== Background ==
Ahead of the 2020 Northern Territory general election, three Alice Springs councillors - Marli Banks, Eli Melky and Catherine Satour - joined the Australian Federation Party, with Melky as the party's NT leader. However, all three left the party by the time of the 2021 local elections.

Additionally, Matt Paterson was a Territory Alliance candidate, however he left the party around the time it dissolved following the 2020 election.

== Results ==
=== Mayor ===
2021 Northern Territory mayoral elections: Alice Springs
Party	Candidate	Votes	%	±%
Independent	Jimmy Cocking	3,101	31.7	−3.0
Independent	Matt Paterson	2,418	24.7	+24.7
Independent	Eli Melky	1,959	20.0	+20.0
Independent	Marli Banks	695	7.1	+7.1
Independent CLP	Steve Brown	559	5.7	+5.7
Independent	Blair McFarland	356	3.6	+3.6
Independent	Aaron Blacker	346	3.5	+3.5
Independent	Patrick Bedford	240	2.5	+2.5
Independent	Wayne Wright	63	0.6	+0.6
Independent	Angus McIvor	49	0.5	+0.5
Total formal votes		9,786	95.6	−4.1
Informal votes		454	4.4	+4.1
Turnout		10,240	65.0	−3.9
Two-candidate-preferred result
Independent	Matt Paterson	4,894	50.01	+50.01
Independent	Jimmy Cocking	4,892	49.99	+15.31
Matt Paterson gain from Independent CLP				

=== Councillors ===
2021 Northern Territory local elections: Alice Springs
Party	Candidate	Votes	%	±%
Independent	Jimmy Cocking (elected 1)	2,595	28.1	+12.0
Independent	Eli Melky (elected 2)	1,366	14.8	+6.0
Independent	Mark Coffey (elected 3)	1,089	11.8	+11.8
Independent	Marli Banks (elected 4)	487	5.3	+2.1
Independent CLP	Steve Brown (elected 5)	473	5.1	+5.1
Greens	Emily Webster	436	4.7	+4.7
Independent	Michael Liddle (elected 8)	425	4.6	+4.6
Independent Labor	Allison Bitar (elected 7)	385	4.2	+4.2
Independent	Kim Hopper (elected 6)	372	4.0	+4.0
Independent CLP	Sean Heenan	347	3.8	+3.8
Independent	Aaron Blacker	336	3.6	+3.6
Independent	Catherine Satour	326	3.5	+0.9
Independent	Darren Burton	240	2.6	+2.6
Independent	Patrick Bedford	229	2.5	+2.5
Independent	James Dash	48	0.5	+0.5
Independent	Wayne Wright	48	0.5	+0.5
Independent	Angus McIvor	44	0.5	+0.5
Total formal votes		9,246	90.1	+1.8
Informal votes		1,015	9.9	−1.8
Turnout		10,261	58.68	−12.32

== Aftermath ==
The mayoral election was decided by just two votes, the closest result that Northern Territory Electoral Commissioner Iain Loganathan said he had ever seen.

Unsuccessful candidate Jimmy Cocking requested a new recount, but it was rejected by the Northern Territory Civil and Administrative Tribunal in October 2021.
