= Buntine =

Buntine may refer to:

- Buntine, Western Australia, town in Western Australia
- Buntine Highway, highway in the Northern Territory and Western Australia
- The Buntine Oration held by the Australian College of Educators

== People with the surname ==
- Agnes Buntine (c. 1822-1896), Scottish pastoralist and bullocky
- Arnold Buntine (1898–1975), Australian rules footballer and headmaster
- Hugh Buntine (1895–1970), Australian rugby union player
- Gladys "Jim" Buntine (1901–1992), Australian Chief Commissioner of Girl Guides
- Matthew Buntine (born 1993), Australian rules footballer
