= 2012 Northern Territory local elections =

← 2008	24 March 2012	2017 →

The 2012 Northern Territory local elections were held on 24 March 2012 to elect the councils of all 17 local government areas (LGAs) in the Northern Territory.

Voting was compulsory for any person who is on the Northern Territory electoral roll in an address that is within a council area.

Like the territory's general elections, the local elections were conducted by the Northern Territory Electoral Commission (NTEC).
