= Town of Jabiru =

- Local government area
- Coordinates: 12°40′S 132°50′E
- Country: Australia
- State: Northern Territory
- Region: Arnhem Land
- Established: 1984
- Council seat: Jabiru

Government
  - Mayor: Ian Newnham
  - Territory electorate: Arafura
  - Federal division: Lingiari

Area
  - Total: 13.5 km^{2} (5.2 sq mi)

Population
  - Total: 755 (2021)
  - Density: 55.93/km^{2} (144.8/sq mi)
- Postcode: 0886
- Website: Town of Jabiru

The Town of Jabiru was a local government area of the Northern Territory of Australia, and was based in Jabiru. The town covered an area of 13.5 square kilometres (5.2 sq mi) and had a population of about 755.

On 1 July 2008, it became part of the new West Arnhem LGA.

== Overnance ==
The town's municipal services were provided by the Town of Jabiru, which was incorporated on 2 July 1985 by an amendment to the Act, requested by the Jabiru Town Development Authority.

The first Council meeting was held in July 1985, and every two years an election was held (unlike the rest of the Northern Territory, where councils were elected every five years).

On 2 July 2008, the Town and the special arrangements ceased to exist and Jabiru became part of the West Arnhem LGA.
