= Hugh Buntine =

Australian rugby union player

- Born: Hugh Lachlan Murray Buntine; 18 March 1895 Port Macquarie, New South Wales
- Died: 2 April 1971 Manly, New South Wales
- School: The Scots College - Sydney

Rugby union career
- Position: centre
International career
Years	Team	Apps	(Points)
1924	Wallabies	1	(0)

Hugh Murray Buntine (18 March 1895 – 2 April 1971) was a rugby union player who represented Australia.

Buntine, a centre, was born in Port Macquarie, New South Wales and claimed 1 international rugby cap for Australia.
