= 2017 Northern Territory local elections =

← 2012	26 August 2017	2021 →
- Registered: 133,927

The 2017 Northern Territory local elections were held on 26 August 2017 to elect the councils of 16 of the 17 local government areas (LGAs) in the Northern Territory, Australia. Several councils also held mayoral elections.

The elections were initially scheduled to be held in March 2016, but it was announced on 27 March 2015 that they would be delayed to avoid clashing with the 2016 NT general election.

320 candidates contested the elections to fill a total of 157 council and mayoral positions.

The election in Palmerston was deferred until 17 March 2018 after the council was suspended (and later sacked), then deferred again until 24 March due to weather warnings in the area as a result of Tropical Cyclone Marcus impacting the region.

== Party changes before elections ==
A number of councillors joined or left parties before the 2021 elections.

Council	Ward	Councillor	Former party	New party	Date
Alice Springs	Unsubdivided	Eli Melky	Country Liberal	Palmer United	29 April 2014
Alice Springs	Unsubdivided	Eli Melky	Palmer United	Independent	2016
