= Agnes Buntine =

(1822–1896) pastoralist and bullocky

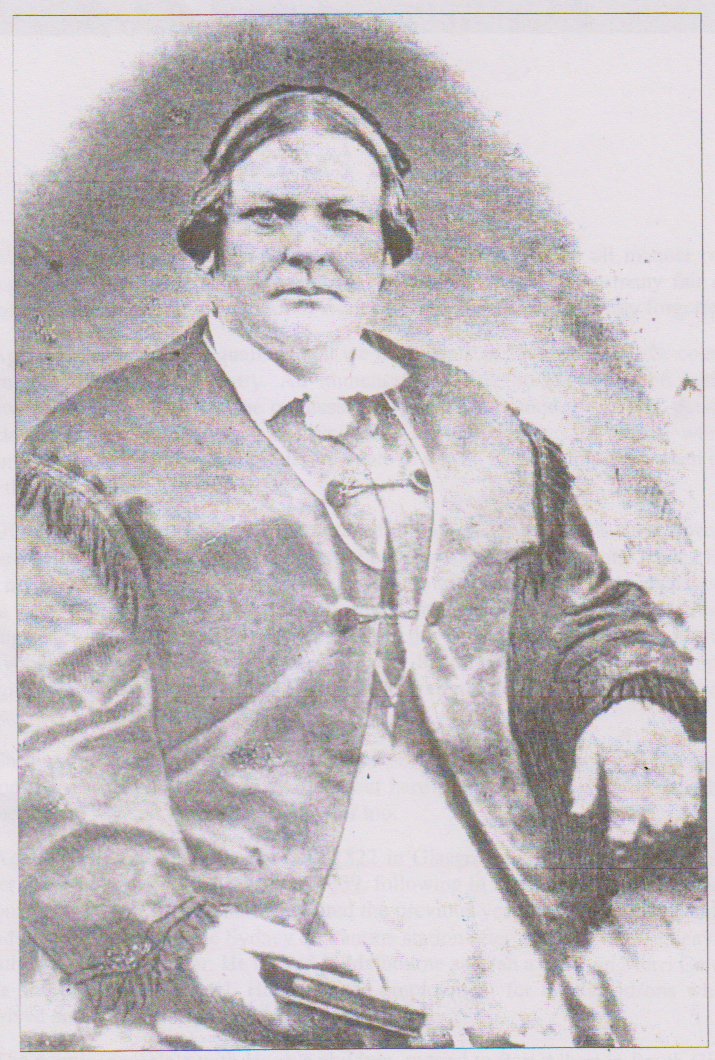
- Born: Agnes Davidson c. 1822; Glasgow, Scotland
- Died: 29 February 1896 (aged 73–74); Sale, Victoria, Australia
- Occupations: Pastoralist and bullocky
- Years active: 1840s/50s – 1873

Agnes Buntine (c. 1822 – 29 February 1896) was a Scottish pastoralist and bullocky. Born in Glasgow, Scotland as Agnes Davidson, she and her family moved to Australia in 1840. She became a bullocky there, frequently making trips across different cities to transport merchandise, and opening two stores. When working as a bullocky, she wore thick clothing and boots, unlike the clothing of most women at the time, which saved her life when she was caught in a large bush fire. She was the first person to transport supplies to Walhalla, Victoria when gold was discovered there. She retired in 1873 and died in 1896.

== Early life ==
Buntine was born in Glasgow, Scotland, in about 1822. Her parents were Sarah and John Davidson, the latter a crofter; Buntine was the oldest of the six children they had. The Davidsons travelled to Glen Huntly, Melbourne, Victoria, Australia in late 1839, arriving in April 1840. It is likely that the family departed from Scotland due to Hugh Buntine's advocacy for the idea. Hugh, a brick and tile maker, had lived at Ayrshire with his wife Mary and five children since 1838 and was a neighbour to the Davidson family, but moved to Melbourne after Mary and one of the couple's children died of typhoid fever in North Head Quarantine Station, Sydney, New South Wales.

Buntine became a dairymaid in Glen Huntly. On 30 October 1840, she married Hugh, and the couple initiated a dairy farm at Merri Creek. In July 1842, they constructed a house in Gippsland close to Port Albert and had a son named Albert. Albert is believed to have been the first white child in Gippsland, causing Buntine to be known as "the White Mother of the Gippsland district". From 1843 to 1855, the couple had five more children. They managed an inn at Morris Creek, near Tarraville. By 1845, the couple established a station at Bruthen Creek by 1845, also located near Tarraville, which covered nearly 8,000 acres (3,200 ha) of land. Another inn, the Bush Inn, located on the road to Sale, Victoria, was established by Hugh to increase the family's income.

== Bullocky career ==
To support her family, Buntine became the first female bullocky in Australia. She journeyed from her home near Port Albert to Forest Creek in 1851, travelling across multiple mountains, to transport butter and cheese. She opened multiple stores, including one at Bendigo, Victoria, and one at the Shire of McIvor. In 1853, after having established those, she travelled back to Bruthen Creek. Her family moved to Flynns Creek in 1858 and owned a farm there. By this time, Hugh had fallen ill, so the family was supported solely by the money produced from Agnes' work as a bullocky. The longest trips she executed were from Melbourne to various parts of Gippsland.

During one of her journeys, Buntine experienced a large bush fire. She was able to find a safe patch of ground to stay at until the fire ended, and although she received severe burns from the incident, she survived due to her thick clothing and boots. In 1862, Buntine travelled to Walhalla, Victoria, after gold was first discovered there and became the first to transport supplies to the town after the finding of the gold. The path to Walhalla was difficult to travel and covered at least 80 miles, taking eight days to complete at minimum. A day after arriving, she killed a steer to use as food for the gold miners.

As a bullocky, Buntine was described as a "steam boiler on horseback" and according to The Herald she had "strong, heavy-set, almost masculine features, her clear, intense eyes being her most marked attribute". During her journeys she wore thick clothing, boots, and a hat, in contrast to most women at the time, who typically wore "crinolines, bonnets, and shawls". Buntine also had two pistols contained in her belt and according to a man who knew Buntine, she smoked an "old black pipe".

== Retirement and death ==
After Hugh died, Agnes continued her involvement in the bullocky business until her retirement in Sale, Victoria, Australia. On 17 February 1873, she remarried to Michael Dawe Hallett, an English farmer who was aged 29 at the time of their marriage. From this time until her death, she lived at Flynns Creek and farmed there with her new husband. She died in Gippsland Hospital, Sale on 29 February 1896. Three daughters and one son of Buntine were alive when she died. Several of her children became landowners in the area and her grandson, William Buntine, became a writer and an actor. She was buried in the cemetery of Rosedale, Victoria, which was also where Hugh had been buried.
