= Damien Ryan (politician) =

Australian politician (born 1955)

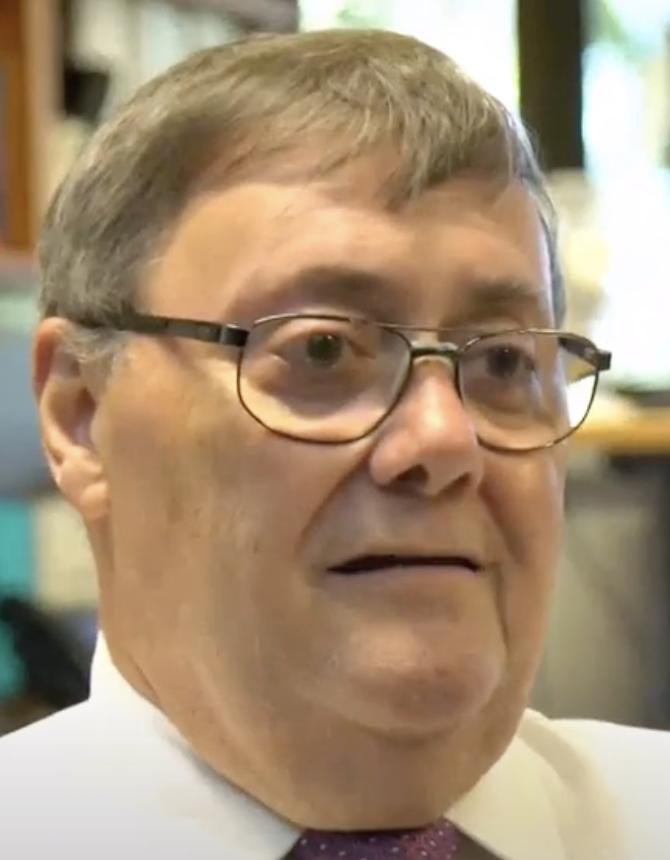

Mayor of Alice Springs
- In office 30 March 2008 – 14 September 2021 office vacant 7 Aug – 7 Sep 2020
- Preceded by: Fran Kilgariff
- Succeeded by: Matt Paterson

Personal details
- Born: Damien Ryan; 8 September 1955
- Party: Country Liberal

Damien Ryan (born 8 September 1955) is an Australian politician and the longest-serving Mayor of Alice Springs.

Ryan has served in a variety of public positions and on boards for many Central Australian government and non-government organisations. He has run for both the Territory and Federal parliaments as a candidate for the Country Liberal Party and is a public figure in Alice Springs.

== Early life and career ==
Damien Ryan opened a camera and photography shop in Alice Springs in 1971 which he owned and, for many years, operated until 2008, when he sold the business following his election as Mayor.

Ryan spent multiple years operating remote roadhouses, first at the historic Mt Ebenezer Roadhouse on the Lasster Highway and then at the Dunmurra Wayside Inn on the Stuart Highway.

He has also had a long-standing relationship with the Finke Desert Race, serving as the inaugural President of the Organising Committee. He is now an Honorary Life Member of the Finke Desert Race.

In 2008 he was appointed as the Northern Territory Grants Commissioner for the Northern Territory Grants Commission, a role he kept until 2019.

He served as the Chair of the Alice Springs Alcohol Reference Group from 2014 to 2020, a particularly challenging role considering the Northern Territory Emergency Intervention, which he supported.

In 2013 Ryan was appointed by the relatively new Chief Minister Adam Giles as the Chair of the Central Australian Health Service, a role he maintained until 2017.

In 2015 he was appointed as the Chair of the Alice Springs Masters Games.

== Political career ==
=== Mayor of Alice Springs ===
Ryan was first elected as the Mayor of Alice Springs at the 2008 Northern Territory Local Government Elections, where he gained 67% of the two-party-preferred vote. He was subsequently re-elected in 2012 and for a third term in 2017. He briefly resigned as Mayor in 2020 to run as the CLP candidate for Araluen.

He did not seek re-election in 2021 as he had been preselected as the CLP candidate for Lingiari for the following year's election. In his final term as Mayor, fellow Country Liberal Party member (and future Senator) Jacinta Nampijinpa Price was elected to serve as his deputy.

Ryan served as the President of the Local Government Association of the Northern Territory (LGANT) for a number of years between 2012 and 2020. Moreover, he was also elected as the Vice President of the Australian Local Government Association from 2016 to 2018.

=== Territory and federal politics ===
Ryan was the Country Liberal Party (CLP) candidate for the Northern Territory Legislative Assembly Division of Araluen in the 2020 Northern Territory election, where he was defeated by incumbent MLA and former CLP member Robyn Lambley.

He again ran as a CLP candidate in the 2022 Australian federal election for the Federal Division of Lingiari, a seat which covers almost the entire Northern Territory except for the city of Darwin, but was unsuccessful.

== Personal life ==
Carmel, Ryan's mother, moved to the Northern Territory on New Years Day 1950, seeking "an adventure", after reading We of the Never Never in her high-school studies. Also in 1948, Ryan's father John moved to Tennant Creek, where he eventually met his mother.

John Ryan's sister Mary married Peter McCracken, who owned and ran Elsey Station which is the basis for the novel We of the Never Never, thus connecting his family to the novel through marriage and many family holidays and visits spent on the famous station.

John Ryan went on to build a trucking business with Noel Buntine of the Buntine family, a pioneer of the roadtrain industry in Australia.

Ryan is a Catholic. Along with his three brothers, he attended the Catholic Boarding and Day School Rostrevor in Adelaide.

Ryan is married to Joanne, with whom he has three daughters and two grandchildren. Ryan's son-in-law is Joshua Burgoyne, CLP member of the Legislative Assembly for the Alice Springs electorate of Braitling.
