= Jabiru, Northern Territory =

Town in Australia

Jabiru
- Town
- Coordinates: 12°40′S 132°50′E
- Country: Australia
- State: Northern Territory
- LGA: West Arnhem Region
- Location: 256 km (159 mi) from Darwin

Government
  - Territory electorate: Arafura
  - Federal division: Lingiari
- Elevation: 27 m (89 ft)

Population
  - Total: 1,081 (2016 census)
- Postcode: 0886
- Mean max temp: 34.2 °C (93.6 °F)
- Mean min temp: 22.6 °C (72.7 °F)
- Annual rainfall: 1,586.2 mm (62.45 in)

Jabiru is a town in the Northern Territory of Australia. Built in 1982, the town is completely surrounded by Kakadu National Park. At the 2016 census, Jabiru had a population of 1,081. It is named after the black-necked stork often seen in the wetlands and billabongs of Kakadu, which is commonly referred to in Australia as a jabiru.

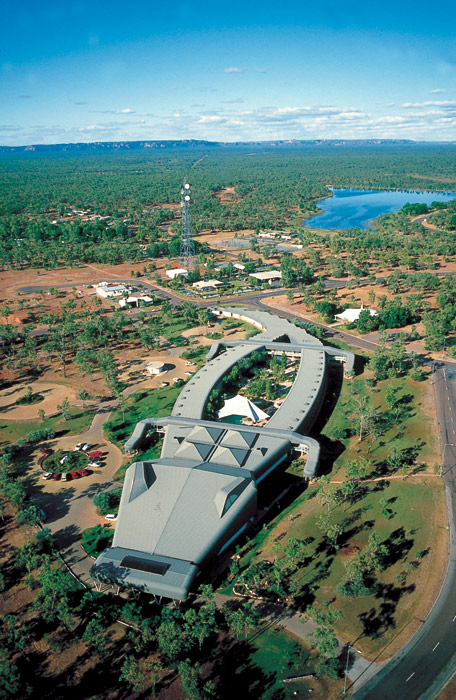
Crocodile Hotel at Kakadu

== History and governance ==
A township in the Alligator Rivers region of Arnhem Land was first proposed in the early 1970s to support a rapid growth in tourism following the construction of the Arnhem Highway. A view expressed by some witnesses before the Ranger Uranium Environmental Inquiry was that the development of the Ranger Uranium Mine and its supporting infrastructure would also support growth in the tourism industry. A new town could be established as a regional service centre, providing both homes for workers at the mine and tourist accommodation for visitors to the proposed Kakadu National Park.

The township of Jabiru began construction in 1982, after a 13 square kilometres (5.0 sq mi) area was leased to the Jabiru Town Development Authority (JTDA) in 1981 by the Director of National Parks and Wildlife. Under this agreement, the JTDA controlled development through subleases to the operators of the Ranger Uranium mine, government agencies and private business. Under the conditions of the lease, the town was only to allow permanent residents who were associated with the operation of the mine, government agencies or essential services. The population was not to exceed 3500. These conditions were intended to protect the world heritage site by minimising the footprint of urban development.

The second management plan for the Kakadu National Park in 1986 permitted expansion of the town's role as a tourism service centre, with the development of accommodation and tourism businesses subject to agreement by the traditional land owners and Northern Land Council. The first such development was the Gagudju Crocodile Hotel, opened in 1988.

The JTDA delegated local government responsibility to the Jabiru Town Council. The Northern Territory Government amalgamated Jabiru Town Council and the West Arnhem Shire (Region) in 2008. Jabiru town services are administered by the West Arnhem Regional Council, whose council chambers are in the town plaza.

The Mirrar clan were recognised as the traditional title holders of Jabiru township in November 2018, but a dispute over the native title was drawn out for years. Following the closure of the mine and expiry of the lease, the town was formally handed over to the Mirrar people on 16 June 2021 by the federal Minister for the Environment, Sussan Ley, and the Minister for Indigenous Australians, Ken Wyatt, with settlement date fixed at 30 June.

== Population ==
According to the 2016 census of Population, there were 1,081 people in Jabiru.

- Aboriginal and Torres Strait Islander people made up 24.3% of the population.
- 68.6% of people were born in Australia.
- 64.9% of people only spoke English at home.
- The most common response for religion was "no religion", at 36.8%.

== Description and facilities ==
Apart from the Ranger mine, Jabiru's most notable industries are tourism, being the commercial and accommodation hub of Kakadu National Park, and Aboriginal arts and culture. Jabiru features a small town plaza that includes government offices, magistrate's court and emergency services.

Recreational facilities include the Jabiru town lake (picnic areas and barbecues), freshwater fishing for barramundi (a local specialty), the Yellow Water cruise, day-trips to Ubirr Rock, Twin Falls and other natural features of Kakadu National Park.

There is a sports and social club, an Olympic-size swimming pool (the only place guaranteed safe from crocodiles to swim), cricket ovals where cricket and Australian rules football are played. Magela Field in Jabiru is home to the Jabiru Bushratz RUFC. There is also a 9-hole golf course which is the only licensed premises for takeaway alcohol; however only members can buy takeaway alcohol there. Visitors can consume alcohol in opened containers on licensed premises.

West Arnhem Regional Council, with the support of Library & Archives NT, delivers public library and information services in Jabiru, which are free to all residents of the region, with options also being available to short-term residents and visitors. The library aims to provide a culture-rich environment with a focus on collecting materials, in all formats, with a focus on the Kakadu and West Arnhem region.

== Notable residents ==
- Miranda Tapsell (born 1987), actress, grew up in Jabiru.
- Dr Chris le Gras PHD, Environmental Research Institute of The Supervising Scientist - ERISS

== Climate ==
Jabiru has a tropical savanna climate (Aw), typical of most of the Top End. Jabiru experiences heavy rain that often results in widespread flooding along the Arnhem Highway and Kakadu Highway. During 2006–07 Jabiru had its biggest wet season on record cutting both highways after almost 2 metres (6 ft 7 in) of rain fell over a 3-month period. The Arnhem Highway was cut off for several weeks as the West Alligator bridge was severely damaged. Temperatures can drop below 10 °C (50 °F) in the winter/dry season from May to August and peak at over 40 °C (104 °F) during the buildup season from September to November. Spectacular electrical storms are also frequent during this period, before the prolonged rains of the wet season arrive. The wet season is usually associated with the monsoon rains and tropical cyclones and it occurs between December and March (the southern hemisphere summer), when thunderstorms are common and afternoon relative humidity averages over 70 percent during the wettest months.

Climate data for Jabiru, Northern Territory, Australia (1991-2020 normals, extremes and sunshine 1971–present)
Month	Jan	Feb	Mar	Apr	May	Jun	Jul	Aug	Sep	Oct	Nov	Dec	Year
Record high °C (°F)	38.4 (101.1)	37.7 (99.9)	38.0 (100.4)	38.0 (100.4)	37.6 (99.7)	36.7 (98.1)	37.0 (98.6)	38.5 (101.3)	40.4 (104.7)	42.3 (108.1)	42.4 (108.3)	41.6 (106.9)	42.4 (108.3)
Mean daily maximum °C (°F)	33.8 (92.8)	33.6 (92.5)	34.2 (93.6)	34.7 (94.5)	33.7 (92.7)	32.2 (90.0)	32.5 (90.5)	34.0 (93.2)	36.7 (98.1)	37.9 (100.2)	37.4 (99.3)	35.3 (95.5)	34.7 (94.4)
Daily mean °C (°F)	29.3 (84.7)	29.2 (84.6)	29.5 (85.1)	29.3 (84.7)	28.0 (82.4)	26.1 (79.0)	25.8 (78.4)	26.6 (79.9)	28.3 (82.9)	31.0 (87.8)	31.3 (88.3)	30.3 (86.5)	28.7 (83.7)
Mean daily minimum °C (°F)	24.8 (76.6)	24.7 (76.5)	24.7 (76.5)	23.9 (75.0)	22.2 (72.0)	19.9 (67.8)	19.1 (66.4)	19.2 (66.6)	21.7 (71.1)	24.1 (75.4)	25.1 (77.2)	25.2 (77.4)	22.9 (73.2)
Record low °C (°F)	20.3 (68.5)	20.6 (69.1)	19.5 (67.1)	16.0 (60.8)	13.9 (57.0)	9.9 (49.8)	8.8 (47.8)	12.0 (53.6)	12.0 (53.6)	13.7 (56.7)	19.0 (66.2)	21.1 (70.0)	8.8 (47.8)
Average rainfall mm (inches)	370.2 (14.57)	369.0 (14.53)	297.0 (11.69)	108.8 (4.28)	20.7 (0.81)	1.3 (0.05)	3.3 (0.13)	1.4 (0.06)	13.6 (0.54)	49.4 (1.94)	123.2 (4.85)	230.6 (9.08)	1,588.5 (62.53)
Average rainy days (≥ 1 mm)	19.1	17.8	16.4	6.4	1.7	0.3	0.2	0.1	0.5	3.0	9.0	14.6	89.1
Average afternoon relative humidity (%)	66	69	58	44	37	34	29	26	25	28	39	56	43
Average dew point °C (°F)	24.0 (75.2)	24.4 (75.9)	22.4 (72.3)	18.7 (65.7)	15.7 (60.3)	13.1 (55.6)	11.0 (51.8)	10.3 (50.5)	11.9 (53.4)	14.5 (58.1)	18.8 (65.8)	22.5 (72.5)	17.3 (63.1)
Mean monthly sunshine hours	198.4	186.5	189.1	258.0	288.3	282.0	300.7	310.0	282.0	291.4	252.0	226.3	3,064.7
Mean daily sunshine hours	6.4	6.6	6.1	8.6	9.3	9.4	9.7	10.0	9.4	9.4	8.4	7.3	8.4
Percentage possible sunshine	50	53	50	73	81	82	85	85	78	76	66	57	70
Source 1: Australian Bureau of Meteorology
Source 2: Australian Bureau of Meteorology
