= Sally Gearin =

Australian lawyer (born 1949)

Sally May Gearin (née Tait, born 1949) is an Australian lawyer. She was the first female member of the Bar in the Northern Territory. She was voted NT Professional Woman of the Year in 2025 for her contributions to the law and to the community.

== Early life and education ==
Gearin was born in Sydney, New South Wales, in 1949 to Ellen (née Dempsey) and Alan Louvain Tait, She attended St Kevin's Primary School in Eastwood and Our Lady Of Mercy College, a Catholic boarding school at Parramatta. In 1967 she was awarded a Commonwealth Scholarship to study law at the Australian National University in Canberra.

== Career ==
Following her studies Gearin worked in Sydney. In 1986 the Northern Territory Attorney General's Department recruited Gearin, who was soon promoted to the role of senior litigation solicitor. She was called to the Bar by invitation in 1989. She was the first woman barrister in the Northern Territory and joined William Forster Chambers in January 1990.

During her career, Gearin was active in community and social organisations; she worked with other women to establish the first women's refuge in Darwin in 1988 and helped establish community legal services and refugee advocacy in Darwin in the 1990s.

In 1992 she was awarded a Northern Territory Women's Fellowship by the Northern Territory Government and travelled to the USA with fellow lawyer Judy Harrison to research responses to domestic violence. The resulting book and recommendations contributed significantly to policy developments in the field, both in the Northern Territory and nationally.

In the early 2000s she was the President of the NT Chapter of the International Commission of Jurists and was an official observer at the War Crimes Tribunal hearings in Dili in 2002. She was a founder of the NT Women Lawyers Association in 1987 and the Australian Women Lawyers Association in 1997.

Gearin was recognised nationally as a Trailblazing Woman Lawyer in 2016, one of only 45 in the country. Her interviews are held in the National Archives.

Gearin retired from the Bar in 2010. Since then she has served on a number of Tribunals and was for 5 years the legal advisor to the Northern Territory Legislative Assembly on Human Rights and Rule of law compliance in NT legislation. She served as a part time member on NTCAT for 8 years and was in September 2025 appointed NT Legal Aid Commissioner representing community interests.

In 2025 Gearin was voted Northern Territory Professional Woman of Year. In 2026 Gearin was appointed for 3 years as the NT Liquor Commissioner.

== Publications ==
- Working together to prevent domestic violence in the Northern Territory (with Judy Harrison, 1994)
