= Tiwi Islands Region =

Coordinates: 12.4500°S 130.8330°E

Tiwi Islands Regional Council
- Local government area
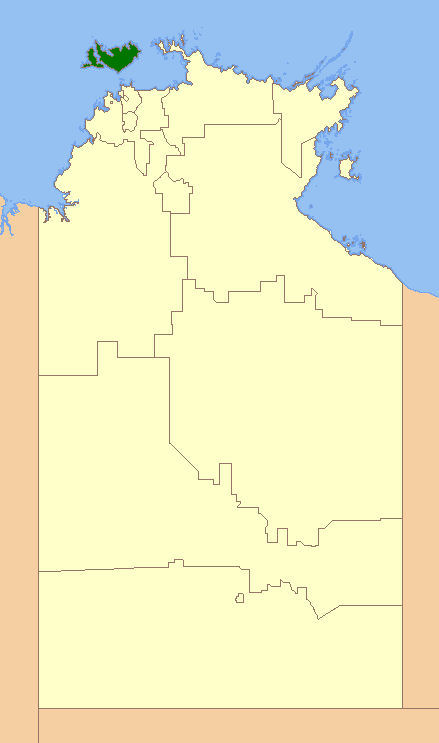

- Interactive map of Tiwi Islands Regional Council
- Country: Australia
- State: Northern Territory
- Region: Tiwi Islands
- Established: 2014
- Council seat: Milikapiti

Government
  - Mayor: Pirrawayingi Puruntatameri
  - Territory electorate: Arafura
  - Federal division: Lingiari

Area
  - Total: 7,483 km^{2} (2,889 sq mi)

Population
  - Total: 2,753 (2018)
  - Density: 0.36790/km^{2} (0.95286/sq mi)
- Website: Tiwi Islands Regional Council
LGAs around Tiwi Islands Regional Council
| Timor Sea | Timor Sea | Arafura Sea |
| Timor Sea | Tiwi Islands Regional Council | West Arnhem |
| Wagait | Darwin | West Arnhem |

The Tiwi Islands Region is a local government area (LGA) of the Northern Territory, Australia. The LGA covers an area of 7,483 square kilometres (2,889 sq mi) and had an estimated population of 2,753 in June 2018, and is governed by the Tiwi Islands Regional Council, formerly Tiwi Islands Shire Council.

== History ==
In October 2006 the Northern Territory Government announced the reform of local government areas. The intention of the reform was to improve and expand the delivery of services to towns and communities across the Northern Territory by establishing eleven new shires. The Tiwi Islands Shire Council was created on 1 July 2008 as were the remaining ten shires.

The Tiwi Islands Shire Council became the Tiwi Islands Regional Council under legislation passed by the Northern Territory Government in January 2014.

== Description and governance ==
The local government area covers an area of 7,483 square kilometres (2,889 sq mi) and had an estimated population of 2,753 in June 2018.

The most recent council elections (which also elected the Mayor) were held on 10 September 2021. The current mayor is Pirrawayingi Puruntatameri (an independent) and the current Deputy Mayor is Leslie Tungatalum (a member of the Country Liberal Party).

== Wards ==
The Tiwi Islands Regional Council is divided into three wards: Bathurst, Milikapiti and Pirlangimpi. The council is governed by 12 councillors, six from Bathurst Ward and three each from the Milikapiti and Pirlangimpi Wards:

| Bathurst (6) | Milikapiti (3) | Pirlangimpi (3) |
|---|---|---|
| Leslie Tungatalum (CLP); Jennifer Clancy; Luke Tipuamantumirri; Francis Xavier Kurrupuwu (CLP); Peter Kantilla; Stanley Tipiloura | Lynette De Santis; Jeffrey Ullungura; Pius Tipungwuti | Pirrawayingi Puruntatameri; Therese Bourke; Joseph Gideon Pangiraminni |

== Localities and communities ==
Land within the Tiwi Islands Region was divided during 2007 into bounded areas for the purpose of creating an address for a property. The bounded areas are called "localities" with those localities associated with existing Aboriginal communities being called "communities".

=== Localities ===
- Tiwi Islands

=== Communities ===
| Community | Population | Map |
|---|---|---|
| Milikapiti | 414 (SAL 2021) | |
| Pirlangimpi (Garden Point) | 317 (SAL 2021) | |
| Wurrumiyanga (Nguiu) | 1,421 (SAL 2021) | |

== Demographics ==
The demographics of the region are shown in the tables below.

=== Ancestry ===
| Ancestry | Number | Percentage |
|---|---|---|
| Aboriginal | 2,023 | 82.3% |
| (Australia) Australian | 174 | 7.1% |
| (England) English | 89 | 3.6% |
| (Republic of Ireland) Irish | 31 | 1.3% |
| (Scotland) Scottish | 22 | 0.9% |
| (Fiji) Fijian | 20 | 0.8% |
| (Philippines) Filipino | 12 | 0.5% |
| Torres Strait Islander | 11 | 0.4% |
| (New Zealand) New Zealander | 8 | 0.3% |
| (Greece) Greek | 6 | 0.2% |
| (Estonia) Estonian | 6 | 0.2% |
| (Japan) Japanese | 6 | 0.2% |
| (China) Chinese | 5 | 0.2% |
| (Samoa) Samoan | 4 | 0.2% |
| (Tonga) Tongan | 4 | 0.2% |
| (Vietnam) Vietnamese | 4 | 0.2% |
| (Netherlands) Dutch | 4 | 0.2% |
| (Germany) German | 3 | 0.1% |
| South Sea Islander | 3 | 0.1% |
| (Afghanistan) Afghan | 3 | 0.1% |
| (Italy) Italian | 3 | 0.1% |
| (Indonesia) Indonesian | 3 | 0.1% |

=== Birthplace ===
Before 2016, all Tiwi Islanders who stated their country of birth were born in Australia. Between 2011 and 2016, however, over ten arrivals each from the Philippines, the United Kingdom and Fiji arrived in the islands.

| Country | Number | Percentage | Change since 2011 |
|---|---|---|---|
| Australia | 2,319 | 94.5% | -233 |
| Philippines | 15 | 0.6% | +15 |
| United Kingdom | 13 | 0.5% | +13 |
| Fiji | 12 | 0.5% | +12 |

=== Language ===
==== Language spoken at home ====
| Language | Number | Percentage | Change since 2011 |
|---|---|---|---|
| Australian Aboriginal languages (primarily Tiwi) | 2,022 | 82.4% | -3 |
| English | 272 | 11.1% | -204 |
| Fijian | 15 (Note: 12 of these were born in Fiji.) | 0.6% | +15 |
| Only English | 272 | 11.1% | -204 |
| Language other than English | 2,063 | 84.1% | +19 |

==== Proficiency in English ====
| Proficiency | Number | Percentage | Change since 2011 |
|---|---|---|---|
| Speaks another language and English well or very well | 1,856 | 75.7% | -22 |
| Speaks only English | 272 | 11.1% | -205 |
| Speaks another language, but speaks English not well or not at all | 102 | 4.2% | -62 |

=== Religion ===
| Religion | Number | Percentage | Change since 2011 |
|---|---|---|---|
| Roman Catholicism | 2,080 | 84.4% | -117 |
| No religion | 136 | 5.6% | -22 |
| Christianity (not further defined) | 24 | 1.0% | -3 |
| Uniting Church | 15 | 0.6% | -14 |
| Christianity | 2,156 | 88.1% | -156 |
| Not stated (Note: In the 2016 Census, the religion question was optional and many Australians did not answer it.) | 143 | 5.9% | +61 |
