= West Arnhem Region =

Coordinates: 12°40′01″S 132°49′59″E

- Local government area
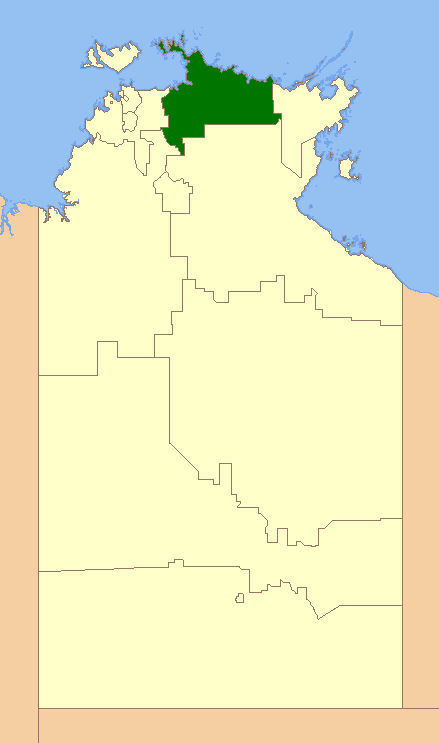

- Interactive map of West Arnhem Region
- Country: Australia
- State: Northern Territory
- Region: Arnhem Land
- Established: 2008
- Council seat: Jabiru

Government
  - Mayor: Matthew Ryan
  - Territory electorate: Arafura
  - Federal division: Lingiari

Area
  - Total: 49,675 km^{2} (19,180 sq mi)

Population
  - Total: 6,902 (2018)
  - Density: 0.138943/km^{2} (0.359861/sq mi)
- Website: West Arnhem Region
LGAs around West Arnhem Region
Tiwi	Arafura Sea	Arafura Sea
Unincorporated Top End Region	West Arnhem Region	East Arnhem
Unincorporated Top End Region	Roper Gulf	Roper Gulf

The West Arnhem Region is a local government area of the Northern Territory, Australia and is administered by the West Arnhem Regional Council. The region, located in Arnhem Land, covers an area of 49,675 square kilometres (19,180 sq mi) and had a population of 6,902 in June 2018.

== History ==
In October 2006 the Northern Territory Government announced the reform of local government areas. The intention of the reform was to improve and expand the delivery of services to towns and communities across the Northern Territory by establishing eleven new shires. The West Arnhem Shire was created on 1 July 2008. Elections of Shire Councillors were held on 25 October 2008.

As of 2017 the Mayor of the West Arnhem Shire was Matthew Ryan.

On 1 January 2014, the Shire became the West Arnhem Region.

The Region formerly consisted of unincorporated land, plus small areas under the control of Community Government Councils or incorporated communities:

- Town of Jabiru
- Maningrida Community
- Gunbalanya Community
- Minjilang Community
- Warruwi Community

== Wards ==
West Arnhem Regional Council is composed of five wards, totalling twelve councillors. Minjilang Ward and Warruwi Ward elect one member each, Gunbalanya Ward and Kakadu Ward elect three each, and Maningrida Ward elects four.

2025 West Arnhem Council
Ward	Councillors			
Minjilang	Steven Nabalmarda			
Warruwi	James Marrawal			
Gunbalanya	Henry Yates	Ralph McCoy	Daniel Siebert	
Kakadu	Ralph Francis Blyth	Mickitja Onus	Kylie Lindner	
Maningrida	Jacqueline Phillips	James Woods	Joseph Diddo	Jermaine Namanurki

== Localities and communities ==
Land within the West Arnhem Region was divided during 2007 into bounded areas for the purpose of creating an address for a property. The bounded areas are called "localities" with those localities associated with Aboriginal communities being called "communities".

=== Localities ===
- Cobourg
- Kakadu
- Van Diemen Gulf
- West Arnhem

=== Communities ===
Community	Population	Map
Gunbalanya (Oenpelli)	1,177 (SAL 2021)	
Jabiru	755 (SAL 2021)	
Maningrida	2,518 (SAL 2021)	
Minjilang (Mission Bay)	265 (SAL 2021)	
Warruwi	432 (SAL 2021)	
