= Belyuen Shire =

Coordinates: 13°02′20″S 131°03′07″E

- Local government area
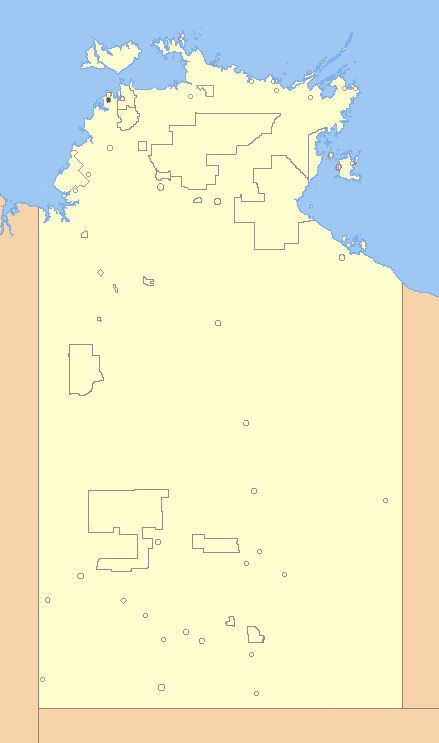
- Location of Belyuen Shire

- Interactive map of Belyuen Shire
- Country: Australia
- State: Northern Territory
- Region: Outer Darwin
- Established: 1992
- Council seat: Belyuen

Government
  - Mayor: Eddie Shields
  - Territory electorate: Daly
  - Federal division: Lingiari

Area
  - Total: 41.4 km^{2} (16.0 sq mi)

Population
  - Total: 174 (2018)
  - Density: 4.203/km^{2} (10.89/sq mi)
- Website: Belyuen Shire

The Belyuen Shire is a local government area in the Northern Territory of Australia near Wagait Beach on the Cox Peninsula located across Darwin Harbour from the city of Darwin. The administrative area is centred on the mostly Indigenous community of Belyuen, known officially as Delissaville prior to 1975. Delissaville and its airstrip were named for Benjamin Cohen De Lissa of Queensland, sugar grower and investor in G. T. Bean's failed Port Darwin Sugar Company and the equally unsuccessful Delissa Pioneer Sugar Company.

Belyuen was established as a Community Government Council on 28 August 1992. On 1 July 2008, it became one of the eleven shires in the territory, changed by the Northern Territory Government.

== See also ==
- Local government areas of the Northern Territory
