= Local government areas of the Northern Territory =

Federal Australian territory in north-central Australia

Location of Northern Territory in Australia

Map of local government areas in the Northern Territory as of 1 July 2014

The Northern Territory is a federal Australian territory in north-central Australia. It is the third largest Australian federal division with an area of 1,348,094.3 square kilometres (520,502 sq mi) but the least populous with 245,929 inhabitants as at June 2019. The Northern Territory is divided administratively into 18 Local government areas (LGAs) generally known as Councils who are responsible for providing local government services.

The most recent local elections were held in 2025. The next elections are scheduled to be held on 25 August 2029.

== Area types ==
As of 1 July 2008, there were two classifications of local government in the Northern Territory:

1. Municipalities (predominantly inner-city suburban areas and smaller rural towns), of which there were five; and
2. Shires or Regions (predominantly rural or outer suburban areas), of which there were eleven shire councils.

The Northern Territory was unusual as a comparatively large share of the territory's population lived in unincorporated areas. In 2006, prior to the reorganisation of local government areas in the territory, 92 percent of the land area (1,237,999 km^{2} (477,994 sq mi) out of 1,349,130 km^{2} (520,900 sq mi)) with 16 percent of the population (30,523 out of 192,898), was unincorporated. This anomaly is due to the territory's very low population density, just 0.16 people per km^{2} (0.099 people per sq mi).

Most of the unincorporated areas disappeared as a result of local government reform in 2008. The area remaining unincorporated is 19,790 km^{2} (7,640 sq mi), 1.47 percent of the total, and contains 3.0 percent of the population in June 2019.

By comparison, in the only other states or territories in Australia with unincorporated areas, only 0.02% of the population of New South Wales, 0.002% of Victoria's population and 0.6% of the population of South Australia, live in unincorporated areas.

== Current local government areas ==
Local government area	Council seat	Region	Type	Year est.	Land area		Population		Notes
Local government area	Council seat	Region	Type	Year est.	km^{2}	sq mi	2021	2022	Notes
Alice Springs, Town of	Alice Springs	Central Australia	Town	1 July 1971	328	127	28,601	28,922	
Barkly Region	Tennant Creek	Barkly Tableland	Region	1 July 2008	322,713	124,600	7,203	7,239	
Belyuen Shire	Belyuen	Greater Darwin	Shire	1 July 2008	41	16	165	165	
Central Desert Region	Alice Springs	Central Australia	Region	1 July 2008	281,312	108,615	4,124	4,114	
Coomalie Community Government Council	Batchelor	Greater Darwin	Council	7 December 1990	2,056	794	1,403	1,399	
Darwin, City of	Darwin	Greater Darwin	City	1854	111	43	85,397	85,158	Darwin Town and District Council formed, 1874; redesignated Darwin Town Council, 1915; redesignated Municipality of Darwin, 1955; redesignated City of Darwin, 1959
East Arnhem Region	Nhulunbuy	Arnhem Land	Region	1 July 2008	33,310	12,861	10,097	10,096	
Katherine, Town of	Katherine	Katherine	Town	3 March 1978	7,417	2,864	10,706	10,802	
Groote Archipelago Region	Groote Eylandt	Arnhem Land	Region	1 September 2024					Split from East Arnhem Region in 2024
Litchfield Council	Freds Pass	Greater Darwin	Council	6 September 1985	2,903	1,121	23,048	23,209	
MacDonnell Region	Alice Springs	Central Australia	Region	1 July 2008	268,329	103,602	6,583	6,640	
Palmerston, City of	Palmerston	Greater Darwin	City	2000 (as a city)	53	20	39,641	40,447	
Roper Gulf Region	Katherine	Katherine	Region	1 July 2008	185,210	71,510	7,442	7,487	
Tiwi Islands Region	Darwin	Greater Darwin	Region	1 July 2008	7,483	2,889	2,738	2,744	
Victoria Daly Region	Katherine	Katherine	Region	1 July 2008	153,287	59,184	3,224	3,265	De-amalgamated in 2014 into Victoria Daly and West Daly Regional Councils
Wagait Shire	Wagait Beach	Greater Darwin	Shire	1 July 2008	6	2	465	465	Formerly the Cox Peninsula Community Government Council, established on 28 April 1995.
West Arnhem Region	Jabiru	Arnhem Land	Region	1 July 2008	49,675	19,180	7,186	7,249	
West Daly Region	Wadeye	Katherine	Region	1 July 2014	14,070	5,432	3,426	3,439	Part of Victoria Daly Regional Council from 2008 until 2014 de-amalgamation

== Former local government areas ==
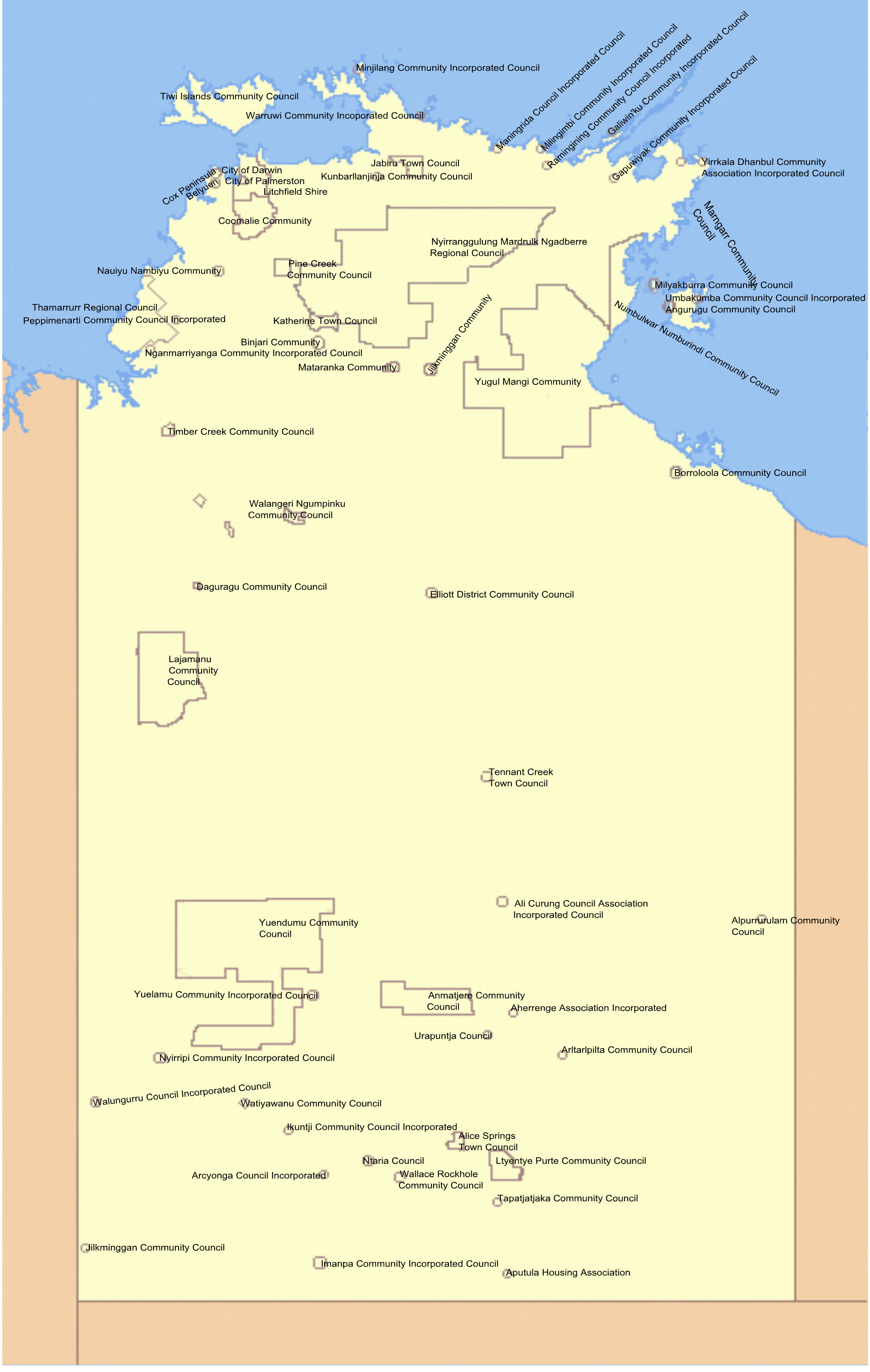
Map of old local government areas in the Northern Territory prior 1 July 2008

Prior to 1 July 2008, local government areas in the Northern Territory were classified as either :

- Community Government Councils of which 51 existed,
- Incorporated Associations (Commonwealth) of which three existed,
- Municipalities of which six existed and
- Special Purpose Towns of which there is only one example.

=== Towns ===
- Town of Jabiru (special purpose town)
- Town of Tennant Creek

=== Community Government Councils ===
- Alpurrurulam CGC
- Angurugu CGC
- Anmatjere CGC
- Arltarlpilta CGC
- Belyuen CGC (now Belyuen Shire)
- Binjari CGC
- Borroloola CGC
- Coomalie CGC (now Coomalie Shire)
- Cox Peninsula CGC (now Wagait Shire)
- Daguragu CGC
- Elliott District CGC
- Jilkminggan CGC
- Kunbarllanjnja CGC
- Lajamanu CGC
- Ltyentye Apurte CGC
- Marngarr CGC
- Mataranka CGC
- Nauiyu Nambiyu CGC
- Numbulwar Numburindi CGC
- Nyirranggulung Mardrulk Ngadberre Regional Council
- Pine Creek CGC
- Tapatjatjaka CGC
- Thamarrurr Regional Council
- Timber Creek CGC
- Tiwi Islands CGC (now Tiwi Islands Region)
- Walangeri Ngumpinku CGC
- Wallace Rockhole CGC
- Watiyawanu CGC
- Yuendumu CGC
- Yugul Mangi CGC

=== Incorporated Communities ===
- Aherrenge Community
- Ali Curung Community
- Amoonguna Community
- Aputula Community
- Areyonga Community
- Galiwin'ku Community
- Gapuwiyak Community
- Ikuntji Community
- Imanpa Community
- Kaltukatjara Community
- Maningrida Community
- Milingimbi Community
- Milyakburra Community
- Minjilang Community
- Mutitjulu Community
- Nganmarriyanga Community
- Ntaria Community (Hermannsburg)
- Nyirrpi Community
- Papunya Community
- Peppimenarti Community
- Ramingining Community
- Umbakumba Community
- Urapuntja Aboriginal Corporation
- Walungurru Community
- Warruwi Community
- Yuelamu Community

=== Unincorporated Area ===
- Unincorporated Area: A contiguous 92 percent of the area did not belong to any local government area. The LGAs were enclaves within unincorporated territory.

== See also ==
- Local government in Australia
- List of places in the Northern Territory by population

== Sources ==
- "Shires of Australia". Statoids.
