= Manbulloo, Northern Territory =

Manbulloo Katherine, Northern Territory
- Coordinates: 14°48′00″S 132°15′00″E
- Population: 12 (2016 census)
- Postcode(s): 0852
- Time zone: ACST (UTC+9:30)
- Location: 15 km (9 mi) SW of Katherine
- LGA(s): Katherine Town Council
- Territory electorate(s): Katherine
- Federal division(s): Lingiari
Suburbs around Manbulloo:
Florina	Cossack; Binjari	Katherine South; Uralla
	Manbulloo	Tindal

Manbulloo is a locality in the Northern Territory, Australia. It is located within the Katherine Town Council local government area, approximately 15 km (9.3 mi) south-west of the town Katherine on the Victoria Highway. The locality was officially defined in April 2007, with the name being a corruption of a word meaning "pallid cuckoo" in the Wardaman language, and was first settled by Europeans as a pastoral station.

Established in 1917 by the North Australia Meat Company to support the operations of Vestey's Meatworks, Manbulloo Station was located close to the recently extended North Australia Railway, allowing direct rail access for livestock to be transported to Vestey's Meatworks in Darwin. The area was the site of Manbulloo Airfield, a World War II base built in 1942 that hosted squadrons of the Royal Australian Air Force and United States Army Air Force. During the war, a field abattoir and fresh food processing camp was also established by the Australian Army at Manbulloo.

Today, Manbulloo is a sparsely populated rural locality containing commercial mango plantations and a CSIRO research station. Much of the land is still occupied by the 370,910 ha (916,500 acres) Manbulloo Station, carrying 20,000 head of cattle. The station was sold to foreign investors in 2019, to be leased back to its current operators. The original riverside homestead now functions as tourist accommodation, with a surrounding caravan park.
