= Emungalan =

- Suburb
- Interactive map of Emungalan
- Country: Australia
- State: Northern Territory
- City: Katherine
- LGA: Katherine Town Council
- Location: 1.5 km (0.93 mi) W of Katherine
- Established: 1917

Government
  - Territory electorate: Katherine
  - Federal division: Lingiari

Population
  - Total: 349 (2011 census)
- Postcode: 0850
Suburbs around Emungalan
		Lansdowne
	Emungalan	Katherine
Cossack	Cossack	Katherine South

Emungalan is a suburb in the town of Katherine, Northern Territory, Australia. It is within the Katherine Town Council local government area. The name Emungalan is believed to come from an Aboriginal word meaning "Place of Stone" or "Stony". The area was officially defined as a suburb in April 2007, adopting the name from the former railhead settlement north of the Katherine River.

== History ==
Emungalan was surveyed in 1917, when works to extend the Palmerston and Pine Creek Railway south to the Katherine River neared completion. The original settlement on the river at Knott's Crossing relocated closer to the railhead. Within a year of the line opening, by 1918 Emungalan was served by a post office and police station as well as a number of businesses. The permanent population was estimated at 20 people. At its peak the town grew to 200 residents, boasting a hotel, an airstrip and a racecourse. A school initially operated out of the railway station building to serve the district before a permanent facility was opened in 1923. The town declined rapidly following the completion of the bridge across the Katherine River in 1926, when the railway station along with many homes and businesses relocated to the current site of the Katherine CBD. The airstrip remained in use until 1930 when it was also relocated across the river.

== Present day ==
A small cemetery adjacent to the abandoned North Australia Railway line is the most intact reminder of the former settlement and is listed on the Northern Territory Heritage Register. The area around the junction of the Stuart Highway and Emungalan Road is now an industrial area, with some agriculture and rural residential development particularly around Leight Creek, a tributary of the Katherine River. The suburb has been identified as a future focus for further industrial development and medium term planning calls for upgrades to water and sewerage allowing residential subdivision. Kalano Aboriginal community is located in the east of the suburb, as is the Katherine Town Council administrative chambers.
