= Big Rivers Football League =

Australian rules football competition in Katherine, Northern Territory, Australia

Big Rivers Football League (BRFL)
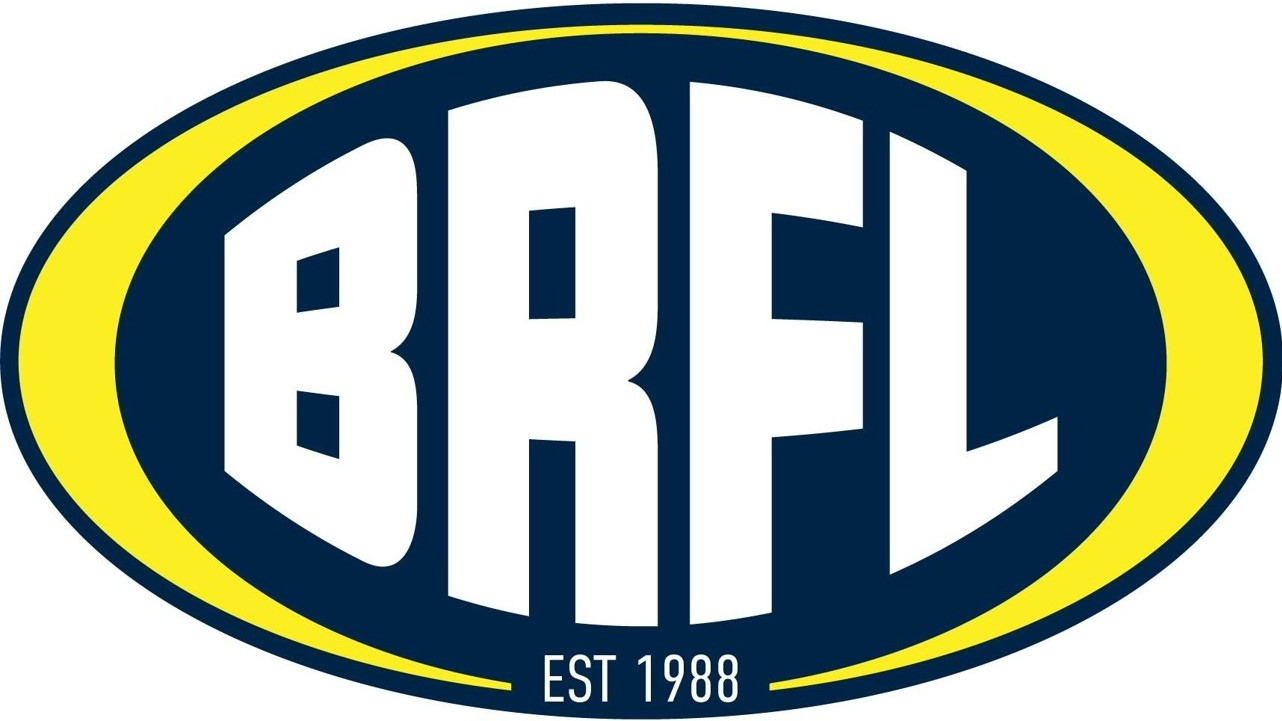
- Sport: Australian Rules Football
- Founded: 1988
- Administrator: AFL Northern Territory
- No. of teams: 9
- Headquarters: Katherine Sportsground Pavillion, Katherine East
- Venues: Katherine Showgrounds, Katherine South; Adrian McDonald Memorial Oval, Katherine; Tindal Oval, Tindal; Phyliss Winjorrotj Oval, Barunga
- Most recent champions: Men: Katherine Camels (6); Women: Arnhem Crows (6); Men's Cup (B-Grade): Jilkminggan Blues (2) (2026)
- Most titles: Katherine South (9), Eastside/Rowlands FC (9) (Men's); Arnhem Crows (6) (Women's); Lajamanu/Northern Warlpiri (3) (B-Grade/Reserves/Men's Cup)
- Website: PlayHQ

The Big Rivers Football League (formerly the Katherine District Football League) is an Australian rules football competition in the Northern Territory, Australia based in the Katherine region. It was formed after the dissolution of Katherine Kangaroos of the NTFL in 1987. It is an affiliate league of AFL Northern Territory, who administer the competition. It consists of 9 clubs, of which 2 are currently women's only, being Eastside FC and Katherine South (both having men's teams in previous seasons). The Men's best and fairest medal is currently named after local Katherine football legend Doug Kelly.

It consists of 1 Senior Men's (5 teams), 1 Senior Women's Division (6 teams) and a Men's Cup competition (3 teams) in the 2026 season. Katherine River Saints and Northern Warlpiri Mozzies (formerly Swans) have joined the senior women's division for the 2026 season. Most games are played at the Katherine Showgrounds, with the exception of a few games where teams get home community games or when the Showgrounds aren't available for use. Other grounds used for games in 2026 included Adrian McDonald Memorial Oval (Kalano), Tindal Oval, and Phyliss Winjorrotj (Barunga) Oval. Yearly Friday night showcase games are held at Barunga Festival between Arnhem Crows and another opponent for both Men and Women divisions. Grand Finals are a big event in Katherine, often drawing over 1000 spectators and both men's and women's grand finals are broadcast live on the AFLNTv YouTube channel.

The start of the 2026 season was delayed by two weeks due to the March 2026 Katherine Floods, which affected the Katherine Showgrounds and Adrian McDonald Memorial (Kalano) ovals.

== Current clubs ==
=== Men ===
Club	Colours	Nickname	Home Ground	Est.	Years in BRFL	BRFL Senior Mens Premierships		Grand Final Appearances (Senior Men's)	BRFL B-Grade/Reserves Premierships	
Club	Colours	Nickname	Home Ground	Est.	Years in BRFL	Total	Years		Total	Years
Arnhem		Crows	Phyliss Winjorrotj Oval, Barunga	1995	1995, 2001–2015, 2019–	6	2001, 2002, 2003, 2006, 2009, 2011	2001, 2002, 2003, 2006, 2009, 2011, 2019	0	-
Garrak (Kalano 1988–2020)		Bombers	Adrian McDonald Memorial Oval, Katherine	1988	1988-1989, 1997–2005, 2007–2010, 2012–	0	-	2016	1	2008
Katherine		Camels	Katherine Showgrounds, Katherine	2010	2011–	6	2012, 2019, 2022, 2024, 2025, 2026	2012, 2014, 2015, 2017, 2019, 2020, 2021, 2022, 2024, 2025, 2026	1	2012
Katherine River		Saints	Katherine Showgrounds, Katherine	2025	2025–	0	-	-	N/A	N/A
Northern Warlpiri (Lajamanu 1991-2016)		Mozzies (Swans 1991-2025)	Lajamanu Oval, Lajamanu	1991	1992, 1995–1997, 2002–2017, 2019–	2	2005, 2008	2004, 2005, 2006, 2008, 2026	See Men's Cup	See Men's Cup

=== Women ===
Club	Colours	Nickname	Home Ground	Est.	Years in BRFL (Women's Division)	BRFL Womens Premierships		Grand Final Appearances
Club	Colours	Nickname	Home Ground	Est.	Years in BRFL (Women's Division)	Total	Years	
Arnhem		Crows	Phyliss Winjorrotj Oval, Barunga	2001	2020–	6	2020, 2021, 2023, 2024, 2025, 2026	2020, 2021, 2023, 2024, 2025, 2026
Eastside		Blues	Katherine Showgrounds, Katherine	1988	2018–	3	2018, 2019 2022	2018, 2019, 2022, 2024, 2026
Katherine		Camels	Katherine Showgrounds, Katherine	2010	2018–2022, 2024–	0	-	2018, 2019
Katherine River		Saints	Katherine Showgrounds, Katherine	2025	2026–	0	-	-
Katherine South		Crocs	Katherine Showgrounds, Katherine	1990	2018–	0	-	2020, 2021
Northern Warlpiri		Mozzies	Lajamanu Oval, Lajamanu	1991	2026–	0	–	-

=== Men's Cup ===
Club	Colours	Nickname	Home Ground	Former League	Est.	Years in BRFL	BRFL B-Grade Premierships	
Club	Colours	Nickname	Home Ground	Former League	Est.	Years in BRFL	Total	Years
Gurindji		Eagles	Michael Jarparta Paddy Football Oval, Kalkarindji	KFL	1995	1995–1996, 1998–2003, 2006–2009, 2014–2017, 2021, 2024–	1	2017
Jilkminggan		Blues	Jilkminggan Oval, Jilkminggan	–	2001	2001–2003, 2007–2015, 2017, 2021, 2026–	2	2009, 2026
Northern Warlpiri (reserves side)		Mozzies	Lajamanu Oval, Lajamanu	–	1991	2026–	3	1994/95, 1996/97, 2016

=== Men's sides in recess ===
Club	Colours	Nickname	Home Ground	Est.	Years in BRFL	BRFL Senior Mens Premierships		Grand Final Appearances (Senior Men's)	BRFL B-Grade/Reserves Premierships		Fate
Club	Colours	Nickname	Home Ground	Est.	Years in BRFL	Total	Years		Total	Years	Fate
Eastside (Rowlands FC 1988-1990)		Blues	Katherine Showgrounds, Katherine	1988	1989–2004, 2011–2019, 2021–	9	1988/89, 1990/91, 1993/94, 1998/99, 2013, 2014, 2015, 2016, 2017	1988/89, 1989/90, 1990/91, 1992/93, 1993/94, 1995/96, 1996/97, 1998/99, 2001, 2013, 2014, 2015, 2016, 2017, 2018	1	1999/00	In recess since 2024 season
Katherine South		Crocs	Katherine Showgrounds, Katherine South	1991	1991–2004, 2017–2023	9	1991/92, 1992/93, 1994/95, 1995/96, 1996/97, 1997/98, 2018, 2020, 2021	1991/92, 1992/93, 1993/94, 1994/95, 1995/96, 1996/97, 1997/98, 1998/99, 2000, 2018, 2020, 2021, 2023	0	-	In recess since 2023 season

=== Women's sides in recess ===
Club	Colours	Nickname	Home Ground	Est.	Years in BRFL	BRFL Senior Womens Premierships		Fate
Club	Colours	Nickname	Home Ground	Est.	Years in BRFL	Total	Years	Fate
Garrak		Bombers	Adrian McDonald Memorial Oval, Katherine	1980's	2022	0	-	In recess since 2022 season

== Former clubs ==
Club	Colours	Nickname	Home ground	Est.	Years in BRFL	BRFL Premierships (A-Grade/B-Grade Men's and Senior Women's)		Fate	Note
Club	Colours	Nickname	Home ground	Est.	Years in BRFL	Total	Years	Fate	Note
Barunga		Eagles	Barunga Oval, Barunga		1989–1995, 2008	0	–	Folded	Foundational league club
Beswick		Hawks	Wugularr	2017	2017	0	–	Folded	B-Grade only
Beswick		Bears	Wugularr	1990	1990–1991, 1993–1994, 1998, 2008–2019	1 (A-Grade)	2010	Folded after 2019 season	
Binjari		Saints	Binjari		2010, 2021	0	–	Folded	B-Grade only
Borroloola		Thunders	Borroloola Oval, Borroloola	2021	2025	0	–	Left league	Played one season in BAFL in 2021
Burton and Balls (Bucaneers 2003)		Bucs/Bucaneers	Katherine		1999–2003	0	–	Folded	Was a locally based construction company
Dagaragu			Daguragu	1993 (?)	1993/94-2001(?)	2 (B-Grade)	1993/94, 2001	Folded	Potentially folded into Gurindji, B-Grade only
Daly River		Buffaloes	Nauiyu Oval, Nauiyu	2022	2022–2023	0	–	Left league	Still play in festivals and one-off practice matches
East Arnhem			East Arnhem		1999–2000	0	–	Folded	
Katherine		Kannons	Katherine Showgrounds, Katherine	2006	2006–2010	0	–	Merged with Katherine Roos to form Katherine Camels after 2010 season	
Katherine		Roos	Katherine Showgrounds, Katherine	2009	2009–2010	0	–	Merged with Katherine Kannons to form Katherine Camels after 2010 season	B-Grade only
Kirby's Agents/Katherine		Hawks	Katherine	1988	1989–2002	1 (A-Grade)	1988/89	Folded	Named after Kirby's Katherine Hotel, foundational league club
Minyerri (Hodgson Downs 1996-2001, Alawa 2021)		Tigers	Minyerri	1997	1997-1998, 2001-2010, 2012, 2016-2017, 2021	0	–	Folded	
Ngaliwurru		Lions	Max Duncan Memorial Oval, Timber Creek	2000's	2025	0	–	Folded	Played in East Kimberley FL 2005-2007 and 2011-2014
Ngukurr		Bulldogs	Ngukurr Oval, Ngukurr	1993	1994–2015, 2020–2025	4 (A-Grade)	2000, 2004, 2007, 2023	Withdrew from competition for 2026 season	Played in Barunga Festival in 2026
Numbulwar		Lightning	Numbulwar		2008–2009	0	–	Folded	
Nurralindji				2005	2005				Little information exists
Tindal		Magpies	Tindal Oval, RAAF Base Tindal	1989	1989–2021	3 (B-Grade)	2002, 2003, 2010	Folded after 2021 season	Was made up of members of RAAF Base Tindal, foundational league club
Victoria River		Lions	Timber Creek		1998–1999	2 (B-Grade)	1997/98, 1998/99	Folded	Related to Ngaliwurru Lions, B-Grade only
Waliburru		Thunder	Minyerri		2016–2017	0	-	Folded	B-Grade only
Yarralin			Yarralin		1995–1997, 2002–2003	0	–	Folded	Now named Walangeri Roos
Yugal		Power	Ngukurr	2000	2000–2003	0	–	Folded	B-Grade only

== Premierships (Mens) ==
- 1988/89 Kirby's Agents
- 1989/90 Rowlands
- 1990/91 Eastside (* Formerly known as Rowlands FC)
- 1991/92 Katherine South
- 1992/93 Katherine South
- 1993/94 Eastside
- 1994/95 Katherine South ^
- 1995/96 Katherine South
- 1996/97 Katherine South
- 1997/98 Katherine South
- 1998/99 Eastside
- 2000 Ngukurr
- 2001 Arnhem Bombers
- 2002 Arnhem Crows
- 2003 Arnhem Crows
- 2004 Ngukurr
- 2005 Lajamanu
- 2006 Arnhem Crows
- 2007 Ngukurr
- 2008 Lajamanu
- 2009 Arnhem Crows
- 2010 Beswick
- 2011 Arnhem Crows
- 2012 Katherine Camels
- 2013 Eastside FC
- 2014 Eastside FC
- 2015 Eastside FC
- 2016 Eastside FC
- 2017 Eastside FC
- 2018 Katherine South
- 2019 Katherine Camels
- 2020 Katherine South
- 2021 Katherine South
- 2022 Katherine Camels
- 2023 Ngukurr
- 2024 Katherine Camels
- 2025 Katherine Camels

^Replayed GF due to draw

== Premierships (Women's) ==
- 2018 Eastside
- 2019 Eastside
- 2020 Arnhem Crows
- 2021 Arnhem Crows
- 2022 Eastside
- 2023 Arnhem Crows
- 2024 Arnhem Crows
- 2025 Arnhem Crows

== 2011 Ladder ==
Big Rivers AFL	Wins	Byes	Losses	Draws	For	Against	%	Pts
Beswick Bears	12	0	2	0	1486	554	268.23%	48
Arnhem Crows	11	0	3	0	1213	765	158.56%	44
Ngukurr Bulldogs	11	0	3	0	1216	780	155.90%	44
Katherine Camels	8	0	6	0	949	802	118.33%	32
Eastside	6	0	8	0	876	1076	81.41%	24
Lajamanu Swans	5	0	9	0	899	900	99.89%	20
Tindal Magpies	2	0	12	0	611	1418	43.09%	8
Jikminggan Blues	1	0	13	0	459	1414	32.46%	4

FINALS

Final	Team	G	B	Pts	Team	G	B	Pts
1st Semi	Ngukurr Bulldogs	14	9	93	Katherine Camels	11	4	70
2nd Semi	Arnhem Crows	17	7	109	Beswick Bears	9	10	64
Preliminary	Ngukurr Bulldogs	11	7	73	Beswick Bears	10	11	71
Grand	Arnhem Crows	14	8	92	Ngukurr Bulldogs	12	6	78

== 2012 Ladder ==
Big Rivers AFL	Wins	Byes	Losses	Draws	For	Against	%	Pts
Katherine Camels	13	0	1	0	1280	656	195.12%	52
Ngukurr Bulldogs	11	0	3	0	1264	694	182.13%	44
Beswick Bears	11	0	3	0	1357	760	178.55%	44
Eastside	7	0	7	0	896	996	89.96%	28
Jikminggan Blues	6	0	8	0	908	1125	80.71%	24
Kalano Bombers	5	0	9	0	928	1229	75.51%	20
Tindal Magpies	4	0	5	0	576	630	91.43%	16
Lajamanu Swans	2	0	7	0	271	466	58.15%	8

FINALS

Final	Team	G	B	Pts	Team	G	B	Pts
1st Semi	Katherine Camels	10	19	79	Ngukurr Bulldogs	9	11	65
2nd Semi	Beswick Bears	15	2	92	Eastside	14	7	91
Preliminary	Ngukurr Bulldogs	14	18	102	Beswick Bears	7	6	48
Grand	Katherine Camels	14	6	90	Ngukurr Bulldogs	4	6	30

== 2023 Men's Ladder ==
Big Rivers Football League	Wins	Byes	Losses	Draws	For	Against	%	Pts
Ngukurr Bulldogs	12	1	2	0	1105	586	188.57%	86
Eastside FC	12	1	2	0	1251	829	150.90%	81
Katherine South	8	1	6	0	1070	1044	102.49%	69
Katherine Camels	7	1	6	0	927	880	105.34%	62
Arnhem Crows	7	1	7	0	1012	920	110.00%	57
Daly River Buffaloes	6	1	7	0	1069	979	109.19%	52
Northern Warlpiri Swans	3	1	6	0	702	1036	67.76%	42
Garrak Bombers	0	1	11	0	434	1296	33.49%	39

FINALS

Final	Team	G	B	Pts	Team	G	B	Pts
1st Semi	Katherine South	8	10	58	Katherine Camels	7	5	47
2nd Semi	Ngukurr Bulldogs	17	12	114	Eastside	9	9	63
Preliminary	Eastside	7	8	50	Katherine South	12	11	83
Grand	Ngukurr Bulldogs	14	10	94	Katherine South	9	4	58

== 2024 Men's Ladder ==
Big Rivers Football League	Wins	Byes	Losses	Draws	For	Against	%	Pts
Katherine Camels	9	1	1	0	978	328	298.17%	76
Ngukurr Bulldogs	7	2	1	0	982	411	238.93%	64
Arnhem Crows	8	1	2	0	830	606	136.96%	68
Northern Warlpiri Swans	3	2	5	0	560	575	97.39%	50
Garrak Bombers	3	2	6	0	482	940	51.28%	41
Gurindji Eagles	1	2	7	0	379	823	46.05%	34
Eastside FC	1	1	8	0	371	899	41.27%	35

FINALS

Final	Team	G	B	Pts	Team	G	B	Pts
1st Semi	Arnhem Crows	12	13	85	Northern Warlpiri Swans	6	5	41
2nd Semi	Katherine Camels	13	6	84	Ngukurr Bulldogs	6	7	43
Preliminary	Ngukurr Bulldogs	10	10	70	Arnhem Crows	10	8	68
Grand	Katherine Camels	13	9	87	Ngukurr Bulldogs	11	4	70

== 2025 Men's Ladder ==
Big Rivers Football League	Wins	Byes	Losses	Draws	For	Against	%	Pts	Forfeits
Katherine Camels	10	5	1	0	1071	442	242.31%	83	0
Arnhem Crows	10	4	2	0	1067	539	197.96%	85	0
Garrak Bombers	8	4	4	0	880	871	101.03%	81	0
Ngukurr Bulldogs	9	4	4	0	1065	595	178.99%	80	0
Katherine River Saints	5	5	7	0	678	807	84.01%	66	0
Northern Warlpiri Swans	5	4	6	0	919	811	113.32%	59	2
Borroloola Thunders	4	5	5	0	448	701	63.91%	47	3
Gurindji Eagles	3	5	5	0	436	812	53.69%	40	4
Ngaliwurru Lions	1	5	7	0	257	1243	20.68%	35	4

FINALS

Final	Team	G	B	Pts	Team	G	B	Pts
1st Semi	Garrak Bombers	14	4	88	Ngukurr Bulldogs	14	13	97
2nd Semi	Katherine Camels	12	11	83	Arnhem Crows	10	6	66
Preliminary	Arnhem Crows	10	5	65	Ngukurr Bulldogs	15	12	102
Grand	Katherine Camels	10	13	73	Ngukurr Bulldogs	8	6	54

== Notable former and current players ==
- Ashanti Bush, former Gold Coast Suns AFLW, Hawthorn Hawks VFLW and NT Thunder player. Currently plays for Arnhem Crows,Wanderers in the (NTFL) and AFL Cairns side South Cairns Cutters.
- Doug Kelly, former Wanderers and Katherine Kangaroos (NTFL) player, nicknamed Mr 'Top End Footy'. Played in BRFL for Eastside
- Liam Patrick, former Gold Coast Suns AFL and Wanderers (NTFL) player, nicknamed 'The Lajamanu Lightning Bolt'. Played in BRFL for Lajamanu Swans (Northern Warlpiri Mozzies).
- Relton Roberts, former Richmond Tigers AFL and Wanderers (NTFL) player. Played in BRFL for Arnhem Crows.

== See also ==
- AFL Northern Territory
- Northern Territory Football League
- Australian rules football in the Northern Territory
