= Electoral results for the division of Katherine =

This is a list of electoral results for the electoral division of Katherine in Northern Territory, Australia, elections.

== Members for Katherine ==
Member	Party	Term
Mike Reed	Country Liberal	1987–2003
Fay Miller	Country Liberal	2003–2008
Willem Westra van Holthe	Country Liberal	2008–2016
Sandra Nelson	Labor	2016–2020
Jo Hersey	Country Liberal	2020–present

== Election results ==
=== Elections in the 1980s ===
1987 Northern Territory general election: Katherine
Party	Candidate	Votes	%	±%
Country Liberal	Mike Reed	858	45.2	N/A
NT Nationals	Jim Forscutt	545	28.7	N/A
Labor	Phil Maynard	497	26.2	N/A
Total formal votes		1,900	96.0	N/A
Informal votes		79	4.0	N/A
Turnout		1,979	73.2	N/A
Two-candidate-preferred result
Country Liberal	Mike Reed	1,062	55.9	N/A
NT Nationals	Jim Forscutt	838	44.1	N/A
Country Liberal win		(new seat)		

=== Elections in the 1990s ===
1990 Northern Territory general election: Katherine
Party	Candidate	Votes	%	±%
Country Liberal	Mike Reed	1,442	53.2	+8.0
Labor	Phil Maynard	586	21.6	−4.6
NT Nationals	Jim Forscutt	539	19.9	−8.8
Independent	Laurie Hughes	145	5.3	+5.3
Total formal votes		2,712	98.3	N/A
Informal votes		47	1.7	N/A
Turnout		2,759	82.5	N/A
Two-party-preferred result
Country Liberal	Mike Reed	1,926	71.0	+15.1
Labor	Phil Maynard	786	29.0	+29.0
Country Liberal hold		Swing	N/A	

1994 Northern Territory general election: Katherine
Party	Candidate	Votes	%	±%
Country Liberal	Mike Reed	2,127	70.6	+17.4
Labor	Gabriela Maynard	885	29.4	+7.8
Total formal votes		3,012	95.6	N/A
Informal votes		139	4.4	N/A
Turnout		3,151	84.5	N/A
Country Liberal hold		Swing	−0.4	

1997 Northern Territory general election: Katherine
Party	Candidate	Votes	%	±%
Country Liberal	Mike Reed	1,984	69.6	−1.0
Labor	Michael Pierce	583	20.4	−9.0
Independent	Peter Byers	284	10.0	+10.0
Total formal votes		2,851	95.7	N/A
Informal votes		122	4.3	N/A
Turnout		2,973	74.5	N/A
Two-party-preferred result
Country Liberal	Mike Reed	2,124	74.5	+4.4
Labor	Michael Pierce	727	25.5	−4.4
Country Liberal hold		Swing	+4.4	

=== Elections in the 2000s ===
2001 Northern Territory general election: Katherine
Party	Candidate	Votes	%	±%
Country Liberal	Mike Reed	1,596	52.2	−17.7
Labor	Michael Peirce	794	26.0	+4.9
Independent	Tony Coutts	327	10.7	+10.7
One Nation	Rob Phillips	299	9.8	+9.8
Independent	John Donnellan	40	1.3	+1.3
Total formal votes		3,056	96.8	N/A
Informal votes		100	3.2	N/A
Turnout		3,156	82.8	N/A
Two-party-preferred result
Country Liberal	Mike Reed	1,970	64.5	−9.8
Labor	Michael Peirce	1,086	35.5	+9.8
Country Liberal hold		Swing	−9.8	

2003 Katherine by-election
Party	Candidate	Votes	%	±%
Country Liberal	Fay Miller	1,231	41.9	−10.3
Labor	Sharon Hillen	955	32.5	+6.5
Independent	Jim Forscutt	524	17.8	+17.8
Independent	Markus Bader	120	4.1	+4.1
Independent	Peter Byers	111	3.8	+3.8
Total formal votes		2,941	95.7	−1.1
Informal votes		133	4.3	+1.1
Turnout		3,074	75.8	−7.0
Two-party-preferred result
Country Liberal	Fay Miller	1,596	54.3	−10.2
Labor	Sharon Hillen	1,345	45.7	+10.2
Country Liberal hold		Swing		

2005 Northern Territory general election: Katherine
Party	Candidate	Votes	%	±%
Country Liberal	Fay Miller	1,930	52.6	−1.3
Labor	Sharon Hillen	1,736	47.4	+21.7
Total formal votes		3,666	96.5	N/A
Informal votes		133	3.5	N/A
Turnout		3,799	81.8	N/A
Country Liberal hold		Swing	−12.7	

2008 Northern Territory general election: Katherine
Party	Candidate	Votes	%	±%
Country Liberal	Willem Westra van Holthe	1,836	50.9	−1.7
Labor	Sharon Hillen	1,131	31.4	−15.8
Independent	Toni Tapp Coutts	638	17.7	+17.7
Total formal votes		3,605	96.6	N/A
Informal votes		126	3.4	N/A
Turnout		3,731	75.8	N/A
Two-party-preferred result
Country Liberal	Willem Westra van Holthe	2,106	58.4	+5.7
Labor	Sharon Hillen	1,499	41.6	−5.7
Country Liberal hold		Swing	+5.7	

=== Elections in the 2010s ===
2012 Northern Territory general election: Katherine
Party	Candidate	Votes	%	±%
Country Liberal	Willem Westra van Holthe	2,729	66.1	+15.1
Labor	Cerise King	864	20.9	−10.5
Independent	Teresa Cummings	537	13.0	+13.0
Total formal votes		4,130	98.2	N/A
Informal votes		77	1.8	N/A
Turnout		4,207	81.3	N/A
Two-party-preferred result
Country Liberal	Willem Westra van Holthe	2,984	72.3	+13.8
Labor	Cerise King	1,146	27.7	−13.8
Country Liberal hold		Swing	+13.8	

2016 Northern Territory general election: Katherine
Party	Candidate	Votes	%	±%
Country Liberal	Willem Westra van Holthe	1,434	35.2	−30.9
Labor	Sandra Nelson	1,274	31.3	+10.4
1 Territory	Braedon Earley	744	18.3	+18.3
Independent	Dean David	285	7.0	+7.0
Shooters and Fishers	Chris Righton	278	6.8	+6.8
Independent	Leon Cellier	58	1.4	+1.4
Total formal votes		4,073	98.4	N/A
Informal votes		66	1.6	N/A
Turnout		4,139	78.3	N/A
Two-party-preferred result
Labor	Sandra Nelson	1,843	50.5	+22.7
Country Liberal	Willem Westra van Holthe	1,810	49.5	−22.7
Labor gain from Country Liberal		Swing	+22.7	

=== Elections in the 2020s ===
2020 Northern Territory general election: Katherine
Party	Candidate	Votes	%	±%
Labor	Kate Ganley	1,281	33.0	+2.1
Country Liberal	Jo Hersey	1,264	32.5	−1.7
Territory Alliance	Melanie Usher	1,132	29.1	+29.1
Independent	Clinton Booth	209	5.4	+5.4
Total formal votes		3,886	96.3	N/A
Informal votes		151	3.7	N/A
Turnout		4,037	70.2	N/A
Two-party-preferred result
Country Liberal	Jo Hersey	2,041	52.5	+4.1
Labor	Kate Ganley	1,845	47.5	−4.1
Country Liberal gain from Labor		Swing	+4.1	

2024 Northern Territory general election: Katherine
Party	Candidate	Votes	%	±%
Country Liberal	Jo Hersey	2,181	56.9	+24.4
Independent	Sam Phelan	1,071	28.0	+28.0
Labor	Nick Lovering	578	15.1	−17.9
Total formal votes		3,830	96.6	
Informal votes		136	3.4	
Turnout		3,966	64.2	
Two-party-preferred result (Note: Estimated two-party-preferred count by Antony Green.)
Country Liberal	Jo Hersey	2,673	69.8	+17.5
Labor	Nick Lovering	1,157	30.2	−17.5
Two-candidate-preferred result
Country Liberal	Jo Hersey	2,381	62.2	+9.6
Independent	Sam Phelan	1,449	37.8	+37.8
Country Liberal hold		Swing	+9.6	
