= Uralla, Northern Territory =

Uralla Katherine, Northern Territory
- Coordinates: 14°29′09″S 132°19′12″E
- Population: 142 (2016 census)
- Postcode(s): 0852
- Time zone: ACST (UTC+9:30)
- Location: 5 km (3 mi) from Katherine
- LGA(s): Katherine Town Council
- Territory electorate(s): Katherine
- Federal division(s): Lingiari
Suburbs around Uralla:
| Katherine South | Katherine South; Katherine East; Lansdowne | Lansdowne |
| Katherine South | Uralla | Tindal |
| Manbulloo | Manbulloo | Tindal |
- Footnotes: Adjoining localities

Uralla is a suburb on the outskirts of Katherine, Northern Territory, Australia. It is within the Katherine Town Council local government area. The area was officially defined as a suburb in April 2007, adopting the name of an agricultural lease first taken up in 1961 and later subdivided to form the present day suburb. Uralla is characterised by small farms and rural-residential development.
