= Douglas-Daly, Northern Territory =

Douglas-Daly Northern Territory
- Coordinates: 13°47′44″S 131°31′33″E
- Population: 238 (2016 census) (Note: For the 2016 census, the State Suburb of Douglas-Daly consisted of both the localities of Douglas-Daly and Fleming.)
- Established: 4 April 2007
- Postcode(s): 0822
- Elevation: 43 m (141 ft)
- Time zone: ACST (UTC+9:30)
- Location: 154 km (96 mi) S of Darwin City
- LGA(s): Victoria Daly Region; Unincorporated area
- Territory electorate(s): Daly
- Federal division(s): Lingiari
| Mean max temp | Mean min temp | Annual rainfall |
| 34.4 °C; 94 °F | 19.7 °C; 67 °F | 1,245.8 mm 49 in |
Suburbs around Douglas-Daly:
| Robin Falls | Robin Falls; Margaret River; Burrundie | Burrundie; Kakadu |
| Tipperary | Douglas-Daly | Kakadu; Pine Creek; Edith; Claravale |
| Nemarluk | Nemarluk; Claravale | Claravale |
- Footnotes: Locations; Adjoining localities (Note: The locality of Douglas-Daly fully surrounds the locality of Fleming.)

Douglas-Daly is a locality in the Northern Territory of Australia located about 154 kilometres (96 mi) south of the territory capital of Darwin.

Douglas-Daly consists of land associated with the catchments of the Daly and the Douglas Rivers and which is located between the towns of Adelaide River and Pine Creek and to the respective south and west of these towns. The Daly River forms part of the locality's boundary on its south-western side while the alignment of the Adelaide-Darwin Railway coincides in places with its north-eastern boundary. It is named after the Daly and Douglas Rivers. The term Douglas-Daly is reported by the official source as being widely used locally. Its boundaries and name were gazetted on 4 April 2007.

The 2016 Australian census which was conducted in August 2016 reports that Douglas-Daly and the locality of Fleming shared a population of 238 people.

Douglas-Daly is located within the federal division of Lingiari, the territory electoral division of Daly and partly within the local government area of the Victoria Daly Region and partly within the unincorporated areas of the Northern Territory.

== Heritage places ==
Douglas-Daly includes the following places which have added to the Northern Territory Heritage Register:

1. Brocks Creek Township, Railway Siding & Military Detention Barracks
2. Brocks Creek Chinatown and Temple Site
3. WWII Fenton Airfield
4. 12 Mile Chinatown (Settlement and Battery)
5. Burrundie Explosives Magazines
6. Grove Hill Hotel
7. Cypress Pine Overland Telegraph Poles (via Pine Creek)
8. Spring Hill Battery Complex
9. Brocks Creek Cemetery
10. Butterfly Gorge
11. WWII B24-D Liberator 'Nothing Sacred'
12. The Shackle

== Climate ==
Climate data for Douglas River Research Farm, elevation 43 m (141 ft), (1995–2020 normals, extremes 1968–present)
| Month | Jan | Feb | Mar | Apr | May | Jun | Jul | Aug | Sep | Oct | Nov | Dec | Year |
|---|---|---|---|---|---|---|---|---|---|---|---|---|---|
| Record high °C (°F) | 40.1 (104.2) | 39.5 (103.1) | 38.9 (102.0) | 39.8 (103.6) | 38.4 (101.1) | 37.2 (99.0) | 36.8 (98.2) | 38.7 (101.7) | 40.7 (105.3) | 44.1 (111.4) | 43.1 (109.6) | 41.7 (107.1) | 44.1 (111.4) |
| Mean daily maximum °C (°F) | 33.8 (92.8) | 33.7 (92.7) | 34.2 (93.6) | 34.7 (94.5) | 33.4 (92.1) | 31.6 (88.9) | 32.1 (89.8) | 33.7 (92.7) | 37.1 (98.8) | 38.0 (100.4) | 36.9 (98.4) | 35.0 (95.0) | 34.5 (94.1) |
| Mean daily minimum °C (°F) | 24.1 (75.4) | 23.9 (75.0) | 23.3 (73.9) | 20.8 (69.4) | 17.0 (62.6) | 14.1 (57.4) | 13.4 (56.1) | 14.3 (57.7) | 19.0 (66.2) | 22.5 (72.5) | 23.7 (74.7) | 24.2 (75.6) | 20.0 (68.0) |
| Record low °C (°F) | 18.2 (64.8) | 18.6 (65.5) | 11.6 (52.9) | 10.0 (50.0) | 5.5 (41.9) | 3.7 (38.7) | 2.0 (35.6) | 2.5 (36.5) | 4.5 (40.1) | 11.5 (52.7) | 14.2 (57.6) | 16.4 (61.5) | 2.0 (35.6) |
| Average rainfall mm (inches) | 308.1 (12.13) | 296.3 (11.67) | 212.9 (8.38) | 54.9 (2.16) | 7.2 (0.28) | 0.2 (0.01) | 0.2 (0.01) | 1.8 (0.07) | 4.9 (0.19) | 39.6 (1.56) | 128.6 (5.06) | 251.8 (9.91) | 1,306.5 (51.43) |
| Average rainy days (≥ 1.0 mm) | 15.1 | 14.4 | 11.5 | 3.7 | 0.7 | 0.1 | 0.1 | 0.2 | 0.7 | 3.6 | 8.3 | 13.0 | 71.4 |
Source: Australian Bureau of Meteorology (rain 1991-2020)
