= Nemarluk, Northern Territory =

Nemarluk Northern Territory
- Coordinates: 14°02′39″S 130°08′28″E
- Population: 131 (2016 census)
- Established: 4 April 2007
- Postcode(s): 0822
- Time zone: ACST (UTC+9:30)
- Location: 210 km (130 mi) SW of Darwin City
- LGA(s): Victoria Daly Region; West Daly Region
- Territory electorate(s): Daly
- Federal division(s): Lingiari
Mean max temp	Mean min temp	Annual rainfall
33.6 °C; 92 °F	25.5 °C; 78 °F	1,317.8 mm 51.9 in
Suburbs around Nemarluk:
Timor Sea	Rakula	Rakula
Timor Sea; Thamarrurr; Nganmarriyanga; Thamarrurr	Nemarluk	Daly River; Tipperary; Douglas-Daly; Claravale
Bradshaw	Bradshaw	Bradshaw
- Footnotes: Locations; Adjoining localities

Nemarluk is a locality in the Northern Territory of Australia located about 210 kilometres (130 mi) south-west of the territorial capital of Darwin.

It consists of land bounded in part by the Daly River and the Timor Sea in the north and north-west respectively, in part by the Fitzmaurice River in the south, and in part again by the Daly River in the east.

Nemarluk is named in commemoration of Nemarluk (circa 1911 -1940), an aboriginal man notable as an “Indigenous resistance fighter”, a murderer and as a prisoner. The locality's boundaries and name were gazetted on 4 April 2007.

The 2016 Australian census which was conducted in August 2016 reports that Nemarluk had 131 people living within its boundaries.

Nemarluk is located within the federal division of Lingiari, the territory electoral division of Daly and the local government areas of the Victoria Daly Region and the West Daly Region.
