= Delamere, Northern Territory =

Delamere Northern Territory
- Coordinates: 15°19′45″S 131°36′12″E
- Population: 37 (2016 census)
  - Density: 0.00324/km^{2} (0.00840/sq mi)
- Established: 4 April 2007
- Postcode(s): 0852
- Elevation: 221 m (725 ft)(weather station)
- Area: 11,404 km^{2} (4,403.1 sq mi)
- Time zone: ACST (UTC+9:30)
- Location: 369 km (229 mi) S of Darwin
- LGA(s): Victoria Daly Region
- Territory electorate(s): Stuart
- Federal division(s): Lingiari
Mean max temp	Mean min temp	Annual rainfall
34.0 °C; 93 °F	20.9 °C; 70 °F	854.4 mm 33.6 in
Suburbs around Delamere:
Claravale	Claravale; Florina	Florina
Bradshaw; Gregory	Delamere	Florina; Manbulloo; Sturt Plateau
Victoria River	Victoria River	Sturt Plateau
- Footnotes: Adjoining localities

Delamere is a locality in the Northern Territory of Australia about 369 kilometres (229 mi) south of the territory capital of Darwin.

The locality consists of the following land (from north to south):

1. The Aroona and Scott Creek pastoral leases,
2. The Willeroo, Mathison Station, Stapleton Station and Dixie Station pastoral leases, and
3. The Delamere pastoral lease, the Delamere Air Weapons Range and land identified as NT Portion 2119.

As of 2020, it has an area of 11,404 square kilometres (4,403 sq mi).

The locality's boundaries and name were gazetted on 4 April 2007. Its name is derived from the Delamere Station and ultimately from the name of the South Australian home of Dr WJ Browne, a former leaseholder.

The Victoria Highway passes through the locality from the Stuart Highway in the east to the Western Australian border in the west. The Buntine Highway passes through the locality from the south and terminates at the Victoria Highway near the Willeroo homestead.

The Delamere Air Weapons Range occupies land in the locality's south-east corner on the east side of the Buntine Highway. The following aboriginal communities are located within Delamere – Djarrung which is located on Scott Creek Station in the locality's north and Dillinya which is located in NT Portion 2119 in the locality's south-east.

The 2016 Australian census which was conducted in August 2016 reports that Delamere had a population of 37 people.

Delamere is located within the federal division of Lingiari, the territory electoral division of Stuart and the local government area of the Victoria Daly Region.
