= Daly River =

Daly River may refer to:

- Daly River, Northern Territory, a town
- Daly River (Northern Territory), a river
