= Daly River Road =

Daly River Road Northern Territory
- Daly River Road (purple)

General information
- Type: Road
- Length: 251 km (156 mi)
- Route number(s): State Route 28

Major junctions
- Northeast end: Dorat Road (State Route 23), near Robin Falls
- Southwest end: Port Keats Road (State Route 28), Daly River

Location(s)
- Major suburbs: Litchfield Park, Daly River, Peppimenarti

The Daly River Road is a designated state route in the Northern Territory of Australia providing access to the settlements of Daly River (Nauiyu), Peppimenarti and Wadeye (Port Keats). The road was upgraded and sealed between Dorat Road and Daly River (approximately 77 km (48 mi)), skirting the southern boundary of Litchfield National Park in late 2007 to allow better access for an increasing volume of tourist traffic heading into the region, known for good fishing during the dry season. The remaining distance between the Daly River crossing and Wadeye remains unsealed and suitable for four-wheel drive vehicles depending on weather conditions.

In 2011, the Northern Territory Government began construction of a new bridge crossing the Daly River. The cost of the project was reportedly valued at $22.6 million, involving a new 184m span carrying a pedestrian path and a single lane roadway across the river on a higher level and straighter alignment than the existing crossing, providing better year round access. The bridge has been designed to allow an additional lane to be added to the roadway should the need arise.
