= Katherine East, Northern Territory =

Katherine East Katherine, Northern Territory
- Coordinates: 14.4662°S 132.2852°E
- Population: 3,114 (2016 census)
  - Density: 151.24/km^{2} (391.71/sq mi)
- Postcode(s): 0850
- Area: 20.59 km^{2} (7.9 sq mi)
- Location: 2.8 km (2 mi) from Katherine
- LGA(s): Katherine Town Council
- Territory electorate(s): Katherine
- Federal division(s): Lingiari
Suburbs around Katherine East:
Katherine	Lansdowne
Katherine	Katherine East
Katherine South	Uralla	Uralla

Katherine East is an eastern suburb of the town of Katherine, Northern Territory, Australia. It is in the local government area of the Katherine Town Council. The area was officially defined as a suburb in April 2007, adopting the commonly used local name for the residential subdivisions east of the town centre. It has been identified as the focus of future residential development as required by population growth in the town. Development in Katherine East is mainly residential north of Stuart Highway, with a small industrial area to the south.

== Services and facilities ==
Within Katherine East there are two public primary schools - Macfarlane Primary School and Casuarina Street Primary School, as well as Katherine High School. St Joseph's Catholic College is also located in Katherine East catering for students from Transition to Year 12. The regional headquarters for the Northern Territory Police, Fire and Emergency Services is located opposite the industrial area along the Stuart Highway. Medium and long term planning has also identified a site within the suburb for a future health precinct as the current Katherine District Hospital has been subject to inundation during the 1998 and 2006 flood events.

Katherine East is also the location of the Godinymayin Yijard Rivers Arts & Culture Centre which opened in 2012, and serves as a community and creative hub for the entire Big Rivers Region. The facility programmes visual art exhibitions, performing arts, lectures, and conferences, and also hosts a wide range of hired events and civic functions. Godinymayin, also known locally as Godi, provides exhibition space to share Indigenous culture, visual and performance art. The centre includes gallery space, retail shop, cafe, and a 400-seat theatre. In 2022, following a $5 million Arts Trail Grant from the Northern Territory Government, the centre will expand its interior venue and add a new outdoor amphitheatre for live events and dry season activities.
