= Dorat Road =

Road in Northern Territory, Australia

Dorat Road Northern Territory

General information
- Type: Road
- Length: 65 km (40 mi)
- Route number(s): State Route 23

Major junctions
- North end: Stuart Highway (National Highway 1), Adelaide River
- Daly River Road (State Route 28)
- South end: Stuart Highway (National Highway 1), Hayes Creek

Dorat Road is a designated state route in the Northern Territory of Australia providing an alternative route to the Stuart Highway from Adelaide River and rejoining north of Hayes Creek, a distance of 65 km (40 mi). The road provides access to tourist attractions including Robin Falls and Douglas-Daly Hot Springs, several World War II heritage locations, and forms part of the road access to Daly River and Wadeye via the Daly River Road which branches from Dorat Road approximately 31 km (19 mi) south of Adelaide River.

Dorat Road was originally constructed during World War II as part of the original Stuart Highway alignment, which was later bypassed owing to steep climbs and tight curves along the route. In the 1960s most bridges and floodways were resurfaced, and the entire length is currently sealed. In 1987 the current name was gazetted, taken from the acronym D.O.R.A.T. (Darwin Overland Road Authorities Transport), an organisation formed in 1942 by state transport authorities of Victoria, South Australia and New South Wales to transport materials used in the construction of the Stuart Highway from the then railhead at Alice Springs. With the adoption of a state route numbering system of rural roads maintained by the Northern Territory Government in the same year, Dorat Road was designated and signposted as state route 23.
