= Grove Hill =

Grove Hill may refer to:

== Australia ==
- Grove Hill, Northern Territory

== United Kingdom ==
- Grove Hill, Middlesbrough, North Yorkshire
- Grove Hill, Hemel Hempstead, Hertfordshire

== United States ==
- Grove Hill, Alabama, a town
  - Grove Hill Courthouse Square Historic District
  - Grove Hill Municipal Airport
- Grove Hill, Virginia

== See also ==
- Grove Hill Cemetery, a cemetery in Waltham, Massachusetts
- Grove Hill Mansion, a historic mansion in Northampton, Massachusetts
