= Liam Patrick =

Australian rules footballer (born 1988)

Personal information
- Nicknames: The Flash, Lajamanu Lightning Bolt
- Born: 4 March 1988 (age 38); Lajamanu, Northern Territory
- Original team: Wanderers (NTFL)
- Draft: Zone Selection, Gold Coast
- Height: 189 cm (6 ft 2 in)
- Weight: 71.9 kg (159 lb)
- Position: Forward

Playing career^{1}
Years	Club	Games (Goals)
2011–2013	Gold Coast	13 (6)
- ^{1} Playing statistics correct to the end of 2013.

Liam Patrick (born 4 March 1988) is an Australian rules footballer who was picked up by Gold Coast as a zone selection after the 2009 National Draft. He made his debut against Essendon in round 6 of 2011 season.

== Early life ==
Patrick was born in Lajamanu, Northern Territory into an Indigenous family and is the second eldest of three children. Upon moving to the Gold Coast at the end of 2009 at the age of 21 he left behind his girlfriend and son to chase his dream of becoming an AFL player.

== Junior Football ==
Patrick began playing junior football at the Lajamanu Football Club who compete in the Katherine District Football League. After being a part of the premiership winning team at the Lajamanu Swans in 2008 he began playing for the Wanderers Football Club in the Northern Territory Football League in 2009. Despite not being drafted in the 2009 AFL draft he was signed by the Gold Coast Football Club as a zone selection and competed in the 2010 VFL season for the newly formed club. He finished the 2010 season with 9 goals from 9 games and proved enough to be a part of the inaugural AFL season for the Gold Coast.

== AFL career ==
Patrick made his AFL debut in round 6 of the 2011 AFL season. In his second game for the Gold Coast he kicked two goals in the Suns victory over the Brisbane Lions in the first QClash. He would only manage one more AFL game for the year and spent the rest of the 2011 season in the reserves. His 2012 season also began in the reserves but after a mid-season trip home to Lajamanu Patrick would play in 8 consecutive games for the Suns before a hamstring injury ended his season. In October 2012 he was offered a one-year extension at the Gold Coast Suns.

== Post AFL ==
Patrick returned to his home club of Northern Warlpiri (Lajamanu) in what is now the Big Rivers Football League. He often coaches, team manages and plays for the club. He is also on the clubs committee, whilst living back in the community.
