= West Daly Regional Council =

- Local government area
- Interactive map of West Daly Regional Council
- Coordinates: 14°14′S 129°31′E
- Country: Australia
- State: Northern Territory
- Region: Top End
- Established: 1 July 2014
- Council seat: Wadeye

Government
  - Mayor: March 2022 Election
  - Territory electorate: Daly
  - Federal division: Lingiari

Area
  - Total: 14,070 km^{2} (5,430 sq mi)

Population
  - Total: 3,649 (2018)
  - Density: 0.25935/km^{2} (0.6717/sq mi)
- Website: West Daly Regional Council
LGAs around West Daly Regional Council
Timor Sea	Unincorporated Top End Region	Unincorporated Top End Region
Timor Sea	West Daly Regional Council	Victoria Daly
Timor Sea	Victoria Daly	Victoria Daly

The West Daly Regional Council is a local government area of the Northern Territory, Australia. The shire covers an area of 14,070 square kilometres (5,430 sq mi) and had a population of 3,649 in June 2018, with over 90% identifying as Aboriginal. During the wet season between late November and early May, travel between the three main communities of Nganmarriyanga, Peppimenarti and Wadeye is limited to air as roads are cut by flooding.

== History ==
The West Daly Region came into existence on 1 July 2014 when the boundaries on the western side of the Victoria Daly Region were changed with the effect that the following three wards from the Victoria Daly Region were transferred to the new local government area - Nganmarriyanga, Thamarrurr/Pindi Pindi and Tyemirri.

== Wards ==
The West Daly Regional Council is divided into the following three wards which are represented by a total of six councillors:

- Nganmarriyanga (one councillor)
- Thamamurr/Pindi Pindi (four councillors)
- Tyemirri (one councillor)

== Localities and communities ==
Community	Population	Map
Nemarluk (Note: Only the western side of Nemarluk is in the West Daly Region.)	305 (SAL 2021)	
Nganmarriyanga (Palumpa)	364 (SAL 2021)	
Peppimentari	190 (SAL 2021)	
Thamarrurr	188 (SAL 2021)	
Wadeye (Port Keats)	1,924 (SAL 2021)	
