= Peppimenarti, Northern Territory =

Peppimenarti
- Town
- Coordinates: 14°9′21″S 130°4′54″E
- Country: Australia
- State: Northern Territory
- LGA: West Daly Region
- Location: 250 km (160 mi) SW of Darwin; 134 km (83 mi) NE of Wadeye

Government
  - Territory electorate: Daly
  - Federal division: Lingiari

Population
  - Total: 178 (2016 census)
- Postcode: 0822

Peppimenarti is an Aboriginal Australian community in the Daly River region of the Northern Territory, Australia. Peppimenarti (or "Peppi", as it is known) is situated on Tom Turner Creek approximately 320 kilometres (200 mi) south-west of Darwin. The population in the 2016 Census was 178.

Emu Point, an outstation, is approximately 38 km (24 mi) from Peppimenarti.

== Etymology ==
The locality name is drawn from the Aboriginal words peppi (rock) and menarti (large), referring to the rock formation that overlooks the community. At its base is a wide stream and a series of pools which form a significant sacred site.

== History ==
In the early 1970s, the independent Aboriginal organisation Unia campaigned for the establishment of a cattle station within the Daly River Aboriginal Reserve as a permanent home for the local Ngangikurrunggurr people. As a result, a 2,000 square kilometres (772 sq mi) pastoral lease was granted, and later consolidated by the Northern Territory Aboriginal Land Rights Act 1976.

Harold Wilson, a prominent member of Unia, was instrumental in the community's establishment. Wilson was born in Peppimenarti country, and after being removed from his family and sent to government institutions as a child, he decided to return there as an adult with his wife Regina Pilawuk Wilson and family, to set up a permanent settlement. He later became the President of the Peppimenarti Association and used his Aboriginal and European heritage to negotiate the ‘translation of Aboriginal needs into European contexts while preserving authentic Aboriginal voices in the decision making process’.

== Description ==
Peppimenarti is situated on Tom Turner Creek around 320 kilometres (200 mi) south-west of Darwin. is 120 kilometres (75 mi) west of the Daly River crossing along the Port Keats Road. There is road access to Peppimenarti seven months of the year, with the remainder being flooded during the wet season, or roads in too poor condition to drive on. The only access to Peppimenarti during the wet season is via plane. The mail plane flies to the community once a week.

The outstation (or homeland) of Emu Point, established not long after Peppimenarti, is located around 38 km (24 mi) from Peppi.

The main language spoken in Peppimenarti is Tyemirri, a dialect of Nganʼgityemerri, with English being the second most predominant in the area. At the 2006 census, Peppimenarti had a population of 185.

== Artistic heritage ==
A group of artists from the community launched an art program named Durrmu Arts in 2001. Durrmu Arts is now renowned for its contemporary acrylic painting and fibre weaving work. Regina Pilawuk Wilson and fellow artist Teresa Lemon took part in the 2003 Pacific Arts Festival in Nouméa and have since been included in numerous exhibitions both in Australia and internationally. Wilson won the General Painting Prize at the 2003 Telstra National Aboriginal & Torres Strait Islander Art Award. In 2009, Wilson's work was included in Against Exclusion: Third Moscow Biennale of Contemporary Art, curated by Jean-Martin Hubert. Her paintings were also included in the exhibition Dreaming their Way at the National Museum for Women in the Arts, Washington DC, USA. In 2016–19, Wilson's work was included in the exhibition Marking the Infinite: Contemporary Women Artists from Aboriginal Australia, which toured to five museums in the US and Canada.

Slim Dusty has a popular country song titled "Plains of Peppimenarti" where he sings that Peppimenarti is "one place I really like to go".
