= Grove Hill, Northern Territory =

Former centre for mining operations in Northern Territory, Australia

Grove Hill Northern Territory
- Coordinates: 13°28′43″S 131°33′51″E
- Established: 1872
- Postcode(s): 0822
- Location: 181 km (112 mi) SE of Darwin; 68 km (42 mi) SE of Adelaide River; 62 km (39 mi) NW of Pine Creek
- LGA(s): Victoria Daly Regional Council

Grove Hill is a ghost town in the Northern Territory of Australia. Once a centre for mining operations, today only a hotel with a few outbuildings survive. Grove Hill is located within the Victoria Daly Region and for administrative purposes is considered to be part of the locality of Burrundie. Both the defunct North Australia Railway and the modern Adelaide–Darwin railway pass through Grove Hill.

== History ==
Settlement of Grove Hill began after the discovery of gold by prospector Harry Roberts in 1872 during construction of the Overland Telegraph. A stamping battery became operational on 6 June 1887 and was used to crush stone from surrounding mines.

Grove Hill was formerly a siding on the North Australia Railway where a 2 ft gauge steam tramway some 12 miles in length was constructed in 1904 to connect the nearby Mount Ellison and Iron Blow mines met the main line, with a dual gauge section allowing main line wagons to be hauled to the private smelting works. The Iron Blow mine, located 2 mi (3.2 km) south of the siding produced gold until its abandonment in 1914. The area surrounding the mine was surveyed by the Australian Government in 1960 after reports that there remained 33,000 tons of mineral ore available for extraction.

Prior to 1935, a township and miners camp had thrived approximately 4 km (2.5 mi) south of the railway line. As the gold rush was ending, this settlement was abandoned and a hotel constructed near the railway sidings to take advantage of new business opportunities brought by travelers passing through the area.

The remains of the settlement were further isolated in by the closure of the railway line in 1976 and was bypassed by the Stuart Highway when it was upgraded to National Highway standard between 1970 and 1992, passing 15 km (9.3 mi), with the former road alignment now forming part of the Northern Goldfields Loop tourist drive.

=== Grove Hill Hotel ===
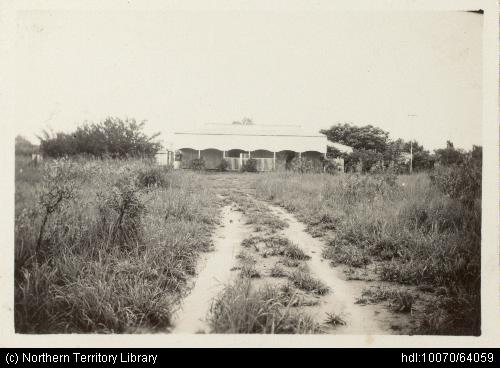
Grove Hill pub in February 1942

The Grove Hill Hotel was built in 1934 from materials scavenged from abandoned mining sites in the aftermath of the Great Depression. It remained operating as a licensed hotel until 2018 and also incorporated a heritage museum displaying historical artifacts from the local area. The hotel was renowned for birdwatching nearby. The hotel was listed in the Northern Territory Heritage Register on 2 November 1994.

The historic hotel was listed for sale by auction on 12 July 2012 with a reserve price of $760,000, attracting widespread media coverage. In November 2016, after falling to attract a serious buyer the hotel announced it would close, however it reopened a few months later in response to community support and an extension of its liquor licence. Following a decline in business and the owner's retirement, the Grove Hill Hotel closed once again in October 2018 and has not been open to the public since.

== See also ==
- List of ghost towns
