= Florina, Northern Territory =

Florina Katherine, Northern Territory
- Coordinates: 14°31′00″S 131°54′00″E
- Population: 97 (2016 census)
- Postcode(s): 0852
- Time zone: ACST (UTC+9:30)
- Location: 35 km (22 mi) W of Katherine
- LGA(s): Katherine Town Council
- Territory electorate(s): Katherine
- Federal division(s): Lingiari

Florina is a rural locality in the Northern Territory, Australia. It is located within the Katherine Town Council local government area, approximately 35 km (22 mi) west of Katherine via Florina Road. The locality was officially defined in April 2007, named for Florina Station, the first European settlement in the area.
