= Fleming, Northern Territory =

Fleming Northern Territory
- Coordinates: 13°51′02″S 131°17′48″E
- Population: No entry (2016 census) (Note: For the 2016 census, any people living in the locality of Fleming were counted by the Australian Bureau of Statistics as part of the count for the locality of Douglas-Daly.)
- Established: 20 March 1996 (town); 4 April 2007 (locality)
- Postcode(s): 0822
- Time zone: ACST (UTC+9:30)
- Location: 162 km (101 mi) S of Darwin
- LGA(s): Victoria Daly Region
- Territory electorate(s): Daly
- Federal division(s): Lingiari
Mean max temp	Mean min temp	Annual rainfall
34.4 °C; 94 °F	19.7 °C; 67 °F	1,245.8 mm 49 in
Localities around Fleming:
Douglas-Daly	Douglas-Daly	Douglas-Daly
Douglas-Daly	Fleming	Douglas-Daly
Douglas-Daly	Douglas-Daly	Douglas-Daly
- Footnotes: Locations; Adjoining localities

Fleming is a town and locality in the Northern Territory of Australia located about 162 kilometres (101 mi) south of the territory's capital of Darwin.

The locality is named after the town, which was named after the brothers, Jim and Mike Fleming, who are considered to be the first pastoralists in this part of the Northern Territory. Part of the town was established on land partly located in the former Oolloo Station pastoral lease established by Jim Fleming in 1907. The town was gazetted on 20 March 1996 and the locality was gazetted on 4 April 2007.

For the 2016 Australian census which was conducted in August 2016, the population of the locality of Fleming (if any) was counted with that in the surrounding locality of Douglas-Daly to find that 238 people were living within the two localities. (Note: Refer footnote 1 above)

Fleming is located within the federal division of Lingiari, the territory electoral division of Daly and the local government area of the Victoria Daly Shire.
