= Nganmarriyanga, Northern Territory =

Nganmarriyanga Northern Territory
- Coordinates: 14°19′47″S 129°53′15″E
- Population: 427 (2016 census)
- Postcode(s): 0822
- Elevation: 8 m (26 ft)
- Location: 362 km (225 mi) from Darwin
- LGA(s): West Daly Regional Council
- Territory electorate(s): Daly
- Federal division(s): Lingiari

Nganmarriyanga, formerly known as Palumpa, is an Aboriginal community in the Daly River region of the Northern Territory, Australia.

== History ==
Nganmarriyanga is an Aboriginal community that was originally established as Palumpa, the name of an adjoining cattle station. This station was established after the Second World War to provide supplies to nearby communities, including Wadeye. Its name was changed from Palumpa at the request of the Community Council.

It was founded by the Wodidj family, which left the area after a period of initial contact with white Australian settlers before World War II. They left the area, with the men seeking work on cattle stations in northern Western Australia, returning to the nearby Port Keats Mission (now Wadeye) after the war. They then moved to the present location and started building the community. They cut timber, built fences, dug trenches to pipe water from the creeks, and ran cattle which were sold to people at nearby communities.

During the 1980s the population of Palumpa grew, and in 1985 Palumpa Community Inc. was formed as a local governing body, and raised funds for building infrastructure.

== Governance ==
Nganmarriyanga was in the Victoria Daly Shire when it was established, but was moved into the new local government area of West Daly Region when it was established in 2014

The community falls under the auspices of the Northern Land Council.

== Location and access ==
Nganmarriyanga lies131 km (81 mi) west of the Daly River crossing along the Port Keats Road. There is road access around eight months of the year, usually from May until December. During the wet season, the area is only accessible via plane because the roads are impassable due to regular flooding.

In late February to early March 2023, heavy rains fell over the area. The upper Victoria River exceeded major flood levels, and evacuations were ordered for residents of Daguragu, Kalkarindji, Pigeon Hole, and Palumpa.

== Demographics ==
Nganmarriyanga's population was recorded as 427 in the 2021 Australian census. The main language spoken in Nganmarriyanga is Murrinh-patha.

== Activities and facilities ==
Palumpa Station continues as a proprietary limited company run by the traditional owners, with a new abattoir built in the 2020s, and is a major employer of local Aboriginal men.

People at Palumpa like to hunt bullock, turtle, goose, goanna, cat-fish, kangaroo and fish.

Nganmarriyanga Primary School has an enrolment of 130 students from preschool to Year 10.

There is a community health clinic, built in 1998 and operated by Territory Health Services.
