= Relton Roberts =

Australian rules footballer

Personal information
- Born: 1 March 1986 (age 40)
- Original teams: Euroa (GVFL); Arnhem Crows (KDFL); Wanderers (NTFL); NT Thunder (QAFL)
- Debut: 25 March 2010, Richmond vs. Carlton, at MCG
- Height: 176 cm (5 ft 9 in)
- Weight: 78 kg (172 lb)

Playing career^{1}
Years	Club	Games (Goals)
2010	Richmond	2 (0)
- ^{1} Playing statistics correct to the end of 2010.

Relton Roberts (born 1 March 1986) is a former professional Australian rules footballer who played for Richmond Football Club in the Australian Football League (AFL).

Born in Ngukurr, Northern Territory, Roberts played for a number of teams, including the Arnhem Crows in the Katherine District Football League (KDFL), Wanderers Football Club in the Darwin-based Northern Territory Football League (NTFL), NT Thunder in the Queensland Australian Football League (QAFL) and Euroa Football Club in the northern Victorian-based Goulburn Valley Football Netball League (GVFL).

Roberts was drafted by Richmond in the third round of the 2010 Rookie draft and made his senior AFL debut against Carlton in round 1 of the 2010 AFL season. He would play only once more for Richmond, when he was knocked out and after playing a handful of matches for Richmond's Victorian Football League (VFL) affiliate Coburg Football Club, where he was in trouble for breaking a night curfew and warned for eating a hamburger before a match, Roberts returned to the Northern Territory, citing homesickness.

Roberts began the 2010/11 NTFL season with Wanderers but was dropped to their reserves side after some poor performances before making a return to the senior side late in the season. Roberts was recruited for the 2012 season to Walla Walla Football Club in the southern New South Wales based Hume Football League. In 2014, Roberts turned out for Ouyen United in the Mallee Football League in north-west Victoria.
