= Goodenia leiosperma =

Scientific classification
- Kingdom: Plantae
- Clade: Embryophytes
- Clade: Tracheophytes
- Clade: Angiosperms
- Clade: Eudicots
- Clade: Asterids
- Order: Asterales
- Family: Goodeniaceae
- Genus: Goodenia
- Species: G. leiosperma

Binomial name
- Goodenia leiosperma Carolin

Species of plant

Goodenia leiosperma is a species of flowering plant in the family Goodeniaceae and is endemic to the Northern Territory. It is an ascending to low-lying herb with egg-shaped to lance-shaped stem-leaves and racemes of yellow flowers.

== Description ==
Goodenia leiosperma is an ascending to low-lying herb that has stems up to 60 cm (24 in). It has egg-shaped to lance-shaped leaves arranged along the stem, 50–100 mm (2.0–3.9 in) long and 10–20 mm (0.39–0.79 in) wide and ephemeral leaves at the base. The flowers are arranged in racemes up to 400 mm (16 in) long with leaf-like bracts, each flower on a pedicel 40–100 mm (1.6–3.9 in) long. The sepals are linear, 5–6.5 mm (0.20–0.26 in) long, the corolla yellow, 15–20 mm (0.59–0.79 in) long. The lower lobes of the corolla are 6–7.5 mm (0.24–0.30 in) long with wings about 2 mm (0.079 in) wide. Flowering mainly occurs from February to June and the fruit is a more or less spherical capsule about 8 mm (0.31 in) in diameter.

== Taxonomy and naming ==
Goodenia leiosperma was first formally described in 1990 by Roger Charles Carolin in the journal Telopea from specimens collected by George Chippendale south of Darwin in 1961.

== Distribution and habitat ==
This goodenia grows in forest in the Victoria River district and Arnhem Land in the Northern Territory.

== Conservation status ==
Goodenia leiosperma is classified as "least concern" under the Northern Territory Government Territory Parks and Wildlife Conservation Act 1976.
