= Binjari, Northern Territory =

Binjari Northern Territory
- Coordinates: 14°33′08.7″S 132°10′57.7″E
- Population: 190 (2016)
- Postcode(s): 0852
- Location: 13 km (8 mi) SW of Katherine
- LGA(s): Katherine Town Council
- Territory electorate(s): Katherine
- Federal division(s): Lingiari

Binjari is a small community in the Northern Territory of Australia. It is located about 13km southwest of Katherine. At the time of the 2016 census, it had a recorded population of 190. The Binjari Community Government Council is also a former NT local government area.

== Coronavirus pandemic ==
Binjari attracted international attention after an outbreak of COVID-19 occurred in the community in 2021. Following the detection of 9 positive cases in the small community on 20 November, the Northern Territory Government imposed a hard lockdown, requesting assistance from the Australian Defence Force with relocation and quarantine of infected persons and close contacts due to the vulnerability of the Indigenous population.

The measures implemented were some of the toughest in Australia, certainly more so than experienced by any town in the Northern Territory. Residents were not allowed to leave their homes for any reason other than for medical emergencies or where required by law. NT Police established checkpoints on the road leading in and out of the community, with Defence Personnel providing additional capacity to check vehicles.

As a result of this response, local authorities personally received critical messages from social media users as far away as the United States, claiming that the Army was forcibly removing and vaccinating Aboriginal people against their will. In some cases, the relocation of infected residents was compared to genocide and the Stolen Generations. Circulation of such misinformation complicated co-ordination of supply deliveries as well as the public health response. Despite these claims, a number of Indigenous bodies were supportive of the Territory Government's actions, including the Aboriginal Medical Services Alliance and Northern Land Council, who expressed confidence that the measures were appropriate to protect the vulnerable communities from the outbreak. Representatives of the Defence Force stated their primary role was to assist with the delivery of food, supplies and providing transport for community members to attend medical appointments.

On 3 December, an elder from the community became the first person to die of the disease in the Northern Territory. The lockdown was lifted on 8 December It was reported that of the estimated 300 people in the community at the start of the lockdown, close to 200 had been transported to the Howard Springs quarantine facility, 300 km (190 mi) away.
