= Katherine South =

- Suburb
- Coordinates: 14°28′08″S 132°15′32″E
- Country: Australia
- State: Northern Territory
- City: Katherine
- LGA: Katherine Town Council
- Location: 1 km (0.62 mi) from Katherine

Government
  - Territory electorate: Katherine
  - Federal division: Lingiari

Population
  - Total: 1,495 (2016 census)
- Postcode: 0850
Suburbs around Katherine South
	Katherine	Katherine East
Cossack	Katherine South	Uralla
Cossack

Katherine South is a suburb in the town of Katherine, Northern Territory, Australia. It is within the Katherine Town Council local government area. The area was officially defined as a suburb in April 2007, adopting the commonly used local name for the residential areas south of the Stuart Highway along the Katherine River.
