= Katherine Region =

Katherine
- Region
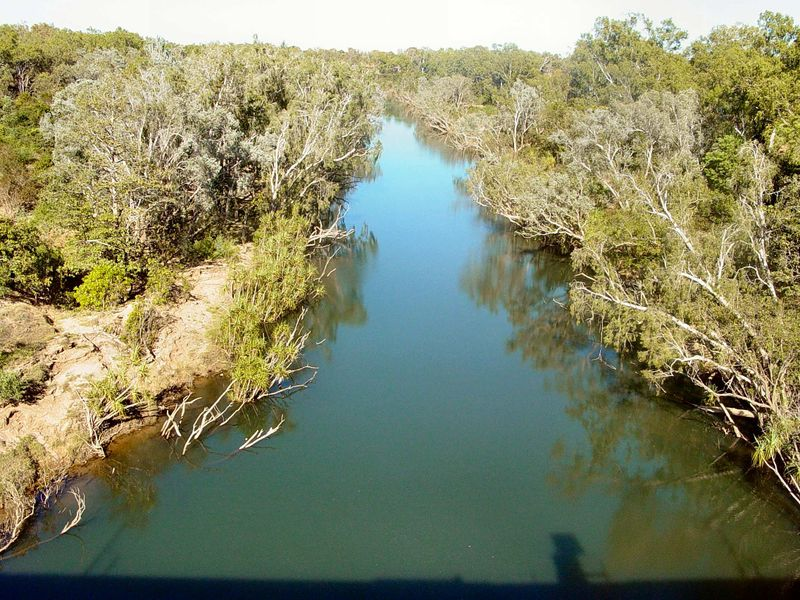
- Katherine River

- Coordinates: 14°28′0″S 132°16′0″E
- Country: Australia
- State: Northern Territory
- LGAs: Town of Katherine; Roper Gulf Region; Victoria Daly Region

Government
  - Territory electorate: Electoral division of Katherine
  - Federal division: Division of Lingiari

Area
  - Total: 336,674 km^{2} (129,991 sq mi)

Population
  - Total: 18,646 (2007)
  - Density: 0.0553830/km^{2} (0.143441/sq mi)

The Katherine Region, also known as Big River Country, is one of five major regions in the Northern Territory, Australia. It is situated just below the tropical Top End. The Katherine Region covers an area of 336,674 km^{2} (129,991 sq mi), and has a population of 18,646, making it the third-most populous region in the Northern Territory. The main centre in the region is Katherine which is the fourth-largest population centre of the territory.

== Geography ==
The region extends from the border of Western Australia to the border of Queensland and the Gulf of Carpentaria. The region borders with the Alice Springs Region and the Barkly Tableland region and to the north the Darwin Region and Arnhem Land. There are 5 major river systems within the Katherine Region, the Katherine, the Flora, the upper Daly, the Roper and the Victoria River. The Katherine Region is the major cattle producer of the Northern Territory.

The region consists of 3 shire zones, Katherine Municipality, The Victoria/Daly and the Roper/Gulf Shires.

Ecosystems of the region are diverse, from dry, open savanna woodland to tropical riverine ecosystems. Terrain includes plains and gentle slopes through to rugged sandstone escarpments, buttes, outcrops and flat-topped mesas.

The climate of the region is dry tropical savanna with distinct wet and dry seasons. Temperatures can range from occasional overnight cool snaps of 8 degrees Celsius in the middle of the dry season (April to September) to daily highs from 33 °C to 42 °C in the wet season (October to March). The wet season is the time of annual monsoon rains and vigorous electrical storms. The buildup period from October to December is the hottest time of year and can regularly experience temperature over 40 °C, accompanied with high humidity.

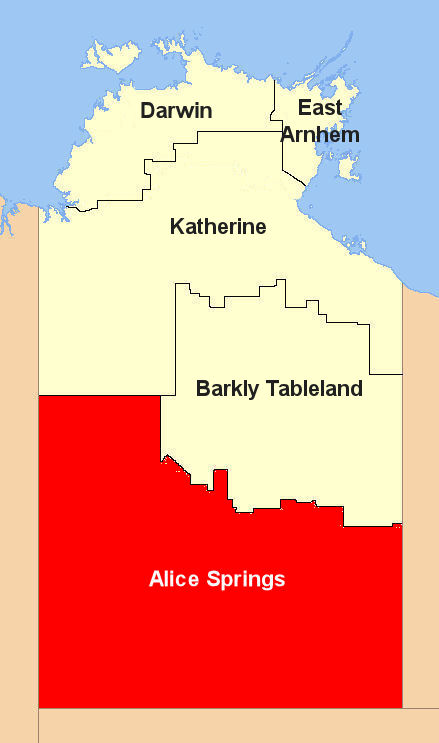
Regions of the Northern Territory.

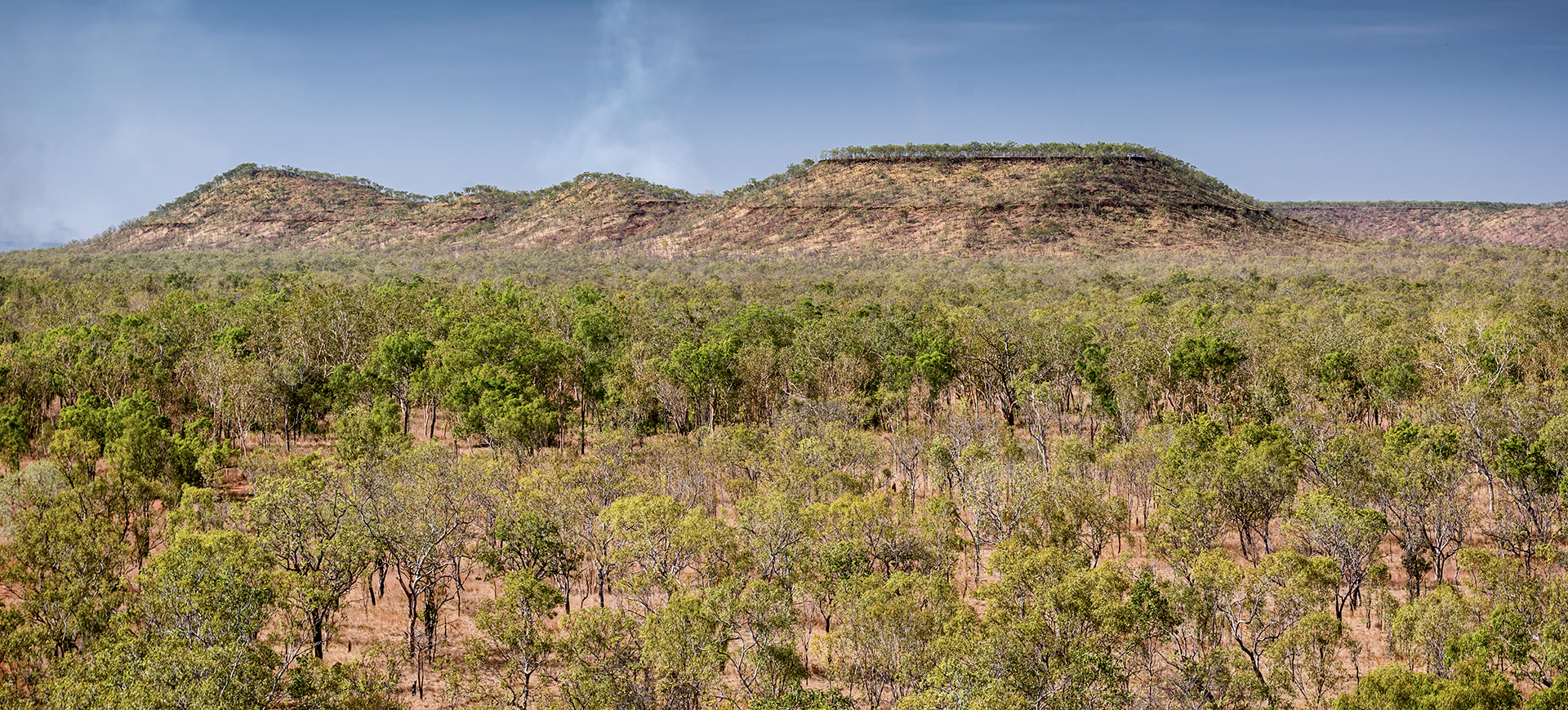
Tabletop country of the Katherine Flora Basin.

== See also ==
- List of regions in Australia
