= Sandra Nelson (politician) =

Australian politician

Member of the Northern Territory Legislative Assembly for Katherine
- In office 27 August 2016 – 30 July 2020
- Preceded by: Willem Westra van Holthe
- Succeeded by: Jo Hersey

Personal details
- Born: 21 January 1971 (age 55) Portuguese Timor
- Party: Labor Party
- Children: 1
- Occupation: Legal and health sector worker

Sandra João Nelson (born 21 January 1971) is an Australian politician. She successfully contested the Northern Territory Legislative Assembly seat of Katherine at the 2016 Northern Territory general election for the Labor Party. She is the first Labor member to represent the Katherine area, defeating former Deputy Chief Minister Willem Westra van Holthe. She is also the first Timorese born person to be elected to any parliament in Australia.

== Early life and career ==
Nelson is the daughter of East Timorese politician João Viegas Carrascalão and the niece of José Ramos-Horta, formerly President of East Timor. Nelson and her family left Timor in 1975 at the height of the civil war, and were granted permanent residency in Australia in 1977. The family first settled in Sydney before Sandra moved to the Territory in 2012. Nelson has a 15-year-old son.

Nelson has served as an active duty soldier, worked in the transportation industry, before moving on to local government work in Western Australia, work with the United Nations in the Security Sector Reform Unit, and worked in the health and legal sector in Katherine prior to being elected.

Nelson's professional career has focused on community development. Nelson has previously worked as the Executive Officer of Katherine Women's Information & Legal Services and is a member of the Katherine YMCA board and the Justice Reinvestment Committee . She has worked with the Stronger Smarter Sisters Committee. Through her work in the community legal sector and health sector, Nelson has also served on community advisory panels that focused on domestic and family violence. Nelson is passionate about social justice, community development and empowerment, and the environment.

== 2016 election ==
Northern Territory Legislative Assembly
Years	Term	Electoral division	Party
2016–2020	13th	Katherine	Labor

Katherine's predecessor seat, Elsey, was a comfortably safe CLP seat for its entire existence, and the CLP kept this tradition going after Elsey was significantly reduced in size and renamed Katherine in 1987. Labor had only come reasonably close to winning it twice. Going into the election, it was the safest seat in the entire Territory; Nelson needed a 22.3 percent swing to win it.

However, Nelson led Westra van Holthe by a margin of less than one percent on election night amid the massive Labor wave that swept through the Territory. According to ABC projections, Westra van Holthe's primary vote almost halved, to only 35.2 percent—just four percent ahead of Nelson. Preferences allowed Nelson to narrowly pull ahead, and she continued to lead Westra van Holthe on a knife-edge as counting continued. It was eventually announced on 9 September that Nelson won by 28 votes on a swing of 22.6 percent—just barely what she needed to win.

In March 2019, Nelson announced she would not contest the 2020 election.

Nelson did not recontest in the 2020 NT general elections and is now living in Western Australia with her son. She remains actively involved within the ALP, recently volunteering as campaign director for Katrina Stratton who went on to win in the 2021 Western Australian state election, becoming the first Labor member for Nedlands. Stratton overcame a margin not much different from Nelson's margin in 2016 in Katherine.

Northern Territory Legislative Assembly
Preceded by Willem Westra van Holthe	Member for Katherine; 2016–2020	Succeeded by Jo Hersey
