= Regina Pilawuk Wilson =

Australian Aboriginal artist

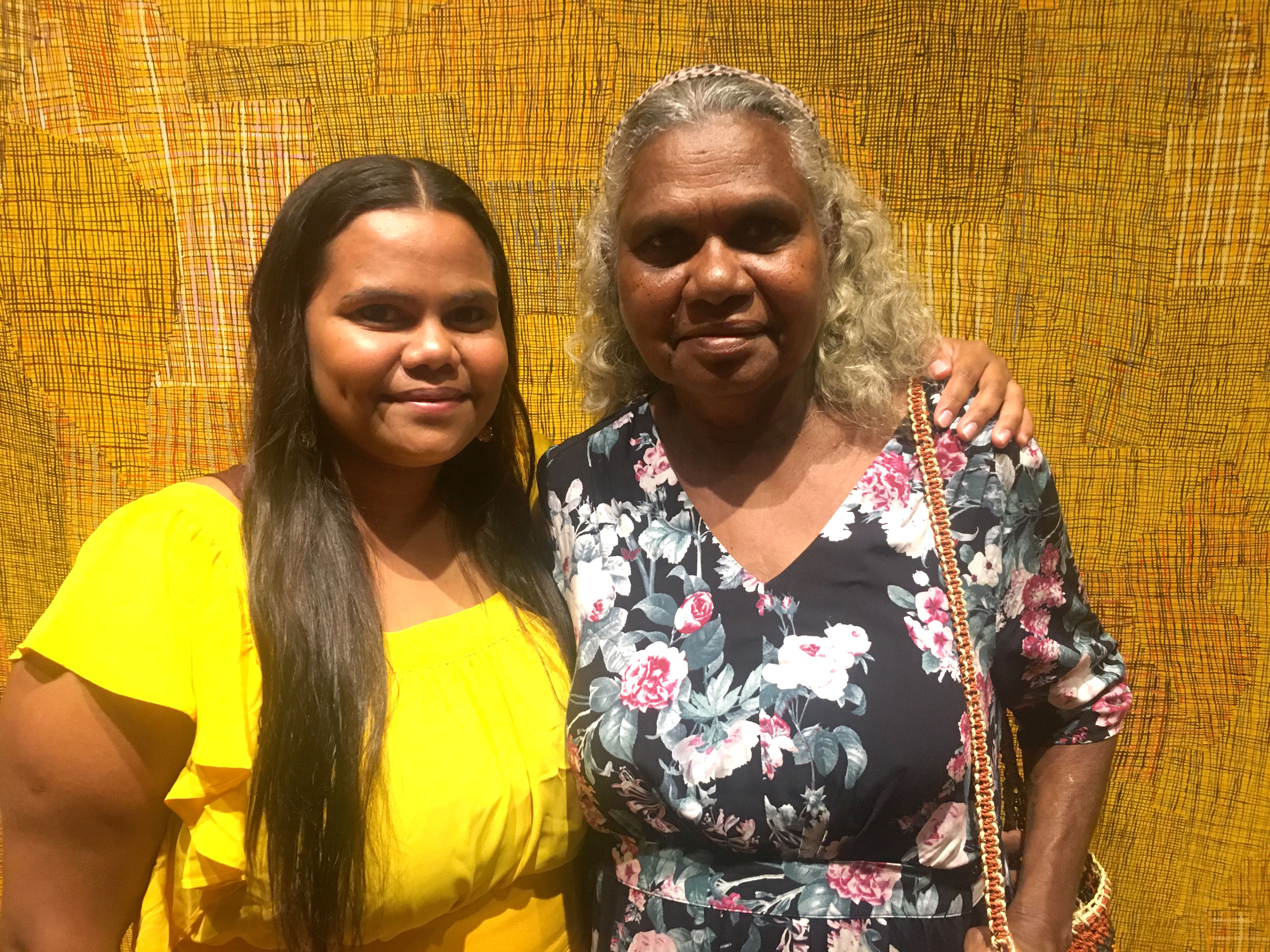
- Regina Pilawuk Wilson with her granddaughter Leaya Wilson at the opening of "Marking the Infinite: Contemporary Women Artists from Aboriginal Australia" at The Phillips Collection, Washington, D.C.
- Born: 1948 (age 77–78); Wudikapildyerr
- Spouse: Harold Wilson
- Children: Annunciata Nunuk Wilson (daughter), Harold Wilson Jr. (son), Anastasia Naiya Wilson (daughter), John Wilson (son), Henry Wilson (son), Anne-Carmel Nimbali Wilson (daughter)

Regina Pilawuk Wilson is an Australian Aboriginal artist known for her paintings, printmaking and woven fibre-artworks. She paints syaws (fish nets), warrgarri (dilly bag), and message sticks. Her work has been shown in many Australian and international museums, collections and galleries. She has won the General Painting category of the Telstra National Aboriginal & Torres Strait Islander Art Awards in 2003 for a syaw (fish net) painting. Wilson has been a finalist for the Kate Challis RAKA Award, the Togart Award, and the Wynne Prize.

== Biography ==
Regina Pilawuk Wilson was born in 1948 at Wudikapildyerr in the Daly River region of the Northern Territory of Australia. She is a master weaver and took up acrylic painting in 2001. Her subject matter is based around weaving fibre art. At age ten, her grandmother taught her where, when, and how to collect the right grasses, vines, and sources of natural colour like flowers, berries, and roots. She learned many weaving techniques. She perfected them over the decades and became an authority figure for her sense of familial and cultural identity.

Regina has also explored durrmu (body painting dot). She has created silk screen prints and etchings with Basil Hall Editions and Red Hand. At Peppimenarti, she has played a major role in establishing the Durrmu Arts center in 2007. She lives at Peppimenarti with her three daughters, three sons, two sisters, and many grandchildren. Her sisters are artists Mabel Jimarin and Margaret Kundu.

== Peppimenarti ==
Along with her husband Harold Wilson, she founded the Peppimenarti Community in 1971. Harold Wilson was born in 1938 at Peppimenarti. His mother was a Nganiwuwumeri woman from the Moyle River area and his father was a European. He died in 1998. Peppimenarti means “large rock.” This permanent settlement made for the Ngangikurrungurr people is situated amid floodplains and wetlands at the center of the Daly River Aboriginal Reserve, which lies 250 kilometers southwest of Darwin. This location is a crucial dreaming site for the Ngangikurrungurr language group. In the tropical wetland and floodplain country, the community has restricted access during the wet season, which has actually been an advantage in keeping the law and culture strong. There are about 150 to 200 people living there. Many of them move around in the dry season, go to outstations, move on to another community, or come back when it rains.

At Durrmu Arts, most of the prints are done from dilly bags and basket weavings. They teach children the language, the culture, and how to do weaving. It's important for Wilson to teach them so weaving remains strong. In 2011, the Peppimenarti Association formed the Durrmu Arts Aboriginal Corporation to represent an internationally renowned group of weavers and painters who work with durrmu designs. It is recognised as a peaceful town. There is little tolerance for alcohol consumption, formal education is highly valued. Wilson and the other women at Durrmu Arts reinvigorated the tradition of large, circular mats by combining brilliant colours. She later began to paint to transfer weaving designs to a larger, two-dimensional medium. Durrmu Arts is managed by a small group of women. On a typical day, artists gather in the communal outdoor studio in the morning, preferring to paint and weave before the humidity and heat arrive.

== Career ==
Her syaws, mats, and warrgadi are critical to her creative process. The transition of a crafted, functional object onto canvas, print-media, and textiles is her trademark. This link is showcased on major exhibitions like Floating Life at The Gallery of Modern Art/Queensland Art Gallery and String Theory at Sydney's Museum of Contemporary Art. At Durrmu Arts, she supports emerging artists, but her style is singular in its painting style and inimitable. Her work coincidentally resembles the cross-hatching styles of Aboriginal bark painters. This coincidental connection serves as a reminder of the interconnectedness of the Aboriginal community. In fact, Wilson says that her people used to communicate vast distances with message sticks. These message sticks and fine skeins of dotting and lines found in durrmu (body paint) have also inspired her recent paintings. Her work shows abstraction. It was shown in curator Felicity Fenner's Talking About Abstraction in Sydney in 2004. This exhibition paid tribute to Aboriginal painters who had invigorated painting for a generation of urban artists. Wilson claims that subtle reinventions are essentials to her work. She notes: “That style, I like it to always be with the old design. I like to keep the traditional story in there, but I change it a little, to keep it beautiful with different colour and pattern. Otherwise, it’s always the same design, and we all get tired of it. It needs to be interesting, so I am interested, and the people who look at it are interested and they want to learn about my culture.”

Attending the Contemporary Art Biennale (Pacific Arts Festival) in 2000, Wilson tried acrylic painting. In 2001, Wilson experimented with multiple designs and techniques in art workshops held by Darwin gallerist Karen Brown. At this time, she began transferring her weaving designs and patterns of syaw (fish nets), dilly string bags, wall mats, sun mats, and wupun (basket) onto canvas. Celebrating the cultural significance of message sticks, which are a traditional form of communication between communities, she also incorporates them into her paintings to show their densely textured qualities on canvas.

At a discussion at the Kluge-Ruhe Aboriginal Art Collection, Wilson explained her inspiration behind weaving. Her people, the Ngangikurrungurr, had passed on fishnet stitches from generation to generation with each community having its own special stitch. However, as the whites colonized the Daly River region, the Aboriginals were forced onto reserves and missions with strict rules aimed at dissolving the indigenous cultures and traditions. Many of the fishnet stitches were lost. She and her husband left the mission to start Peppimenarti to preserve their way of life. Determined to revive the ancestral fishnet stitches, she sought someone who could teach her the stitch that her grandfather had created. After finding an old woman who remembered the stitch, Wilson painted the stitch onto canvas to ensure it would never be lost again. Her paintings are her culture. Her work is contemporary art that challenges expectations. A key message that Wilson portrays in her work is to remember the past to understand the present and hope for the future.

Syaw replicates the elaborate and delicate patterning of woven objects like mates, baskets, and fish traps. Shifting colours and repeated patterns evoke the action of a weaver's hands. Drawing from her grandmother's work, she paints a wide variety of stitching and weaving designs. The weaving method used in Syaw is the same as the stitch used in weaving the warrgarri (dilly bag), except bigger. The pinbin vine or bush vine that grows near the river is stripped into fibres which are woven into a net. The Syaw catches fish, prawns, and edible creatures in rivers. Her dense, overlapping lines might look abstract, but Wilson always bases them on a particular object. The woven forms take on a cosmic dimension with thousands of rippling lines radiating from a central core or spreading across a surface. Recently, her work has been shown at the Phillips Collection in Washington, D.C.

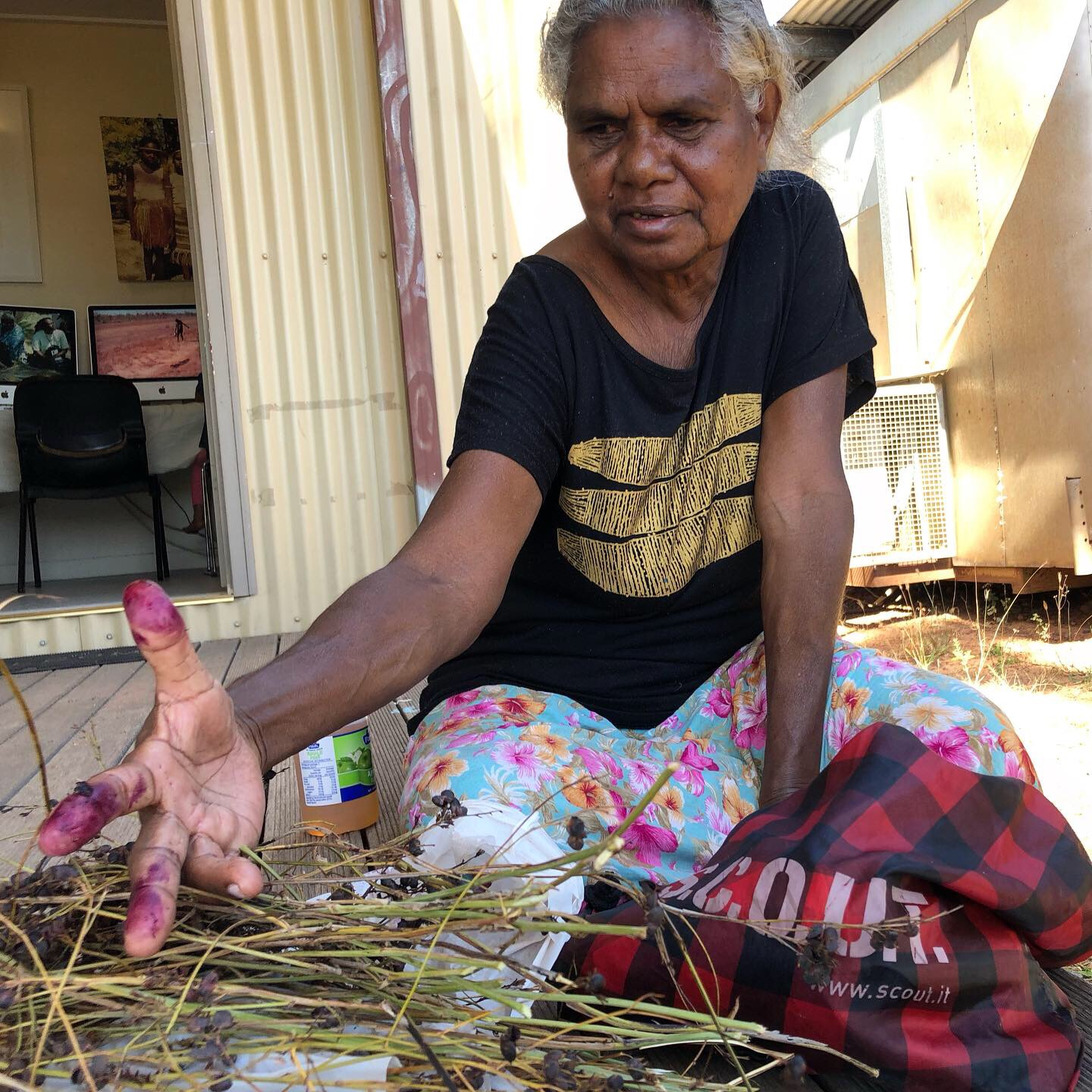
Regina Pilawuk Wilson demonstrating the natural materials used for dying fibre-works

== Significant exhibitions ==
- 2006: Dreaming Their Way: Australian Aboriginal Women Painters. National Museum of Women in the Arts, Washington DC and The Hood Museum of Art at Dartmouth College, Hanover, NH.
- 2016: Everywhen: The Eternal Present in Indigenous Art from Australia, Harvard Art Museums, Cambridge, MA.
- 2016-2019: Marking the Infinite: Contemporary Women Artists from Aboriginal Australia. Newcomb Art Museum, Tulane University, New Orleans, LA; Frost Art Museum, Florida International University, Miami, FL; Nevada Museum of Art, Reno, NV; The Phillips Collection, Washington, DC; Museum of Anthropology, University of British Columbia, Vancouver, BC, Canada.
- Her work has been included in group exhibitions at many public and private institutions including the Wynne Prize, Art Gallery of New South Wales (2008) and 'Dreaming their Way: Australian Aboriginal Women Painters’ at the National Museum of Women in the Arts, Washington DC (2006).

== Collections ==
- Art Gallery of New South Wales
- Australian Parliament House
- The British Museum
- National Gallery of Australia
- National Gallery of Victoria
- Queensland Art Gallery
- The Phillips Collection
