= NTFL =

NTFL may mean:

- Northern Territories Federation of Labour in Canada
- Northern Territory Football League in Australia
- Northern Tasmanian Football League in Australia
- New Tube for London (NTfL), a planned programme to introduce automatic trains on several London Underground deep-tube lines.
