= 2003 Katherine by-election =

4 October 2003
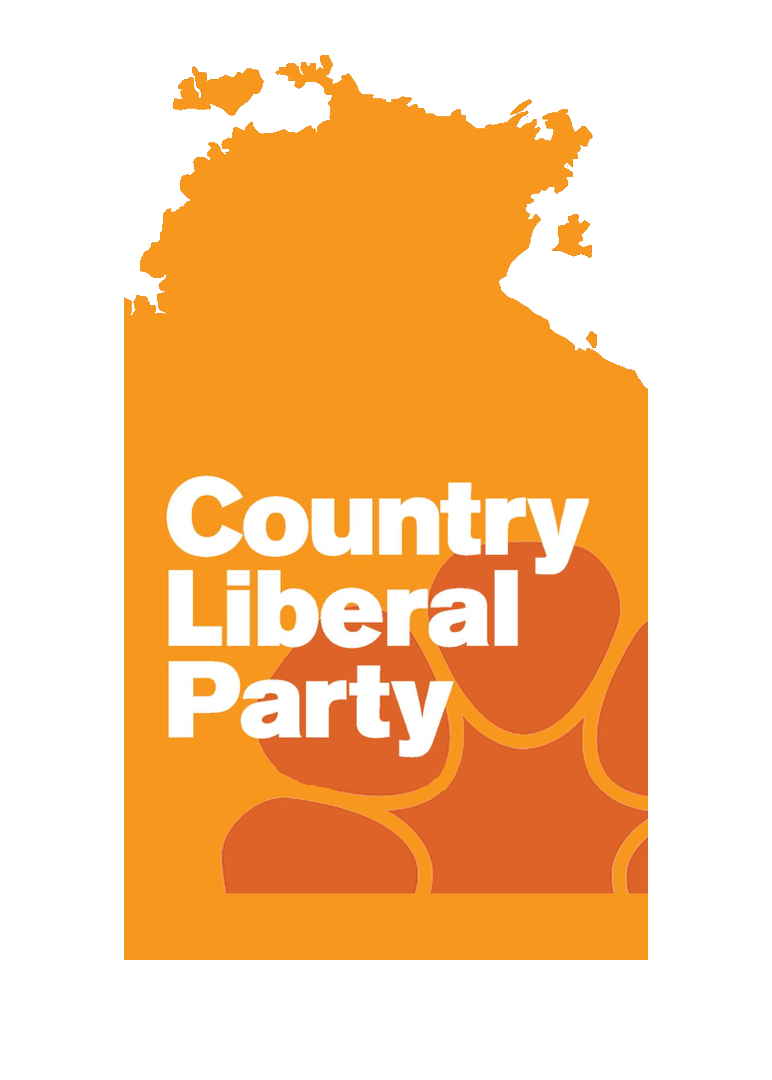

	First party	Second party	Third party
			IND
Candidate	Fay Miller	Sharon Hillen	Jim Forscutt
Party	Country Liberal	Labor	Independent
Popular vote	1,231	955	524
Percentage	41.9%	32.5%	17.8%
Swing	▼10.3	▲6.5	▲17.8
TPP	54.3%	45.7
TPP swing	▼10.2	▲10.2
MP before election
Mike Reed
Country Liberal
Elected MP
Fay Miller
Country Liberal

A by-election for the seat of Katherine in the Northern Territory Legislative Assembly was held on 4 October 2003. The by-election was triggered by the resignation of Country Liberal Party (CLP) member Mike Reed, a former Deputy Chief Minister. The seat had been held by Reed since its creation in 1987.

The CLP selected Fay Miller, the owner of Red Gum Tourist Park, as its candidate. The Labor candidate was Sharon Hillen, while three independent candidates contested, including the mayor of Katherine, Jim Forscutt.

== Results ==
Katherine by-election, 2003
Party	Candidate	Votes	%	±%
Country Liberal	Fay Miller	1,231	41.9	−10.3
Labor	Sharon Hillen	955	32.5	+6.5
Independent	Jim Forscutt	524	17.8	+17.8
Independent	Markus Bader	120	4.1	+4.1
Independent	Peter Byers	111	3.8	+3.8
Total formal votes		2,941	95.7	−1.1
Informal votes		133	4.3	+1.1
Turnout		3,074	75.8	−7.0
Two-party-preferred result
Country Liberal	Fay Miller	1,596	54.3	−10.2
Labor	Sharon Hillen	1,345	45.7	+10.2
Country Liberal hold		Swing	–10.2	
