= Cossack, Northern Territory =

Cossack Katherine, Northern Territory
- Coordinates: 14°26′47.4″S 132°10′35.0″E
- Population: 1,293 (2021 census)
- Postcode(s): 0850
- Time zone: ACST (UTC+9:30)
- Location: 13.8 km (9 mi) from Katherine
- LGA(s): Katherine Town Council
- Territory electorate(s): Katherine
- Federal division(s): Lingiari

Cossack is a suburb of the town of Katherine, Northern Territory, Australia. It is within the Katherine Town Council local government area. The area was officially defined as a suburb in April 2007, adopting the name from white émigré farmers who settled in the area.

The locality consists mostly of rural land holdings mixed with some smaller farms and residences, however there is also a small industrial area and power station close to the Stuart Highway.

== Demographics ==
As of the 2021 Australian census, 1,293 people resided in Cossack, up from 1,223 in the 2016 census. The median age of persons in Cossack was 39 years. There were more males than females, with 51.1% of the population male and 48.9% female. The average household size was 2.8 people per household.
