= Binjari =

Binjari Community Government Council
- Local government area
- Coordinates: 14°33′01″S 132°10′53″E
- Country: Australia
- State: Northern Territory
- Region: Katherine, Northern Territory

Area
  - Total: 2.82 km^{2} (1.09 sq mi)

Population
  - Total: 274 (2006)
  - Density: 97.2/km^{2} (251.7/sq mi)

The Binjari Community Government Council was a local government area in the Northern Territory of Australia. It is located 15 minutes from Katherine, Northern Territory.

== Suburbs ==
- Binjari

== Meetings ==
2nd Thursday of every month.

== See also ==
- Local Government Areas of the Northern Territory
