= Lansdowne, Northern Territory =

Lansdowne Katherine, Northern Territory
- Coordinates: 14°25′2.6″S 132°23′3.1″E
- Population: 510 (2016 census)
- Postcode(s): 0850
- Time zone: ACST (UTC+9:30)
- Location: 5.2 km (3 mi) from Katherine
- LGA(s): Katherine Town Council
- Territory electorate(s): Katherine
- Federal division(s): Lingiari

Lansdowne is a suburb of the town of Katherine, Northern Territory, Australia. It is within the Katherine Town Council local government area. The area was officially defined as a suburb in April 2007, adopting the name from Anne Pascoe Lansdowne (1909 - 1973) and her husband Frank (1907 - 1989), both in whom co-owned Kumbidgee Station brahman stud.
