= Thamarrurr, Northern Territory =

Thamarrurr Northern Territory
- Coordinates: 14°08′38″S 129°38′14″E
- Population: 197 (2016 census)
- Established: 4 April 2007
- Postcode(s): 0822
- Time zone: ACST (UTC+9:30)
- Location: 389.5 km (242 mi) SW of Darwin City
- LGA(s): West Daly Region
- Territory electorate(s): Daly
- Federal division(s): Lingiari
Mean max temp	Mean min temp	Annual rainfall
33.6 °C; 92 °F	25.5 °C; 78 °F	1,317.8 mm 51.9 in

Thamarrurr is a locality in the Northern Territory of Australia located 389.5 kilometres (242.0 mi) south-west of the territorial capital of Darwin.

Thamarrurr is named after the Thamarrurr Community Government Council which the locality covers. The locality's boundaries and name were gazetted on 4 April 2007.

The 2016 Australian census which was conducted in August 2016 reports that Thamarrurr had 197 people living within its boundaries.

Thamarrurr is located within the federal division of Lingiari, the territory electoral division of Daly and the local government area of the West Daly Region.
