= Jo Hersey =

Australian politician (born 1967)

Jo Hersey MLA

Member of the Northern Territory Legislative Assembly for Katherine
- Incumbent
- Assumed office 22 August 2020
- Preceded by: Sandra Nelson

Personal details
- Born: 9 March 1967 (age 59) North Adelaide, South Australia
- Party: Country Liberal Party
- Occupation: Hairdresser

Jo Hersey (born 9 March 1967) is an Australian politician. She is a member for electoral division of Katherine in the Northern Territory Legislative Assembly.

Northern Territory Legislative Assembly
Years	Term	Electoral division	Party
2020–present	14th	Katherine	Country Liberal

Hersey was born in Adelaide, but moved to the Northern Territory when she was young. The family returned to Adelaide after a few years, but Hersey returned to Katherine after she married. Before being elected, she was a hairdresser, continuing a family tradition that stretched back 3 generations.

In the 2020 Northern Territory general election Hersey won a close race in the seat of Katherine to be elected to Legislative Assembly for the Country Liberal Party.
