= Daly River, Northern Territory =

Town in the Northern Territory, Australia

Daly River
- Suburb
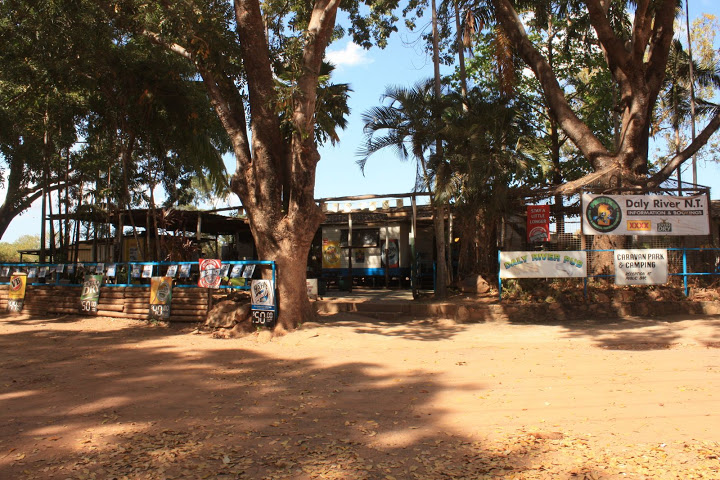
- Daly River Roadside Inn

- Coordinates: 13°35′11″S 130°38′28″E
- Country: Australia
- State: Northern Territory
- LGAs: Victoria Daly Region; unincorporated area
- Location: 222 km (138 mi) from Darwin; 311 km (193 mi) from Katherine
- Established: 1865; 4 April 2007 (locality)

Government
  - Territory electorate: Daly
  - Federal division: Lingiari

Population
  - Total: 127 (2016 census)
- Time zone: UTC+9:30 (ACST)
- Postcode: 0822
Suburbs around Daly River
Rakula	Rakula	Litchfield Park
Nemarluk	Daly River	Litchfield Park; Tipperary; Nauiyu; Maranunga; Nauiyu; Tipperary
Nemarluk	Nemarluk; Tipperary	Tipperary

Daly River is a town adjacent to the Daly River in the Northern Territory of Australia. At the 2006 census, Daly River had a population of 468. The town is part of the Victoria Daly Region local government area. The area is popular for recreational fishing, being regarded as one of the best places to catch barramundi in Australia.

== History ==
=== Early settlement and mission ===
The traditional owners of the area are the Mulluk-Mulluk people who live both in Nauiyu and at Wooliana downstream from the community.

European settlement of Daly River began in 1865 with the arrival of Boyle Travers Finniss, the first Premier of South Australia and the first Government Resident of the Northern Territory. Finniss named the river after Sir Dominick Daly, the Governor of South Australia, since the Northern Territory was at that time part of South Australia. The region lay untouched by Europeans until 1882 when copper was discovered.

Daly River town was the scene of some particularly bloody exchanges between the local Aborigines and the miners. In 1884 three miners were killed. The miners in the town wreaked vengeance on the local Aborigines out of proportion to the perceived crime. A year later, probably aware of the tensions in the area, the Society of Jesus order of the Roman Catholic Church established a mission in the town, introducing Christianity and farming techniques to the local Aboriginal population. The original mission endured until 1899, when following a significant flood the missionaries were withdrawn.

In 1954, contact between traditional Malak Malak elders and the then bishop of Darwin led to the mission being reestablished. In 1955, the church purchased 4,000 acres (1,600 ha) of land and the Missionaries of the Sacred Heart helped to establish a school and a clinic for the community. The mission was later renamed Nauiyu and with the exception of the church, convent, school and associated residences transferred to community ownership. Due to the influence of the mission in the town, 75% percent of the population identify as Roman Catholics.

Through the twentieth century there were a number of attempts to settle the town without real success. In 1911 the Commonwealth Government tried to convince people to move to the town. By the 1920s there were plans for crops of peanuts and tobacco which came to nothing. Cashews and sugar cane were also planted unsuccessfully. In 1967 the Tipperary Land Corporation cleared large tracts of land around the settlement and started growing sorghum but the operation was closed down in 1973.

=== Floods ===
Like other rivers of the Top End, the Daly is prone to seasonal flooding and this has had a significant impact on the small community throughout its history. Major flood events devastated the town in 1899 and 1957, causing widespread property damage. On 28 January 1998, a major natural disaster saw every building in the town inundated and the entire population airlifted to Batchelor during the emergency evacuation. The floodwaters, fed by heavy rainfall in the wake of Tropical Cyclone Les continued to rise until 3 February, reaching a peak of 16.8 m (55 ft), the highest level recorded to date.

== Economy and infrastructure ==
Daly River is considered a remote community, and is primarily accessed via the Daly River Road which was sealed as far as the river crossing in 2007, providing all weather access to Darwin. A sealed airstrip at Nauiyu provides for charter and medical evacuation flights, however there are no scheduled air services to the airport, or aircraft regularly based in the town.

Other public facilities at Daly River include a public library, swimming pool, school and health clinic. There is a Catholic church, St Francis Xavier located in Nauiyu. The Victoria Daly Regional Council maintains a regional office in the community, contributing more than 40 jobs to the local economy. Public Administration is by far the largest employment industry, accounting for over half of the workforce.

The town and surrounding district are served by a modern police station, built in 1994. Two members of the Northern Territory Police are based here. The area serviced by the station is 33,000 km^{2} (13,000 sq mi), and the responsibilities of the Daly River members include Emergency Management and boat access to the communities when the roads are cut by seasonal flooding.

== Attractions ==
Today the town has a pub with motel units, a police station, and a number of caravan parks. It is located on the banks of the river a couple of kilometres from the Daly River Crossing, now by sealed road from the main tourist route, the Stuart Highway. The settlement is a centre for visitors to explore the Daly River Nature Park and fishermen after barramundi. The park is home to saltwater crocodiles, reptiles, spiders, cockatoos, wild pigs, feral Water Buffalo, mangroves, giant bamboos, pandanus and the red kapok tree, Bombax ceiba.

On the road 5 kilometres (3 mi) east of Daly River is a turnoff to Woolianna, where there are numerous caravan parks. Just before entering the town there is a turnoff to the Nauiyu Aboriginal Community, home to the Roman Catholic Mission and Merrepen Arts Centre where local art is sold. Merrepen Arts has become a well known art centre in the top end. In recent years a number of artists from the area have become nationally famous including Marita Sambono and Kieren Karritpul. The art centre and workshops are open to the public on weekdays.

== Climate ==
Climate data for Daly River (Mango Farm), elevation 15 m (49 ft), (1991–2015 normals, extremes 1980–2015)
Month	Jan	Feb	Mar	Apr	May	Jun	Jul	Aug	Sep	Oct	Nov	Dec	Year
Record high °C (°F)	39.4 (102.9)	37.9 (100.2)	38.9 (102.0)	38.1 (100.6)	37.2 (99.0)	36.5 (97.7)	37.0 (98.6)	39.2 (102.6)	40.6 (105.1)	41.5 (106.7)	41.5 (106.7)	40.5 (104.9)	41.5 (106.7)
Mean daily maximum °C (°F)	33.5 (92.3)	33.2 (91.8)	34.1 (93.4)	34.3 (93.7)	33.0 (91.4)	31.3 (88.3)	31.7 (89.1)	33.4 (92.1)	36.6 (97.9)	37.6 (99.7)	36.5 (97.7)	34.8 (94.6)	34.2 (93.5)
Mean daily minimum °C (°F)	23.8 (74.8)	23.8 (74.8)	23.6 (74.5)	21.7 (71.1)	18.4 (65.1)	15.5 (59.9)	14.8 (58.6)	15.3 (59.5)	19.1 (66.4)	22.1 (71.8)	23.3 (73.9)	23.8 (74.8)	20.4 (68.8)
Record low °C (°F)	19.5 (67.1)	19.1 (66.4)	14.5 (58.1)	10.0 (50.0)	7.6 (45.7)	5.1 (41.2)	3.3 (37.9)	4.6 (40.3)	9.1 (48.4)	10.5 (50.9)	17.1 (62.8)	20.4 (68.7)	3.3 (37.9)
Average rainfall mm (inches)	391.1 (15.40)	351.5 (13.84)	208.5 (8.21)	71.6 (2.82)	4.8 (0.19)	0.2 (0.01)	0.1 (0.00)	0.7 (0.03)	6.5 (0.26)	44.5 (1.75)	140.6 (5.54)	283.0 (11.14)	1,503.1 (59.19)
Average rainy days (≥ 1.0 mm)	18.6	16.7	12.8	4.4	0.9	0.0	0.0	0.2	0.8	4.5	10.8	16.3	86
Source: Australian Bureau of Meteorology

== See also ==
- Daly Waters, Northern Territory
- Daly languages
