= Tindal, Northern Territory =

Tindal Katherine, Northern Territory
- Coordinates: 14°31′33.2″S 132°23′0.6″E
- Population: 857 (2016 census)
- Postcode(s): 0853
- Time zone: ACST (UTC+9:30)
- Location: 18.5 km (11 mi) from Katherine
- LGA(s): Katherine Town Council
- Territory electorate(s): Arnhem
- Federal division(s): Lingiari

Tindal is a suburb of the town of Katherine, Northern Territory, Australia. It is within the Katherine Town Council local government area. The area was officially defined as a suburb in April 2007, adopting the name from RAAF Base Tindal.

Ahead of the 2020 Territory election, the Northern Territory Electoral Commission moved boundaries, placing Tindal within the Arnhem electorate. As a result of this change, the suburb is represented by a different Member of the MLA to residents in the town of Katherine itself.
