= Burrundie, Northern Territory =

Burrundie Victoria Daly Region, Northern Territory
- Coordinates: 13.4921°S 131.861°E
- Population: 35 (2016 census)
- Postcode(s): 0822
- Time zone: ACST (UTC+9:30)
- Location: 30 km (19 mi) N of Pine Creek; 110 km (68 mi) NW of Katherine
- LGA(s): Victoria Daly Region
- Territory electorate(s): Daly
- Federal division(s): Lingiari

Burrundie is a locality in the Northern Territory, Australia. It is located within the Victoria Daly Region, approximately 30 km (19 mi) north of Pine Creek. A mining settlement of the same name was established in the area during the late 1880s, but the town was abandoned after 1900. The present day locality consists mostly of rural land holdings and was officially defined in April 2007 for administrative purposes. "Burrundie" is believed to be derived from the local aboriginal name for the area surrounding Mount Wells, a prominent feature in the locality.

== History ==
The Woolwonga aboriginal tribe claim Burrundie as part of their traditional lands. Recognition of this claim was complicated by a frontier conflict in 1884. As reprisal for reportedly spearing and killing four European settlers, the Woolwonga were believed to have been exterminated in a series of massacres, often associated with the town of Burrundie, which was the regional centre for the goldfields at the time. Documents uncovered in the 2010s however indicate that the daughter of a Woolwonga woman and a white settler had survived and was registered in the 1899 census, leading her descendants to assert native title over Burrundie.

=== Mining town ===
Following the discovery of gold at nearby Yam Creek in 1872, a town site was surveyed by South Australian government in 1884 along a corridor reserved for the Palmerston and Pine Creek Railway. It became the second town in the Northern Territory when gazetted on 30 October, with the first of 316 allotments made available by public auction in December of that year. By 1887, a police station and mining warden's office had been relocated to Burrundie from an isolated location in the goldfields, while residents petitioned for the nearest telegraph station to also be relocated to improve the efficiency of services in the town.

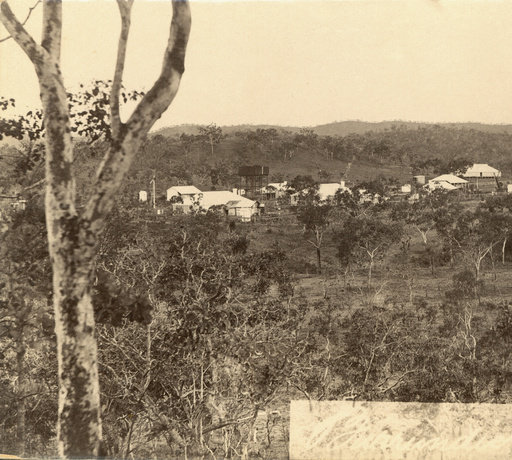
A view of Burrundie township c.1890

At its peak during the 1890s the town boasted a railway station, court house and a hospital. It was a key location during construction of the railway to Pine Creek with an underground explosives magazine built in 1885. An above ground magazine added in 1896 remained in use until World War II, well after the town's decline. The magazines were added to the Northern Territory Heritage Register in 1995.

Burrundie's significance waned in the early 20th the century, evidenced by the closure of the police station in 1906 (was briefly reopened before again closing in 1908), abolition of the local court in 1908 and the relocation of the prefabricated Mining Warden's Office building to Pine Creek in 1913. Burials at Burrundie cemetery lasted from 1893 until 1901.

=== 21st century ===
In September 2014, Woolwonga descendents met at the former Burrundie railway siding for a ceremony to affirm their cultural identity and commemorate the 130th anniversary of a raid by white settlers and police that killed 30 aboriginal men and an unknown number of women and children. During the ceremony, a plaque was unveiled by Senator Nigel Scullion, Minister for Indigenous Affairs commemorating the massacre and describing the plight of the Woolwonga in the years that followed.

== Present day ==
Today, the boundaries of Burrundie have been redefined as an expanded rural locality taking in many of the surrounding former goldfields with a population of 35 people. Within the former township, there remain 25 freehold titles, although these are mainly historic records.

The 1896 railway powder magazine is the last building still standing, while some ruined foundations and the railway station platform are all that remain of the mining town. The standard-gauge Adelaide–Darwin railway follows the 19th century narrow-gauge alignment through Burrundie, passing close to the former station.
