= Victoria Daly Regional Council =

- Local government area
- Interactive map of Victoria Daly Regional Council
- Coordinates: 14.4670°S 132.2670°E
- Country: Australia
- State: Northern Territory
- Region: Katherine Region
- Established: 2008
- Council seat: Katherine East (outside LGA)

Government
  - Mayor: Brian Pedwell
  - Territory electorate: Stuart
  - Federal division: Lingiari

Area
  - Total: 153,287 km^{2} (59,184 sq mi)

Population
  - Total: 3,138 (2018)
  - Density: 0.020471/km^{2} (0.053021/sq mi)
- Website: Victoria Daly Regional Council
LGAs around Victoria Daly Regional Council
West Daly	Unincorporated Top End Region	Roper Gulf
Wyndham-East Kimberley	Victoria Daly Regional Council	Roper Gulf
Halls Creek	Central Desert	Barkly

The Victoria Daly Regional Council is a local government area in the Northern Territory of Australia. The shire covers an area of 153,287 square kilometres (59,184 sq mi) and had a population of 3,138 in June 2018.

== History ==
In October 2006 the Northern Territory Government announced the reform of local government areas. The intention of the reform was to improve and expand the delivery of services to towns and communities across the Northern Territory by establishing eleven new shires. The Victoria Daly Shire was created on 1 July 2008 as were the remaining ten shires. The first election for the Shire was held on 25 October 2008.

The Shire became the Victoria Daly Region on 1 January 2014.

Most of the land now part of the Region used to be unincorporated, but several existing LGAs were merged into it:

- Daguragu Community
- Nauiyu Nambiyu Community
- Timber Creek Community
- Walangeri Ngumpinku Community
- Pine Creek Community
- Woolianna Community

On 1 July 2014, the boundaries on its west side were revised to create a new local government area called the West Daly Region which consisted of the following three wards from the Victoria Daly Region - Nganmarriyanga, Thamarrurr/Pindi Pindi and Tyemirri.

A general election was held in September 2017. Councillor Brian Pedwell was elected Mayor of Victoria Daly Regional Council.

== Wards ==
The Victoria Daly Regional Council is divided into 5 wards, which is governed by 5 councillors:

- Pine Creek (1)
- Milngin (1)
- Timber Creek (1)
- Walangeri (1)
- Daguragu (1)

== Localities and communities ==
Land within the Victoria Daly Shire was divided in 2007 into bounded areas for the purpose of creating an address for a property. Most bounded areas are called "localities" while those associated with aboriginal communities are called "communities". (Note: Part of the locality of Lajamanu was located within the Victoria Daly Region until its boundaries were altered in 2014 resulting in reduction of its area and therefore no part of it being located within the region.)

=== Communities ===
Community	Population	Map
Daguragu	196 (SAL 2021)	
Kalkarindji	383 (SAL 2021)	
Nauiyu	350 (SAL 2021)	
Pigeon Hole	121 (SAL 2021)	
Yarralin (Walangeri)	283 (SAL 2021)	

=== Localities ===
- Baines
- Bradshaw
- Buchanan
- Burrundie
- Claravale
- Daly River
- Delamere
- Douglas-Daly (part)
- Edith
- Fleming
- Gregory
- Gurindji (part)
- Maranunga
- Nemarluk (part)
- Pine Creek
- Timber Creek
- Tipperary
- Top Springs
- Victoria River
