= Claravale, Northern Territory =

Suburb in the Northern Territory, Australia

Claravale
- Suburb
- Interactive map of Claravale
- Coordinates: 14°22′05″S 131°34′21″E
- Country: Australia
- State: Northern Territory
- LGA: Victoria Daly Region
- Location: 224.9 km (139.7 mi) S of Darwin
- Established: 4 April 2007

Government
  - Territory electorate: Stuart
  - Federal division: Lingiari

Area
  - Total: 2,696 km^{2} (1,041 sq mi)

Population
  - Total: 10 (2016 census)
  - Density: 0.0037/km^{2} (0.010/sq mi)
- Time zone: UTC+9:30 (ACST)
- Postcode: 0822

Claravale is a locality in the Northern Territory of Australia about 224.9 kilometres (139.7 mi) south of the territory capital of Darwin.

The locality's boundaries and name were gazetted on 4 April 2007. Its name is derived from the pastoral station of the same name.

The 2016 Australian census which was conducted in August 2016 reports that Claravale had a population of 10 people.

Claravale is located within the federal division of Lingiari, the territory electoral division of Stuart and the local government area of the Victoria Daly Region.
