= Town of Katherine =

Coordinates: 14.4667°S 132.2762°E

Katherine Town Council
- Local government area
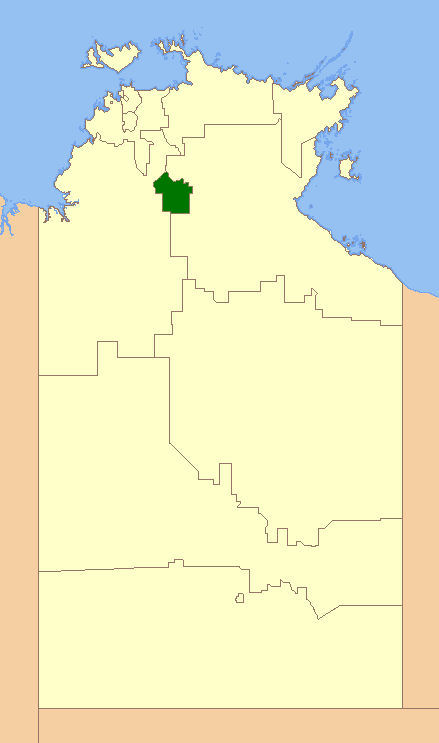
- Location of Katherine Town Council

- Interactive map of Katherine Town Council
- Country: Australia
- State: Northern Territory
- Region: Katherine
- Established: 1978
- Council seat: Katherine

Government
  - Mayor: Joanna Holden (since 2025)
  - Territory electorate: Katherine
  - Federal division: Lingiari

Area
  - Total: 7,417 km^{2} (2,864 sq mi)

Population
  - Total: 10,621 (2018)
  - Density: 1.43198/km^{2} (3.7088/sq mi)
- Website: Katherine Town Council
LGAs around Katherine Town Council
| Victoria Daly | Roper Gulf | Roper Gulf |
| Victoria Daly | Katherine Town Council | Roper Gulf |
| Victoria Daly | Victoria Daly | Roper Gulf |

The Katherine Town Council is a local government area in the Northern Territory, established on 3 March 1978. It is situated 320 kilometres (200 mi) south of Darwin, and covers an area of 7,417 square kilometres (2,864 sq mi).

The Town of Katherine is an established residential township with a commercial area and rural areas on the outskirts of the town. The original inhabitants of the town were the Dagoman and Jawoyn Aboriginal people. European settlement of the area dates from 1871, following the construction of the Overland Telegraph Line. Growth of the town began to start from 1926, following the opening of the railway line. The township grew around the railway line. The most significant development occurred in the post-war years, aided by growth in the tourism industry.

The current mayor is Joanna Holden, who presides over a council with six aldermen. Meetings are held on the 4th Tuesday of every month.

== Suburbs, localities and communities ==
Land within the Katherine municipality was divided in 2007 into bounded areas for the purpose of creating an address for a property. The bounded areas within the Katherine urban area are called "suburbs", those in adjoining rural areas are called "localities" and those associated with aboriginal communities are called "communities".

== Events ==
Katherine has one annual agricultural show every year known as the Katherine Show. The Katherine Show is run by a committee known as the KDSS (Katherine District Show Society). The 2027 theme was recently announced as “mango magic.”

To celebrate the town's centenary in 2026, the council organised historical exhibitions, community and cultural events including a free concert at the Katherine Showgrounds featuring Jem Cassar-Daley. Dylan Wright and Tom Curtain on Territory Day (July 1). The council held a community competition during 2025 to design a special centenary logo for the events, which was won by local artist Kim Maskell.
