= Electoral division of Katherine =

Coordinates: 14°28′0″S 132°16′0″E

Katherine Northern Territory—Legislative Assembly
- Interactive map of boundaries
- Territory: Northern Territory
- Created: 1987
- MP: Jo Hersey
- Party: Country Liberals
- Namesake: Katherine River
- Electors: 6,210 (2026)
- Area: 6,745 km^{2} (2,604.3 sq mi)
- Demographic: Urban
Electorates around Katherine:
| Daly | Arnhem | Arnhem |
| Daly | Katherine | Arnhem |
| Daly | Arnhem | Arnhem |

Katherine (/ˈkæθɹɪn/; Australian Kriol: Katherrain) is an electoral division of the Legislative Assembly in Australia's Northern Territory. The electorate was first created in 1987, replacing the abolished Elsey seat, and derives its name from the Katherine River. Katherine encompasses both urban and rural areas, covering an area of 6,745 km² and taking in the city of Katherine, as well as the Binjari Aboriginal Community.

== History ==
The city of Katherine has historically been a conservative bastion, making the seat of the same name a very safe Country Liberal Party seat for most of its first three decades. Its first member, Mike Reed, was Deputy Chief Minister of the Northern Territory from 1995 to 2001. Reed retired in 2003 and was succeeded at a by-election by Fay Miller, who survived a large swing to Labor to retain the seat for the CLP. Miller narrowly held onto her seat in Labor's landslide victory at the 2005 election, weathering another massive swing to Labor that surprised commentators on election night. In the end, however, Miller was left as one of only two CLP MLAs in the Top End. She retired at the 2008 election and was succeeded by Willem Westra van Holthe, who picked up a swing large enough to revert Katherine to its traditional status as a safe CLP seat. The 2012 election saw Westra van Holthe seemingly consolidate his grip on Katherine when he boosted his majority to 22.3 percent, making it the safest seat in the Territory.

At the 2016 election, Westra van Holthe suffered a swing just barely exceeding the one he had picked up in 2012, and narrowly lost the seat to Labor's Sandra Nelson after a shock victory in the seat. It was the first time that Labor had won a Katherine-based seat. Nelson retired at the 2020 election and the seat was won by the CLP's Jo Hersey.

== Members for Katherine ==
| Member | Party | Term |
|---|---|---|
| Mike Reed | Country Liberal | 1987–2003 |
| Fay Miller | Country Liberal | 2003–2008 |
| Willem Westra van Holthe | Country Liberal | 2008–2016 |
| Sandra Nelson | Labor | 2016–2020 |
| Jo Hersey | Country Liberal | 2020–present |

== Election results ==
2024 Northern Territory general election: Katherine
| Party | Candidate | Votes | % | ±% |
|---|---|---|---|---|
| Country Liberal | Jo Hersey | 2,181 | 56.9 | +24.4 |
| Independent | Sam Phelan | 1,071 | 28.0 | +28.0 |
| Labor | Nick Lovering | 578 | 15.1 | −17.9 |
| Total formal votes | | 3,830 | 96.6 | |
| Informal votes | | 136 | 3.4 | |
| Turnout | | 3,966 | 64.2 | |
Two-party-preferred result (Note: Estimated two-party-preferred count by Antony Green.)
| Country Liberal | Jo Hersey | 2,673 | 69.8 | +17.5 |
| Labor | Nick Lovering | 1,157 | 30.2 | −17.5 |
Two-candidate-preferred result
| Country Liberal | Jo Hersey | 2,381 | 62.2 | +9.6 |
| Independent | Sam Phelan | 1,449 | 37.8 | +37.8 |
| Country Liberal hold | | Swing | +9.6 | |
