= List of airports by ICAO code: YH-YQ =

List of airports by ICAO code: A - B - C - D - EB-EG - EH-EY - FA-FM - FN-FZ - G - H - ~~I~~ - J - KA-KH - KI-KP - KR-KZ - LA-LJ - LK-LZ - M - N - O - P - Q - R - SA-SC - SD-SH - SI - SJ - SK-SM - SN-SP - SQ - SS-SU - SV-SY - T - U - V - W - ~~X~~ - YA-YG - YH-YQ - YR-YZ - Z

Also see airport category and list.

== YH ==
ICAO	IATA	Airport name	Community	Coordinates	Notes
YHAA		Haasts Bluff Airstrip	Haasts Bluff, Northern Territory	23°27′02″S 131°51′05″E	
YHAB		Hideaway Bay Airstrip	Cape Gloucester, Queensland	20°06′14″S 148°26′45″E	
YHAC		Hayes Creek Airstrip	Douglas-Daly, Northern Territory	13°34′59″S 131°25′23″E	Closed
YHAE		Harden Airstrip	Cunningar, New South Wales	34°33′45″S 148°23′30″E	
YHAF		Harefield Airstrip	Harefield, New South Wales	34°57′23″S 147°32′25″E	
YHAG		Haig Airstrip	Rawlinna, Western Australia	31°00′23″S 126°04′40″E	
YHAL		Hall Airstrip	Wallaroo, New South Wales	35°08′39″S 149°02′35″E	
YHAR		Harrismith Aerodrome	Harrismith, Western Australia	32°56′29″S 117°51′53″E	
YHAW	HWK	Hawker Airport	Hawker, South Australia	31°51′17″S 138°28′06″E	
YHAY	HXX	Hay Airport	Hay, New South Wales	34°31′53″S 144°49′47″E	
YHAZ		Hazelton Airstrip	Toorbul, Queensland	27°02′48″S 153°03′05″E	
YHBA	HVB	Hervey Bay Airport	Hervey Bay, Queensland	25°19′14″S 152°52′54″E	
YHBD		Herbert Downs Airstrip	Amaroo, Queensland	23°02′16″S 139°14′13″E	
YHBH		Heidelberg West Heliport	Heidelberg West, Victoria	37°44′54″S 145°02′10″E	
YHBK		Holbrook Airport	Holbrook, New South Wales	35°40′48″S 147°19′21″E	
YHBP		Homebush Park Airport	Elsey, Northern Territory	14°39′45″S 132°38′43″E	
YHBR	HUB	Humbert River Airport	Humbert River, Northern Territory	16°29′23″S 130°37′49″E	
YHBY	HRY	Henbury Airport	Henbury Station, Northern Territory	24°35′02″S 133°14′10″E	
YHCS		Herbertvale Cattleyard Airstrip	Lawn Hill, Queensland	18°57′31″S 138°03′44″E	
YHCT		Heathcote Emergency Airstrip	Walcha, New South Wales	31°14′25″S 151°25′55″E	Closed
YHDD		Hodgson Downs Airstrip	Minyerri, Northern Territory	15°13′10″S 134°04′16″E	
YHDY	HIP	Headingly Airport	Headingly Station, Queensland	21°19′17″S 138°17′46″E	
YHEC		Heck Field Aerodrome	Norwell, Queensland	27°46′03″S 153°20′22″E	
YHED		Hedley Reef Seaplane Base	Coral Sea Islands	17°15′00″S 146°27′00″E	
YHEG		Hells Gate Airstrip	Nicholson, Queensland	17°27′20″S 138°20′56″E	
YHEH		Hexam Heliport	Hexham, New South Wales	32°49′35″S 151°41′09″E	
YHEL	HLV	Helenvale Airstrip	Rossville, Queensland	15°41′09″S 145°12′54″E	
YHER		Hervey Range Airstrip	Hervey Range, Queensland	19°22′54″S 146°27′50″E	
YHEW		Hedlow Airport	Mulara, Queensland	23°13′19″S 150°36′11″E	
YHEY		Heybridge Airstrip	Cuprona, Tasmania	41°06′05″S 145°59′02″E	Closed
YHFD		Hayfield Airstrip	Birdum, Northern Territory	16°44′14″S 133°30′18″E	
YHGI		Madge's Island Airfield	Hogan Island, Tasmania	39°13′28″S 146°59′11″E	
YHGN		Homesglen (Alan Afford) Airfield	Hopetoun, Victoria	35°41′42″S 142°15′34″E	
YHGR		Hugh River Airstrip	Hugh, Northern Territory	24°26′57″S 133°42′31″E	
YHGS		Hughes Siding Airstrip	Nullarbor, South Australia	30°43′00″S 129°30′29″E	
YHHL		Home Hill Airstrip	Osborne, Queensland	19°43′34″S 147°21′03″E	
YHHN		Hahndorf Heliport	Hahndorf, South Australia	35°03′18″S 138°47′54″E	
YHHY	HIG	Highbury Airport	Highbury, Queensland	16°25′27″S 143°08′43″E	
YHID	HID	Horn Island Airport	Horn Island, Queensland	10°35′08″S 142°17′34″E	
YHIL	HLL	Hillside Airport	Hillside, Western Australia	21°43′04″S 119°26′36″E	
YHIP		Port Hedland Heliport	Port Hedland, Western Australia	20°18′54″S 118°34′32″E	
YHIV		Hidden Valley Airstrip	Birdum, Northern Territory	16°32′51″S 132°54′27″E	
YHKI		Hicks Island Airstrip	Hicks Island, Queensland	11°58′56″S 143°16′05″E	
YHKT		Huckitta Airstrip	Hart, Northern Territory	22°56′27″S 135°26′53″E	
YHLB		Henley Brook Heliport	Henley Brook, Western Australia	31°48′23″S 116°00′38″E	Closed
YHLC	HCQ	Halls Creek Airport	Halls Creek, Western Australia	18°14′02″S 127°40′11″E	
YHLD		Hillside Airstrip	Cloncurry, Queensland	20°30′02″S 140°14′36″E	
YHLF		Highland Farm Airstrip	Paddys River, New South Wales	34°36′37″S 150°05′47″E	
YHLG		Hillgrove Airstrip	Basalt, Queensland	19°38′33″S 145°47′49″E	
YHLM		Hillman Farm Airstrip	Darkan, Western Australia	33°15′50″S 116°49′10″E	
YHLN		Helen Springs Aerodrome	Pamayu, Northern Territory	18°26′20″S 133°52′42″E	
YHLS		Hillston Airport	Hillston, New South Wales	33°29′37″S 145°31′25″E	
YHLW		Hollywell Seaplane Base	Hollywell, Queensland	27°54′00″S 153°25′00″E	
YHMB	HMG	Hermannsburg Airport	Hermannsburg, Northern Territory	23°55′40″S 132°48′45″E	
YHMD		Hamilton Downs Airstrip	Albion, Shire of Richmond, Queensland	21°24′24″S 142°23′58″E	
YHMH		Hillarys Marina Heliport	Hillarys, Western Australia	31°49′29″S 115°44′04″E	
YHML	HLT	Hamilton Airport	Hamilton, Victoria	37°38′54″S 142°03′54″E	
YHMT		Hamilton Airstrip	Eringa Station, South Australia	26°43′12″S 135°04′23″E	
YHMY		Hamersley Airstrip	Mount Sheila, Western Australia	22°16′49″S 117°40′14″E	
YHOA		Howard Island Airstrip	Howard Island, East Arnhem, Northern Territory	12°05′42″S 135°21′43″E	
YHOL		Holroyd Airstrip	Holroyd River, Queensland	14°09′31″S 142°40′52″E	
YHON		Honeymoon Airstrip	Kalkaroo, South Australia	31°45′12″S 140°39′54″E	
YHOO	HOK	Hooker Creek Airport	Lajamanu, Northern Territory	18°20′12″S 130°38′36″E	
YHOT	MHU	Mount Hotham Airport	Bright, Victoria	37°02′51″S 147°20′03″E	
YHOV		Hodgeson River Airstrip	Arnold, Northern Territory	15°32′45″S 134°05′44″E	
YHOW		Howey Reef Seaplane Base	Coral Sea Islands	17°25′42″S 146°24′43″E	
YHOX		Hoxton Park Airport	Hoxton Park, New South Wales	33°54′35″S 150°51′08″E	Closed
YHOY		Hollins Bay Airstrip	Stanage, Queensland	22°16′26″S 150°02′25″E	
YHPB		Happy Bay Seaplane Base	Long Island, Whitsunday Islands, Queensland	20°20′09″S 148°51′09″E	
YHPE		Hopetoun Aerodrome	Hopetoun, Western Australia	33°54′30″S 120°08′46″E	
YHPG		HMAS Penguin Heliport	Mosman, New South Wales	33°49′37″S 151°15′43″E	
YHPN	HTU	Hopetoun Airport	Hopetoun, Victoria	35°42′54″S 142°21′36″E	
YHPT		Hay Point Heliport	Hay Point, Queensland	21°17′09″S 149°16′39″E	
YHPV		Hope Vale Airstrip	Hope Vale, Queensland	15°17′32″S 145°06′13″E	
YHPY		Happy Valley Heliport	K'gari, Queensland	25°20′11″S 153°12′07″E	
YHRD		Hungerford Aerodrome	Hungerford, Queensland	28°59′46″S 144°27′11″E	
YHRG		Haddon Rig Aerodrome	Marthaguy, Warren Shire, New South Wales	31°27′57″S 147°53′44″E	
YHRN		Heron Island Heliport	Heron Island	23°26′30″S 151°54′41″E	
YHRT		Hartree Airstrip	Longreach, Queensland	22°53′19″S 143°28′16″E	
YHSB		Horseshoe Bend Airstrip	Ghan, Northern Territory	25°13′50″S 134°15′14″E	
YHSC		Harris Creek Airstrip	Numburindi, Northern Territory	13°46′01″S 135°48′17″E	
YHSJ		Holt Street Jetty Heliport	Pinkenba, Queensland	27°26′23″S 153°06′31″E	
YHSL		Horseshoe Lights Airstrip	Peak Hill, Western Australia	25°20′43″S 118°37′26″E	
YHSM	HSM	Horsham Airport	Horsham, Victoria	36°40′11″S 142°10′22″E	
YHSR		Hastings Reef Seaplane Base	Coral Sea Islands	16°30′59″S 146°01′00″E	
YHSV		Healesville Heliport	Healesville, Victoria	37°40′07″S 145°32′15″E	
YHTA		Hiltaba Aerodrome	Hiltaba Nature Reserve, South Australia	32°08′33″S 135°05′56″E	
YHTF		Huntfield Airfield	Seaford Meadows, South Australia	35°10′21″S 138°29′37″E	
YHTL	HAT	Heathlands Airport	Heathlands, Queensland	11°44′13″S 142°34′37″E	
YHTN		Herberton Airstrip	Kalunga, Queensland	17°25′47″S 145°23′48″E	
YHTR		Hunter Island Aerodrome	Hunter Island, Tasmania	40°31′22″S 144°44′29″E	
YHTS		Harts Range Airstrip	Hart, Northern Territory	22°59′06″S 134°55′05″E	
YHUG	HGD	Hughenden Airport	Hughenden, Queensland	20°48′45″S 144°13′28″E	
YHVF		Hutton Vale Farm Airstrip	Angaston, South Australia	34°31′00″S 139°06′18″E	
YHVH		Harvest Home Airstrip	Seventy Mile, Queensland	20°41′00″S 146°38′20″E	
YHYL		Hoyleton Airbase	Hoyleton, South Australia	34°01′45″S 138°31′27″E	
YHYN		Hayman Island Heliport	Hayman Island, Queensland	20°03′36″S 148°53′00″E	

== YI ==
ICAO	IATA	Airport name	Community	Coordinates	Notes
YIBM		Ironbark Mine Heliport	Burton, Queensland	21°44′08″S 148°09′51″E	
YIBO		Iron Bridge Mine Airport	Marble Bar, Western Australia	21°17′12″S 118°52′59″E	
YIDA		Mount Ida Airstrip	Ularring, Western Australia	29°12′40″S 120°27′12″E	
YIDK	IDK	Indulkana Airport	Indulkana, South Australia	26°57′56″S 133°19′19″E	
YIDR		Idracowra Aerodrome	Ghan, Northern Territory	25°03′46″S 133°44′17″E	
YIER		Pier 35 Seaplane Base	Melbourne, Victoria	37°49′24″S 144°54′25″E	
YIFF		Iffley Homestead Airstrip	Valkyrie, Queensland	22°14′12″S 148°25′59″E	
YIFL	IFL	Innisfail Airport	Mundoo, Queensland	17°33′31″S 146°00′42″E	
YIFY	IFF	Iffley Airport	Iffley Station, Queensland	18°52′31″S 141°12′57″E	
YIGM	IGH	Ingham Airport	Ingham, Queensland	18°39′38″S 146°09′06″E	
YIGR		Ingomar Aerodrome	Ingomar, South Australia	29°37′41″S 134°47′18″E	Military
YIKL		Baikal Airstrip	Anatye, Northern Territory	22°45′25″S 136°09′42″E	
YIKM	IKP	Inkerman Airport	Inkerman, Queensland	16°13′45″S 141°26′02″E	
YILA		Milawa Vineyard Airstrip	Milawa, Victoria	36°27′22″S 146°25′59″E	
YILF		Ilfracombe Airstrip	Ilfracombe, Queensland	23°28′18″S 144°32′03″E	
YILK		Ilkurlka Airstrip	Beadell, Western Australia	28°22′04″S 127°31′24″E	
YILW		Inglewood Aerodrome	Inglewood, Queensland	28°25′08″S 151°05′44″E	
YIMA		Imanpa Airstrip	Imanpa, Northern Territory	25°07′51″S 132°33′57″E	
YIMB		Kimba Airport	Kimba, South Australia	33°05′59″S 136°27′35″E	
YIMP		Impadna Airstrip	Ghan, Northern Territory	25°09′14″S 133°34′47″E	
YIMT		Innamincka Township Airstrip	Innamincka, South Australia	27°44′33″S 140°45′01″E	
YIMY		Imooya Airstrip	Dixie, Queensland	15°28′00″S 143°17′00″E	
YING		Ingelara Airstrip	Rewan, Queensland	24°59′49″S 148°20′00″E	
YINJ	INJ	Injune Airport	Injune, Queensland	25°51′00″S 148°33′00″E	
YINN	INM	Innamincka Airport	Innamincka, South Australia	27°41′50″S 140°44′23″E	
YINO		Inverell North Airstrip	Inverell, New South Wales	29°46′26″S 151°09′57″E	
YINT		Integra Coal Heliport	Glennies Creek, New South Wales	32°27′49″S 151°07′50″E	
YINV		Inverleigh Aerodrome	Normanton, Queensland	18°00′19″S 140°32′08″E	
YINW	IVW	Inverway Airport	Inverway Station, Northern Territory	17°50′28″S 129°38′35″E	
YISD		Isis Downs Aerodrome	Isisford, Queensland	24°12′59″S 144°37′35″E	
YISF	ISI	Isisford Airport	Isisford, Queensland	24°15′33″S 144°25′27″E	
YISV		Innesvale Airstrip	Bradshaw, Northern Territory	15°22′49″S 131°16′21″E	
YITT		Mitta Mitta Airport	Mitta Mitta, Victoria	36°30′42″S 147°21′24″E	
YIVA		Ivanhoe Station Airstrip	Lake Argyle, Western Australia	15°41′35″S 128°40′44″E	
YIVE		Inverloch Airfield	Inverloch, Victoria	38°36′46″S 145°44′01″E	
YIVG		Iveragh Airstrip	Iveragh, Queensland	24°03′56″S 151°23′41″E	
YIVL	IVR	Inverell Airport	Inverell, New South Wales	29°53′18″S 151°08′39″E	
YIVO		Ivanhoe Airport	Ivanhoe, New South Wales	32°53′05″S 144°18′42″E	

== YJ ==
ICAO	IATA	Airport name	Community	Coordinates	Notes
YJAB	JAB	Jabiru Airport	Jabiru, Northern Territory	12°39′30″S 132°53′36″E	
YJAC		Jacinth Ambrosia Airport	Jacinth Ambrosia, Ceduna, South Australia	30°54′06″S 132°11′00″E	
YJAK		Jackson Airstrip	Durham, Queensland	27°38′46″S 142°24′22″E	Closed
YJAM		Jameson Airstrip	Mantamaru Community, Western Australia	25°51′39″S 127°40′50″E	
YJBO		JD and Boo Field Aerodrome	Newry, Victoria	37°51′30″S 146°55′00″E	
YJBR		Jimbour Airstrip	Jimbour East, Queensland	26°57′36″S 151°14′10″E	
YJBY		Jervis Bay Airfield	Jervis Bay, New South Wales / Jervis Bay Territory	35°08′48″S 150°41′48″E	Military
YJCO		Jericho Airstrip	Jericho, Tasmania	42°22′06″S 147°20′10″E	
YJCW		Jacobs Well Aerodrome	Norwell, Queensland	27°46′04″S 153°20′22″E	
YJDA	JUN	Jundah Airport	Jundah, Queensland	24°49′53″S 143°03′56″E	
YJDL		Jindalee Airstrip	Bowning, New South Wales	34°49′37″S 148°47′29″E	
YJEB		Jenson Bay Seaplane Base	East Arnhem, Northern Territory	11°10′17″S 136°42′00″E	
YJED		Jedburgh Airstrip	Jundah, Queensland	25°05′34″S 143°33′07″E	
YJEM		Jemalong Airstrip	Tullamore, New South Wales	32°31′23″S 147°34′47″E	
YJER		Jerilderie Airport	Jerilderie, New South Wales	35°22′12″S 145°43′30″E	
YJEY		Jeedamya Airstrip	Menzies, Western Australia	29°24′29″S 121°16′16″E	
YJGP		Jerramungup Airstrip	Needilup, Western Australia	33°55′06″S 118°54′16″E	
YJIB		Ji-Balbal Airstrip	West Arnhem, Northern Territory	12°17′37″S 134°37′46″E	
YJIG		Jiggalong Mission Aerodrome	Jigalong Community, Western Australia	23°21′39″S 120°46′03″E	
YJIN		Jindaybyne Airfield	Jindabyne, New South Wales	36°25′36″S 148°36′06″E	
YJIP		Jingalup Airstrip	Jingalup, Western Australia	33°59′27″S 116°59′24″E	
YJIR		Ji-Marda Airstrip	West Arnhem, Northern Territory	12°03′21″S 134°37′10″E	
YJLC	JCK	Julia Creek Airport	Julia Creek, Queensland	20°40′06″S 141°43′07″E	
YJMO		Jack Mann Oval Heliport	Middle Swan, Western Australia	31°51′57″S 116°00′54″E	
YJNK		Jinka Airstrip	Hart, Northern Territory	22°56′05″S 135°43′58″E	
YJNT		Janet Downs Airstrip	Isisford, Queensland	24°09′14″S 144°04′14″E	
YJNY		Jonroy Airstrip	Hurricane, Queensland	16°30′28″S 144°23′43″E	
YJOH		Johnson Airstrip	Muston, South Australia	35°48′36″S 137°44′00″E	
YJRK		Jarra Creek Airfield	Walter Hill, Queensland	17°53′22″S 145°49′33″E	Military
YJRO		Jericho Airstrip	Jericho, Queensland	23°35′07″S 146°07′59″E	
YJRX		Jindalee Receiver Airstrip	Bandya, Western Australia	28°19′37″S 121°59′46″E	Military
YJSR		Jessie River Airstrip	Melville Island, Tiwi Islands, Northern Territory	11°30′42″S 131°01′30″E	
YJST		Jamestown Hubert Wilkins Airport	Jamestown, South Australia	33°11′32″S 138°36′57″E	
YJTX		Jindalee Transmitter Heliport	Laverton, Western Australia	28°19′08″S 122°50′38″E	Military
YJUK		Tjukurla Airstrip	Tjukurla Community, Western Australia	24°22′15″S 128°44′22″E	
YJUN		Jundee Airport	Jundee Gold Mine, Western Australia	26°25′18″S 120°34′36″E	
YJUR	JUR	Jurien Bay Airport	Jurien Bay, Western Australia	30°18′12″S 115°03′19″E	Formerly YJNB
YJVM		Jervois Mine Airstrip	Anatye, Northern Territory	22°38′32″S 136°15′53″E	Closed
YJVS		Jervois Airstrip	Anatye, Northern Territory	22°54′48″S 136°07′12″E	
YJWB		Jowalbinna Airstrip	Laura, Queensland	15°44′00″S 144°16′01″E	Coordinates unverified

== YK ==
ICAO	IATA	Airport name	Community	Coordinates	Notes
YKAB		King Ash Bay Airstrip	Mcarthur, Northern Territory	15°55′43″S 136°29′14″E	
YKAE		Kalannie Airstrip	Kalannie, Western Australia	30°21′36″S 117°07′18″E	
YKAJ		Kajabbi Airstrip	Three Rivers, Queensland	20°01′51″S 140°01′57″E	
YKAL	UBU	Kalumburu Airport	Kalumburu, Western Australia	14°17′17″S 126°38′04″E	
YKAM		Kiama Heliport	Kiama, New South Wales	34°40′08″S 150°50′48″E	
YKAN		Kanandah Aerodrome	Rawlinna, Western Australia	30°53′59″S 124°51′43″E	
YKAP		Kapunda Airstrip	Allendale North, South Australia	34°14′49″S 138°54′51″E	
YKAR	KQR	Karara Airport	Karara, Western Australia	29°13′00″S 116°41′12″E	
YKAT		Katoomba Airport	Katoomba, New South Wales	33°40′06″S 150°19′24″E	
YKAY		Kayrunnera Aerodrome	Mutawintji, New South Wales	30°40′45″S 142°32′14″E	
YKBA		Ken's Bore Airport	Cane, Western Australia	22°09′35″S 116°09′33″E	
YKBG		Koolyanobbing Range Airstrip	Koolyanobbing, Western Australia	30°50′24″S 119°31′55″E	
YKBL	KDB	Kambalda Airport	Kambalda, Western Australia	31°11′24″S 121°35′54″E	
YKBO		Kybo Station Airstrip	Forrest, Western Australia	31°00′10″S 126°34′57″E	
YKBR	KAX	Kalbarri Airport	Kalbarri, Western Australia	27°41′30″S 114°15′36″E	
YKBS		Kimberley Downs Aerodrome	Mount Hardman, Western Australia	17°23′55″S 124°21′20″E	
YKBT		Kalabity Station Aerodrome	Kalabity, South Australia	31°53′31″S 140°19′38″E	
YKBY		Streaky Bay Airport	Streaky Bay, South Australia	32°50′01″S 134°17′36″E	
YKCA	KBJ	Kings Canyon Airport	Watarrka National Park, Northern Territory	24°15′37″S 131°29′20″E	
YKCH		Kitchener Airstrip	Zanthus, Western Australia	31°01′41″S 124°11′14″E	
YKCK		Killiecrankie Airfield	Killiecrankie, Tasmania	39°50′56″S 147°51′29″E	
YKCS	KCS	Kings Creek Station Airport	Kings Creek Station, Northern Territory	24°25′13″S 131°49′08″E	
YKCY		Kilcoy Airfield	Winya, Queensland	26°58′16″S 152°34′00″E	
YKDA		Knapdale Airstrip	Evanslea, Queensland	27°30′25″S 151°30′21″E	
YKDD		Koodaideri Mine Airport	Newman, Western Australia	22°30′19″S 119°04′34″E	
YKDI		Kadina Airport	Kadina, South Australia	33°58′12″S 137°39′36″E	
YKDL		Kondoolka Aerodrome	Kondoolka, South Australia	32°01′26″S 134°51′40″E	
YKDM		Kidman Springs Airstrip	Victoria River, Northern Territory	16°06′56″S 130°57′09″E	
YKDN		Kondinin Airstrip	Kondinin, Western Australia	32°28′03″S 118°16′11″E	
YKEB		Kellerberrin Airstrip	Kellerberrin, Western Australia	31°37′01″S 117°43′08″E	
YKEL		Kelvin Station Airstrip	Dangarsleigh, New South Wales	30°39′18″S 151°38′17″E	
YKEN		Kenmore Park Airstrip	Yunyarinyi, South Australia	26°20′11″S 132°28′35″E	
YKEP		Lake Keepit Airstrip	Keepit Dam, New South Wales	30°53′24″S 150°31′36″E	
YKER	KRA	Kerang Airport	Kerang, Victoria	35°45′06″S 143°56′24″E	
YKEY		Keytah Airstrip	Moree, New South Wales	29°29′15″S 149°30′47″E	
YKFC		Kingfisher Camp Airstrip	Nicholson, Queensland	17°50′58″S 138°17′19″E	
YKFS		Kindra Falls Airstrip	Coolamon, New South Wales	34°43′27″S 147°08′39″E	
YKGA		Kingoonya Aerodrome	Wilgena Station, South Australia	30°54′52″S 135°18′26″E	
YKGU		Kagaru Airstrip	Kagaru, Queensland	27°50′57″S 152°55′43″E	
YKHA		Khancoban Airstrip	Khancoban, New South Wales	36°12′57″S 148°06′49″E	
YKHO		Kholo Heliport	Kholo, Queensland	27°29′51″S 152°46′28″E	
YKIA		Kiana Station Airstrip	Calvert, Northern Territory	17°14′42″S 136°10′51″E	
YKIB		Kimbolton Airstrip	Kimbolton, Western Australia	16°41′54″S 123°50′00″E	
YKIC		Kiwirrkurra Airstrip	Gibson Desert North, Western Australia	22°48′40″S 127°44′04″E	
YKID		Kidston Airstrip	Einasleigh, Queensland	18°52′15″S 144°10′24″E	
YKIG		Kingston Airstrip	Kingston SE, South Australia	36°49′12″S 139°52′12″E	
YKIH		Kihee Homestead Airstrip	Durham, Queensland	27°23′25″S 142°37′37″E	
YKII	KNS	King Island Airport	King Island, Tasmania	39°52′39″S 143°52′42″E	
YKIL		Kildurk Airstrip	Baines, Northern Territory	16°25′54″S 129°36′54″E	
YKIN		Kinchega Airstrip	Menindee, New South Wales	32°27′51″S 142°20′37″E	
YKIR		Kirkimbie Station Airstrip	Buchanan, Northern Territory	17°46′45″S 129°12′36″E	
YKIS		Kangaroo Island Heliport	Karatta, South Australia	35°59′09″S 136°50′04″E	
YKIU		Kaiuroo Airstrip	Mackenzie, Central Highlands Region, Queensland	23°05′20″S 149°25′55″E	
YKJN		King Junction Airstrip	Palmer, Queensland	15°53′07″S 143°30′38″E	
YKKA		Kapooka Heliport	Kapooka, New South Wales	35°09′24″S 147°17′06″E	Closed
YKKG	KFG	Kalkgurung Airport	Kalkarindji, Northern Territory	17°25′55″S 130°48′29″E	
YKKH		Kokatha Aerodrome	Kokatha, South Australia	31°17′24″S 135°14′23″E	
YKKN		Kin Kin Retreat Airstrip	Upper Warren, Western Australia	34°22′44″S 116°19′22″E	
YKLA	KOH	Koolatah Airport	Koolatah, Queensland	15°53′19″S 142°26′22″E	
YKLB	KKP	Koolburra Airport	Koolburra, Queensland	15°19′08″S 143°57′18″E	
YKLC		Koolan Central Airport	Koolan Island, Western Australia	16°07′33″S 123°44′05″E	
YKLE		Killarney Airstrip	Victoria River, Northern Territory	16°15′01″S 131°44′49″E	
YKLG		Kalinga Airstrip	Laura, Queensland	15°12′10″S 143°51′01″E	
YKLI		Koolan Island Village Airstrip	Koolan Island, Western Australia	16°07′44″S 123°46′46″E	
YKLL		Kallala Aerodrome	Waverley, Queensland	21°45′38″S 138°53′09″E	
YKLN		Killarney Station Airstrip	Dixie, Queensland	15°25′23″S 143°29′43″E	
YKLP		Killara Park Airstrip	Ilfracombe, Queensland	23°46′09″S 144°45′22″E	
YKLR		Kalamurina Airstrip	Kalamurina Sanctuary, South Australia	27°43′07″S 138°15′41″E	
YKLS		Kailis Airstrip	Wilyabrup, Western Australia	33°45′48″S 115°02′36″E	
YKMB	KRB	Karumba Airport	Karumba, Queensland	17°27′18″S 140°49′54″E	
YKMH		Mission Beach Heliport	Mission Beach, Queensland	17°52′52″S 146°05′30″E	
YKML	KML	Kamileroi Airport	Kamileroi, Queensland	19°22′29″S 140°03′22″E	
YKMN		Karmona Airstrip	Durham, Queensland	27°22′11″S 141°55′51″E	
YKMP	KPS	Kempsey Airport	Kempsey, New South Wales	31°04′28″S 152°46′11″E	
YKNA		Kanpa Airstrip	Kanpa, Western Australia	26°31′58″S 125°37′09″E	
YKNC		Kencherang Airstrip	Aurukun, Queensland	13°50′48″S 141°35′26″E	Closed
YKND		Kindamindi Airstrip	Mallowa, New South Wales	29°37′32″S 149°06′49″E	
YKNG	KNI	Katanning Airport	Katanning, Western Australia	33°41′58″S 117°39′18″E	
YKNM		Koonmarra Airstrip	Meekatharra, Western Australia	26°16′29″S 117°47′20″E	
YKNP		Kununoppin Airstrip	South Kununoppin, Western Australia	31°07′25″S 117°54′22″E	
YKNT		Kintore Airstrip	Kintore, Northern Territory	23°15′52″S 129°22′44″E	
YKNV		Kaniva Airstrip	Kaniva, Victoria	36°20′13″S 141°15′57″E	
YKOA		Koarlo Airstrip	Kurumbul, Queensland	28°37′58″S 150°32′02″E	
YKOG		Koongarra Airstrip	Willenabrina, Victoria	36°00′00″S 142°13′01″E	Coordinates unverified
YKOJ		Kojonup Airstrip	Kojonup, Western Australia	33°45′45″S 117°08′12″E	
YKOK		Kookynie Airstrip	Kookynie, Western Australia	29°20′36″S 121°29′35″E	
YKOL		Kolendo Aerodrome	Kolendo, South Australia	32°24′57″S 136°17′53″E	
YKOO		Koolama Bay Seaplane Base	Oombulgurri Community, Western Australia	13°56′15″S 127°19′30″E	
YKOR		Korumburra Heliport	Korumburra, Victoria	38°25′39″S 145°49′05″E	
YKOW	KWM	Kowanyama Airport	Kowanyama, Queensland	15°29′06″S 141°45′06″E	
YKPG		Kapalga Airstrip	Kakadu, Northern Territory	12°34′01″S 132°19′32″E	
YKPI		Kondaparinga Airstrip	Mount Mulligan, Queensland	16°40′55″S 144°47′12″E	Closed
YKPN		Kempton Airstrip	Kempton, Tasmania	42°32′02″S 147°11′45″E	Closed
YKPR	KPP	Kalpowar Airport	Kalpowar, Queensland	14°53′24″S 144°13′12″E	
YKRE		Karonie Airstrip	Emu Flat, Western Australia	30°58′34″S 122°32′31″E	
YKRI		Kuri Bay Seaplane Base	Prince Regent River, Western Australia	15°29′19″S 124°32′55″E	
YKRJ		Karunjie Airstrip	Durack, Western Australia	16°16′21″S 127°11′24″E	
YKRK		Kirkalocka Airstrip	Daggar Hills, Western Australia	28°41′32″S 117°45′52″E	
YKRL		Keeroongooloo Airstrip	Eromanga, Queensland	25°54′20″S 142°48′15″E	
YKRU		Mallowa/Krui Airport	Millie, New South Wales	29°40′28″S 149°26′58″E	
YKRV		Kendall River Airstrip	Holroyd River, Queensland	13°44′38″S 142°07′52″E	
YKRW		Kierawonga Airstrip	Lotus Creek, Queensland	22°30′19″S 149°08′23″E	
YKRY	KGY	Kingaroy Airport	Kingaroy, Queensland	26°34′41″S 151°50′22″E	
YKSC	KGC	Kingscote Airport	Kingscote, Kangaroo Island, South Australia	35°42′50″S 137°31′18″E	
YKSI		Keswick Island Airstrip	Keswick Island, Queensland	20°55′12″S 149°25′22″E	
YKSK		Keswick Barracks Heliport	Keswick, South Australia	34°56′46″S 138°34′54″E	
YKST		Kennetts Strip Heliport	Luddenham, New South Wales	33°49′58″S 150°44′37″E	
YKTA		Kotta Airport	Kotta, Victoria	36°10′48″S 144°31′36″E	
YKTH		Keith Aerodrome	Laffer, South Australia	36°06′51″S 140°15′08″E	
YKTN		Kyneton Airport	Kyneton, Victoria	37°13′30″S 144°26′48″E	
YKUA		Kulali Aerodrome	Talwood, Queensland	28°40′21″S 149°11′35″E	
YKUB	KUG	Kubin Airport	Kubin, Queensland	10°13′35″S 142°13′10″E	
YKUK		Kukerin Airstrip	North Kukerin, Western Australia	33°10′30″S 118°04′54″E	
YKUL		Kulgera Airstrip	Ghan, Northern Territory	25°50′33″S 133°17′36″E	
YKUM		Ruby Jo Heliport	Kumbarilla, Queensland	27°13′46″S 150°52′19″E	
YKUP		Darling Downs Airspray Airstrip	Ranges Bridge, Queensland	27°11′38″S 151°06′58″E	
YKUR		Kurundi Airstrip	Davenport, Northern Territory	20°30′36″S 134°40′14″E	
YKUW		Kurweeton Airstrip	Derrinallum, Victoria	38°02′52″S 143°09′20″E	
YKUY		Kurray Airstrip	St George, Queensland	28°13′18″S 148°34′41″E	
YKVA		King Vale Airstrip	Laura, Queensland	15°42′42″S 143°44′51″E	
YKWA		Karlawinda Mine Airstrip	Capricorn, Western Australia	23°46′53″S 120°08′10″E	
YKWG		Kangaroo Well Aerodrome	Moonaree, South Australia	31°46′24″S 135°38′05″E	
YKWR		Koo Wee Rup (Aardel Port) Airstrip	Koo Wee Rup, Victoria	38°10′08″S 145°29′12″E	
YKYB		Kyabram Airfield	Kyabram, Victoria	36°19′55″S 144°58′24″E	
YKYE		Kyneton Airstrip	Barcaldine, Queensland	23°49′08″S 145°24′11″E	
YKYN		Kynuna Airstrip	Kynuna, Queensland	21°35′56″S 141°56′34″E	
YKYR		Kyabra Airstrip	Eromanga, Queensland	26°17′42″S 143°09′40″E	
YKYT		Keyneton Heliport	Keyneton, South Australia	34°33′19″S 139°08′00″E	
YKYW		Kywong Aerodrome	Corfield, Queensland	22°15′31″S 143°36′41″E	

== YL ==
ICAO	IATA	Airport name	Community	Coordinates	Notes
YLAB		Landsborough Airstrip	Landsborough, Queensland	26°49′23″S 152°58′39″E	
YLAE		La Belle Downs Airstrip	Rakula, Northern Territory	13°06′47″S 130°29′57″E	
YLAG		Lagoon Bay Airstrip	Dunalley, Tasmania	42°53′13″S 147°57′17″E	
YLAH	LWH	Lawn Hill Airport	Lawn Hill, Queensland	18°34′35″S 138°35′05″E	
YLAK		Lakeside Airpark	Bloomsbury, Queensland	20°40′51″S 148°37′49″E	
YLAM		Lambina Aerodrome	Lambina, South Australia	26°55′01″S 134°03′17″E	
YLAN		Langawirra Aerodrome	Mutawintji, New South Wales	31°26′32″S 142°08′16″E	
YLAO		Lameroo Airstrip	Lameroo, South Australia	35°22′00″S 140°33′00″E	
YLAP		Lapunyah Aerodrome	Lundavra, Queensland	28°01′26″S 150°01′48″E	
YLAQ		Laguna Quays Resort Airstrip	Bloomsbury, Queensland	20°36′26″S 148°39′18″E	
YLAW		Lawlers Airport	Lawlers Gold Mine, Western Australia	28°05′24″S 120°32′24″E	
YLBA		Labona Airstrip	Belyando, Queensland	22°00′16″S 146°21′50″E	
YLBD		Lombadina Airport	Dampier Peninsula, Western Australia	16°30′55″S 122°55′25″E	
YLBG		Mount Liebig Airstrip	Mount Liebig, Northern Territory	23°14′36″S 131°15′36″E	
YLBO		Lake Bolac Aerodrome	Lake Bolac, Victoria	37°41′21″S 142°52′21″E	
YLCG		Lake Cargelligo Airport	Lake Cargelligo, New South Wales	33°16′42″S 146°22′12″E	
YLCK		Lassie Creek Station Airstrip	Paluma, Queensland	19°23′46″S 145°51′00″E	
YLCS		Locksley Field Airstrip	Locksley, Victoria	36°48′54″S 145°20′54″E	
YLDB		Lady Barron Aerodrome	Lady Barron, Tasmania	40°11′45″S 148°14′44″E	
YLDC		Landers Creek Airstrip	Mulgrave, Queensland	19°58′32″S 147°13′14″E	
YLDG		Lady Barron Grass Aerodrome	Lady Barron, Tasmania	40°12′23″S 148°14′06″E	
YLDL		Lissadell Airstrip	Lake Argyle, Western Australia	16°39′40″S 128°35′38″E	
YLDN		Linden Airstrip	Auburn, Queensland	25°57′21″S 150°32′38″E	
YLDO		Landor Station Airstrip	Gascoyne River, Western Australia	25°07′14″S 116°56′19″E	
YLDS		Linda Downs Airstrip	Carrandotta, Queensland	22°12′17″S 138°42′43″E	
YLEA		Leeman Aerodrome	Leeman, Western Australia	29°58′12″S 114°58′59″E	
YLEC	LGH	Leigh Creek Airport	Leigh Creek, South Australia	30°35′47″S 138°25′31″E	
YLED		Lethbridge Airpark	Lethbridge, Victoria	37°55′06″S 144°06′06″E	
YLEE		Leeton Airstrip	Leeton, New South Wales	34°29′59″S 146°26′48″E	
YLEG		Leongatha Airport	Leongatha, Victoria	38°29′42″S 145°51′36″E	
YLEM		Lemont Airstrip	Lemont, Tasmania	42°19′07″S 147°37′04″E	
YLEO	LNO	Leonora Airport	Leonora, Western Australia	28°52′41″S 121°18′53″E	
YLET		Lakes Entrance Airfield	Kalimna West, Victoria	37°51′10″S 147°57′04″E	
YLEV	LEL	Lake Evella Airport	Gapuwiyak, Northern Territory	12°29′54″S 135°48′18″E	
YLFD	LFP	Lakefield Airport	Lakefield, Queensland	14°55′15″S 144°12′11″E	
YLGA		Mulga Downs Airstrip	Mulga Downs Station, Western Australia	22°06′16″S 118°28′22″E	
YLGB		La Grange Bay Airstrip	Lagrange, Western Australia	18°41′13″S 121°48′41″E	
YLGC		Lake Grace Airstrip	Lake Grace, Western Australia	33°06′25″S 118°23′22″E	
YLGD		Longdown Airfield	Longford, Tasmania	41°41′28″S 147°08′36″E	
YLGH		Langhorne Aerodrome	Wellington, South Australia	35°18′13″S 139°16′02″E	
YLGL		Laglan Airstrip	Laglan, Queensland	22°29′24″S 146°39′54″E	
YLGN		Loongana Aerodrome	Forrest, Western Australia	30°56′27″S 127°01′44″E	
YLGU		Legune Airstrip	Baines, Northern Territory	15°12′55″S 129°26′42″E	
YLHI	LDH	Lord Howe Island Airport	Lord Howe Island, New South Wales	31°32′18″S 159°04′38″E	
YLHL		Long Hill Airstrip	Sassafras, Tasmania	41°20′00″S 146°30′00″E	Coordinates unverified
YLHO		Hunter Valley Heliport	Lemington, New South Wales	32°28′05″S 150°58′59″E	
YLHR	IRG	Lockhart River Airport	Lockhart River, Queensland	12°47′13″S 143°18′17″E	
YLHS	LTP	Lyndhurst Airport	Lyndhurst, Queensland	19°11′45″S 144°22′16″E	
YLIB		FSO Liberdade Heliport	Timor Sea, offshore Western Australia	11°02′58″S 126°37′06″E	
YLID		Liddell Heliport	Ravensworth, New South Wales	32°25′04″S 151°02′00″E	
YLIH		Lismore Base Hospital Heliport	Lismore, New South Wales	28°48′33″S 153°17′32″E	
YLIL		Lilydale Airport	Lilydale, Victoria	37°41′30″S 145°22′00″E	
YLIM		Limbunya Airstrip	Buchanan, Northern Territory	17°14′08″S 129°52′55″E	
YLIN	LDC	Lindeman Island Airport	Lindeman Island, Queensland	20°27′13″S 149°02′24″E	
YLIS	LSY	Lismore Airport	Lismore, New South Wales	28°49′41″S 153°15′36″E	Formerly YLSM
YLIT		Litchfield Airstrip	Daly River, Northern Territory	13°26′06″S 130°30′08″E	
YLIV		Liveringa Station Airstrip	Camballin, Western Australia	17°56′39″S 124°15′17″E	
YLJN		Lake Johnston Airport	Norseman, Western Australia	32°19′06″S 120°33′18″E	
YLJY		Lake Jindabyne Airstrip	Jindabyne, New South Wales	36°22′21″S 148°36′11″E	
YLKD		Lucky Downs Airstrip	Greenvale, Queensland	18°54′38″S 144°59′49″E	
YLKE		Kalimna Airport	Lakes Entrance, Victoria	37°51′08″S 147°57′16″E	
YLKG		Lake King Aerodrome	Lake King, Western Australia	33°04′45″S 119°45′58″E	
YLKM		Lake Marimley Airstrip	Balranald, New South Wales	34°23′29″S 143°40′06″E	
YLKN	LNH	Lake Nash Airport	Alpurrurulam, Northern Territory	20°58′51″S 137°55′04″E	
YLKS		The Lakes Airstrip	Johns River, New South Wales	31°42′53″S 152°43′29″E	
YLKT		Lockhart Airstrip	Lockhart, New South Wales	35°12′18″S 146°43′44″E	
YLLA		Mobella Aerodrome	Commonwealth Hill Station, South Australia	29°47′52″S 133°20′53″E	Military
YLLC		Lilla Creek Airstrip	Ghan, Northern Territory	25°33′28″S 134°04′16″E	
YLLD		Langlo Downs Airstrip	Scrubby Creek, Blackall-Tambo Region, Queensland	25°31′04″S 145°46′18″E	
YLLE	BBL	Ballera Airport	Durham, Queensland	27°24′30″S 141°48′30″E	
YLLR		Lake Leaghur Airstrip	Leaghur, Victoria	35°59′00″S 143°48′00″E	Coordinates unverified
YLLT		Lower Light Aerodrome	Lower Light, South Australia	34°30′56″S 138°25′44″E	
YLMA		Balma Airstrip	East Arnhem, Northern Territory	13°14′51″S 135°50′56″E	
YLMB		Lambrook Aerodrome	Mullaley, New South Wales	31°06′33″S 149°56′15″E	
YLMI		Lady Musgrave Island Seaplane Base	Coral Sea Islands	23°54′19″S 152°23′52″E	
YLMQ	BEO	Lake Macquarie Airport	Pelican, New South Wales	33°04′00″S 151°38′54″E	
YLMR		Lillimur Airstrip	Lillimur, Victoria	36°22′44″S 141°04′55″E	Closed
YLMU		Mungo Lodge Aerodrome	Arumpo, New South Wales	33°44′42″S 143°00′06″E	
YLND	LKD	Lakeland Downs Airport	Lakeland, Queensland	15°50′09″S 144°50′51″E	
YLNG		Prelude FLNG Heliport	Timor Sea, offshore Western Australia	13°47′10″S 123°18′50″E	
YLNR		Landor Races Aerodrome	East Lyons River, Western Australia	24°55′53″S 116°58′01″E	
YLOC		Lochinvar Airstrip	Telfer, Western Australia	20°45′30″S 121°01′01″E	Coordinates unverified
YLOD		Longwood Airstrip	Longwood East, Victoria	36°48′51″S 145°27′57″E	
YLOH		Louth Airstrip	Louth, New South Wales	30°31′53″S 145°07′43″E	
YLOK	LOC	Lock Airport	Lock, South Australia	33°32′39″S 135°41′35″E	
YLOO		Wyloo Station Airstrip	Nanutarra, Western Australia	22°41′49″S 116°14′08″E	
YLOR	LOA	Lorraine Airport	Lorraine, Queensland	19°00′23″S 139°53′58″E	
YLOU		Louisa Downs Airstrip	Mueller Ranges, Western Australia	18°42′40″S 126°42′33″E	
YLOV	LTV	Lotus Vale Station Airport	Lotus Vale Station, Queensland	17°02′54″S 141°22′35″E	
YLOW		Lowendal Islands Heliport	Varanus Island, Western Australia	20°39′16″S 115°34′37″E	
YLOX		Loxton Airport	Loxton, South Australia	34°28′30″S 140°39′48″E	
YLOY		Longwarry Airstrip	Longwarry, Victoria	38°06′21″S 145°46′29″E	
YLPD		Leopold Downs Airstrip	Wunaamin Miliwundi Ranges, Western Australia	17°45′35″S 125°22′43″E	
YLPE		Leppington Pastoral East Heliport	Greendale, New South Wales	33°55′06″S 150°41′57″E	
YLPS		Lawsons Plains Airstrip	West Coast, Tasmania	41°05′54″S 145°11′12″E	Closed
YLPW		Leppington Pastoral West Heliport	Greendale, New South Wales	33°55′27″S 150°40′59″E	
YLRA	LUU	Laura Airport	Laura, Queensland	15°33′39″S 144°27′06″E	
YLRD	LHG	Lightning Ridge Airport	Lightning Ridge, New South Wales	29°27′24″S 147°59′06″E	
YLRE	LRE	Longreach Airport	Longreach, Queensland	23°25′53″S 144°16′41″E	
YLRG		Lorna Glen Homestead Aerodrome	Wiluna, Western Australia	26°13′53″S 121°33′31″E	
YLRN		Lorraine Station Airstrip	Corfield, Queensland	22°33′57″S 143°31′07″E	Closed
YLRS	LUT	New Laura Airport	Laura Station, Queensland	15°10′58″S 144°20′44″E	
YLRV		Little River Aerodrome	Little River, Victoria	37°55′01″S 144°29′01″E	
YLSB		Sydney Life Saver Base Heliport	La Perouse, New South Wales	33°59′38″S 151°14′59″E	
YLSK		Luskintyre Airfield	Luskintyre, New South Wales	32°40′00″S 151°25′15″E	
YLSS		Lansdowne Airstrip	Lansdowne, Queensland	25°04′17″S 146°15′55″E	Closed
YLST	LER	Leinster Airport	Leinster, Western Australia	27°50′36″S 120°42′12″E	
YLSY		Mount Lindsay Airstrip	Watarru, South Australia	27°02′03″S 129°54′04″E	
YLTH		Hagley Airstrip	Hagley, Tasmania	41°32′08″S 146°53′23″E	Closed
YLTN	LVO	Laverton Airport	Laverton, Western Australia	28°36′49″S 122°25′26″E	
YLTT		Lady Elliot Island Airstrip	Lady Elliot Island, Queensland	24°06′46″S 152°42′56″E	
YLTV	LTB	Latrobe Valley Airport	Morwell, Victoria	38°12′26″S 146°28′13″E	
YLUC		Lucy Creek Airstrip	Anatye, Northern Territory	22°28′20″S 136°16′45″E	
YLUI		Lucindale Airstrip	Lucindale, South Australia	36°58′18″S 140°21′07″E	
YLUL		Mooleulooloo Aerodrome	Mooleulooloo, South Australia	31°38′36″S 140°30′47″E	
YLUM		Lumley Hill Heliport	Whitfield, Queensland	16°52′58″S 145°44′17″E	
YLUN		Laurinel Airstrip	Balcomba, Queensland	23°15′12″S 149°33′55″E	
YLUW		Leeuwin Estate Airstrip	Witchcliffe, Western Australia	34°01′15″S 115°03′52″E	
YLVA		Lily Vale Airstrip	Yarraden, Queensland	14°29′29″S 143°40′42″E	Formerly YLLV
YLVB		Lovely Banks Aerodrome	Lovely Banks, Victoria	38°02′00″S 144°19′59″E	Closed
YLVD		Lake Everard Aerodrome	Lake Everard, South Australia	31°43′58″S 135°01′43″E	
YLVK		Lavarack Barracks	Townsville, Queensland	19°19′18″S 146°48′06″E	
YLVY		Lake Varley Aerodrome	Holt Rock, Western Australia	32°43′10″S 119°30′21″E	
YLWB		Lockyer Waters/Breefield Airstrip	Morton Vale, Queensland	27°28′14″S 152°23′17″E	
YLWY		Lake Way Airstrip	Wiluna, Western Australia	26°56′48″S 120°28′31″E	
YLYD		Lyndley Airstrip	Cooranga, Queensland	26°49′38″S 151°13′48″E	
YLYH		Lyndhurst Landing Ground	Lyndhurst, South Australia	30°16′23″S 138°21′59″E	
YLYK		Lyndoch Airstrip	Lyndoch, South Australia	34°37′05″S 138°54′41″E	
YLYN		Lyndon Aerodrome	Lyndon, Western Australia	23°38′29″S 115°14′07″E	
YLZI	LZR	Lizard Island Airport	Lizard Island, Queensland	14°40′24″S 145°27′18″E	

== YM ==
ICAO	IATA	Airport name	Community	Coordinates	Notes
YMAA	UBB	Mabuiag Island Airport	Mabuiag Island, Torres Strait Islands, Queensland	09°57′00″S 142°11′42″E	
YMAC		Macumba Aerodrome	Macumba Station, South Australia	27°15′42″S 135°38′17″E	
YMAD		Madura Aerodrome	Madura, Western Australia	31°53′16″S 127°01′32″E	
YMAE	MYI	Murray Island Airport	Mer Island, Queensland	09°54′53″S 144°03′15″E	
YMAF		Mansfield Heliport	Mansfield, Victoria	37°03′15″S 146°05′09″E	
YMAG		Manangatang Aerodrome	Manangatang, Victoria	35°02′48″S 142°51′42″E	Closed
YMAI		Manguri Aerodrome	Mount Clarence Station, South Australia	28°59′13″S 134°23′29″E	
YMAJ		Marigaldjban Airstrip	West Arnhem, Northern Territory	12°14′27″S 134°03′57″E	
YMAK		Mabel Creek Aerodrome	Mabel Creek, South Australia	28°55′44″S 134°19′43″E	
YMAL		Manilla Airstrip	Manilla, New South Wales	30°45′52″S 150°43′31″E	
YMAM		Mona Mona Heliport	Mona Mona, Queensland	16°43′58″S 145°30′42″E	
YMAP		Mapuru Airstrip	East Arnhem, Northern Territory	12°15′19″S 135°26′40″E	
YMAR		Mataranka Township Airstrip	Mataranka, Northern Territory	14°55′27″S 133°03′43″E	
YMAS		Manilla Station Airstrip	Pooncarie, New South Wales	33°22′50″S 142°08′26″E	
YMAT		Mater Hospital Heliport	South Brisbane, Queensland	27°29′08″S 153°01′42″E	
YMAU		Mount Augusta Airstrip	East Lyons River, Western Australia	24°18′06″S 116°54′24″E	
YMAV	AVV	Avalon Airport	Avalon, Victoria	38°02′22″S 144°28′10″E	
YMAW		May Downs Airstrip	Valkyrie, Queensland	22°24′33″S 148°55′46″E	
YMAX		Manbulloo Airfield	Manbulloo, Northern Territory	14°35′59″S 132°11′26″E	
YMAY	ABX	Albury Airport	Albury, New South Wales	36°04′06″S 146°57′30″E	
YMBA	MRG	Mareeba Airport	Mareeba, Queensland	17°04′09″S 145°25′09″E	
YMBB		Mount Baw Baw Heliport	Mount Baw Baw Alpine Resort, Victoria	37°50′24″S 146°15′47″E	
YMBD		Murray Bridge Airport	Murray Bridge, South Australia	35°04′00″S 139°13′36″E	
YMBE		Mooliabeenie Airstrip	Mooliabeenee, Western Australia	31°20′14″S 116°00′57″E	
YMBG		Marlborough Heliport	Marlborough, Queensland	22°48′53″S 149°53′17″E	
YMBL	MBB	Marble Bar Airport	Marble Bar, Western Australia	21°09′45″S 119°50′23″E	
YMBN		Mount Bundey Mine Airstrip	Mount Bundey, Northern Territory	12°50′55″S 131°34′33″E	
YMBO		Marmboo Airstrip	Longreach, Queensland	23°18′32″S 143°26′40″E	
YMBP		Membinup Airstrip	Condingup, Western Australia	33°52′36″S 122°36′49″E	
YMBR		Matheson Bore Airstrip	Mount Willoughby, South Australia	28°16′10″S 134°08′57″E	
YMBS		Montebello Islands Seaplane Base	Montebello Islands, Western Australia	20°27′17″S 115°31′48″E	
YMBT		Mount Beauty Airfield	Mount Beauty, Victoria	36°43′43″S 147°10′01″E	
YMBU		Maryborough Airport	Maryborough, Victoria	37°02′00″S 143°42′30″E	
YMBX		Mundrabilla Station Aerodrome	Mundrabilla, Western Australia	31°52′02″S 127°51′14″E	
YMBZ		Mount Ebenezer Airstrip	Ghan, Northern Territory	25°10′11″S 132°38′35″E	
YMCE		Mount Clere Homestead Airstrip	Gascoyne River, Western Australia	25°05′39″S 117°35′23″E	
YMCF		McCaffrey Field Airstrip	Bowenville, Queensland	27°21′01″S 151°30′57″E	
YMCI		Magnetic Island Heliport	Magnetic Island, Queensland	19°09′43″S 146°51′14″E	
YMCK		McKinlay Airstrip	McKinlay, Queensland	21°16′53″S 141°17′54″E	
YMCL		Mount Coolon Airstrip	Mount Coolon, Queensland	21°23′13″S 147°19′56″E	
YMCM		Mangoola Coal Mine Heliport	Wybong, New South Wales	32°17′43″S 150°42′29″E	
YMCO	XMC	Mallacoota Airport	Mallacoota, Victoria	37°35′56″S 149°43′15″E	
YMCR	MFP	Manners Creek Station Airport	Manners Creek Station, Northern Territory	22°06′00″S 137°58′59″E	
YMCS		Macrossan Airstrip	Ravenswood, Queensland	20°00′47″S 146°29′01″E	Military
YMCT	MLR	Millicent Airport	Millicent, South Australia	37°35′01″S 140°21′58″E	
YMCU		Mount Mcclure Airstrip	Lake Darlot, Western Australia	27°28′12″S 120°55′01″E	Coordinates unverified
YMCW		Moola Bulla (Morocco West) Airstrip	Mueller Ranges, Western Australia	18°11′51″S 127°29′35″E	
YMCY		Michaelmas Cay Seaplane Base	Coral Sea Islands	16°36′23″S 145°58′27″E	
YMDA		Mundubbera Airstrip	Mundubbera, Queensland	25°35′56″S 151°19′08″E	
YMDB		Mundabullangana Aerodrome	Mundabullangana, Western Australia	20°30′34″S 118°03′34″E	
YMDD		Mundowdna Airstrip	Mundowdna Station, South Australia	29°42′46″S 138°13′40″E	
YMDE		Mount Dore Airstrip	Selwyn, Queensland	21°40′23″S 140°31′11″E	
YMDG	DGE	Mudgee Airport	Mudgee, New South Wales	32°33′45″S 149°36′40″E	
YMDI	MQA	Mandora Station Airport	Mandora Station, Western Australia	19°44′17″S 120°50′17″E	
YMDK		Mount Riddock Airstrip	Hart, Northern Territory	23°02′11″S 134°41′27″E	
YMDN		Merredin Airport	Merredin, Western Australia	31°31′40″S 118°19′20″E	
YMDO		Madowla Park Airfield	Lower Moira, Victoria	36°05′27″S 144°59′28″E	
YMDP		Moondah Park Airstrip	Isisford, Queensland	24°18′48″S 143°44′19″E	
YMDR		Minderoo Station Airstrip	Talandji, Western Australia	21°59′36″S 115°02′42″E	
YMDS	MNW	MacDonald Downs Airport	Macdonald Downs, Northern Territory	22°26′38″S 135°11′56″E	
YMDT		Mundrabilla Motel Aerodrome	Mundrabilla, Western Australia	31°49′36″S 128°13′48″E	
YMDV		Mount Davies Airstrip	Pipalyatjara, South Australia	26°10′46″S 129°07′57″E	
YMDW		Maitland Downs Airstrip	Lakeland, Queensland	16°13′21″S 144°42′18″E	
YMDX		Melinda Downs Airstrip	Three Rivers, Queensland	19°45′57″S 140°22′58″E	
YMDY		Mount Bundey Training Area Airstrip	Mount Bundey, Northern Territory	12°53′24″S 131°54′26″E	Military
YMDZ		Mardi Station Airstrip	Mardie, Western Australia	21°12′36″S 115°57′45″E	
YMEA		Meander Lakes Airstrip	Westwood, Tasmania	41°29′51″S 147°01′33″E	
YMEB		Mount Eba Aerodrome	Mount Eba Station, South Australia	30°10′24″S 135°40′21″E	
YMED		Menindee Aerodrome	Menindee, New South Wales	32°22′00″S 142°24′18″E	
YMEE		Merlin Airstrip	Mcarthur, Northern Territory	16°49′12″S 136°19′52″E	
YMEG		Meningie Aerodrome	Meningie, South Australia	35°42′04″S 139°20′44″E	Formerly YNIN
YMEI		Mereenie Airstrip	Mereenie, Northern Territory	23°58′36″S 131°33′42″E	
YMEK	MKR	Meekatharra Airport	Meekatharra, Western Australia	26°36′42″S 118°32′52″E	
YMEL		Melton Airfield	Melton, Victoria	37°37′18″S 144°33′54″E	
YMEM		Memooloo Airstrip	Togara, Queensland	24°00′10″S 148°42′49″E	
YMEN	MEB	Essendon Airport	Essendon North, Victoria	37°43′41″S 144°54′07″E	
YMEO		Merton Airstrip	Merton, Victoria	36°58′04″S 145°42′27″E	
YMEP		Merapah Airstrip	Archer River, Queensland	13°43′28″S 142°24′41″E	
YMEQ		Melrose Airstrip	Longreach, Queensland	22°44′18″S 143°19′19″E	
YMER	MIM	Merimbula Airport	Merimbula, New South Wales	36°54′31″S 149°54′05″E	
YMES	SXE	RAAF East Sale	Sale, Victoria	38°05′56″S 147°08′58″E	
YMET		Melville Seaplane Base	South Perth, Western Australia	31°58′39″S 115°50′29″E	
YMEU	MLV	Merluna Airport	Merluna, Queensland	13°03′54″S 142°27′13″E	
YMEW		Mingenew Airstrip	Bundanoon, Western Australia	29°16′05″S 115°26′35″E	
YMEY		Mullaley Aerodrome	Mullaley, New South Wales	31°06′36″S 149°56′21″E	
YMFA		Auburnvale Airstrip	Missen Flat, Queensland	27°54′47″S 151°57′12″E	
YMFD		Mansfield Airstrip	Mansfield, Victoria	37°04′25″S 146°07′14″E	
YMGB	MGT	Milingimbi Airport	Milingimbi Island, Northern Territory	12°05′40″S 134°53′37″E	
YMGD	MNG	Maningrida Airport	Maningrida, Northern Territory	12°03′22″S 134°14′03″E	
YMGE		Mudgeegardaart Airstrip	West Arnhem, Northern Territory	11°56′10″S 132°49′30″E	
YMGF		Mildura Glider Field Aerodrome	Koorlong, Victoria	34°15′29″S 142°03′28″E	
YMGG		Mulgathing Aerodrome	Mulgathing, South Australia	30°13′39″S 133°59′18″E	Military
YMGI		Mungindi Airport	Mungindi, New South Wales	28°58′00″S 149°03′00″E	
YMGJ		Mirrngatja Airstrip	East Arnhem, Northern Territory	12°39′15″S 135°11′41″E	
YMGL		Maggieville Airstrip	Howitt, Queensland	17°27′14″S 141°10′04″E	
YMGM		Mungabroom Airstrip	Pamayu, Northern Territory	17°49′19″S 134°33′14″E	Closed
YMGN	GSN	Mount Gunson Airport	Mount Gunson, South Australia	31°27′35″S 137°10′28″E	
YMGO		Murgoo Aerodrome	South Murchison, Western Australia	27°22′00″S 116°25′01″E	
YMGP		Mount Gibson Mine Airstrip	Paynes Find, Western Australia	29°44′45″S 117°07′07″E	
YMGR	MGV	Margaret River Station Airport	Margaret River Station, Western Australia	18°37′18″S 126°52′59″E	
YMGS		Mount Morgans Airstrip	Laverton, Western Australia	28°47′23″S 122°02′18″E	
YMGT	MQZ	Margaret River Airport	Margaret River, Western Australia	33°55′48″S 115°06′00″E	
YMGV	MVU	Musgrave Airport	Musgrave, Queensland	14°46′33″S 143°30′17″E	
YMHA		Mount Guide Airstrip	Waverley, Queensland	21°00′28″S 139°23′51″E	
YMHB	HBA	Hobart Airport	Cambridge, Tasmania	42°50′12″S 147°30′36″E	
YMHE		Mount Hale Airstrip	Meekatharra, Western Australia	26°01′49″S 117°20′10″E	
YMHL		Mount Holland Aerodrome	Mount Holland, Western Australia	32°06′30″S 119°45′36″E	
YMHM		Mount Hotham Village Heliport	Mount Hotham Alpine Resort, Victoria	36°58′48″S 147°08′34″E	
YMHN		Marchmont Airstrip	Ilfracombe, Queensland	23°07′08″S 144°44′49″E	
YMHO	MHO	Mount House Airport	Mount House Station, Western Australia	17°03′04″S 125°42′48″E	
YHMP		Mackay Base Hospital Heliport	West Mackay, Queensland	21°08′44″S 149°09′16″E	
YHMT		Mount Hart Station Airstrip	Wunaamin Miliwundi Ranges, Western Australia	16°49′24″S 124°54′50″E	
YMHU	MCV	McArthur River Mine Airport	McArthur River zinc mine, Northern Territory	16°26′42″S 136°04′30″E	
YMHW		Mount Howitt Aerodrome	Eromanga, Queensland	26°30′39″S 142°17′15″E	
YMIA	MQL	Mildura Airport	Mildura, Victoria	34°13′45″S 142°05′08″E	
YMIB		Mintable Airstrip	Anangu Pitjantjatjara Yankunytjatjara, South Australia	27°19′47″S 133°18′10″E	
YMID		Middle Cay Seaplane Base	Coral Sea Islands	16°39′26″S 145°59′24″E	
YMIE		Milne Reef Seaplane Base	Coral Sea Islands	16°46′54″S 146°16′18″E	
YMIG		Mittagong Airport	Mittagong, New South Wales	34°26′54″S 150°30′12″E	
YMIJ		Minjilang Airstrip	West Arnhem, Northern Territory	11°09′36″S 132°32′22″E	
YMIK		Millers Creek Airstrip	Millers Creek, South Australia	29°58′15″S 136°04′29″E	Military
YMIL		Milgun Airstrip	Peak Hill, Western Australia	25°05′12″S 118°17′38″E	
YMIN	XML	Minlaton Airport	Minlaton, South Australia	34°44′38″S 137°31′45″E	
YMIO		Mill Iron Airstrip	Tungamull, Queensland	23°19′33″S 150°41′50″E	
YMIP	MIH	Mitchell Plateau Airport	Mitchell River National Park, Western Australia	14°47′27″S 125°49′33″E	
YMIR	MWY	Miranda Downs Airport	Miranda Downs, Queensland	17°19′44″S 141°53′10″E	
YMIS		Millrose Homestead Airstrip	Wiluna, Western Australia	26°23′44″S 120°57′32″E	
YMIT	MTQ	Mitchell Airport	Mitchell, Queensland	26°29′10″S 147°56′38″E	
YMIU		Mildura Station Airstrip	Barcaldine, Queensland	23°16′01″S 145°16′40″E	
YMIV		Mount Ive Airstrip	Mount Ive, South Australia	32°26′39″S 136°04′08″E	
YMIX		Middalya Homestead Airstrip	Minilya, Western Australia	23°54′24″S 114°45′54″E	
YMJD		Millajiddee Airstrip	St George Ranges, Western Australia	18°50′40″S 124°55′36″E	
YMJE		Mount James Airstrip	Gascoyne River, Western Australia	24°38′03″S 116°56′37″E	
YMJI		Murranji Bore Airstrip	Tanami East, Northern Territory	16°50′11″S 132°48′22″E	
YMJM	MJP	Manjimup Airport	Manjimup, Western Australia	34°15′55″S 116°08′25″E	
YMJR		Majura Training Area Heliport	Canberra, Australian Capital Territory	35°14′49″S 149°11′41″E	
YMKA		Mararanka Homestead Airstrip	Mataranka, Northern Territory	14°55′44″S 133°08′08″E	
YMKB		Mukinbudin Aerodrome	Dandanning, Western Australia	30°55′06″S 118°15′17″E	
YMKC		Mistake Creek Airstrip	Buchanan, Northern Territory	17°05′29″S 129°02′46″E	Closed
YMKH		Mackay Harbour Seaplane Base	Mackay, Queensland	21°08′22″S 149°11′29″E	
YMKT		Emkaytee (Sandford) Aerodrome	Weddell, Northern Territory	12°36′36″S 131°03′10″E	
YMKV		Mikinj Valley Airstrip	West Arnhem, Northern Territory	12°28′48″S 133°04′11″E	
YMKY		Mount Mackay Heliport	Mount Mackay, Queensland	17°56′48″S 145°58′26″E	
YMLA		Malina Aerodrome	Sherlock, Western Australia	20°52′53″S 118°02′16″E	
YMLC		Mole Creek Airstrip	Mole Creek, Tasmania	41°32′00″S 146°19′59″E	Coordinates unverified
YMLD		Maitland Airport	Maitland, South Australia	34°23′34″S 137°42′26″E	
YMLE		Maryvale Airstrip	Basalt, Queensland	19°34′46″S 145°15′36″E	
YMLI		Meeragoolia Aerodrome	Inggarda, Western Australia	24°54′21″S 114°12′49″E	
YMLK		Minnamoolka Airstrip	Minnamoolka, Queensland	18°11′03″S 145°05′40″E	
YMLL		Millungera Airstrip	Taldora, Queensland	19°51′27″S 141°33′43″E	
YMLN		Monolon Aerodrome	White Cliffs, New South Wales	30°12′11″S 143°13′03″E	
YMLO		Millaroo Airstrip	Millaroo, Queensland	20°00′45″S 147°14′56″E	
YMLR		Muloorina Aerodrome	Muloorina, South Australia	29°14′48″S 137°54′36″E	
YMLS	WLE	Miles Airport	Miles, Queensland	26°48′33″S 150°09′54″E	
YMLT	LST	Launceston Airport	Launceston, Tasmania	41°32′42″S 147°12′54″E	
YMLV		Moyle River (Un-Marr) Airstrip	Nemarluk, Northern Territory	14°03′48″S 129°54′47″E	
YMLX		Milurie Homestead Aerodrome	Bandya, Western Australia	27°32′26″S 121°50′12″E	
YMMA		Mamadawerre Airstrip	West Arnhem, Northern Territory	12°15′22″S 133°39′29″E	
YMMB	MBW	Moorabbin Airport	Moorabbin, Victoria	37°58′33″S 145°06′08″E	
YMMD		McMaster Field Airstrip	Dixalea, Queensland	23°57′18″S 150°15′57″E	
YMMG		Merrinong Station Airstrip	Weilmoringle, New South Wales	29°01′25″S 147°05′46″E	
YMMH		Mount Mulgrave Homestead Airstrip	Mount Mulgrave, Queensland	16°22′34″S 143°59′27″E	
YMMI	WUI	Murrin Murrin Airport	Murrin Murrin, Western Australia	28°42′19″S 121°53′26″E	
YMML	MEL	Melbourne Airport	Melbourne, Victoria	37°40′24″S 144°50′36″E	
YMMN		Millmerran Airport	Millmerran, Queensland	27°51′48″S 151°16′30″E	
YMMO		Moama Airstrip	Moama, New South Wales	36°04′28″S 144°45′52″E	
YMMR		Mandemar Airstrip	Mandemar, New South Wales	34°26′41″S 150°17′23″E	
YMMT		Mount Margaret Airstrip	Eromanga, Queensland	26°56′03″S 143°19′41″E	
YMMU	MMM	Middlemount Airport	Middlemount, Queensland	22°48′05″S 148°42′25″E	
YMMY		Manmoyi Airstrip	West Arnhem, Northern Territory	12°32′25″S 134°06′49″E	
YMNA		Mount Allan Airstrip	Yuelamu, Northern Territory	22°16′30″S 132°13′01″E	
YMNB		Mount Barry Aerodrome	Mount Barry, South Australia	28°14′10″S 134°58′34″E	
YMND	MTL	Maitland Airport	Rutherford, New South Wales	32°42′12″S 151°29′18″E	
YMNE	WME	Mount Keith Airport	Mount Keith, Western Australia	27°17′11″S 120°33′17″E	
YMNF		Manfred Aerodrome	South Murchison, Western Australia	26°26′38″S 116°32′39″E	
YMNG		Mangalore Airport	Mangalore, Victoria	36°53′18″S 145°11′03″E	
YMNK	ONR	Monkira Airport	Monkira, Queensland	24°49′07″S 140°33′12″E	
YMNL		Murganalla (Wauk) Airstrip	West Arnhem, Northern Territory	11°32′58″S 132°55′11″E	
YMNN		Mount Denison Airstrip	Anmatjere, Northern Territory	22°08′15″S 132°04′12″E	
YMNO		Maneroo Airstrip	Longreach, Queensland	23°22′09″S 143°53′41″E	
YMNP		Murnpeowie Aerodrome	Murnpeowie, South Australia	29°35′30″S 139°03′07″E	
YMNS	MSF	Mount Swan Airport	Mount Swan, Northern Territory	22°37′29″S 135°02′04″E	
YMNT		Mornington Station Airstrip	Wunaamin Miliwundi Ranges, Western Australia	17°23′37″S 126°13′44″E	
YMNU		Mainoru Airstrip	Flying Fox, Northern Territory	14°03′12″S 134°05′39″E	
YMNX		Minura Airstrip	Leonora, Western Australia	28°54′46″S 121°47′56″E	
YMNY	OXY	Morney Airport	Morney, Queensland	25°21′30″S 141°26′00″E	
YMOA		Magowra Airstrip	Normanton, Queensland	17°46′37″S 140°52′22″E	
YMOD		Modewarre Aerodrome	Buckley, Victoria	38°15′38″S 144°05′31″E	
YMOE		Moonaree Airstrip	Moonaree, South Australia	31°57′58″S 135°52′30″E	
YMOF		Malakoff Airstrip	Stamford, Queensland	21°12′27″S 143°47′52″E	
YMOG	MMG	Mount Magnet Airport	Mount Magnet, Western Australia	28°06′58″S 117°50′30″E	
YMOH		Mount Cootha Heliport	Mount Coot-tha, Queensland	27°28′01″S 152°56′38″E	
YMOM		Moulamein Airstrip	Moulamein, New South Wales	35°03′30″S 144°01′17″E	
YMOO	OOR	Mooraberree Airport	Mooraberree, Queensland	25°15′00″S 140°58′59″E	
YMOR	MRZ	Moree Airport	Moree, New South Wales	29°29′56″S 149°50′41″E	
YMOT	MET	Moreton Airport	Moreton, Queensland	12°26′39″S 142°38′17″E	
YMOU		Moura Airport	Kianga, Queensland	24°36′42″S 149°59′47″E	
YMOX		Moxey Farms Airstrip	Paytens Bridge, New South Wales	33°31′01″S 148°21′11″E	
YMOY		Moyen Station Airstrip	Jundah, Queensland	25°04′30″S 142°53′32″E	
YMPA	MIN	Minnipa Airport	Minnipa, South Australia	32°50′35″S 135°08′40″E	
YMPC		RAAF Williams	Point Cook, Victoria	37°55′54″S 144°45′12″E	
YMPE		Mount Cooper Airstrip	Seventy Mile, Queensland	20°31′29″S 146°47′22″E	
YMPH		Mount Elephant Airstrip	Vite Vite, Victoria	37°54′11″S 143°10′39″E	
YMPK		Milton Park Airstrip	Burt Plain, Northern Territory	23°21′30″S 133°00′14″E	
YMPN		Mapoon Airstrip	Mapoon, Queensland	12°03′04″S 141°54′25″E	
YMPS		Morton Plains Airstrip	Enngonia, New South Wales	29°05′13″S 146°10′53″E	
YMPY		Mount Perry Airstrip	Mount Perry, Queensland	25°12′32″S 151°40′11″E	
YMQA	MQE	Marqua Airport	Marqua, Northern Territory	22°48′21″S 137°15′04″E	
YMQI		Macquarie Island Heliport	Macquarie Island, Tasmania	54°29′58″S 158°56′12″E	
YMRA		Maralinga Airstrip	Maralinga Tjarutja, South Australia	30°09′48″S 131°37′30″E	Military
YMRB	MOV	Moranbah Airport	Moranbah, Queensland	22°03′27″S 148°04′35″E	
YMRD		Marda Airstrip	Mount Jackson, Western Australia	30°10′39″S 119°17′59″E	
YMRE	RRE	Marree Airport	Marree, South Australia	29°39′46″S 138°03′57″E	
YMRG		Murgon Airstrip	Murgon, Queensland	26°15′11″S 151°55′50″E	
YMRI		Marian Airstrip	Marian, Queensland	21°09′11″S 148°56′37″E	Closed
YMRK		Marble Creek Airstrip	Rookwood, Queensland	16°55′59″S 144°14′00″E	Closed
YMRL		Marlgawo Airstrip	West Arnhem, Northern Territory	12°50′19″S 133°55′16″E	
YMRN		Marlwan Airstrip	West Arnhem, Northern Territory	12°07′33″S 133°51′34″E	
YMRO		Moora Airstrip	Moora, Western Australia	30°41′06″S 115°58′55″E	
YMRR		Moore Reef Seaplane Base	Coral Sea Islands	16°53′19″S 146°11′28″E	
YMRS		Melrose Airstrip	Lake Darlot, Western Australia	27°55′49″S 121°18′20″E	
YMRT		Mount Garnet Airstrip	Innot Hot Springs, Queensland	17°42′21″S 145°08′54″E	
YMRV		Moore River Airstrip	Konnongorring, Western Australia	31°00′35″S 116°48′33″E	Closed
YMRW	MWB	Morawa Airport	Morawa, Western Australia	29°12′05″S 116°01′19″E	
YMRX		Maroonah Aerodrome	Innawonga Community, Western Australia	23°29′39″S 115°32′31″E	
YMRY	MYA	Moruya Airport	Moruya, New South Wales	35°53′52″S 150°08′40″E	
YMSD		Mallison Island Seaplane Base	Mallison Island, Northern Territory	12°11′48″S 136°07′51″E	
YMSE		Morstone Downs Station	Camooweal, Queensland	19°30′36″S 138°22′03″E	
YMSF	MTD	Mount Sanford Station Airport	Mount Sanford, Northern Territory	16°58′42″S 130°33′18″E	
YMSK		Mount Skinner Airstrip	Anmatjere, Northern Territory	22°11′16″S 134°10′18″E	
YMSN		Mouroubra Station Airstrip	Mouroubra, Western Australia	29°48′07″S 117°42′32″E	
YMSO		Mount Sandon Airstrip	Niangala, New South Wales	31°23′24″S 151°24′36″E	Closed
YMSP		Mount Surprise Airstrip	Mount Surprise, Queensland	18°07′54″S 144°17′17″E	
YMSR		Mount Sircom Airstrip	Georgetown, Queensland	18°27′00″S 143°18′00″E	Coordinates unverified
YMSS		Murchison Shire Airstrip	Murchison, Western Australia	26°53′25″S 115°57′39″E	
YMST		Millstream Station Aerodrome	Fortescue, Western Australia	21°37′26″S 117°04′53″E	
YMSW		Mount Stewart Airstrip	Nanutarra, Western Australia	22°26′50″S 116°02′34″E	
YMSX		Mooroongga Island Airstrip	Mooroongga Island, East Arnhem, Northern Territory	11°55′59″S 135°05′15″E	
YMSY		Maatsuyker Heliport	Maatsuyker Island, Tasmania	43°39′12″S 146°16′33″E	
YMTA		Mittebah Aerodrome	Nicholson, Northern Territory	18°48′33″S 137°04′53″E	
YMTB	UTB	Muttaburra Airport	Muttaburra, Queensland	22°34′59″S 144°31′43″E	
YMTC		Mount Clarence Aerodrome	Mount Clarence Station, South Australia	28°49′37″S 134°21′08″E	
YMTD		Mount Dianne Airstrip	Lakeland, Queensland	16°03′30″S 144°30′38″E	
YMTF		The Margaret River Truffle Farm Heliport	Cowaramup, Western Australia	33°49′53″S 115°06′54″E	
YMTG	MGB	Mount Gambier Airport	Mount Gambier, South Australia	37°44′44″S 140°47′07″E	
YMTI	ONG	Mornington Island Airport	Mornington Island, Queensland	16°39′41″S 139°10′10″E	
YMTJ		Montejinni Airstrip	Victoria River, Northern Territory	16°38′43″S 131°45′29″E	
YMTM		Mata Mata Airstrip	East Arnhem, Northern Territory	12°04′38″S 136°16′11″E	
YMTN		Moura North Airstrip	Moura, Queensland	24°31′17″S 150°00′39″E	
YMTO	MNQ	Monto Airport	Monto, Queensland	24°53′32″S 151°06′07″E	
YMTP		Mount Hope Airstrip	Mount Hope, South Australia	34°08′12″S 135°20′17″E	Coordinates unverified
YMTS		Mount Short Aerodrome	Ravensthorpe, Western Australia	33°32′21″S 119°56′59″E	Formerly YRAV
YMTU		Tungamah Station Airstrip	Moonie, Queensland	27°37′41″S 150°29′32″E	
YMTW		Martins Well Aerodrome	Martins Well, South Australia	31°28′25″S 139°06′40″E	
YMTX		Mount Dare Airstrip	Witjira National Park, South Australia	26°03′42″S 135°14′49″E	
YMTZ		Mount Elizabeth Airstrip	Gibb, Western Australia	16°24′02″S 126°06′58″E	
YMUA		Monduran Airstrip	Monduran, Queensland	24°52′54″S 151°54′52″E	
YMUB		Manumbar Airstrip	Upper Kandanga, Queensland	26°26′28″S 152°28′28″E	
YMUC	MUQ	Muccan Station Airport	Muccan Station, Western Australia	20°39′32″S 120°04′00″E	
YMUD		Maude Creek Airstrip	Lansdowne, Northern Territory	14°23′30″S 132°23′39″E	Formerly YKHG
YMUE		Mount Borradale Airport	Gunbalanya, Northern Territory	12°05′52″S 132°53′19″E	
YMUG	MNE	Mungeranie Airport	Mungeranie, South Australia	28°00′33″S 138°39′25″E	
YMUH		Muthmamal Airstrip	East Arnhem, Northern Territory	12°09′37″S 136°10′29″E	
YMUJ		Munjina Airstrip	Mulga Downs Station, Western Australia	22°21′53″S 118°40′55″E	
YMUK	MVK	Mulka Airport	Mulka, South Australia	28°20′52″S 138°39′00″E	
YMUL		Murray Field Airport	Mandurah, Western Australia	32°30′37″S 115°50′00″E	
YMUM		Mumeka Airstrip	West Arnhem, Northern Territory	12°21′34″S 134°08′26″E	
YMUM		Mount Catt Airstrip	Flying Fox, Northern Territory	13°48′20″S 134°25′56″E	
YMUP	MUP	Mulga Park Airport	Mulga Park, Northern Territory	25°51′36″S 131°39′00″E	
YMUR		Bob Whittle Murwillumbah Airfield	South Murwillumbah, New South Wales	28°19′52″S 153°24′49″E	
YMUS		Mantuan Downs Airstrip	Mantuan Downs, Queensland	24°24′38″S 147°14′44″E	
YMUX		Mileura Aerodrome	East Murchison, Western Australia	26°22′04″S 117°20′14″E	
YMUY		Muckaty Airstrip	Pamayu, Northern Territory	18°38′05″S 133°55′49″E	
YMUZ		Mount Mulligan Lodge Heliport	Thornborough, Queensland	16°51′52″S 144°52′44″E	
YMVG	MKV	Mount Cavenagh Airport	Mount Cavenagh, Northern Territory	25°58′03″S 133°12′30″E	
YMVH		Marvel Loch Airstrip	Ghouli, Western Australia	31°27′57″S 119°31′51″E	
YMVM		Mangrove Mountain Airport	Mangrove Mountain, New South Wales	33°17′06″S 151°12′46″E	
YMVN		Morven Airstrip	Morven, Queensland	26°23′56″S 147°07′30″E	
YMVR		Mount Vernon Station Aerodrome	Angelo River, Western Australia	24°13′28″S 118°15′06″E	
YMVT		Montara Venture FPSO Heliport	Timor Sea, offshore Western Australia	12°39′35″S 124°32′34″E	
YMVY		Mount Valley Airstrip	Flying Fox, Northern Territory	14°05′00″S 133°48′53″E	
YMWA	MXU	Mullewa Airport	Mullewa, Western Australia	28°28′26″S 115°31′04″E	
YMWC		Mount Wickham Homestead Airfield	Mount Wyatt, Queensland	20°27′47″S 147°28′51″E	
YMWD		Holmwood Airstrip	Flying Fox, Northern Territory	36°59′33″S 140°15′04″E	
YMWE		Mount Wedge Airfield	Lake Mackay, Northern Territory	22°44′21″S 132°09′13″E	
YMWH		Montara Sea Heliport	Timor Sea, offshore Western Australia	12°40′20″S 124°32′22″E	
YMWM		Mount William Heliport	Pomonal, Victoria	37°17′42″S 142°36′12″E	
YMWN		Meteor Downs Airstrip	Albinia, Queensland	24°22′59″S 148°19′34″E	
YMWO		Mahanewo Aerodrome	Mahanewo, South Australia	31°43′03″S 136°25′43″E	
YMWR		Mundaring Weir Airstrip	Sawyers Valley, Western Australia	31°57′30″S 116°11′16″E	
YMWT	MWT	Moolawatana Airport	Moolawatana Station, South Australia	29°54′25″S 139°45′54″E	
YMWX	MXD	Marion Downs Airport	Marion Downs Station, Queensland	23°21′49″S 139°38′59″E	
YMXC		Mark Posa Memorial Airfield	Melville Island, Tiwi Islands, Northern Territory	11°33′05″S 130°35′05″E	
YMYA		Malnyanganak Airstrip	East Arnhem, Northern Territory	12°39′46″S 134°46′38″E	
YMYB	MBH	Maryborough Airport	Maryborough, Queensland	25°30′46″S 152°42′49″E	
YMYH		Mallapunyah Springs Airstrip	Creswell, Northern Territory	16°57′58″S 135°46′44″E	
YMYI		Marymia Airstrip	Kumarina, Western Australia	25°06′06″S 119°45′46″E	
YMWP		Mayawunpirri Airstrip	Burgunngura Island, Northern Territory	11°35′42″S 136°04′55″E	
YMYR	MYO	Myroodah Airport	Myroodah, Western Australia	18°07′26″S 124°16′15″E	
YMYT	RTY	Merty Merty Airport	Merty Merty, South Australia	28°34′58″S 140°18′12″E	
YMYU		Myrup Fly-in Estate Aerodrome	Myrup, Western Australia	33°47′21″S 121°57′25″E	
YMYV		Maryvale Airstrip	Hugh, Northern Territory	24°38′53″S 134°01′35″E	
YMYW		Murray Downs Airstrip	Davenport, Northern Territory	21°02′54″S 134°41′14″E	
YMYY		Mary Valley Airstrip	Laura, Queensland	15°02′50″S 143°45′28″E	
YMZI		Menzies Aerodrome	Menzies, Western Australia	29°41′09″S 121°01′40″E	

== YN ==
ICAO	IATA	Airport name	Community	Coordinates	Notes
YNAA	NBH	Nambucca Heads Airport	Nambucca Heads, New South Wales	30°40′34″S 152°58′57″E	Formerly YNHS
YNAB		Nabarlek Airport	West Arnhem, Northern Territory	12°18′21″S 133°18′42″E	
YNAL		Naliyindi Airstrip	East Arnhem, Northern Territory	12°32′26″S 135°10′37″E	
YNAM		Namurgadubu Airstrip	West Arnhem, Northern Territory	12°09′50″S 134°01′17″E	
YNAN		Nanango Airstrip	Nanango, Queensland	26°41′19″S 151°59′22″E	
YNAP	NMR	Nappa Merrie Airport	Nappa Merrie, Queensland	27°33′00″S 141°09′33″E	
YNAR	NRA	Narrandera Airport	Narrandera, New South Wales	34°42′08″S 146°30′44″E	
YNAT		Nathan River Station Airstrip	Limmen, Northern Territory	15°35′13″S 135°25′48″E	
YNAU		Nannup Aerodrome	Carlotta, Western Australia	34°01′49″S 115°44′13″E	
YNBA		Nubeena Heliport	Nubeena, Tasmania	43°05′58″S 147°44′42″E	
YNBH		Noonbah Airstrip	Longreach, Queensland	24°05′45″S 143°09′41″E	
YNBO		Nebo Airstrip	Nebo, Queensland	21°42′08″S 148°41′40″E	
YNBR	NAA	Narrabri Airport	Narrabri, New South Wales	30°19′09″S 149°49′38″E	
YNBS		North Bundy Station Aerodrome	Booroorban, New South Wales	34°53′49″S 144°27′46″E	
YNBY		Knocker Bay Seaplane Base	Cobourg, Northern Territory	11°19′09″S 132°07′15″E	
YNCD		Noccundra Airstrip	Noccundra, Queensland	27°48′36″S 142°35′37″E	
YNCS		New Crown Airstrip	Ghan, Northern Territory	25°40′48″S 134°50′19″E	
YNCW		Newcastle Waters Airstrip	Pamayu, Northern Territory	17°20′06″S 133°26′23″E	
YNDG		Newdegate Aerodrome	Newdegate, Western Australia	33°06′15″S 119°01′05″E	
YNDR		Nundroo Aerodrome	Coorabie, South Australia	31°46′49″S 132°13′24″E	
YNDS		Natal Downs Airstrip	Llanarth, Queensland	21°05′26″S 146°09′09″E	
YNDT		Indet Heliport	Balnagowan, Queensland	21°05′35″S 148°59′52″E	
YNDW		Nandowrie Airstrip	Lochington, Queensland	24°13′44″S 147°36′54″E	
YNEE		Nee Nee Airstrip	Moree, New South Wales	29°07′00″S 150°01′00″E	Coordinates unverified
YNEN		Northern Endeavour Heliport	Timor Sea, offshore Western Australia	10°37′24″S 126°02′00″E	
YNEP		Nepean Aerospace Park Heliport	Castlereagh, New South Wales	33°43′39″S 150°41′00″E	
YNER		Nerrima Airstrip	St George Ranges, Western Australia	18°30′18″S 124°23′50″E	
YNES		Nelson Springs Airstrip	Buchanan, Northern Territory	17°17′57″S 129°16′30″E	
YNET		Netley Station Aerodrome	Broken Hill, New South Wales	32°35′06″S 141°27′06″E	
YNEW		Newlands Coal Airstrip	Newlands, Queensland	21°10′18″S 147°54′32″E	
YNEY		Nelly Bay Helipad	Magnetic Island, Queensland	19°09′43″S 146°51′14″E	
YNGA		Wangaratta Heliport	Wangaratta, Victoria	36°21′28″S 146°18′38″E	
YNGB		Nagambie Airstrip	Bailieston, Victoria	36°44′18″S 145°07′30″E	
YNGM		Windibri Heliport	Nangram, Queensland	26°52′32″S 150°18′40″E	
YNGT		Ngangoriordt Airstrip	West Arnhem, Northern Territory	12°33′53″S 134°16′22″E	
YNGU	RPM	Ngukurr Airport	Roper River, Northern Territory	14°43′22″S 134°44′51″E	
YNGV		Ningaloo Vision FPSO Heliport	Offshore Western Australia	21°24′06″S 114°05′12″E	
YNGW		Nagambie-Wirrate Airport	Nagambie, Victoria	36°47′02″S 145°02′13″E	
YNHE		Newhaven Airstrip	Newhaven, Victoria	38°31′29″S 145°19′39″E	Closed
YNHL		Nhill Airport	Nhill, Victoria	36°18′35″S 141°38′27″E	
YNHM		Northam Army Camp Airstrip	Burlong, Western Australia	31°40′40″S 116°37′08″E	
YNHP		Northampton Airstrip	East Bowes, Western Australia	28°20′31″S 114°43′01″E	
YNHV		New Haven Airstrip	Lake Mackay, Northern Territory	22°43′41″S 131°08′50″E	
YNIC		Nicholson Airstrip	Ord River, Western Australia	18°03′09″S 128°54′21″E	
YNIG		Nonning Aerodrome	Nonning, South Australia	32°31′34″S 136°29′41″E	
YNJY		Ngujima-Yin FPSO Heliport	Offshore Western Australia	21°25′55″S 114°04′12″E	
YNKA		Noonkanbah Airstrip	Mount Hardman, Western Australia	18°29′41″S 124°51′07″E	
YNKG		North Kanangra Heliport	High Range, New South Wales	34°21′47″S 150°20′16″E	Closed
YNKH		Numurkah Heliport	Numurkah, Victoria	36°05′35″S 145°25′59″E	
YNKR		Nackeroo Airstrip	Bradshaw Field Training Area, Bradshaw, Northern Territory	15°34′36″S 130°28′30″E	Military
YNLD		Nildottie Airstrip	Nildottie, South Australia	34°41′04″S 139°40′23″E	
YNLH		New Landsdown Homestead	Mueller Ranges, Western Australia	17°36′47″S 126°44′34″E	
YNMN		New Moon Airstrip	Basalt, Queensland	19°12′00″S 145°46′23″E	
YNMY		New May Downs Homestead Airstrip	Mount Isa, Queensland	20°35′20″S 139°20′20″E	
YNNG		Nar Nar Goon Airport	Nar Nar Goon, Victoria	38°04′03″S 145°34′32″E	
YNNM		Noonamah Airstrip	Wanaaring, New South Wales	30°10′13″S 143°53′54″E	
YNNR		Nerrin Nerrin Aerodrome	Nerrin Nerrin, Victoria	37°46′46″S 143°01′29″E	
YNNT		Nantarra Airstrip	Nanutarra, Western Australia	22°32′14″S 115°29′33″E	
YNOB		Nobbys Creek Airstrip	Nobbys Creek, New South Wales	28°17′45″S 153°19′35″E	
YNOC		Nockatunga Airstrip	Noccundra, Queensland	27°43′10″S 142°42′28″E	
YNOF		Norfolk Airstrip	Lawn Hill, Queensland	19°19′19″S 138°20′03″E	
YNOI		North Island Seaplane Base	Pellew Islands, Northern Territory	15°32′11″S 136°51′08″E	
YNOM		Norman Reef Seaplane Base	Coral Sea Islands	16°25′30″S 145°59′27″E	
YNON		Noondoonia Homestead Airstrip	Balladonia, Western Australia	32°17′00″S 123°40′01″E	Coordinates unverified
YNOO		Nooyeah Downs Aerodrome	Thargomindah, Queensland	28°02′33″S 143°33′32″E	
YNOR		Norwood Aerodrome	Maude, New South Wales	34°14′56″S 144°21′07″E	
YNOS		North Star Heliport	North Star, New South Wales	28°55′52″S 150°23′41″E	
YNOV		Nova Airstrip	Fraser Range Station, Western Australia	31°50′43″S 123°11′31″E	
YNPA		Nilpinna Aerodrome	Nilpinna Station, South Australia	28°28′56″S 135°54′45″E	
YNPB		Napperby Airstrip	Anmatjere, Northern Territory	22°31′52″S 132°45′48″E	
YNPD		Napier Downs Airstrip	Wunaamin Miliwundi Ranges, Western Australia	17°19′09″S 124°49′18″E	
YNPE	ABM	Northern Peninsula Airport	Bamaga, Queensland	10°57′03″S 142°27′34″E	
YNPJ		Pinjarra North Airstrip	Ravenswood, Western Australia	32°34′49″S 115°53′06″E	
YNPU		Nepabunna Airstrip	Angepena, South Australia	30°35′54″S 138°53′56″E	
YNQI		New Quinambie Airstrip	Quinyambie, South Australia	30°54′03″S 140°57′18″E	
YNRB		Narembeen Aerodrome	South Kumminin, Western Australia	32°06′35″S 118°24′18″E	
YNRC	NAC	Naracoorte Airport	Naracoorte, South Australia	36°59′06″S 140°43′05″E	
YNRG	NRG	Narrogin Airport	Narrogin, Western Australia	32°55′48″S 117°04′48″E	
YNRH		Newcastle Regional Heliport	Mayfield West, New South Wales	32°52′45″S 151°43′41″E	
YNRL		Naryilco Aerodrome	Cameron Corner, Queensland	28°33′02″S 141°55′11″E	
YNRM		Narromine Airport	Narromine, New South Wales	32°12′52″S 148°13′29″E	
YNRN		Narayen Airstrip	Cheltenham, Queensland	25°40′53″S 150°51′32″E	
YNRR		Nyrripi Airstrip	Nyirripi, Northern Territory	22°38′37″S 130°34′20″E	
YNRV	RVT	Ravensthorpe Airport	Ravensthorpe, Western Australia	33°47′50″S 120°12′29″E	
YNSH	NSV	Noosa Airport	Noosaville, Queensland	26°25′24″S 153°03′55″E	
YNSI		North Solitary Island Heliport	North Solitary Island, New South Wales	29°55′29″S 153°23′23″E	
YNSM	NSM	Norseman Airport	Norseman, Western Australia	32°12′34″S 121°45′16″E	
YNTH		Normanton Heliport	Normanton, Queensland	17°40′41″S 141°04′05″E	
YNTI		Abrolhos North Island Airstrip	North Island, Western Australia	28°17′59″S 113°35′45″E	
YNTJ		Neutral Junction Airstrip	Davenport, Northern Territory	21°31′10″S 133°59′22″E	
YNTL		Newcastle Harbour Seaplane Base	Newcastle, New South Wales	32°55′21″S 151°46′53″E	
YNTM		Northam Airstrip	Northam, Western Australia	31°37′33″S 116°41′04″E	
YNTN	NTN	Normanton Airport	Normanton, Queensland	17°41′06″S 141°04′12″E	
YNUB	NUR	Nullarbor Motel Airport	Nullarbor, South Australia	31°26′28″S 130°54′08″E	
YNUD		Nammuldi Mine Airstrip	Mount Sheila, Western Australia	22°23′31″S 117°22′34″E	Closed
YNUE		Numery Airstrip	Hale, Northern Territory	23°59′55″S 135°25′19″E	
YNUJ		Nudjaburra Airstrip	Nicholson, Northern Territory	17°58′13″S 137°58′04″E	
YNUL	NLL	Nullagine Airport	Nullagine, Western Australia	21°54′42″S 120°11′54″E	
YNUM	NUB	Numbulwar Airport	Numbulwar, Northern Territory	14°16′18″S 135°43′00″E	
YNUN		Nuntherungie Aerodrome	Mutawintji, New South Wales	30°48′31″S 142°29′15″E	
YNUR		Nurruwyn Property Airstrip	Wee Waa, New South Wales	30°17′39″S 149°29′37″E	
YNUT		Nutwood Downs Airstrip	Arnold, Northern Territory	15°48′27″S 134°08′45″E	
YNVD		New Victoria Downs Airstrip	Campaspe, Queensland	20°36′24″S 146°18′29″E	
YNVE		Navarre Airfield	Navarre, Victoria	36°55′15″S 143°05′28″E	
YNVL		Normanville Airstrip	Normanville, Victoria	35°47′00″S 143°42′00″E	Coordinates unverified
YNVR		Navarra Aerodrome	Isisford, Queensland	24°51′15″S 143°40′10″E	
YNWL		North Well Aerodrome	Wilgena Station, South Australia	30°50′22″S 135°17′52″E	
YNWM		Neumayer Valley Station Airstrip	Stokes, Queensland	18°28′25″S 140°13′31″E	
YNWN	ZNE	Newman Airport	Newman, Western Australia	23°25′04″S 119°48′10″E	
YNWT		Narwietooma Airstrip	Mount Zeil, Northern Territory	23°13′44″S 132°37′46″E	
YNWY		Netherway Aerodrome	Conimbia, New South Wales	30°41′11″S 148°07′47″E	
YNYG		Nyang Airstrip	Yannarie, Western Australia	23°02′11″S 115°02′51″E	
YNYM		Nymagee Aerodrome	Nymagee, New South Wales	32°03′14″S 146°18′44″E	
YNYN	NYN	Nyngan Airport	Nyngan, New South Wales	31°33′06″S 147°12′12″E	
YNYP		Nyapari Airstrip	Nyapari, South Australia	26°11′17″S 130°11′32″E	

== YO ==
ICAO	IATA	Airport name	Community	Coordinates	Notes
YOAD		Old Andado Airstrip	Ghan, Northern Territory	25°22′34″S 135°25′32″E	
YOAF		Old Arafura Airstrip	East Arnhem, Northern Territory	12°28′29″S 134°57′31″E	
YOAK		Oakville Airstrip	Narrabri, New South Wales	30°15′45″S 149°46′10″E	
YOAM		Oakhampton Airstrip	Upper Manilla, New South Wales	30°34′29″S 150°39′41″E	
YOAP		One Arm Point Airstrip	Dampier Peninsula, Western Australia	16°26′44″S 123°04′06″E	
YOAR		Monarto Safari Park Heliport	Monarto, South Australia	35°05′12″S 139°09′34″E	
YOAS		The Oaks Airfield	The Oaks, New South Wales	34°05′02″S 150°33′36″E	
YOAY		Oaky Creek Airstrip	Lilyvale, Central Highlands Region, Queensland	23°03′25″S 148°29′45″E	
YOBA		Old Brisbane Heliport	Eagle Farm, Queensland	27°25′31″S 153°04′50″E	Closed
YOBE		Oberon Heliport	Oberon, New South Wales	33°42′03″S 149°51′22″E	
YOBM		Oombabeer Airstrip	Oombabeer, Queensland	24°31′44″S 149°33′21″E	
YOBN		Oban Airstrip	Waverley, Queensland	21°14′05″S 139°02′00″E	
YOBR		Old Bar Heritage Airstrip	Old Bar, New South Wales	31°57′55″S 152°35′28″E	
YOCA		Ochre Arch Airstrip	Pinnacle, New South Wales	33°45′21″S 148°00′46″E	
YOCC		Oaky Creek Coal Mine Airstrip	Lilyvale, Central Highlands Region, Queensland	23°03′23″S 148°29′44″E	
YOCG		Ocean Grove Heliport	Ocean Grove, Victoria	38°16′20″S 144°33′34″E	
YOCR		Orchid Creek Airstrip	Archer River, Queensland	13°12′23″S 143°01′52″E	Closed
YODA		Ooldea Airstrip	Maralinga Tjarutja, South Australia	30°27′24″S 131°49′23″E	
YODL		Ourdel Aerodrome	Windorah, Queensland	25°21′49″S 142°38′46″E	
YOEH		Orange East Heliport	Orange, New South Wales	33°19′01″S 149°08′55″E	
YOEN	OPI	Oenpelli Airport	Gunbalanya, Northern Territory	12°19′30″S 133°00′18″E	
YOGD		Olga Downs Airstrip	Burleigh, Queensland	20°24′30″S 143°11′15″E	
YOIT		Orielton Airstrip	Corfield, Queensland	22°03′46″S 144°08′21″E	
YOKA		Okha FPSO Heliport	Offshore Western Australia	19°35′30″S 116°26′06″E	
YOKE		Oakvale Airstrip	Aramac, Queensland	22°17′56″S 145°59′01″E	
YOKH		Oakden Hills Airstrip	Oakden Hills, South Australia	31°39′58″S 137°02′10″E	
YOKV		Oak Valley Airstrip	Oak Valley, South Australia	29°30′23″S 130°52′09″E	
YOLA	XCO	Colac Airport	Colac, Victoria	38°17′11″S 143°40′47″E	
YOLD	OLP	Olympic Dam Airport	Olympic Dam mine, South Australia	30°29′06″S 136°52′36″E	
YOLL		Yolla Platform Heliport	Bass Strait, offshore Tasmania	39°50′42″S 145°49′06″E	
YOLO		Yolandra Airstrip	Biniguy, New South Wales	29°37′42″S 150°11′40″E	
YOLW	ONS	Onslow Airport	Onslow, Western Australia	21°40′06″S 115°06′47″E	
YOLY		Oxley Station Airstrip	Oxley, New South Wales	31°00′48″S 147°42′40″E	
YOMI		Omicron Station Aerodrome	Cameron Corner, Queensland	28°45′38″S 141°12′32″E	
YOMO		Omeo Airstrip	Omeo, Victoria	37°06′24″S 147°36′24″E	
YONE		Balonne Airstrip	Barcaldine, Queensland	23°18′04″S 145°00′54″E	
YOOD	ODD	Oodnadatta Airport	Oodnadatta, South Australia	27°33′36″S 135°26′42″E	
YOOK		Cook Aerodrome	Nullarbor, South Australia	30°37′07″S 130°24′22″E	
YOOM	MOO	Moomba Airport	Moomba, South Australia	28°06′00″S 140°11′48″E	
YOOO		Mooloola Homestead Airstrip	Victoria River, Northern Territory	16°19′58″S 131°30′03″E	
YOPC		Opium Creek Airstrip	Point Stuart, Northern Territory	12°34′46″S 131°43′47″E	
YOPH		Orpheus Island Seaplane Base	Orpheus Island National Park, Queensland	18°37′59″S 146°29′40″E	
YOPK		Orana Park Airstrip	Rhydding, Queensland	24°48′50″S 149°26′23″E	
YOPY		Osprey Reef Seaplane Base	Coral Sea Islands	13°55′00″S 146°37′01″E	
YORA		Moonerah Aerodrome	Cocklebiddy, Western Australia	31°41′29″S 126°35′26″E	
YORB	RBS	Orbost Airport	Orbost, Victoria	37°47′24″S 148°36′36″E	
YORC	OKB	Orchid Beach Airport	Orchid Beach, Queensland	24°57′34″S 153°18′54″E	
YORG	OAG	Orange Airport	Orange, New South Wales	33°22′54″S 149°07′59″E	
YORL		Orleans Farm Airstrip	Boyatup, Western Australia	33°47′36″S 122°56′51″E	
YORO		Moroak Airstrip	Flying Fox, Northern Territory	14°49′05″S 133°42′01″E	
YORP		Oraparinna Airstrip	Flinders Ranges, South Australia	31°26′19″S 138°43′55″E	
YORR		Orroroo Airstrip	Orroroo, South Australia	32°47′27″S 138°40′19″E	
YORS		Orbost Heliport	Orbost, Victoria	37°42′41″S 148°27′17″E	
YORT		Ooratippra Airstrip	Sandover, Northern Territory	21°54′26″S 136°04′32″E	
YORU		Orungal Airstrip	Brush Creek, Queensland	28°37′06″S 151°07′21″E	
YORV	ODR	Ord River Airport	Ord River, Western Australia	17°20′27″S 128°54′42″E	
YORW		Orient Well Airstrip	Kookynie, Western Australia	29°11′57″S 121°26′17″E	
YOSB	OSO	Osborne Mine Airport	Selwyn, Queensland	22°04′54″S 140°33′24″E	
YOSI		Osborne Island Seaplane Base	Middle Osborn Island, Western Australia	14°20′18″S 126°02′12″E	
YOSN		Old Station Airstrip	Raglan, Queensland	23°49′03″S 150°49′04″E	
YOTN		Ootann Airstrip	Almaden, Queensland	17°26′34″S 144°38′48″E	
YOUN		Youanmi Airstrip	Youanmi Gold Mine, Western Australia	28°36′53″S 118°50′58″E	
YOUY	OYN	Ouyen Airport	Ouyen, Victoria	35°05′20″S 142°21′17″E	
YOXL		Oxley Police Academy Heliport	Oxley, Queensland	27°34′09″S 152°58′31″E	
YOYS		Oyster Reef Seaplane Base	Coral Sea Islands	16°37′59″S 145°56′00″E	

== YP ==
ICAO	IATA	Airport name	Community	Coordinates	Notes
YPAC		Pacific Haven Airstrip	Pacific Haven, Queensland	25°14′25″S 152°32′36″E	
YPAD	ADL	Adelaide Airport	Adelaide, South Australia	34°56′42″S 138°31′50″E	
YPAE		Paradise Palms Heliport	Kewarra Beach, Queensland	16°47′09″S 145°39′55″E	
YPAG	PUG	Port Augusta Airport	Port Augusta, South Australia	32°30′25″S 137°43′00″E	
YPAJ		Pajinka Seaplane Base	Somerset, Queensland	10°42′17″S 142°32′21″E	
YPAK		Upaykal Airstrip	Coen, Queensland	14°04′43″S 143°37′59″E	
YPAL		Palmer River Airstrip	Lakeland, Queensland	16°06′23″S 144°46′26″E	
YPAM	PMK	Palm Island Airport	Palm Island, Queensland	18°45′19″S 146°34′53″E	
YPAN		Palumpa Airstrip	Alton Downs, Queensland	23°19′18″S 150°21′48″E	
YPAR		Port Arthur Heliport	Port Arthur, Tasmania	43°06′16″S 147°51′33″E	
YPAS		Packsaddle Aerodrome	Packsaddle, New South Wales	30°17′39″S 142°08′15″E	
YPAU		St Pauls Seaplane Base	Moa Island, Queensland	10°11′31″S 142°20′19″E	
YPAW		Paradise Waters Seaplane Base	Southport / Surfers Paradise, Queensland	27°58′54″S 153°25′05″E	
YPAY		Papunya Airstrip	Kunparrka, Northern Territory	23°14′28″S 131°54′25″E	
YPBH		Peterborough Airport	Peterborough, Victoria	38°36′24″S 142°54′22″E	
YPBM		Port Bremmer Seaplane Base	Cobourg, Northern Territory	11°13′26″S 132°16′03″E	
YPBN		Port Broughton Heliport	Port Broughton, South Australia	33°35′55″S 137°56′05″E	
YPBO	PBO	Paraburdoo Airport	Paraburdoo, Western Australia	23°10′17″S 117°44′44″E	
YPBY		Palm Bay Seaplane Base	Long Island, Whitsunday Islands, Queensland	20°20′37″S 148°50′47″E	
YPCC	CCK	Cocos (Keeling) Islands Airport	Cocos (Keeling) Islands	12°11′19″S 096°49′50″E	
YPCE		Pooncarie Airport	Pooncarie, New South Wales	33°22′24″S 142°35′00″E	
YPCH		Patchewollock Airstrip	Patchewollock, Victoria	35°22′12″S 142°11′38″E	
YPCM		Pickertaramoor Airstrip	Tiwi Islands, Northern Territory	11°45′44″S 130°52′51″E	
YPCS		Pinnacles Homestead Aerodrome	Leinster, Western Australia	28°11′50″S 120°26′10″E	
YPDA		Parndana Airstrip	Seddon, South Australia	35°48′25″S 137°15′50″E	
YPDD		Port David Airstrip	Croker Island, Northern Territory	11°20′37″S 132°35′22″E	
YPDE		Pendeen Airstrip	Rudall, South Australia	33°39′39″S 136°08′29″E	
YPDF		Paddys Flat Airstrip	Boro, New South Wales	35°12′25″S 149°40′14″E	
YPDI	PDE	Pandie Pandie Airport	Pandie Pandie, South Australia	26°07′20″S 139°24′13″E	
YPDK		Perry's Paddock Heliport	Woodvale, Western Australia	31°46′44″S 115°47′58″E	
YPDN	DRW	Darwin International Airport / RAAF Darwin	Darwin, Northern Territory	12°24′53″S 130°52′36″E	Joint use
YPDO	PRD	Pardoo Station Airport	Pardoo Station, Western Australia	20°07′10″S 119°34′20″E	
YPDS		Planet Downs Airstrip	Humboldt, Queensland	24°32′20″S 148°53′40″E	
YPDY		Padthaway Station Airstrip	Padthaway, South Australia	36°37′00″S 140°28′59″E	Closed
YPEA		RAAF Pearce	Bullsbrook, Western Australia	32°05′51″S 115°52′52″E	
YPED		RAAF Edinburgh	Salisbury, South Australia	34°42′09″S 138°37′15″E	
YPEF		Sunbury (Penfield) Aerodrome	Sunbury, Victoria	37°30′42″S 144°42′01″E	
YPEN		Penny Airstrip	Sandstone, Western Australia	28°49′42″S 118°49′48″E	
YPEP	PEP	Peppimenarti Airstrip	Peppimenarti, Northern Territory	14°08′39″S 130°05′28″E	
YPER		Braidwood/Percheron Aerodrome	Durran Durra, New South Wales	35°20′37″S 149°54′59″E	
YPET		Petro Station Airstrip	Arumpo, New South Wales	33°50′00″S 142°39′06″E	
YPFA		Port Fairy Airstrip	Port Fairy, Victoria	38°21′43″S 142°15′52″E	
YPFL		Preston Field Airstrip	Myalup, Western Australia	33°01′12″S 115°42′06″E	
YPFT		Cooma–Polo Flat Airport	Cooma, New South Wales	36°13′48″S 149°09′00″E	
YPGH		Pigeon Hole Airstrip	Victoria River, Northern Territory	16°49′14″S 131°12′20″E	
YPGP		Paraburdoo Gold Project Airstrip	Angelo River, Western Australia	23°24′07″S 117°53′04″E	
YPGV	GOV	Gove Airport	Nhulunbuy, Northern Territory	12°16′09″S 136°49′06″E	
YPHP		Port Campbell Heliport	Port Campbell, Victoria	38°37′44″S 143°02′26″E	
YPHS		Pine Hill Station Airstrip	Anmatjere, Northern Territory	22°23′13″S 133°03′37″E	
YPHU		Port Hurd Airstrip	Tiwi Islands, Northern Territory	11°41′28″S 130°11′52″E	
YPIC		Piccaninny Airstrip	Hervey Range, Queensland	19°37′00″S 146°31′50″E	Closed
YPID		Phillip Island Heliport	Phillip Island, Victoria	38°31′24″S 145°19′36″E	
YPIN		Pinnacle Airstrip	Dixie, Queensland	15°41′27″S 143°33′54″E	
YPIP		Piper's Field Airstrip	Eglinton, New South Wales	33°22′39″S 149°31′11″E	
YPIR	PPI	Port Pirie Airport	Port Pirie, South Australia	33°14′20″S 137°59′42″E	
YPIX		Pia Aerodrome	South Murchison, Western Australia	27°11′20″S 116°16′57″E	
YPIY		Pingelly Airstrip	West Pingelly, Western Australia	32°32′24″S 117°04′23″E	Closed
YPJI		Perenjori Aerodrome	Perenjori, Western Australia	29°25′35″S 116°17′02″E	
YPJN		Pantijan Airstrip	Prince Regent River, Western Australia	15°57′56″S 125°03′07″E	
YPJT	JAD	Jandakot Airport	Jandakot, Western Australia	32°05′51″S 115°52′52″E	
YPKA	KTA	Karratha Airport	Karratha, Western Australia	20°42′44″S 116°46′24″E	
YPKE		Peake Airstrip	Anna Creek Station, South Australia	28°14′27″S 135°53′38″E	
YPKG	KGI	Kalgoorlie-Boulder Airport	Kalgoorlie, Western Australia	30°47′22″S 121°27′42″E	
YPKH		Peak Hill Airstrip	Peak Hill, New South Wales	32°43′52″S 148°12′40″E	
YPKI		Parakylia Aerodrome	Parakylia, South Australia	30°23′50″S 136°23′48″E	Military
YPKL		Puckapunyal Air Base	Puckapunyal, Victoria	36°59′53″S 145°03′51″E	
YPKS	PKE	Parkes Airport	Parkes, New South Wales	33°07′52″S 148°14′28″E	
YPKT	PKT	Port Keats Airfield	Port Keats, Northern Territory	14°14′54″S 129°31′42″E	
YPKU	KNX	East Kimberley Regional Airport	Kununurra, Western Australia	15°46′41″S 128°42′27″E	
YPLA		Pluto Alpha Heliport	Offshore Western Australia	19°59′46″S 115°22′07″E	
YPLB		Palm Beach Seaplane Base	Palm Beach, New South Wales	33°36′19″S 151°19′03″E	
YPLC	PLO	Port Lincoln Airport	Port Lincoln, South Australia	34°36′19″S 135°52′49″E	
YPLG		Pilliga Airstrip	Pilliga, New South Wales	30°22′00″S 148°52′59″E	
YPLI		Palmers Island/Yamba Airstrip	Palmers Island, New South Wales	29°26′45″S 153°16′14″E	
YPLL		Peak Hill Airstrip	Peak Hill, Western Australia	25°36′41″S 118°41′48″E	
YPLM	LEA	Learmonth Airport / RAAF Base Learmonth	Exmouth, Western Australia	22°14′09″S 114°05′19″E	Joint use
YPLP		Langley Park Airstrip	Langley Park, Western Australia	31°57′41″S 115°52′07″E	Closed
YPLS		Gladstone/PlayStation Airstrip	Old Station, New South Wales	31°02′38″S 152°56′10″E	
YPLT		Point Lookout Heliport	Point Lookout, Queensland	27°25′36″S 153°31′20″E	
YPLU		Plutonic Airport	Plutonic Gold Mine, Western Australia	25°18′48″S 119°25′24″E	
YPMB		Plumbago Airstrip	Plumbago, South Australia	32°03′12″S 139°52′19″E	
YPME		Palmer Airstrip	Darwin River, Northern Territory	12°50′00″S 130°55′59″E	Closed
YPMH	PXH	Prominent Hill Airport	Prominent Hill mine, South Australia	29°43′00″S 135°31′18″E	
YPMP	EDR	Edward River Airport	Pormpuraaw, Queensland	14°53′48″S 141°36′34″E	
YPMQ	PQQ	Port Macquarie Airport	Port Macquarie, New South Wales	31°26′09″S 152°51′48″E	
YPMV		Palm Valley Heliport	Namatjira, Northern Territory	24°03′20″S 132°44′29″E	
YPNA		Pinnarendi Station Airstrip	Minnamoolka, Queensland	18°02′19″S 144°53′03″E	
YPNC		Pinnacles Airpark	Pinnacles, Queensland	19°26′46″S 146°42′30″E	
YPND		Pentland Airstrip	Pentland, Queensland	20°31′49″S 145°23′01″E	
YPNG		Penong Aerodrome	Penong, South Australia	31°55′21″S 133°00′04″E	
YPNI		Prenti Downs Airstrip	Lake Carnegie, Western Australia	26°31′26″S 122°48′41″E	
YPNN		Pinnaroo Airstrip	Pinnaroo, South Australia	35°15′30″S 140°56′41″E	
YPNR		Pinora Airstrip	Guyra, New South Wales	30°15′37″S 151°37′45″E	
YPNW		Pannawonica Airstrip	Pannawonica, Western Australia	21°37′43″S 116°19′10″E	
YPOA		Portia Gold Mine Airstrip	Mulyungarie, South Australia	31°25′46″S 140°25′29″E	
YPOD	PTJ	Portland Airport	Portland, Victoria	38°19′05″S 141°28′16″E	
YPOK	MBF	Porepunkah Airfield	Porepunkah, Victoria	36°43′06″S 146°53′04″E	
YPOO		Pootnoura Airstrip	Mount Willoughby, South Australia	28°28′19″S 134°11′42″E	
YPOP		Porphyry Airstrip	Kookynie, Western Australia	29°46′33″S 122°16′08″E	
YPOR		Portland Heliport	Portland, New South Wales	33°21′14″S 149°58′31″E	
YPOT		Portsmith Heliport	Portsmith, Queensland	16°56′58″S 145°45′31″E	
YPPA		Palparara Airstrip	Farrars Creek, Queensland	24°49′08″S 141°28′03″E	
YPPD	PHE	Port Hedland International Airport	Port Hedland, Western Australia	20°22′40″S 118°37′35″E	
YPPF		Parafield Airport	Salisbury, South Australia	34°47′36″S 138°37′59″E	
YPPH	PER	Perth Airport	Redcliffe, Western Australia	31°56′25″S 115°58′01″E	
YPPR		Pier Pier Airstrip	Conimbia, New South Wales	30°37′55″S 147°57′42″E	
YPPS		Piccaninny Plains Airstrip	Archer River, Queensland	13°09′13″S 142°46′36″E	
YPRA		Prairie Airstrip	Prairie, Victoria	36°18′26″S 144°08′20″E	Coordinates unverified
YPRC		The Prince Charles Hospital Heliport	Chermside, Queensland	27°23′15″S 153°01′27″E	
YPRD		Paradise Station Airstrip	Paradise, New South Wales	29°52′40″S 151°28′53″E	
YPRE		Premer Betoota Airstrip	Premer, New South Wales	31°28′37″S 149°54′11″E	
YPRI		Princess Alexandra Hospital Heliport	Woolloongabba, Queensland	27°30′01″S 153°02′01″E	
YPRS		Parsons Beach Seaplane Base	Waitpinga, South Australia	35°37′51″S 138°28′09″E	
YPRV		Pascoe River Aerodrome	Shelburne, Queensland	12°33′26″S 143°07′18″E	
YPSB		Punsand Bay Heliport	Punsand, Queensland	10°43′14″S 142°27′50″E	
YPSH	PEA	Penneshaw Airport	Penneshaw, South Australia	35°45′21″S 137°57′46″E	
YPSI		Passage Island Aerodrome	Passage Island, Tasmania	40°29′54″S 148°20′12″E	
YPSM		Point Samson Heliport	Point Samson, Western Australia	20°37′57″S 117°11′51″E	
YPSR		Perisher Valley Heliport	Perisher Valley, New South Wales	36°24′18″S 148°24′53″E	
YPTA		Portarlington Heliport	Portarlington, Victoria	38°06′50″S 144°38′40″E	
YPTB		Peterborough Airstrip	Sunnybrae, South Australia	33°00′18″S 138°50′54″E	
YPTD		Port Douglas Seaplane Base	Port Douglas, Queensland	16°28′53″S 145°27′33″E	
YPTG		Port George Seaplane Base	Prince Regent River, Western Australia	15°23′00″S 124°40′00″E	
YPTH		Penrith Aerodrome	Longreach, Queensland	23°06′22″S 143°37′05″E	
YPTJ		Patjarr Airstrip	Patjarr, Western Australia	24°37′08″S 126°19′37″E	
YPTL		Portland Downs Airstrip	Ilfracombe, Queensland	24°07′38″S 144°35′44″E	
YPTN	KTR	RAAF Base Tindal	Katherine, Northern Territory	14°31′16″S 132°22′40″E	
YPTS		Portsea Heliport	Portsea, Victoria	38°19′07″S 144°43′05″E	
YPTT		Pernatty Airstrip	Pernatty, South Australia	31°27′54″S 137°28′59″E	
YPTV		Perth TV Stations Heliport	Dianella, Western Australia	31°52′55″S 115°51′31″E	Closed
YPUA		Palumpa Airstrip	Nganmarriyanga, Northern Territory	14°20′24″S 129°51′51″E	
YPUG		Pungalina Airstrip	Calvert, Northern Territory	16°43′19″S 137°25′24″E	
YPUK		Puk Puk Airstrip	Hervey Range, Queensland	19°26′40″S 146°24′40″E	Military
YPUN		Punmu Airstrip	Telfer, Western Australia	22°03′24″S 123°09′08″E	
YPVC		Port Victoria Heliport	Port Victoria, South Australia	34°30′31″S 137°28′32″E	
YPVD		Plevna Downs Airstrip	Eromanga, Queensland	26°40′00″S 142°35′31″E	
YPVI		Palmerville Station Airstrip	Palmer, Queensland	16°00′29″S 144°04′23″E	
YPWF		Port Wakefield Airstrip	Port Wakefield, South Australia	34°11′33″S 138°09′23″E	
YPWH		Pittsworth Airstrip	Pittsworth, Queensland	27°44′01″S 151°37′56″E	
YPWL		Powelltown Heliport	Powelltown, Victoria	37°51′51″S 145°44′54″E	
YPWR	UMR	RAAF Woomera	Woomera, South Australia	31°08′39″S 136°49′01″E	
YPXM	XCH	Christmas Island Airport	Christmas Island	10°27′02″S 105°41′25″E	
YPXR		Portland Hospital Heliport	Portland, Victoria	38°20′29″S 141°36′23″E	
YPYA		Palmyra Airstrip	Palmyra, Queensland	21°12′42″S 149°04′36″E	
YPYD		Pyramid Hill Airstrip	Pyramid Hill, Victoria	36°03′38″S 144°07′36″E	
YPYF		Paynes Find Aerodrome	Paynes Find, Western Australia	29°15′43″S 117°40′08″E	
YPYV		Pyrenees Venture FPSO Heliport	Offshore Western Australia	21°32′21″S 114°06′55″E	

== YQ ==
ICAO	IATA	Airport name	Community	Coordinates	Notes
YQBE		Quambone Royona Airstrip	Quambone, New South Wales	30°52′45″S 147°50′31″E	
YQBK		Quambatook Airstrip	Quambatook, Victoria	35°51′24″S 143°30′52″E	
YQCF		Queenscliff Heliport	Queenscliff, Victoria	38°15′56″S 144°40′00″E	
YQCI		Curtis Island QCLNG Heliport	Curtis Island, Queensland	23°46′01″S 151°11′37″E	
YQDG		Quairading Aerodrome	Quairading, Western Australia	32°00′18″S 117°25′03″E	
YQDI	UIR	Quirindi Airport	Quirindi, New South Wales	31°29′55″S 150°31′05″E	
YQLP	ULP	Quilpie Airport	Quilpie, Queensland	26°36′34″S 144°15′28″E	
YQNS	UEE	Queenstown Airport	Queenstown, Tasmania	42°04′32″S 145°31′51″E	
YQON		Quondong Aerodrome	Quondong, South Australia	33°05′12″S 140°19′48″E	
YQRN		Quorn Airstrip	Quorn, South Australia	32°19′30″S 138°06′20″E	
YQUE		Questa Park Airstrip	White Cliffs, New South Wales	30°23′30″S 143°08′31″E	
