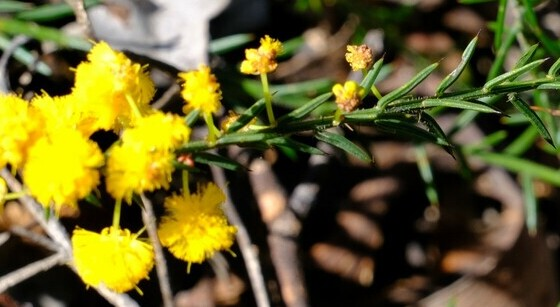

Conservation status
- Priority Two — Poorly Known Taxa (DEC)

Scientific classification
- Kingdom: Plantae
- Clade: Embryophytes
- Clade: Tracheophytes
- Clade: Spermatophytes
- Clade: Angiosperms
- Clade: Eudicots
- Clade: Rosids
- Order: Fabales
- Family: Fabaceae
- Subfamily: Caesalpinioideae
- Clade: Mimosoid clade
- Genus: Acacia
- Species: A. retrorsa

Binomial name
- Acacia retrorsa Meisn.
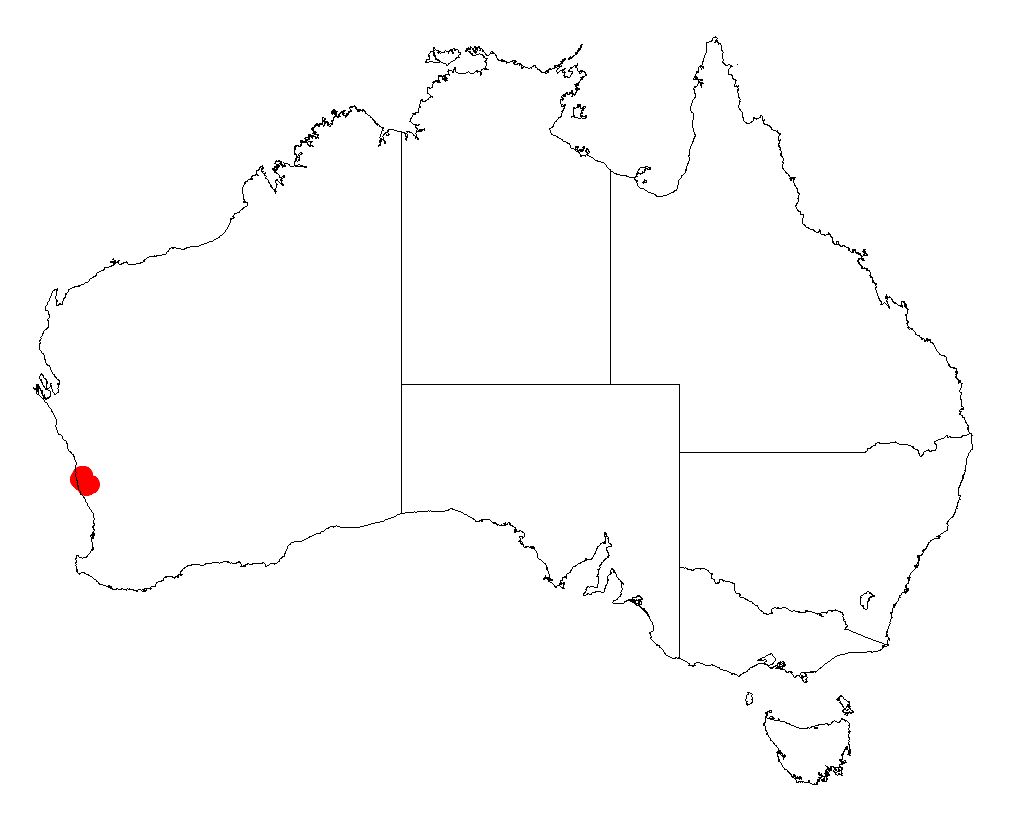
- Occurrence data from AVH

= Acacia retrorsa =

Species of legume

Acacia retrorsa is a shrub of the genus Acacia and the subgenus Phyllodineae that is endemic to western Australia

== Description ==
The spreading prostrate shrub typically grows to a height of 0.05 to 0.5 metres (0 to 2 ft) with a sprawling habit. The multistemmed shrub has quite slender branches with a length of up to 1 m (3 ft 3 in) It has glabrous or slightly hairy, green coloured branchlets that have fine yellow-coloured ribbing. Like most species of Acacia it has phyllodes rather than true leaves. The sessile and evergreen phyllodes are pointing backwards. The pungent, green and glabrous have a linear shape and are straight to shallowly curved with a length of 15 to 25 mm (0.59 to 0.98 in) and a width of 1 to 2 mm (0.039 to 0.079 in) with a prominent midrib. It blooms from August to September and produces yellow flowers. The inflorescences occur on single headed racemes and have spherical flower-heads containing 16 to 24 light golden coloured flowers. The glarous, firmly chartaceous and dark brown seed pods that form after flowering resemble a string of beads and have a length of up to 6 cm (2.4 in) and a width of 3.5 to 4.5 mm (0.14 to 0.18 in). The blackish seeds have a yellow centre and have an oblong to elliptic shape with a length of about 4 mm (0.16 in) and have a club-shaped aril.

== Taxonomy ==
The species was first formally described by the botanist Carl Meissner in 1855 as part of the work Botanische Zeitung . It was reclassified as Racosperma retrorsum by Leslie Pedley in 2003 then transferred back to genus Acacia in 2006. It is thought to be allied to the Acacia pravifolia group and superficially resembles Acaca declinata.

== Distribution ==
It is native to an area in the Wheatbelt and Mid West regions of Western Australia where it is found growing in gravelly, sandy or loamy soils over or around laterite. It has a very limited range between Jurien Bay in the north down to around Eneabba in the south where it is usually as a part of low open woodland or low open heathland communities.

== See also ==
- List of Acacia species
