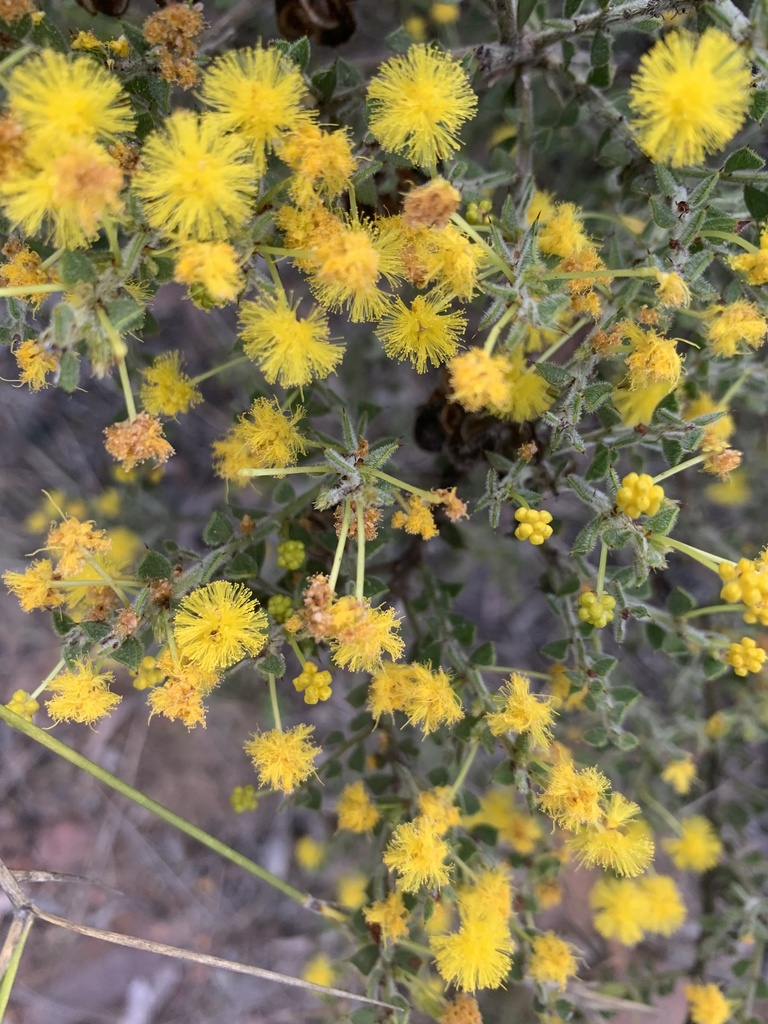
- In the Pilliga Nature Reserve

Scientific classification
- Kingdom: Plantae
- Clade: Embryophytes
- Clade: Tracheophytes
- Clade: Spermatophytes
- Clade: Angiosperms
- Clade: Eudicots
- Clade: Rosids
- Order: Fabales
- Family: Fabaceae
- Subfamily: Caesalpinioideae
- Clade: Mimosoid clade
- Genus: Acacia
- Species: A. pravifolia

Binomial name
- Acacia pravifolia F.Muell.
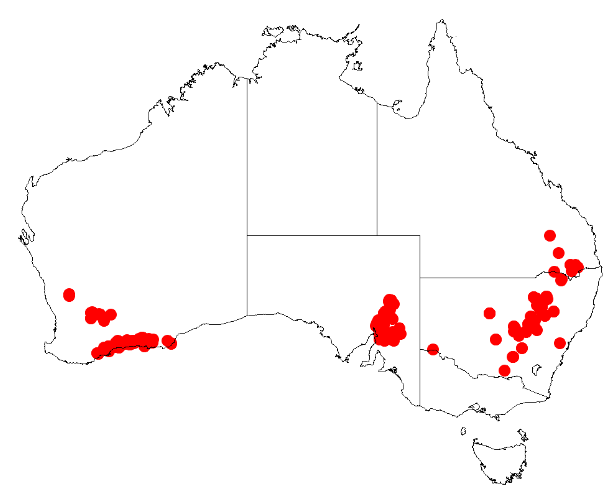
- Occurrence data from AVH

= Acacia pravifolia =

Species of legume

Acacia pravifolia, commonly known as the coil-pod wattle, is a shrub of the genus Acacia and the subgenus Phyllodineae that is native to three areas of Australia.

== Description ==
The intricate and prickly shrub typically grows to a height of 0.1 to 2.0 metres (0.3 to 6.6 ft). It has hairy, rigid and pungent branchlets. Like most species of Acacia it has phyllodes rather than true leaves. The sessile and evergreen phyllodes have a variable and inequilateral shape that is usually obtriangular to obdeltate with a length of 3 to 15 mm (0.12 to 0.59 in) and a width of 2.5 to 7 mm (0.098 to 0.276 in) and a prominent midrib. It blooms from August to October and produces yellow flowers.

== Taxonomy ==
The species was first formally described by the botanist Ferdinand von Mueller in 1858 as part of the work Fragmenta Phytographiae Australiae. It was reclassified as Racosperma pravifolium by Leslie Pedley in 1987 then returned to genus Acacia in 2006. Other synonyms include Acacia prunifolia.

== Distribution ==
The shrub it has a discontinuous distribution. It is native to an area in the Wheatbelt, Great Southern and Goldfields-Esperance regions of Western Australia from Israelite Bay in the east to Boxwood Hill in the south west and Wubin in the north west. It is also found throughout the Mount Lofty Range and Flinders Range in South Australia from around Angepena Station to around Burra. It is also found in Queensland and New South Wales in the eastern states from between Cobar and Temora in the south to around Tara and Warwick. It is often found as a growing in rocky shallow as a part of open shrubland or woodland communities.

== See also ==
- List of Acacia species
