= Hawker Airport =

Hawker Wilpena Pound Airport
- IATA: none; ICAO: YHAW

Summary
- Owner: Flinders Ranges Council
- Location: Hawker, South Australia
- In use: Royal Flying Doctor Service Emergency Base
- Elevation AMSL: 321 ft / 98 m
- Coordinates: 31°52′35″S 138°24′15″E
- Interactive map of Hawker Wilpena Pound Airport

Runways
Direction	Length		Surface
Direction	ft	m	Surface
18/36	3,280	1,000	Asphalt

Hawker Airfield (ICAO:YHAW) is a regional airport located at Hawker, South Australia.

== Information ==
The airstrip services the greater Flinders Ranges area up North in South Australia. The airstrip has only 1 runway (18/36) which is made from Asphalt. The airfield services the RFDS services, with a close proximity to the Flinders Rangers Way.

There is a small parking area for small aircraft. There is also a small service area, with toilets and water. There is no Avgas.
