= Mutawintji, New South Wales =

Mutawintji
- Town
- Coordinates: 31°14′4″S 142°17′19″E
- Country: Australia
- State: New South Wales
- LGA: Unincorporated Far West Region
- Location: 139 km (86 mi) NE of Broken Hill, New South Wales

Government
  - State electorate: Barwon
  - Federal division: Parkes

Population
  - Total: 30 (2021 census)
- Postcode: 2880

Mutawintji is a small settlement in north-west New South Wales, Australia, about 139 kilometres (86 mi) northeast of Broken Hill. At the time of the 2021 census, Mutawintji had a population of 30 people.

Mutawintji is the Aboriginal word for "grass", reflecting the area's nature.

== Climate ==
Summer temperatures can reach 40 °C (104 °F) in Mutawintji.

== Tourism ==
Mutawintji is the location of Mutawintji National Park.

== Demographics ==
As of the 2021 Australian census, 30 people resided in Mutawintji, down from 32 in the 2016 census. The median age of persons in Mutawintji was 44 years. There were fewer males than females, with 44.8% of the population male and 55.2% female. The average household size was 3.8 people per household.
