= Mullaley, New South Wales =

Mullaley New South Wales
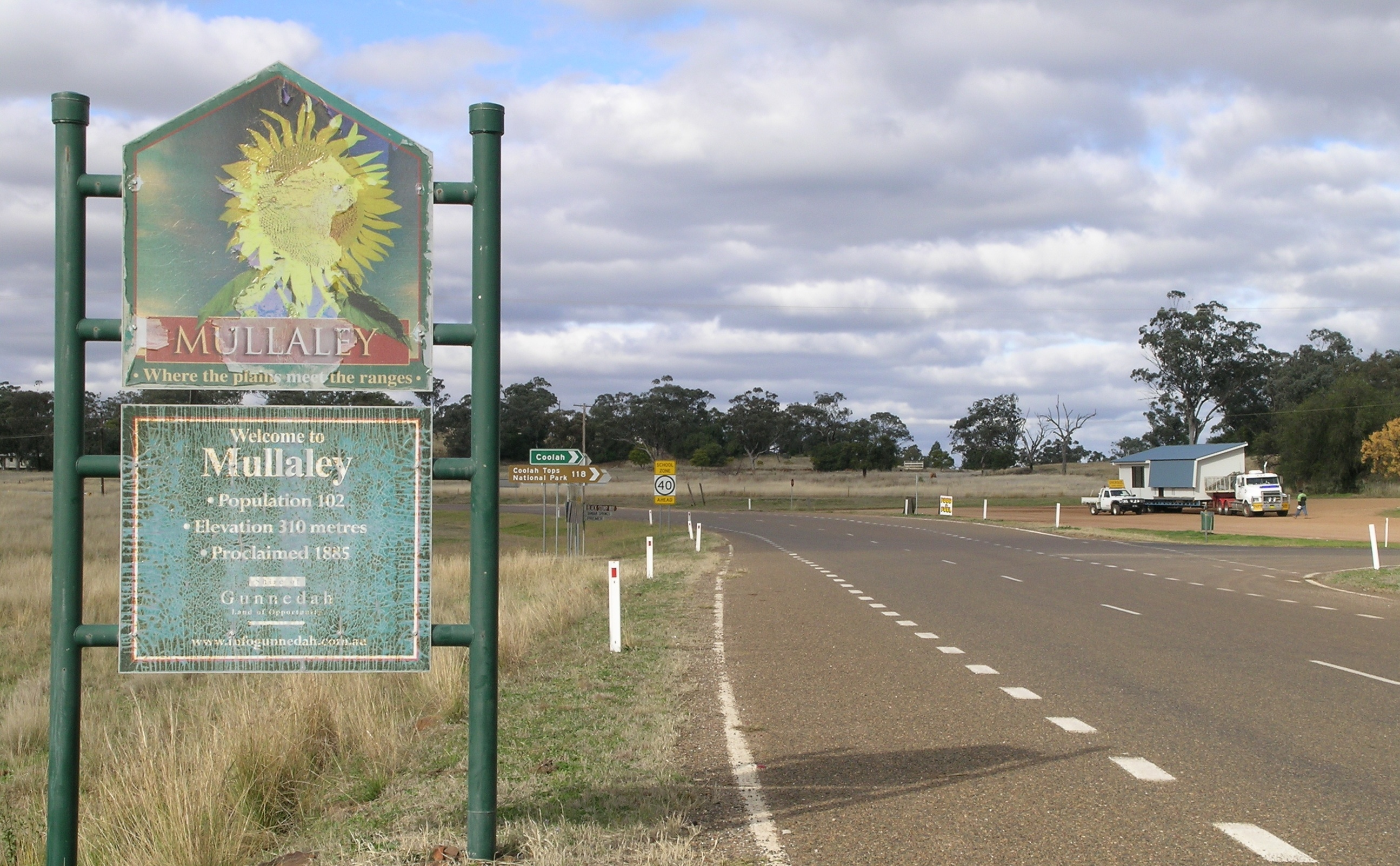
- Entry sign to Mullaley, NSW

- Coordinates: 31°6′S 149°55′E
- Population: 154 (2016 census)
- Established: 1885
- Postcode(s): 2379
- Elevation: 315 m (1,033 ft)
- Location: 38 km (24 mi) from Gunnedah; 110 km (68 mi) from Tamworth; 218 km (135 mi) from Dubbo; 343 km (213 mi) from Newcastle; 466 km (290 mi) from Sydney
- LGA(s): Gunnedah Shire Council
- County: Pottinger
- State electorate(s): Tamworth
- Federal division(s): Parkes

Mullaley is a village in the Gunnedah Shire, New South Wales, Australia.

== Geography ==
Mullaley is on the Oxley Highway, 38 km west of Gunnedah. The Coxs Creek runs across the highway on the western side of the village. Mullaley is on the crossroads of the roads from Boggabri in the north, Premer in the south, Gunnedah in the east and Coonabarabran in the west. The surrounding area is part of the highly fertile Liverpool Plains region.

The Mullaley district has an agricultural community that produces wheat, other grains, fat lambs and beef cattle.

== History ==
On 14 October 1999 a 40-minute storm dumped 76 mm of rain and hail on the Western Liverpool Plains region around Mullaley causing damage to dozens of farms. The heavy rain that fell caused localised flooding. Numerous homes were flooded as hail-clogged roof guttering overflowed.

At the 2016 census, Mullaley had a population of 154 people.

== Heritage ==
The Goolhi Graves on Old Goolhi Station, Mullaley have been placed on the Register of the National Estate.

== Amenities ==
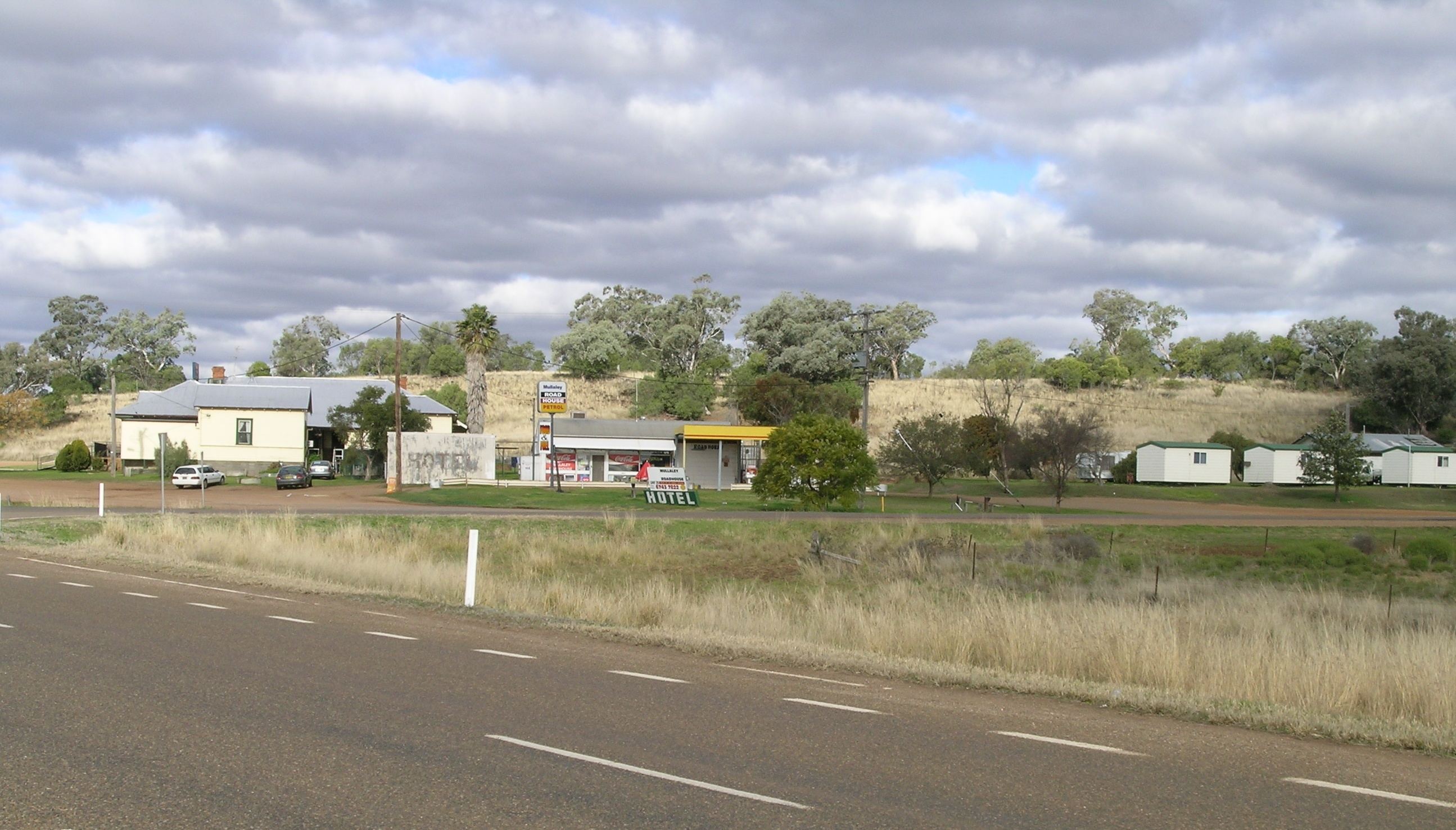
Mullaley, NSW

Mullaley has a General Store located in the post office which also has a nursery and hobby supplies.

The village now has a public school, sports ground, roadhouse, hotel, bus service, store, park and a stone war memorial with an honour roll.
