= Moonaree =

Coordinates: 31.967°S 135.871°E

Location in South Australia

Moonaree Station is a pastoral lease that operates as a sheep station in South Australia.

It is approximately 120 kilometres (75 mi) northeast of Minnipa and 125 kilometres (78 mi) southwest of Woomera. The property is adjacent to Lake Gairdner in the Gawler Range.

The station was established prior to 1885. At this time the property was owned by Messrs Davies and Co.

The area around Moonaree and Kumberta Downs was subjected to a prolonged heat wave in 1894 with a temperature of 170 °F (77 °C) recorded in the sun at Moonaree at the hottest part of the day with temperatures of 86 °F (30 °C) recorded two hours after sunset.

Davies, Todd and Co. placed Moonaree up for auction in 1895 when it occupied an area of 541 square miles (1,401 km^{2}) and was stocked with over 16,000 sheep and 50 horses. Acquired by the Hawker brothers, the property was struck by drought in 1902 and plagued by feral dogs. The Hawkers sold off Moonaree, Carriewerloo, Paralana and Kolenda Station.

The land occupying the extent of the Moonaree pastoral lease was gazetted by the Government of South Australia as a locality in April 2013 under the name Moonaree.

== See also ==
- List of ranches and stations
