= Angepena =

Pastoral lease in South Australia

Coordinates: 30.56817°S 138.84586°E

Location in South Australia

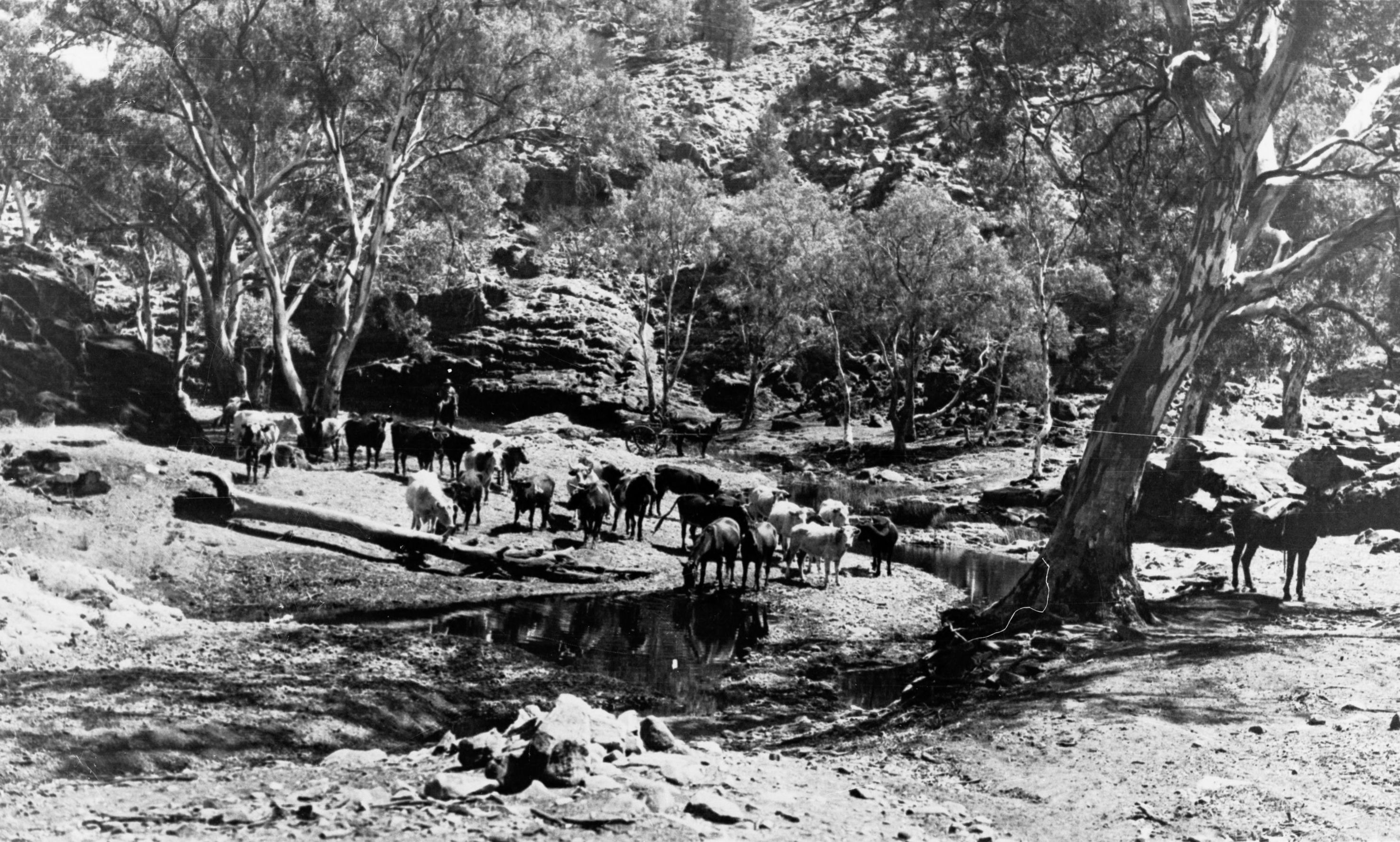
Mudlapena Springs Angapena Station, Flinders Ranges, 1946

Angepena Station is a pastoral lease operating as a sheep station in South Australia.

Situated approximately 42 kilometres (26 mi) southeast of Leigh Creek and 480 kilometres (298 mi) north of Adelaide, the property was established in 1855 by John Baker, who had applied for the Angepena and Pernunna leases the previous year. Baker appointed John Stewart to manage the property. The following year, a hut-keeper employed at the property was murdered by Aboriginal people, after which Baker asked for police protection. A police station was built later the same year, staffed by four troopers.

In 1888, Angepena occupied an area of 196 square miles (508 km^{2}). J. Snell owned the property in 1904, and the Snell family still owned and resided there in 1966.

In 1966, the property was bought by Waraweena proprietors and was run by Mr and Mrs SW Nicholls.

In 2007, the station was placed on the market and was going to be sold to a youth support organization, Operation Flinders. The traditional owners of the area, the Adnyamathanha people, who had been trying to buy a property in the region for the previous eight years, were devastated and asked the government to halt the sale. The sale was called off by Mr SW Nicholls, who then sold it to his son Mr & Mrs AS Nicholls.

The land occupying the extent of the Angepena pastoral lease was gazetted by the Government of South Australia as a locality in April 2013 under the name "Angepena".

Currently, Angepena is run as a sheep and cattle station and has been owned and run continuously for the last 50 years by the Nicholls family.

== See also ==
- List of ranches and stations
