= List of cities in Australia by population =

These lists of Australian cities by population provide rankings of Australian cities and towns according to various systems defined by the Australian Bureau of Statistics (ABS).

The eight Greater Capital City Statistical Areas (GCCSAs) are listed for the state and territorial capital cities. All Significant Urban Areas (SUAs) over 10,000 people are listed next followed by the 50 largest urban centres by population. Lastly, the 50 largest local government areas (the third tier of government below the federal and state/territorial governments) are also ranked.

== Definitions ==
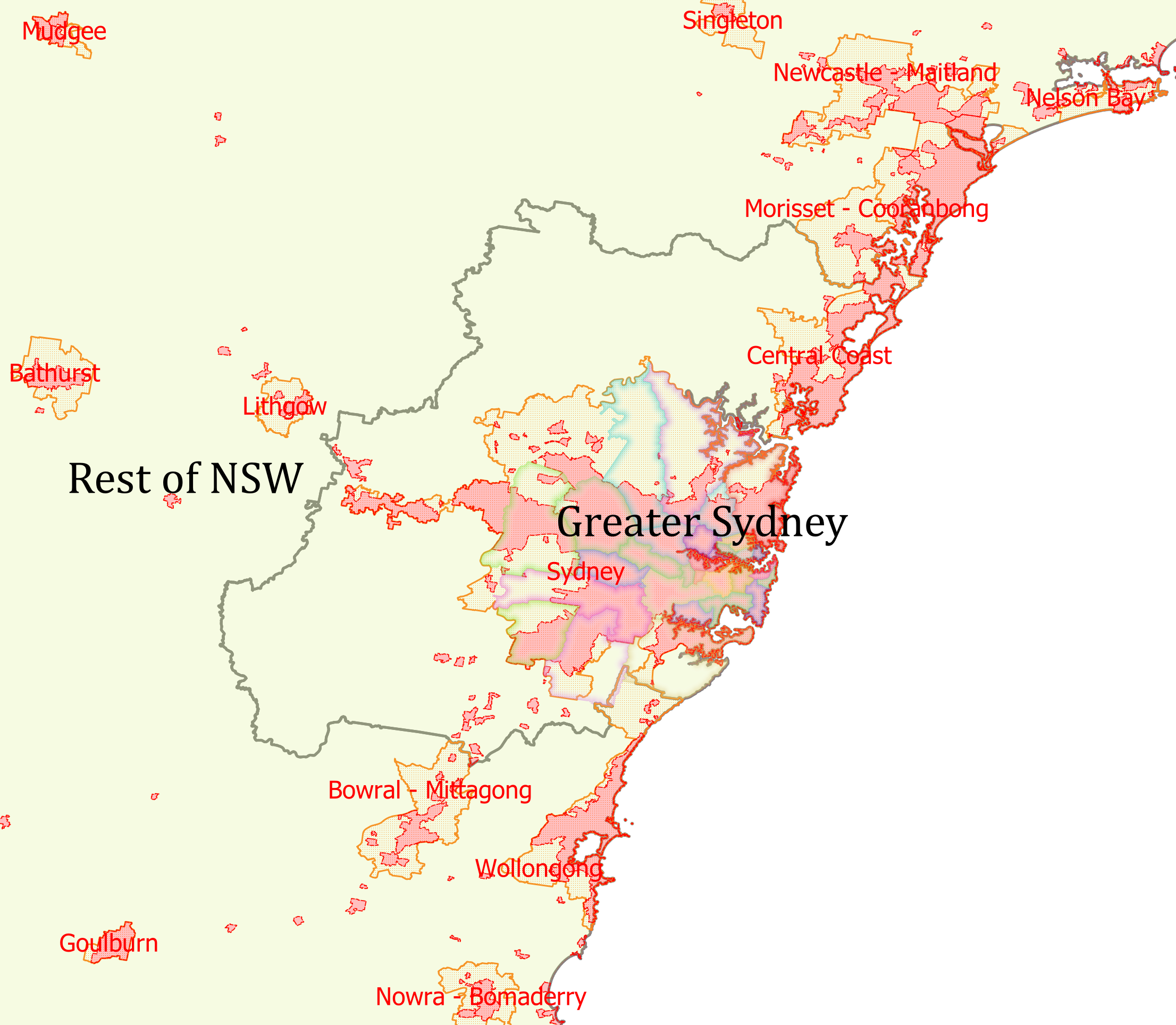
Sydney statistical areas

Illustrated are the various statistical areas defined by the Australian Bureau of Statistics for Sydney and its surrounds. The extent of the Greater Sydney Greater Capital City Statistical Area is designated by thick grey line and black text. The greater capital city statistical areas are the eight unique statistical divisions delineating the broadest possible concept of each state or territory capital city, constructed from one or more whole labour market areas (designated SA4 in the Australian Statistical Geography Standard). The rest of NSW area includes the entire remainder of the state, as each state or territory has only one GCCSA.

The Significant Urban Areas are designated by solid orange lines with stippled fill and red text. Significant urban areas are statistical divisions designed to represent significant towns and cities or associated collections of smaller towns, with total populations of 10,000 people or more. They consist of single, or clusters of, urban centres/localities (see below), and are constructed from one or more SA2 units, which are collations of suburbs and localities designed for consistent statistical output between censuses.

The urban centres/localities are designated by dashed red lines with pink fill. Urban centres/localities are statistical divisions delineating the contiguous built up, or urban areas of cities, towns and most small settlements. They are constructed from the smallest statistical output areas (SA1). The population of urban centres is only updated every five years during the Census and is not estimated yearly by the ABS.

Also represented are 31 outlined coloured areas. These are the 31 local government areas that are commonly understood as comprising Sydney, albeit unofficially.

== Greater Capital City Statistical Areas by population ==
Each capital city forms its own Greater Capital City Statistical Area (GCCSA), which according to the Australian Bureau of Statistics (ABS) represents a broad functional definition of each of the eight state and territorial capital cities. In Australia, the population of the GCCSA is the most-often quoted figure for the population of capital cities. These units correspond broadly to the international concept of metropolitan areas.

Rank	Greater Capital City Statistical Area	State or territory	Estimated resident population		Ten-year growth rate	Included SUA(s)
Rank	Greater Capital City Statistical Area	State or territory	June 2025	June 2015	Ten-year growth rate	Included SUA(s)
1	Greater Sydney	New South Wales	5,638,830	4,921,000	+14.59%	Sydney; Central Coast
2	Greater Melbourne	Victoria	5,435,590	4,529,500	+20.00%	Melbourne; Bacchus Marsh; Gisborne
3	Greater Brisbane	Queensland	2,833,524	2,308,700	+22.73%	Brisbane
4	Greater Perth	Western Australia	2,452,765	2,039,200	+20.28%	Perth
5	Greater Adelaide	South Australia	1,491,015	1,316,800	+13.23%	Adelaide
6	Australian Capital Territory (Note: The GCCSA for Canberra covers the entire ACT, and is formally titled as such.)	Australian Capital Territory	484,630	390,700	+24.04%	Canberra–Queanbeyan (ACT part only)
7	Greater Hobart	Tasmania	255,250	221,000	+15.50%	Hobart
8	Greater Darwin	Northern Territory	159,284	142,300	+11.94%	Darwin

== Significant Urban Areas by population ==
The following table ranks all the Significant Urban Areas (SUAs) with a population greater than 10,000 people in 2025, including those of the capital cities (which are smaller than their respective GCCSAs, except for Canberra's, which includes adjacent Queanbeyan, in New South Wales). Capitals are in bold. Significant Urban Areas are defined to represent significant towns and cities, or agglomerations of smaller towns, that have at least 10,000 total population. Significant Urban Areas may contain more than one distinct urban centre. There are urban areas of greater than 10,000 people that the ABS does not currently classify as Significant Urban Areas.

70% of the Australian population live in the top eight most populous cities.

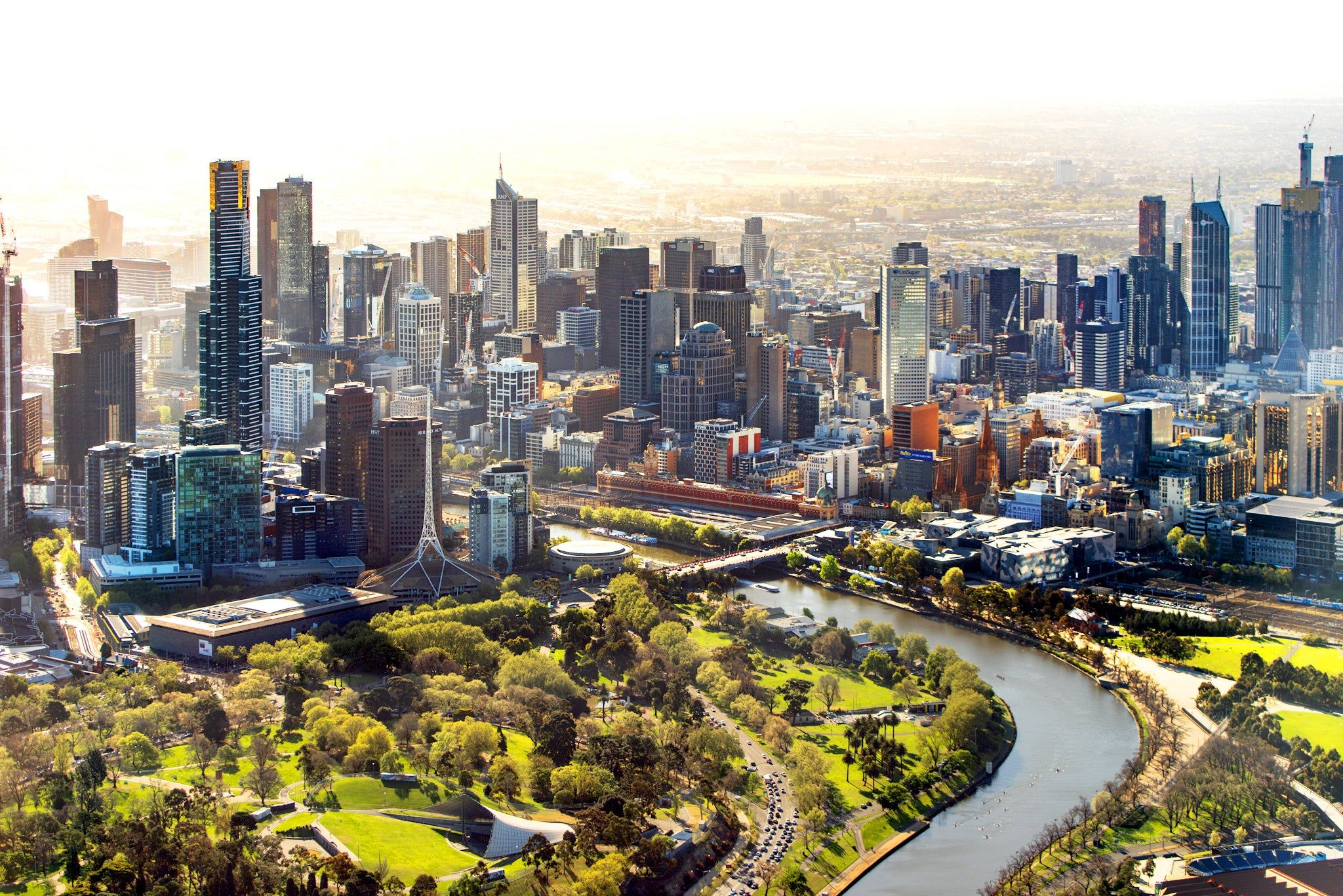
Melbourne

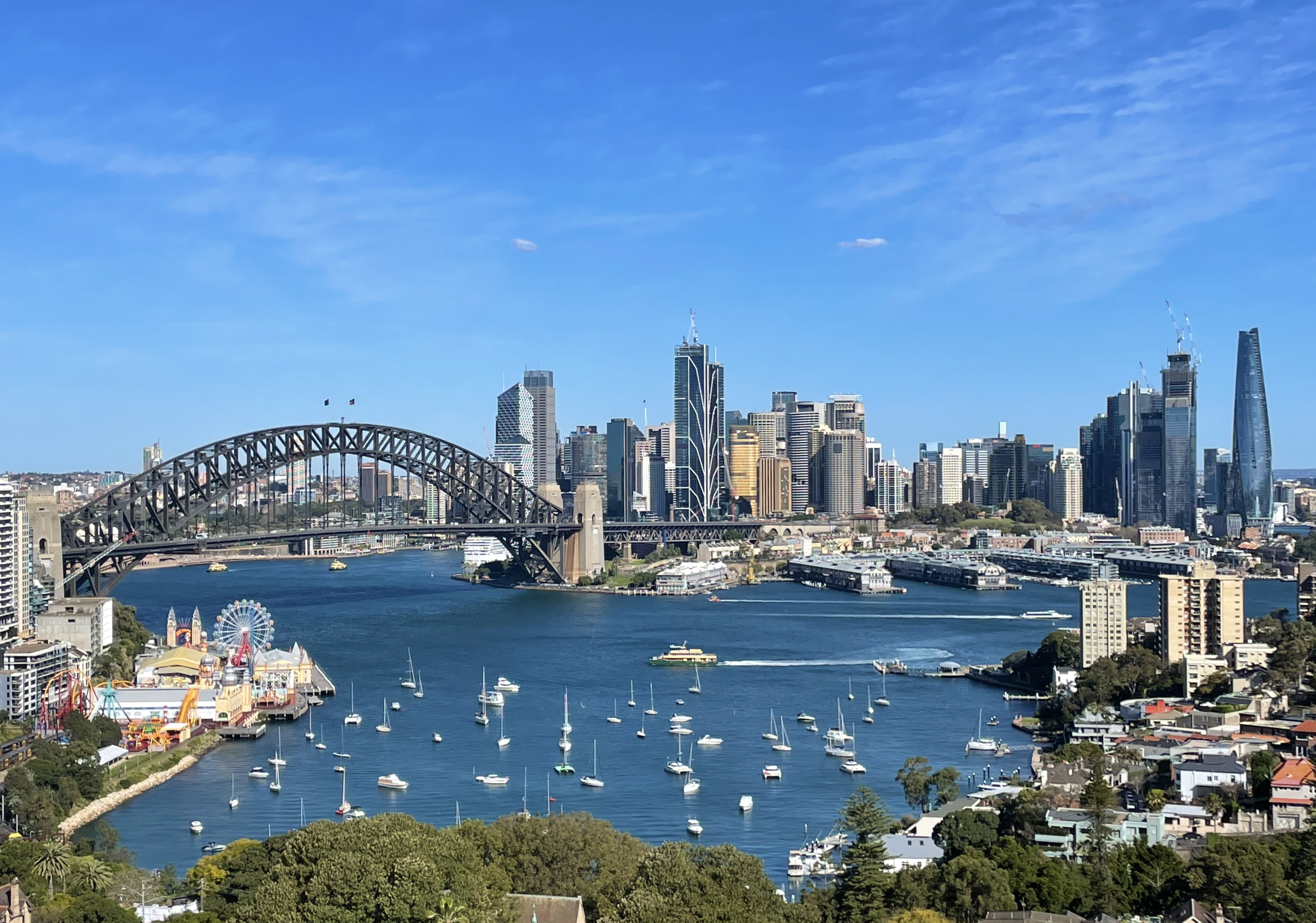
Sydney

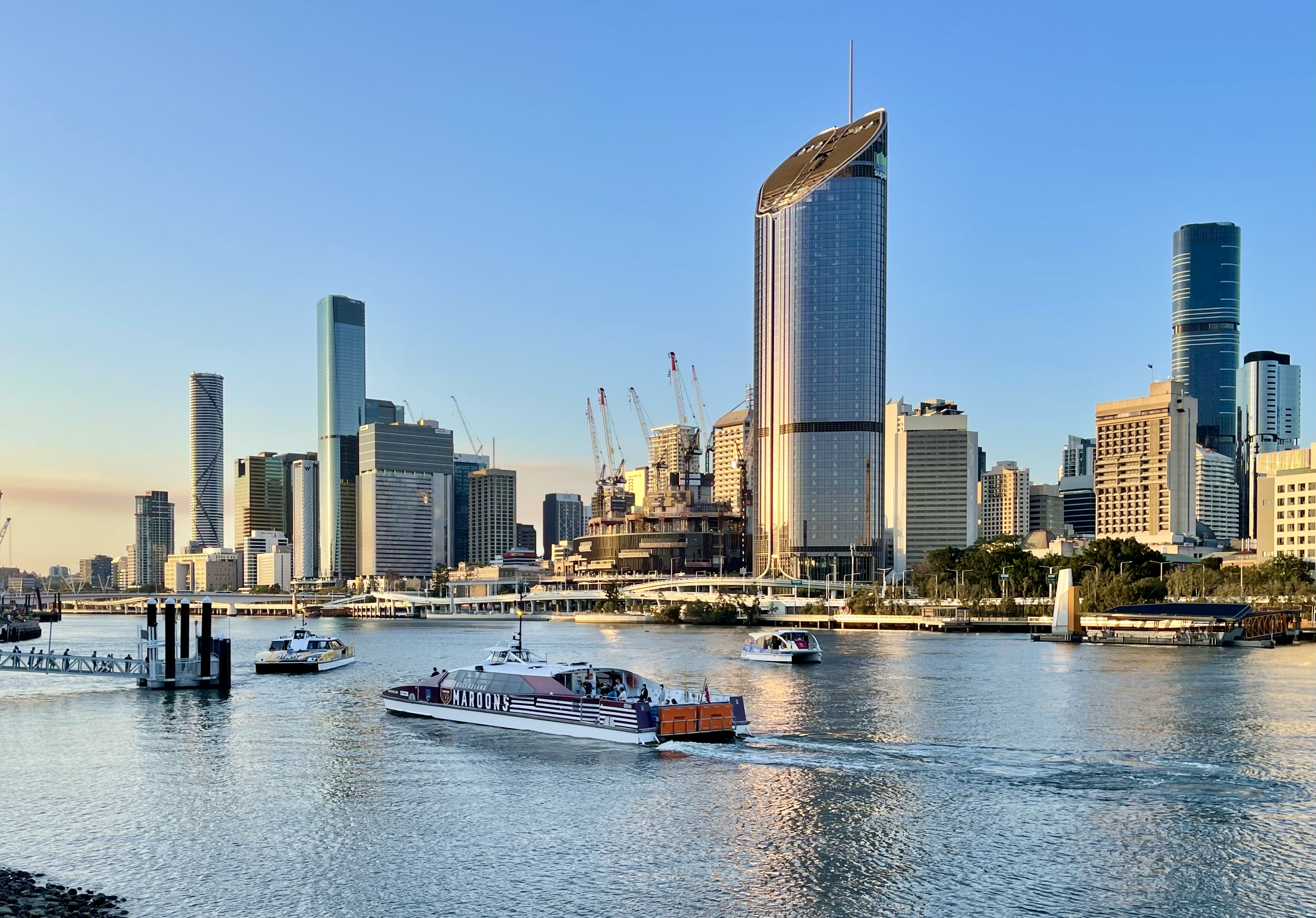
Brisbane

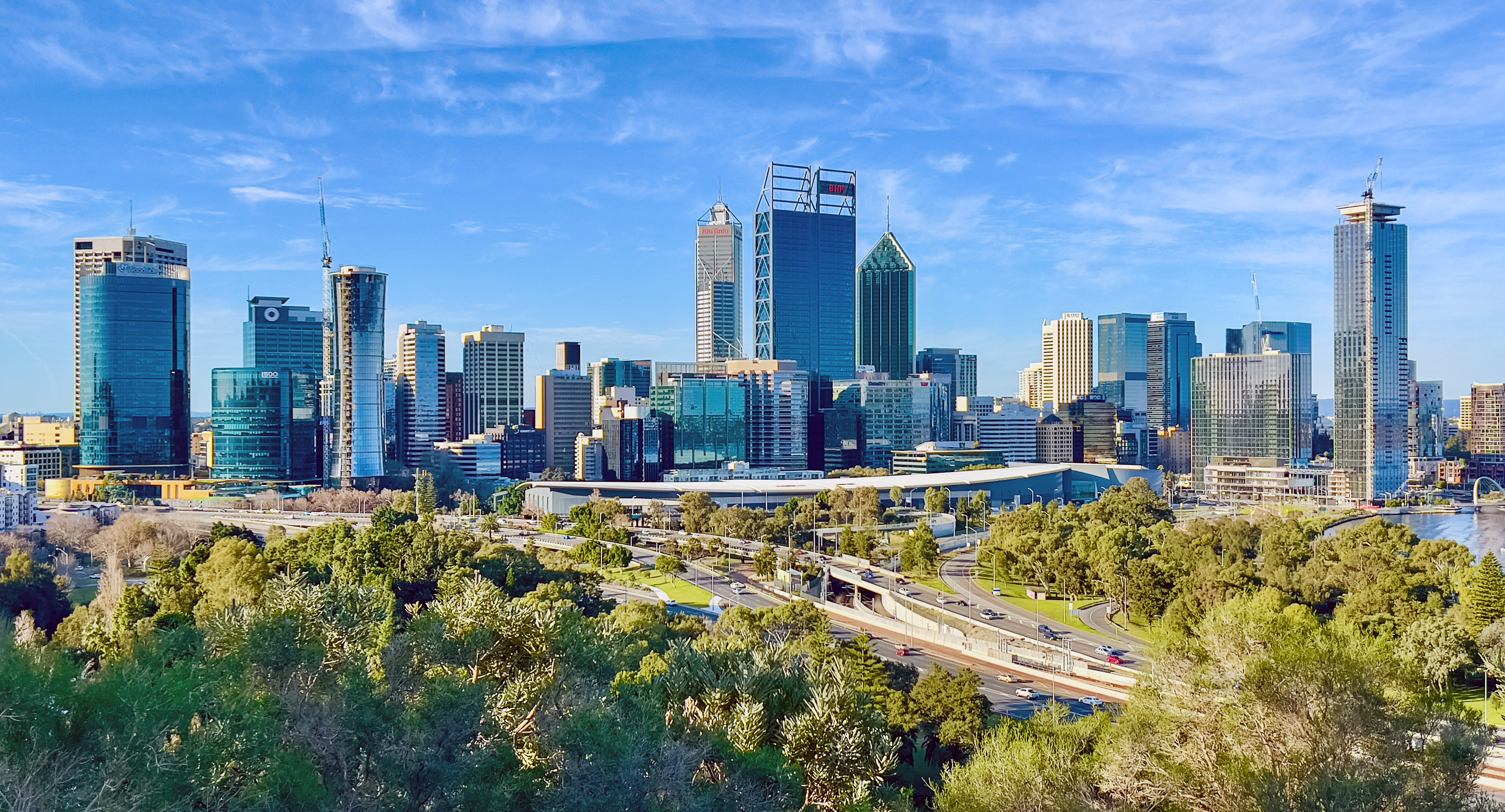
Perth

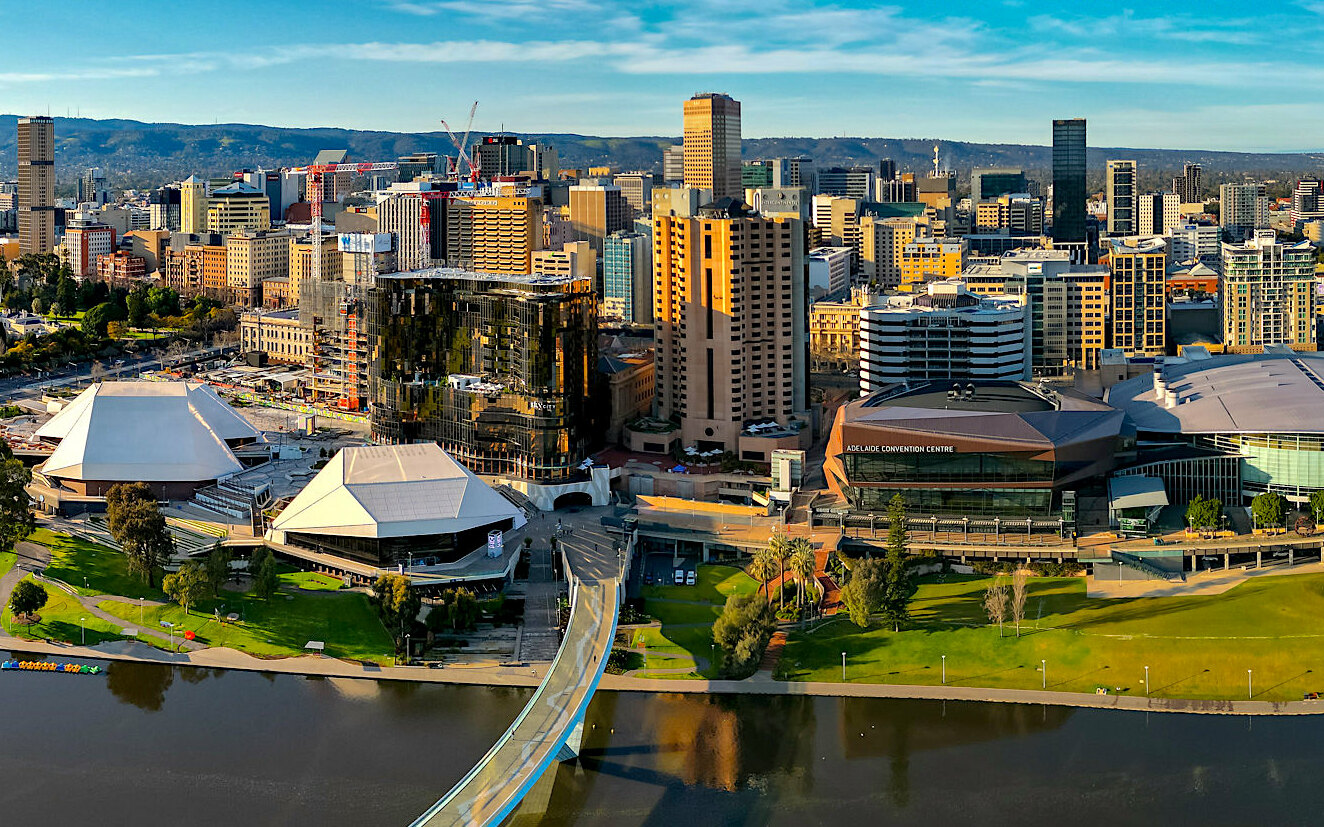
Adelaide

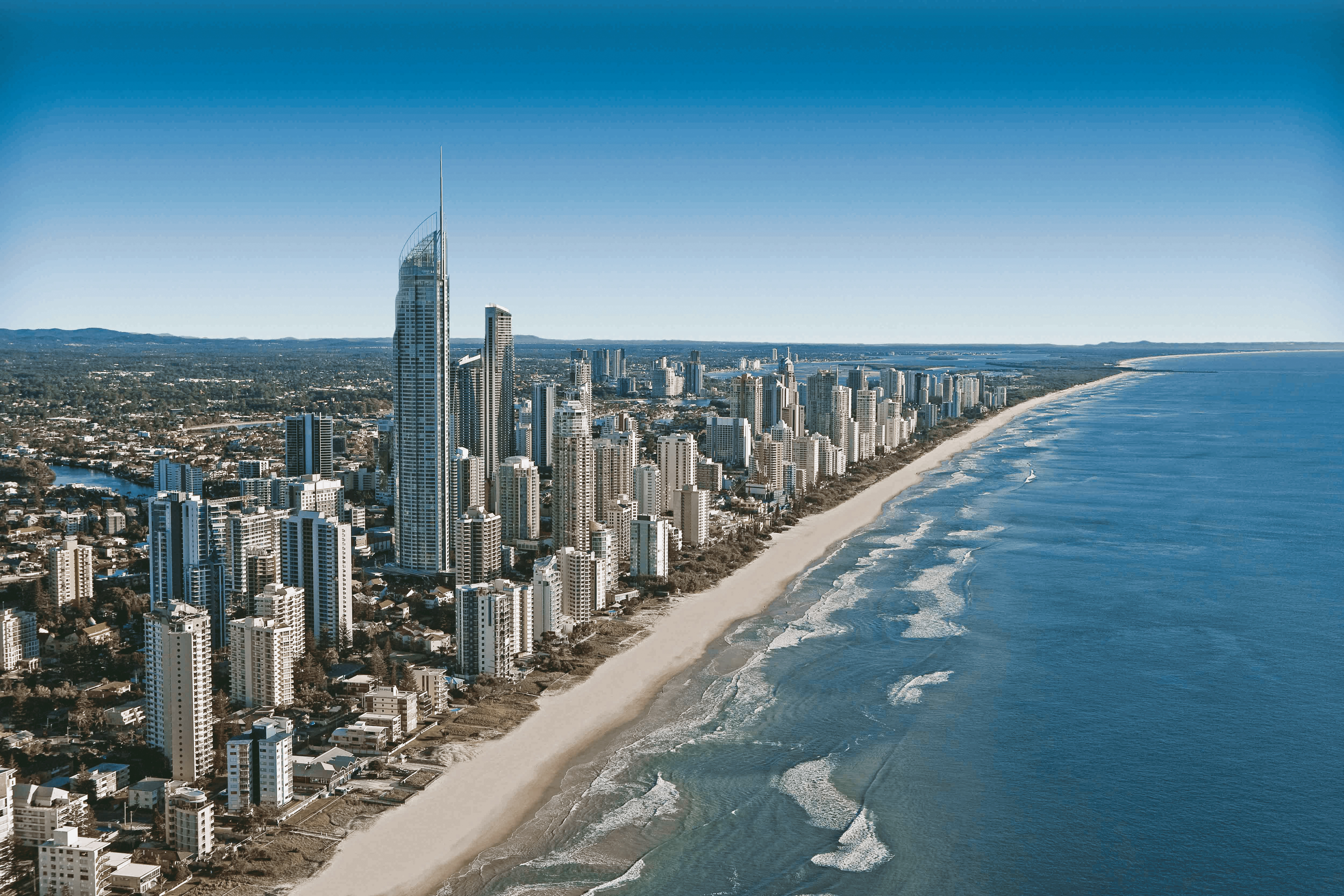
Gold Coast

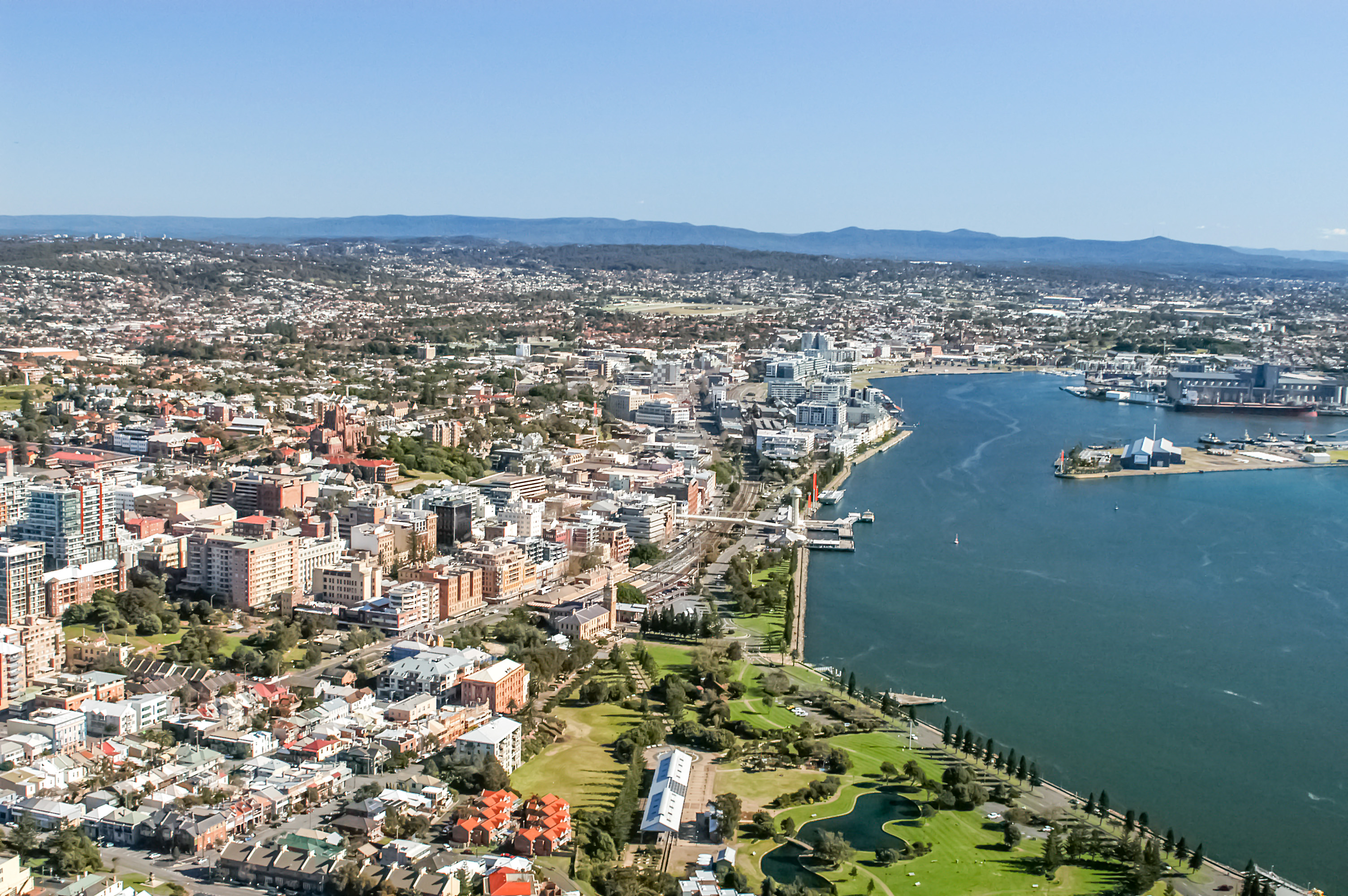
Newcastle

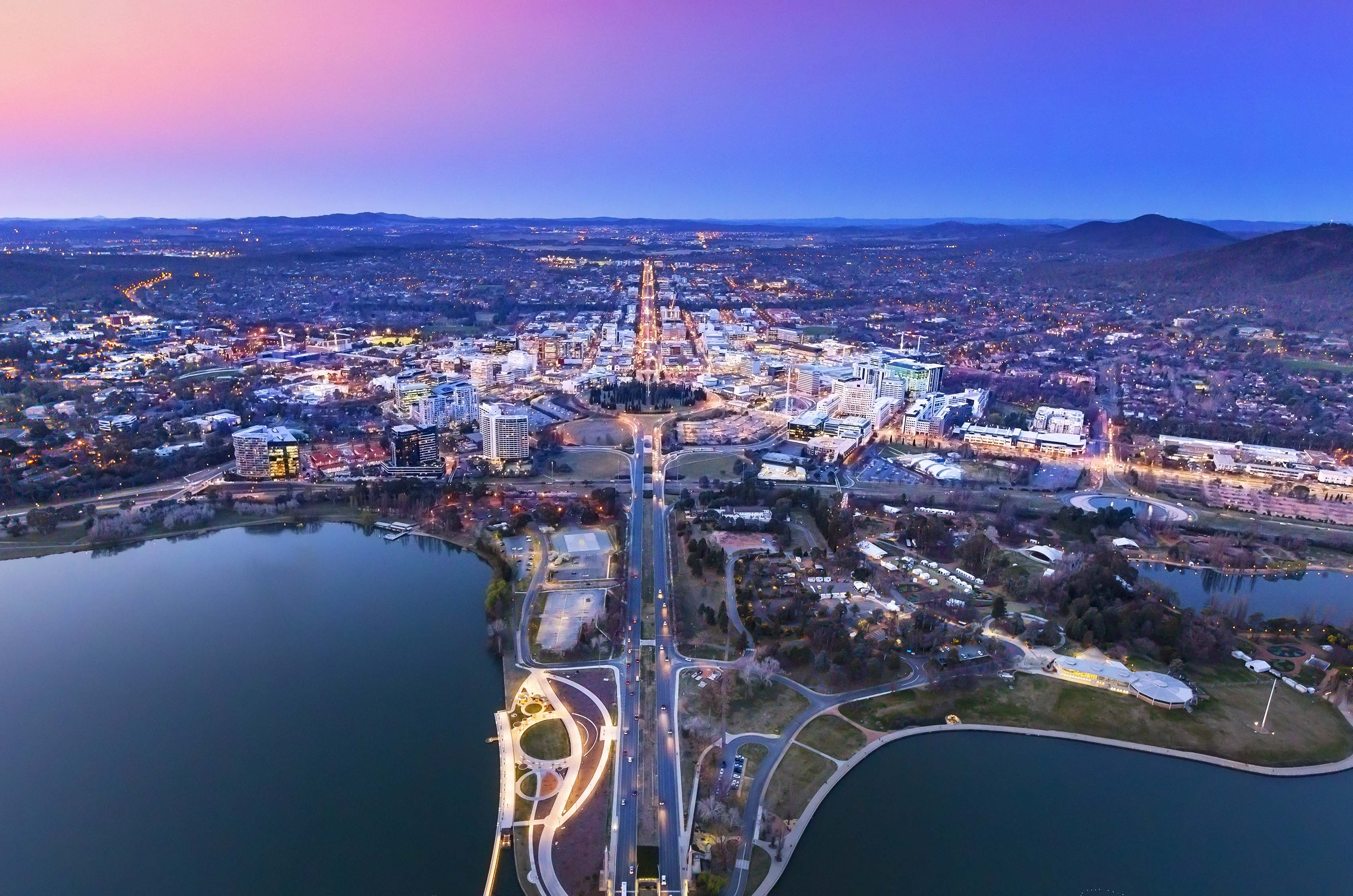
Canberra

Rank	Significant Urban Area	State or territory	Estimated resident population		Ten-year growth rate
Rank	Significant Urban Area	State or territory	June 2025	June 2015	Ten-year growth rate
1	**Melbourne**	Victoria	5,328,274	4,496,141	+18.51%
2	**Sydney**	New South Wales	5,219,674	4,547,327	+14.79%
3	**Brisbane**	Queensland	2,745,086	2,244,530	+22.30%
4	**Perth**	Western Australia	2,430,757	1,980,960	+22.71%
5	**Adelaide**	South Australia	1,470,938	1,294,981	+13.59%
6	Gold Coast–Tweed Heads	Queensland; New South Wales	761,634	627,217	+21.43%
7	Newcastle–Maitland	New South Wales	541,634	471,483	+14.88%
8	**Canberra**–Queanbeyan	Australian Capital Territory; New South Wales	521,049	432,759	+20.40%
9	Sunshine Coast	Queensland	424,741	333,833	+27.23%
10	Central Coast	New South Wales	354,189	329,895	+7.36%
11	Wollongong	New South Wales	322,343	291,687	+10.51%
12	Geelong	Victoria	314,381	247,166	+27.19%
13	**Hobart**	Tasmania	233,736	205,171	+13.92%
14	Townsville	Queensland	190,551	176,906	+7.71%
15	Cairns	Queensland	164,149	147,603	+11.21%
16	Toowoomba	Queensland	153,781	132,532	+16.03%
17	**Darwin**	Northern Territory	145,019	131,097	+10.62%
18	Ballarat	Victoria	120,939	99,662	+21.35%
19	Bendigo	Victoria	106,493	94,035	+13.25%
20	Albury–Wodonga	New South Wales; Victoria	102,435	89,306	+14.70%
21	Launceston	Tasmania	92,993	85,557	+8.69%
22	Mackay	Queensland	89,761	81,110	+10.67%
23	Bunbury	Western Australia	84,332	73,476	+14.77%
24	Rockhampton	Queensland	83,508	79,109	+5.56%
25	Bundaberg	Queensland	79,283	70,156	+13.01%
26	Coffs Harbour	New South Wales	77,244	69,239	+11.56%
27	Hervey Bay	Queensland	63,312	52,429	+20.76%
28	Wagga Wagga	New South Wales	58,117	55,359	+4.98%
29	Shepparton–Mooroopna	Victoria	55,332	50,161	+10.31%
30	Mildura–Buronga	Victoria; New South Wales	54,379	50,580	+7.51%
31	Port Macquarie	New South Wales	53,369	45,798	+16.53%
32	Gladstone	Queensland	48,505	45,632	+6.30%
33	Ballina	New South Wales	48,465	42,231	+14.76%
34	Warragul–Drouin	Victoria	47,510	34,253	+38.70%
35	Tamworth	New South Wales	46,024	41,582	+10.68%
36	Busselton	Western Australia	46,023	36,866	+24.84%
37	Traralgon–Morwell	Victoria	44,085	41,125	+7.20%
38	Orange	New South Wales	43,213	39,222	+10.18%
39	Bowral–Mittagong	New South Wales	42,529	37,927	+12.13%
40	Dubbo	New South Wales	42,452	36,715	+15.63%
41	Geraldton	Western Australia	42,104	38,705	+8.78%
42	Nowra–Bomaderry	New South Wales	40,264	36,200	+11.23%
43	Bathurst	New South Wales	39,013	35,374	+10.29%
44	Albany	Western Australia	38,287	33,767	+13.39%
45	Warrnambool	Victoria	36,689	34,367	+6.76%
46	Devonport	Tasmania	32,938	29,875	+10.25%
47	Morisset–Cooranbong	New South Wales	31,333	23,877	+31.23%
48	Kalgoorlie–Boulder	Western Australia	31,016	31,519	−1.60%
49	Victor Harbor–Goolwa	South Australia	30,900	25,851	+19.53%
50	Mount Gambier	South Australia	30,875	29,405	+5.00%
51	Alice Springs	Northern Territory	30,875	26,843	+15.02%
52	Nelson Bay	New South Wales	29,024	27,137	+6.95%
53	Maryborough	Queensland	28,658	27,219	+5.29%
54	Burnie–Somerset	Tasmania	28,643	27,170	+5.42%
55	Lismore	New South Wales	27,856	29,111	−4.31%
56	Bacchus Marsh	Victoria	27,182	20,207	+34.52%
57	Taree	New South Wales	26,858	26,375	+1.83%
58	Goulburn	New South Wales	25,647	23,138	+10.84%
59	Gympie	Queensland	24,591	21,024	+16.97%
60	Armidale	New South Wales	24,436	23,979	+1.91%
61	Gisborne	Victoria	24,163	20,439	+18.22%
62	Echuca–Moama	Victoria; New South Wales	23,393	20,625	+13.42%
63	Moe–Newborough	Victoria	22,612	21,400	+5.66%
64	Yeppoon	Queensland	22,522	18,355	+22.70%
65	Whyalla	South Australia	21,641	22,591	−4.21%
66	Forster–Tuncurry	New South Wales	21,272	20,635	+3.09%
67	Griffith	New South Wales	20,774	19,499	+6.54%
68	St Georges Basin–Sanctuary Point	New South Wales	20,492	18,224	+12.45%
69	Wangaratta	Victoria	20,019	18,624	+7.49%
70	Camden Haven	New South Wales	19,995	16,751	+19.37%
71	Murray Bridge	South Australia	19,938	17,963	+10.99%
72	Grafton	New South Wales	19,905	19,037	+4.56%
73	Karratha	Western Australia	19,659	17,073	+15.15%
74	Mount Isa	Queensland	18,162	20,227	−10.21%
75	Batemans Bay	New South Wales	17,849	16,348	+9.18%
76	Ulladulla	New South Wales	17,567	15,383	+14.20%
77	Broken Hill	New South Wales	17,515	18,360	−4.60%
78	Singleton	New South Wales	17,396	16,570	+4.98%
79	Port Hedland	Western Australia	17,300	14,587	+18.60%
80	Medowie	New South Wales	17,178	13,780	+24.66%
81	Port Lincoln	South Australia	17,064	16,157	+5.61%
82	Horsham	Victoria	16,882	16,363	+3.17%
83	Airlie Beach–Cannonvale	Queensland	16,597	12,996	+27.71%
84	Broome	Western Australia	16,506	14,613	+12.95%
85	Kempsey	New South Wales	16,272	15,055	+8.08%
86	Warwick	Queensland	16,197	15,417	+5.06%
87	Bairnsdale	Victoria	15,917	14,524	+9.59%
88	Ulverstone	Tasmania	15,471	14,453	+7.04%
89	Emerald	Queensland	15,238	13,951	+9.23%
90	Sale	Victoria	15,232	14,781	+3.05%
91	Port Pirie	South Australia	14,195	14,425	−1.59%
92	Port Augusta	South Australia	14,134	14,130	+0.03%
93	Mudgee	New South Wales	12,965	11,880	+9.13%
94	Muswellbrook	New South Wales	12,595	12,333	+2.12%
95	Esperance	Western Australia	12,580	12,519	+0.49%
96	Colac	Victoria	12,558	12,337	+1.79%
97	Lithgow	New South Wales	12,124	13,032	−6.97%
98	Castlemaine	Victoria	11,640	10,545	+10.38%
99	Byron Bay	New South Wales	11,482	10,018	+14.61%
100	Portland	Victoria	11,124	10,919	+1.88%
101	Kingaroy	Queensland	11,059	10,516	+5.16%
102	Swan Hill	Victoria	10,747	11,022	−2.50%

=== Map of the 20 largest Significant Urban Areas by population ===
20 largest Significant Urban Areas (state and territorial capitals bolded) by population

== Central business district populations ==
Below is a table of the capital city central business districts in Australia, defined as the suburb after which the city is named, or the core suburb in the case of Civic in Canberra. Melbourne has the highest population and highest population density living in its CBD, reflecting the high density of tall apartment buildings in the city centre. This definition only approximates each city's CBD; for example, the suburb of Sydney does not include adjacent Barangaroo or Haymarket, which are often considered to be part of the Sydney CBD, and while Adelaide's CBD ranks as the second most populated city centre, it also ranks as the least dense city centre, due to the suburb's much larger size than other city centre suburbs.

Rank	Capital City Central Business District	State or territory	CBD population (2021)	Area (km^{2})	Density (/km^{2})
1	Melbourne	Victoria	54,941	6.5	8,452.5
2	Adelaide	South Australia	18,202	10.5	1,733.5
3	Sydney	New South Wales	16,667	2.9	5,669.0
4	Perth	Western Australia	13,670	4.6	2,971.7
5	Brisbane	Queensland	12,587	2.5	5,034.8
6	Darwin	Northern Territory	7,149	1.9	3,762.6
7	Canberra	Australian Capital Territory	4,835	1.5	3,453.6
8	Hobart	Tasmania	3,390	1.9	1,784.2

== 50 largest urban centres by population ==
Urban centres are defined by the Australian Bureau of Statistics as being a population cluster of 1,000 or more people. For statistical purposes, people living in urban centres are classified as urban. The figures below represent the populations of the contiguous built-up areas of each city; with state and territory capitals in bold. These figures are only updated every census, as the ABS does not render population projections for urban centres, and as such can only be as up-to-date as the most recent census year. Unlike significant urban areas, urban centres that cross state boundaries are split into separate parts for each state.

Rank (2021)	Urban centre	Estimated resident population				SUA (if a part of a larger SUA)	Ranking in state or territory (2021)							
Rank (2021)	Urban centre	2021 census	2016 census	2011 census	2006 census	SUA (if a part of a larger SUA)	ACT	NSW	NT	QLD	SA	TAS	WA	VIC
1	**Sydney**	4,698,656	4,321,535	3,908,642	3,641,422			1						
2	**Melbourne**	4,585,537	4,196,198	3,707,530	3,371,888									1
3	**Brisbane**	2,287,896	2,054,614	1,874,427	1,676,389					1				
4	**Perth**	2,043,762	1,874,578	1,627,576	1,256,035								1	
5	**Adelaide**	1,245,011	1,165,632	1,103,979	1,040,719						1			
6	Gold Coast–Tweed Heads (Gold Coast part)	607,665	540,559	478,107		Gold Coast–Tweed Heads				2				
7	**Canberra**–Queanbeyan (Canberra part)	452,670	395,790	355,596		Canberra–Queanbeyan	1							
8	Newcastle	348,539	322,278	308,308	288,732	Newcastle–Maitland		2						
9	Central Coast	325,255	307,742	297,713	282,726			3						
10	Sunshine Coast	284,131	243,377	209,263	184,662					3				
11	Wollongong	280,153	261,896	245,942	234,482			4						
12	**Hobart**	197,451	178,009	170,975	128,557							1		
13	Geelong	180,239	157,104	143,291	137,220									2
14	Townsville	173,724	168,729	157,748	128,808					4				
15	Cairns	153,181	144,730	133,893	98,349					5				
16	**Darwin**	122,207	118,456	103,016	89,905				1					
17	Toowoomba	108,398	100,032	96,597	95,265					6				
18	Ballarat	105,348	93,759	85,935	78,221									3
19	Bendigo	100,649	92,379	82,794	76,051									4
20	Maitland	89,597	78,015	67,132	61,431	Newcastle–Maitland		5						
21	Launceston	80,943	75,329	74,085	71,395							2		
22	Mackay	80,455	75,710	74,219	66,874					7				
23	Melton	76,346	54,456	45,624	35,490	Melbourne								5
24	Bunbury	75,196	71,090	64,385	54,482								2	
25	Gold Coast–Tweed Heads (Tweed Heads part)	63,721	59,776	55,553		Gold Coast–Tweed Heads		6						
26	Rockhampton	63,151	61,214	61,724	60,827					8				
27	Hervey Bay	57,722	52,073	48,680	41,225					9				
28	Albury–Wodonga (Albury part)	53,677	47,974	45,627		Albury–Wodonga		7						
29	Bundaberg	52,370	50,148	49,750	46,961					10				
30	Coffs Harbour	51,069	48,225	45,580	26,353			8						
31	Shepparton–Mooroopna	49,862	46,199	42,741	38,773									6
32	Wagga Wagga	49,686	48,263	46,913	46,735			9						
33	Port Macquarie	47,793	44,814	41,491	39,219			10						
34	Orange	40,127	37,182	34,992	31,544			11						
35	Dubbo	38,783	34,339	32,327	30,574			12						
36	Sunbury	38,010	34,425	33,062	29,566	Melbourne								7
37	Albury–Wodonga (Wodonga part)	37,839	35,130	31,605		Albury–Wodonga								8
38	**Canberra**–Queanbeyan (Queanbeyan part)	37,511	36,248	35,878		Canberra–Queanbeyan		13						
39	Bathurst	36,230	33,587	31,294	28,992			14						
40	Mildura–Buronga (Mildura part)	35,652	33,444	31,361		Mildura–Wentworth								9
41	Tamworth	35,415	33,885	36,131	33,475			15						
42	Gladstone	34,703	33,418	32,073	28,808	Gladstone–Tannum Sands				11				
43	Nowra–Bomaderry	33,583	30,853	27,988	27,478			16						
44	Warrnambool	32,894	30,709	29,284										10
45	Geraldton	32,717	31,982	31,349	27,420								3	
46	Albany	31,128	29,373	26,643	25,196								4	
47	Blue Mountains	30,049	29,319	28,769		Sydney		17						
48	Kalgoorlie–Boulder	29,068	29,875	30,840	28,242								5	
49	Gawler	28,562	26,472	23,957	20,006	Adelaide					2			
50	Lismore	27,916	27,569	27,474	27,069			18						

== Urban areas by population ==
Main urban areas in Australia, according to the Demographia:

Urban area	Population	Area (km^{2})	Population density (/km^{2})
Sydney	4,836,000	2,194	2,204
Melbourne	4,709,000	2,880	1,635
Brisbane–Gold Coast	3,039,000	2,647	1,148
Perth	2,101,000	1,720	1,222
Adelaide	1,271,000	855	1,488

== 50 largest local government areas by population ==
Local government areas (LGAs) are the main units of local government in Australia. They may be termed cities, councils, regions, shires, towns, or other names, and all function similarly. Local government areas cover approx. 90% of the country. Significant sections of New South Wales and South Australia are unincorporated, that is, have no defined local government, along with the ACT and smaller sections of Northern Territory and Victoria. Brisbane is the only state capital city with its respective LGA (City of Brisbane) covering a significant portion of its urban area. In other capital cities, the central LGA covers a much smaller proportion of the total urban area. Most Australian capital cities have suburban local government areas significantly larger in population than the central local government area.

Rank	Local government area	Estimated resident population	Ranking in state (2024)				
Rank	Local government area	2024	QLD	NSW	WA	VIC	SA
1	City of Brisbane	1,355,640	1				
2	City of Gold Coast	681,389	2				
3	City of Moreton Bay	522,494	3				
4	City of Blacktown	438,843		1			
5	City of Casey	405,415				1	
6	City of Logan	392,339	4				
7	City of Canterbury-Bankstown	385,242		2			
8	Sunshine Coast Region	375,328	5				
9	Central Coast Council	354,803		3			
10	City of Wyndham	337,009				2	
11	City of Greater Geelong	289,565				3	
12	City of Parramatta	274,956		4			
13	City of Hume	271,709				4	
14	Northern Beaches Council	270,772		5			
15	City of Ipswich	259,886	6				
16	City of Liverpool	254,905		6			
17	City of Whittlesea	253,204				5	
18	Cumberland Council	252,399		7			
19	City of Stirling	249,872			1		
20	Sutherland Shire	238,614		8			
21	City of Wanneroo	237,628			2		
22	City of Sydney	237,278		9			
23	City of Penrith	228,661		10			
24	City of Wollongong	221,894		11			
25	City of Lake Macquarie	221,859		12			
26	City of Melton	219,697				6	
27	The Hills Shire	215,612		13			
28	City of Fairfield	212,210		14			
29	City of Monash	209,268				7	
30	City of Townsville	204,541	7				
31	City of Brimbank	198,152				8	
32	Inner West Council	190,939		15			
33	City of Melbourne	189,381				9	
34	City of Campbelltown	188,303		16			
35	City of Merri-bek	186,534				10	
36	Bayside Council	185,880		17			
37	Toowoomba Region	184,377	8				
38	City of Whitehorse	183,462				11	
39	City of Onkaparinga	182,821					1
40	City of Swan	179,207			3		
41	Cairns Region	178,104	9				
42	City of Boroondara	178,008				12	
43	City of Newcastle	176,860		18			
44	City of Joondalup	173,469			4		
45	Shire of Mornington Peninsula	171,450				13	
46	Redland City	170,225	10				
47	City of Greater Dandenong	167,298				14	
48	City of Kingston	166,521				15	
49	City of Knox	163,302				16	
50	Georges River Council	161,593		19			

== See also ==
- Demography of Australia
- List of cities in Australia
- List of cities in Oceania by population
- List of largest cities in the world
- List of places in New South Wales by population
- List of places in the Northern Territory by population
- List of places in Queensland by population
- List of places in South Australia by population
- List of places in Tasmania by population
- List of places in Victoria by population
- List of places in Western Australia by population
- List of towns and cities in Australia by year of settlement
