= List of places in Queensland by population =

Overview of Queensland's most populous cities and towns

This is a list of places in Queensland by urban centre population.

== Urban Centres by population ==
Rank	Urban Centre	Population			Region456	Notes
Rank	Urban Centre	2021 census	2016 census	2011 census	Region456	Notes
1	Brisbane	2,287,896	2,054,614	1,874,427	South East Queensland	
2	Gold Coast	607,665	540,559	478,107	South East Queensland	
3	Sunshine Coast	284,131	243,337	209,263	South East Queensland	
4	Townsville	173,724	168,729	157,748	North Queensland	Includes Thuringowa
5	Cairns	153,181	155,638	133,893	Far North Queensland	
6	Toowoomba	108,398	100,032	96,567	Darling Downs	
7	Mackay	80,455	75,710	74,219	Central Queensland	
8	Rockhampton	63,151	61,214	61,724	Central Queensland	
9	Hervey Bay	57,722	52,073	48,680	Wide Bay–Burnett	
10	Bundaberg	52,370	50,148	49,750	Wide Bay–Burnett	
11	Gladstone	34,703	33,418	32,073	Central Queensland	
12	Maryborough	22,237	22,206	21,777	Wide Bay–Burnett	
13	Mount Isa	18,317	18,342	20,570	Gulf Country	
14	Gympie	19,435	18,267	17,285	Wide Bay–Burnett	
15	Nambour	20,918	18,181	16,250	South East Queensland	
16	Bongaree–Woorim	20,612	18,142	17,041	South East Queensland	Situated on Bribie Island
17	Yeppoon	18,789	16,350	15,141	Central Queensland	
18	Warwick	14,110	13,862	13,376	Darling Downs	
19	Emerald	14,089	13,532	12,895	Central Queensland	
20	Dalby	12,082	12,005	10,861	Darling Downs	
21	Bargara–Innes Park	13,000	11,055	10,052	Wide Bay–Burnett	
22	Gracemere	11,534	10,813	8,160	Central Queensland	
23	Kingaroy	10,147	10,066	9,586	Wide Bay–Burnett	
24	Tannum Sands–Boyne Island	9,715	9,528	9,348	Central Queensland	
25	Highfields	10,259	9,474	7,947	Darling Downs	
26	Airlie Beach	10,646	9,334	7,869	Central Queensland	
27	Sandstone Point–Ningi	9,929	9,094	8,027	South East Queensland	
28	Bowen	9,612	8,854	8,606	North Queensland	
29	Moranbah	8,899	8,333	8,626	Central Queensland	
30	Ayr	8,603	8,283	8,393	North Queensland	
31	Charters Towers	8,040	8,126	8,235	North Queensland	
32	Mareeba	8,585	7,736	7,296	Far North Queensland	
33	Tamborine Mountain	8,001	7,349	6,814	South East Queensland	
34	Innisfail	7,173	7,241	7,177	Far North Queensland	
35	Atherton	7,348	6,869	6,814	Far North Queensland	
36	Roma	6,522	6,853	6,905	Maranoa	
37	Gatton	6,852	6,330	6,180	South East Queensland	
38	Gordonvale	6,035	5,977	5,483	Far North Queensland	
39	Chinchilla	6,292	5,878	4,780	Western Downs	
40	Beaudesert	8,127	5,828	5,474	South East Queensland	
41	Biloela	5,667	5,742	5,809	Central Queensland	
42	Mount Cotton	7,302	5,703	4,274	South East Queensland	
43	Jimboomba – West		5,552	4,632	South East Queensland	
44	Goondiwindi	10,310	5,524	5,511	Southern Downs	
45	Beerwah	9,255	5,033	4,339	South East Queensland	
46	Stanthorpe	6,247	4,974	4,955	Southern Downs	
47	Kensington Grove–Regency Downs	5,512	4,778	3,995	South East Queensland	
48	Blackwater	4,567	4,618	4,838	Central Queensland	
49	Emu Park	4,860	4,577	3,736	Central Queensland	
50	Ingham	4,334	4,353	4,705	North Queensland	
51	Oakey	4,319	4,324	4,282	Darling Downs	
52	Port Douglas–Craiglie	4,624	4,307	3,939	Far North Queensland	
53	Jimboomba	5,581	4,266	3,599	South East Queensland	
54	Palmwoods	5,042	4,196	4,082	South East Queensland	
56	Yarrabilba	10,706	4,059	449	South East Queensland	
57	Lowood	4,082	3,951	3,146	South East Queensland	
58	Weipa	4,097	3,903	3,332	Far North Queensland	
59	Doonan–Tinbeerwah	4,887	3,816	3,576	South East Queensland	
60	Landsborough	4,635	3,793	3,708	South East Queensland	
61	Glass House Mountains	4,065	3,576	3,503	South East Queensland	
62	Laidley	3,976	3,499	3,225	South East Queensland	
63	Westbrook	3,864	3,447	2,646	Darling Downs	
64	Beachmere	3,309	3,438	3,143	South East Queensland	
65	Calliope	4,396	3,438	3,059	Central Queensland	
66	Proserpine	3,440	3,409	3,338	Central Queensland	
67	Nanango	3,438	3,393	3,566	South Burnett	
68	Sarina	3,487	3,366	3,538	Central Queensland	
69	Walkerston	3,567	3,204	3,089	Central Queensland	
70	Charleville	2,551	3,073	3,318	South West Queensland	
71	Mooloolah	3,191	3,050	2,846	South East Queensland	
72	Pittsworth	2,933	3,000	2,969	Darling Downs	
73	Home Hill	2,712	2,956	3,025	Central Queensland	
74	Thursday Island	2,840	2,940	2,610	Far North Queensland	
75	Woodford	3,735	2,936	2,351	South East Queensland	
76	Cooroy	3,485	2,900	2,691	South East Queensland	
77	Russell Island	3,698	2,836	2,473	South East Queensland	
78	Maleny	2,976	2,819	2,490	South East Queensland	
79	Fernvale	3,193	2,777	1,820	South East Queensland	
80	Longreach	2,738	2,738	3,137	Central Queensland	
81	Boonah	2,721	2,694	2,473	South East Queensland	
82	Macleay Island	3,193	2,679	2,570	South East Queensland	
83	Burnett Heads	2,908	2,651	2,631	Wide Bay–Burnett	
84	Cooloola Village	2,921	2,628	2,514	South East Queensland	
85	Yarrabah	2,505	2,560	2,408	Far North Queensland	
86	Cedar Vale	3,147	2,551	2,328	South East Queensland	
87	Logan Village	3,542	2,534	1,867	South East Queensland	
88	Palm Island	2,098	2,443	2,339	North Queensland	
89	Dysart	2,738	2,442	3,003	Central Queensland	
90	Mount Morgan	2,487	2,414	2,557	Central Queensland	
91	St George	2,508	2,393	2,648	South West Queensland	
92	Marian	3,615	2,359	2,254	Central Queensland	
93	Rosewood	3,074	2,337	2,156	South East Queensland	
94	Meringandan West	2,392	2,286	1,975	Darling Downs	
95	Cloncurry	2,524	2,258	2,314	North Queensland	
96	Kuranda	2,456	2,241	2,159	Far North Queensland	
97	Tin Can Bay	2,274	2,235	1,993	Wide Bay–Burnett	
98	Tully	2,252	2,223	2,264	Far North Queensland	
99	Samford Valley–Highvale	2,712	2,160	2,128	South East Queensland	
100	Alice River	2,590	2,139	2,108	North Queensland	
101	Moore Park	2,293	2,126	1,648	Wide Bay–Burnett	
102	Toogoom	2,344	2,076	1,870	Wide Bay–Burnett	
103	Murgon	1,966	2,055	2,091	South Burnett	
104	Clermont	2,079	2,043	2,177	Central Queensland	
105	Oakhurst	2,413	2,005	1,180	Wide Bay–Burnett	
106	Gowrie Junction	2,030	2,001	788	Darling Downs	
107	Cedar Grove	2,107	1,986	2,018	South East Queensland	
108	Dayboro	2,193	1,940	1,692	South East Queensland	
109	Kilcoy	2,351	1,897	1,713	South East Queensland	
110	Yandina		1,884	1,757	South East Queensland	
111	Hamilton Island		1,866	1,209	Central Queensland	
112	Cooroibah		1,831	1,744	South East Queensland	
113	Middlemount		1,828	1,912	Central Queensland	
114	Wondai		1,814	1,735	South Burnett	
115	Glenview		1,811	1,182	South East Queensland	
116	Jacobs Well		1,796	1,544	South East Queensland	
117	Mossman		1,760	1,731	Far North Queensland	
118	Curra	1,956	1,751	1,425	Wide Bay–Burnett	
119	Cooktown		1,749	1,619	Far North Queensland	
120	Pomona		1,737	1,552	South East Queensland	
121	Gayndah		1,717	1,644	Wide Bay–Burnett	
122	Crows Nest	1,808	1,710	1,596	Darling Downs	
123	Kooralbyn		1,681	1,372	South East Queensland	
124	Malanda		1,669	1,672	Far North Queensland	
125	Kingsthorpe		1,638	1,597	Darling Downs	
126	Withcott		1,615	1,371	South East Queensland	
127	River Heads		1,542	1,294	Wide Bay–Burnett	
128	Moura		1,537	1,705	Central Queensland	
129	Glenwood		1,444	1,259	Wide Bay–Burnett	
130	Wyreema		1,415	1,247	Darling Downs	
131	Doomadgee		1,398	1,255	Far North Queensland	
132	Meridan Plains		1,398	1,232	South East Queensland	
133	Millmerran		1,362	1,328	Darling Downs	
134	Hay Point	1,306	1,349	1,469	Central Queensland	
135	Gleneagle		1,349	1,130	South East Queensland	
136	Childers		1,307	1,411	Wide Bay–Burnett	
137	Barcaldine		1,287	1,318	Central Queensland	
138	Willowbank		1,280	1,209	South East Queensland	
139	Tolga – West		1,266	1,150	Far North Queensland	
140	Aurukun		1,266	1,289	Far North Queensland	
141	Cherbourg		1,266	1,226	Central Queensland	
142	Esk	1,230	1,259	1,250	South East Queensland	
143	Burrum Heads		1,255	1,068	Wide Bay–Burnett	
144	Plainland		1,254	1,055	South East Queensland	
145	Cardwell		1,254	1,178	Far North Queensland	
146	Clifton		1,249	1,187	Darling Downs	
147	Wongaling Beach		1,245	1,064	Far North Queensland	
148	Walloon		1,217	1,192	South East Queensland	
149	Rainbow Beach	1,176	1,215	1,101	Wide Bay–Burnett	
150	Normanton		1,208	1,214	Gulf Country	
151	Laidley Heights		1,202	1,180	South East Queensland	
152	Jandowae		1,201	1,101	Darling Downs	
153	Allingham		1,199	1,234	Far North Queensland	
154	Nelly Bay		1,180	1,053	North Queensland	
155	Bamaga		1,163	1,045	Far North Queensland	
156	Mundubbera		1,160	1,041	Wide Bay–Burnett	
157	Bakers Creek		1,159	468	Central Queensland	
158	Cambooya		1,141	1,041	Darling Downs	
159	Gununa		1,137	1,128	Gulf Country	
160	Miles		1,134	1,169	Darling Downs	
161	Tieri		1,129	1,486	Central Queensland	
162	Collinsville	1,301	1,108	1,501	Central Queensland	
163	Woodgate	1,359	1,078	940	Wide Bay–Burnett	
164	Kiels Mountain	1,168	1,070	984	South East Queensland	
165	Blackall	1,064	1,060	1,218	Central Queensland	
166	Howard		1,054	1,015	Wide Bay–Burnett	
167	Hughenden		1,049	1,151	North Queensland	
168	Yungaburra		1,043	956	Far North Queensland	
169	Mulambin		1,042	613	Central Queensland	
170	Monto	1,021	1,030	1,117	Wide Bay–Burnett	
171	Toogoolawah		1,027	961	South East Queensland	
172	Cunnamulla		1,022	1,191	South West Queensland	
173	Rangewood		1,010	1,082	North Queensland	
174	Capella		1,008	926	Central Queensland	
175	D’Aguilar		1,006	830	South East Queensland	
176	Mirani		1,001	1,010	Central Queensland	
177	The Palms		995	865	Wide Bay–Burnett	
178	Eumundi		985	790	South East Queensland	
179	Tolga	1,277	984	878	Far North Queensland	
180	Bluewater Park		965	903	North Queensland	
181	Balgal Beach		963	377	North Queensland	
182	Woorabinda		960	936	Central Queensland	
183	Babinda		961	1,070	Far North Queensland	
184	Cooran	1,021	952	845	South East Queensland	
185	Napranum		947	852	Far North Queensland	
186	Sunshine Acres		947	808	Wide Bay–Burnett	
187	Kowanyama		944	1,030	Far North Queensland	
188	Mundoolun		942	746	South East Queensland	
189	Flaxton		927	883	South East Queensland	
190	Blue Mountain Heights		925	820	Darling Downs	
191	Mapleton	1,014	923	848	South East Queensland	
192	South Mission Beach		921	774	Far North Queensland	
193	Herberton		907	932	Far North Queensland	
194	Kureelpa		907	851	South East Queensland	
195	Agnes Water		902	669	Central Queensland	
196	Goldsborough		901	712	Far North Queensland	
197	Belvedere		892	850	Far North Queensland	
198	Black River		886	857	North Queensland	
199	Dunwich		886	886	South East Queensland	
200	Winton	856	874	954	Central Queensland	
201	Yarraman		863	910	Wide Bay–Burnett	
202	Gin Gin		857	899	Wide Bay–Burnett	
203	Springsure		857	841	Central Queensland	
204	Witta		857	850	South East Queensland	
205	Ravenshoe		851	857	Far North Queensland	
206	Hope Vale		849	973	Far North Queensland	
207	Elliott Heads		848	764	Wide Bay–Burnett	
208	Allora	843	841	890	Darling Downs	
209	Benaraby		838	841	Central Queensland	
210	Minden Village		829	739	South East Queensland	
211	Wonga Beach		817	745	Far North Queensland	
212	Badu Island		814	782	Far North Queensland	
213	Mission Beach		811	767	Far North Queensland	
214	Tara		810	854	Darling Downs	
215	Lower Beechmont		809	778	South East Queensland	
216	Kalbar	980	801	722	South East Queensland	
217	Mitchell		800	912	Western Downs	
218	Samford Village		792	751	South East Queensland	
219	Canungra		788	747	South East Queensland	
220	Delaneys Creek		784	713	South East Queensland	
221	Inglewood		769	818	Darling Downs	
222	Goombungee		765	670	Darling Downs	
223	Coochiemudlo Island		758	708	South East Queensland	
224	Pacific Haven		754	667	Wide Bay–Burnett	
225	Booral		750	720	Wide Bay–Burnett	
226	Helidon		750	714	South East Queensland	
227	Black Mountain		738	701	South East Queensland	
228	Texas	707	735	639	Darling Downs	
229	Bouldercombe		730	698	Central Queensland	
230	Brandon		719	821	North Queensland	
231	Killarney		716	775	Darling Downs	
232	Point Lookout		716	678	South East Queensland	
233	Thagoona		711	724	South East Queensland	
234	Deebing Heights		709	710	South East Queensland	
235	Biggenden		707	684	Wide Bay–Burnett	
236	Armstrong Beach		703	531	North Queensland	
237	Pormpuraaw		701	663	Far North Queensland	
238	Bluewater	715	699	575	North Queensland	
239	Lockhart River		697	463	Far North Queensland	
240	Sharon		694	668	Wide Bay–Burnett	
241	Toorbul		685	645	South East Queensland	
242	Forest Acres		665	595	South East Queensland	
243	Rubyvale		643	558	Central Queensland	
244	Boyland	677	633	541	South East Queensland	
245	Yabulu		632	674	North Queensland	
246	Blackbutt		630	620	Wide Bay–Burnett	
247	Kinka Beach		623	630	Central Queensland	
248	Kurrimine Beach		608	607	Far North Queensland	
249	Coominya		599	560	South East Queensland	
250	Marburg		595	568	South East Queensland	
251	Wangan	567	585	584	Far North Queensland	
252	Glenden	477	581	1,308	Central Queensland	
253	Aldershot	603	576	570	Wide Bay–Burnett	
254	Horseshoe Bay	611	574	540	North Queensland	
255	Sloping Hummock	640	569	571	Wide Bay–Burnett	
256	Gooburrum	556	567	576	Wide Bay–Burnett	
257	Prince Henry Heights	600	567	511	Darling Downs	
258	Sapphire	518	567	623	Central Queensland	
259	Glenore Grove	662	565	505	South East Queensland	
260	Quilpie	451	564	572	South West Queensland	
261	Nome	507	563	546	North Queensland	
262	Glendale	600	558	562	Central Queensland	
263	Injinoo	493	558	468	Far North Queensland	
264	Pie Creek	603	552	513	Wide Bay–Burnett	
265	Beechmont	848	551	509	South East Queensland	
266	Cooya Beach	1,046	548	543	Far North Queensland	
267	Taroom	578	533	584	Western Downs	
268	Horn Island	533	531	541	Far North Queensland	
269	Mareeba – South	597	530	524	Far North Queensland	
270	Karumba	487	529	587	Far North Queensland	
271	Apple Tree Creek	574	522	509	Wide Bay–Burnett	
272	Campwin Beach	511	522	574	North Queensland	
273	Nebo	618	518	459	North Queensland	
274	Goomeri	523	517	497	Wide Bay–Burnett	
275	Richmond	761	516	522	North Queensland	
276	Greenmount	559	508	405	Darling Downs	
277	Eromanga	98	119	400	South West Queensland	

== Greater Capital City Statistical Areas/Significant Urban Areas by population ==
Rank	GCCSA/SUA	2023 Estimate	2022 Estimate	2021 Estimate	2020 Estimate	2019 Estimate	2018 Estimate	2016 Census	2011 Census
1	Brisbane	2,706,966	2,628,083	2,582,007	2,560,720	2,514,184	2,462,637	2,270,807	2,065,998
2	Gold Coast	735,213	715,573	701,928	694,626	682,344	669,922	624,263	557,823
3	Sunshine Coast	407,859	396,922	387,472	379,141	370,253	360,584	307,545	270,771
4	Townsville	186,734	183,891	181,609	181,098	180,239	179,802	173,813	162,291
5	Cairns	160,933	157,905	155,574	155,321	154,034	152,803	144,785	133,912
6	Toowoomba	149,817	146,782	143,942	142,361	140,465	138,336	130,718	105,984
7	Mackay	88,162	86,733	85,408	84,207	82,793	81,836	78,683	77,293
8	Rockhampton	81,937	81,012	80,216	79,696	79,219	78,800	76,990	73,680
9	Bundaberg	77,261	75,791	74,413	73,629	72,911	71,990	69,063	67,341
10	Hervey Bay	60,838	59,614	58,228	57,267	56,343	55,344	52,075	48,678
11	Gladstone–Tannum Sands	47,294	46,303	45,754	45,715	45,513	45,091	43,870	41,967
12	Maryborough	28,346	28,039	27,820	27,644	27,491	27,388	26,930	26,215
13	Gympie	23,497	23,139	22,693	22,454	22,205	21,858	20,965	19,511
14	Yeppoon	21,688	21,177	20,574	20,104	19,699	19,290	18,111	16,372
15	Mount Isa	18,518	18,651	18,798	18,906	18,765	18,895	18,342	20,569
16	Warwick	16,064	15,890	15,756	15,622	15,604	15,547	15,413	14,609
17	Airlie Beach– Cannonvale	15,723	15,112	14,767	14,650	14,311	14,103		
18	Emerald	14,914	14,622	14,352	14,306	14,216	14,065	13,529	13,219
19	Kingaroy	10,898	10,753	10,659	10,582	10,535	10,511	10,288	9,808

== Local Government Areas by population ==
Rank	LGA	Population		Region	Notes
Rank	LGA	2016 census	2011 census	Region	Notes
1	Brisbane	1,131,155	1,041,842	South East Queensland	
2	Gold Coast	555,724	494,503	South East Queensland	
3	Moreton Bay	425,309	378,047	South East Queensland	
4	Logan	303,384	278,051	South East Queensland	
5	Sunshine Coast	294,365	306,909	South East Queensland	
6	Ipswich	193,737	166,903	South East Queensland	
7	Townsville	186,753	174,461	North Queensland	
8	Toowoomba	160,779	151,189	Darling Downs	
9	Cairns	156,900	156,170	Far North Queensland	
10	Redland	147,011	138,667	South East Queensland	
11	Mackay	114,970	112,797	Mackay	
12	Fraser Coast	101,503	95,310	Wide Bay–Burnett	
13	Bundaberg	92,894	89,813	Wide Bay–Burnett	
14	Rockhampton	79,726	109,337	Central Queensland	
15	Gladstone	61,642	57,892	Central Queensland	
16	Noosa	52,147		South East Queensland	Re-established 2014
17	Gympie	49,555	45,748	Wide Bay–Burnett	
18	Scenic Rim	40,078	36,457	South East Queensland	
19	Lockyer Valley	38,603	34,956	South East Queensland	
20	Livingstone	36,720		Mackay	Re-established 2014
21	Southern Downs	35,115	33,883	Darling Downs	
22	Whitsunday	33,782	31,427	Mackay	
23	Western Downs	33,444	31,591	Darling Downs	
24	South Burnett	32,186	31,029	Wide Bay–Burnett	
25	Cassowary Coast	28,725	27,667	Far North Queensland	
26	Central Highlands	28,002	28,175	Central Queensland	
27	Tablelands	24,830	43,728	Far North Queensland	
28	Somerset	24,593	21,641	South East Queensland	
29	Mareeba	21,554		Far North Queensland	Re-established 2014
30	Isaac	20,941	22,587	Mackay	
31	Mount Isa	18,668	21,238	North Queensland	
32	Burdekin	17,075	17,362	North Queensland	
33	Banana	14,315	14,455	Central Queensland	
34	Maranoa	12,664	13,074	Darling Downs	
35	Charters Towers	11,881	12,169	North Queensland	
36	Douglas	11,716		Far North Queensland	Re-established 2014
37	Hinchinbrook	10,884	11,568	North Queensland	
38	Goondiwindi	10,628	10,628	Darling Downs	
39	North Burnett	10,482	10,142	Wide Bay–Burnett	
40	Torres Strait Island	4,517	4,250	Far North Queensland	
41	Balonne	4,378	4,719	South West	
42	Murweh	4,309	4,617	South West	
43	Cook	4,222	4,153	Far North Queensland	
44	Weipa	3,907	3,332	Far North Queensland	
45	Longreach	3,663	4,188	Central Queensland	
46	Torres	3,612	3,259	Far North Queensland	
47	Cloncurry	3,031	3,228	North Queensland	
48	Barcaldine	2,863	3,215	Central Queensland	
49	Northern Peninsula Area	2,796	2,229	Far North Queensland	
50	Yarrabah	2,560	2,408	Far North Queensland	
51	Palm Island	2,443	2,339	North Queensland	
52	Carpentaria	1,958	2,054	Far North Queensland	
53	Blackall-Tambo	1,903	2,199	Central Queensland	
54	Paroo	1,642	1,858	South West	
55	Flinders	1,537	1,792	North Queensland	
56	Doomadgee	1,398	1,289	Far North Queensland	
57	Aurukun	1,275	1,295	Far North Queensland	
58	Cherbourg	1,266	1,223	Wide Bay Burnett	
59	Mornington	1,143	1,143	Far North Queensland	
60	Winton	1,128	1,337	Central Queensland	
61	Woorabinda	960	944	Central Queensland	
62	Napranum	955	856	Far North Queensland	
63	Kowanyama	944	1,030	Far North Queensland	
64	Hope Vale	919	983	Far North Queensland	
65	Quilpie	813	974	South West	
66	Etheridge	801	895	Far North Queensland	
67	McKinlay	796	1,048	North Queensland	
68	Richmond	787	827	North Queensland	
69	Pormpuraaw	753	663	Far North Queensland	
70	Lockhart River	714	482	Far North Queensland	
71	Boulia	425	481	Central Queensland	
72	Bulloo	352	405	South West	
73	Burke	328	513	Far North Queensland	
74	Mapoon	311	264	Far North Queensland	
75	Croydon	292	314	Far North Queensland	
76	Diamantina	287	283	Central Queensland	
77	Wujal Wujal	281	269	Far North Queensland	
78	Barcoo	271	352	Central Queensland	

== Regions by population ==
Rank	Region	Population (2011 census)	Largest city
1	South East Queensland	3,050,000	Brisbane
2	Wide Bay–Burnett	293,455	Bundaberg
3	Far North Queensland	275,058	Cairns
4	Darling Downs	241,537	Toowoomba
5	North Queensland	231,628	Townsville
6	Central Queensland	190,000	Mackay
7	Gulf Country	35,779	Mount Isa
8	South West Queensland	26,489	Roma
9	Central West Queensland	12,256	Longreach

== See also ==
- List of former local government areas of Queensland
- List of local government areas of Queensland
- List of cities in Australia by population
- List of places in New South Wales by population
- List of places in the Northern Territory by population
- List of places in South Australia by population
- List of places in Tasmania by population
- List of places in Victoria by population
- List of places in Western Australia by population
