= List of places in Western Australia by population =

Western Australia is the largest state of Australia, with an area of 2,527,013 square kilometres (975,685 sq mi), and its fourth most populous, with a population of 2,660,026 as of the 2021 Australian census. Official population statistics are created by the Australian Bureau of Statistics, who have a census every five years. The most recent census for which data has been released is the 2021 census.

== Urban centres by population ==
Urban centres are defined by the Australian Bureau of Statistics to be clusters with a population of 1,000 or higher of urban SA1's. SA1's are areas that subdivide all of Australia, and have a population between 200 and 800 people and an average population size of 400.

Rank	Urban centre	Region	Population				
Rank	Urban centre	Region	2001 census	2006 census	2011 census	2016 census	2021 census
1	Perth	Perth Metropolitan Region, Peel	1,162,716	1,256,035	1,627,576	1,874,578	2,043,762
2	Bunbury	South West	45,153	54,482	64,385	71,090	75,196
3	Geraldton	Mid West	25,324	27,420	31,349	31,982	32,717
4	Albany	Great Southern	22,256	25,196	26,643	29,373	31,128
5	Kalgoorlie-Boulder	Goldfields–Esperance	28,196	28,242	30,841	29,875	29,068
6	Busselton	South West	13,863	15,386	21,407	25,329	27,233
7	Karratha	Pilbara	10,730	11,728	16,475	15,828	17,013
8	Port Hedland	Pilbara	12,695	11,557	13,772	13,828	15,298
9	Broome	Kimberley	15,242	11,547	12,766	13,984	14,660
10	Yanchep	Perth Metropolitan Region	1,953	2,482	4,247	8,859	11,009
11	Esperance	Goldfields–Esperance	9,365	9,536	9,919	10,421	10,218
12	Margaret River	South West	3,627	4,415	5,314	6,392	7,430
13	Collie	South West	6,947	7,084	6,998	7,192	7,184
14	Dunsborough	South West	1,616	3,371	4,531	6,039	7,182
15	Northam	Wheatbelt	6,136	6,009	6,580	6,548	6,679
16	Kununurra	Kimberley	5,219	3,748	4,573	4,341	4,515
17	Newman	Pilbara	3,516	4,245	5,478	4,567	4,239
18	Carnarvon	Gascoyne	7,190	5,283	4,559	4,426	4,162
19	Manjimup	South West	4,392	4,239	4,164	4,213	4,138
20	Pinjarra	Peel	1,873	3,279	4,255	3,896	3,883
21	Narrogin	Wheatbelt	4,419	4,238	4,219	4,274	3,745
22	Katanning	Great Southern	3,676	3,808	3,745	3,702	3,641
23	Derby	Kimberley	3,662	3,093	3,261	3,325	3,009
24	Denmark	Great Southern	2,431	2,732	2,280	2,558	2,944
25	Tom Price	Pilbara	3,095	2,721	3,134	2,956	2,874
26	Two Rocks	Perth Metropolitan Region	1,508	1,628	1,853	2,269	2,853
27	Port Denison–Dongara	Mid West	2,202	2,343	2,764	2,782	2,841
28	Exmouth	Gascoyne	3,031	1,844	2,207	2,486	2,806
29	Harvey	South West	2,547	2,606	2,667	2,750	2,797
30	Donnybrook	South West	1,618	1,933	2,234	2,520	2,786
31	Capel	South West	1,415	1,464	1,865	2,020	2,402
32	York	Wheatbelt	2,014	2,088	2,387	2,548	2,399
33	Merredin	Wheatbelt	2,802	2,550	2,586	2,636	2,384
34	Waroona	Peel	1,770	1,864	2,157	2,397	2,368
35	Bridgetown	South West	2,099	2,324	1,515	1,448	2,300
36	Mundijong	Peel	806	877	1,429	1,484	2,284
37	Bullsbrook	Perth Metropolitan Region	1,145	1,206	1,255	1,887	2,225
38	Drummond Cove	Mid West	540	759	1,391	2,052	2,219
39	Cowaramup	South West	375	569	795	1,546	2,119
40	Wickham	Pilbara	1,724	1,825	1,651	1,572	2,016
41	Mount Barker	Great Southern	1,721	1,761	1,795	1,905	1,898
42	Kambalda West	Goldfields–Esperance	2,850	2,706	1,843	1,789	1,660
43	Little Grove	Great Southern	1,281	1,363	1,540	1,703	1,655
44	Halls Creek	Kimberley	1,264	1,211	1,443	1,546	1,605
45	Jurien Bay	Wheatbelt	1,143	1,173	1,261	1,425	1,600
46	Moora	Wheatbelt	1,716	1,605	1,650	1,577	1,591
47	Serpentine	Peel	327	763	1,089	1,265	1,485
48	Paraburdoo	Pilbara	1,202	1,607	1,509	1,359	1,319
49	Wagin	Wheatbelt	1,281	1,427	1,365	1,358	1,311
50	Dampier	Pilbara	1,469	1,370	1,341	1,104	1,282
51	Binningup	South West	745	950	1,010	1,227	1,271
52	Kalbarri	Mid West	2,125	1,332	1,277	1,349	1,270
53	Augusta	South West	1,091	1,068	1,022	1,109	1,211
54	Boddington–Ranford	Peel	968	928	1,107	1,147	1,129
55	Fitzroy Crossing	Kimberley	1,450	928	1,144	1,141	1,022

== Local government areas by population ==
Western Australia is divided into local government areas, who maintain roads, provide waste collection services, parks, libraries among other things. They are classified as either Cities, Towns of Shires, depending on population.

Rank	Local government area	Region	Population					
Rank	Local government area	Region	2011 census	Ref.	2016 census	Ref.	2021 census	Ref.
1	City of Stirling	Perth Metropolitan Region	195,702		210,208		226,369	
2	City of Wanneroo	Perth Metropolitan Region	152,077		188,212		209,111	
3	City of Joondalup	Perth Metropolitan Region	152,406		154,445		160,003	
4	City of Swan	Perth Metropolitan Region	108,461		133,851		152,974	
5	City of Rockingham	Perth Metropolitan Region	104,105		125,114		135,678	
6	City of Gosnells	Perth Metropolitan Region	106,585		118,073		126,376	
7	City of Cockburn	Perth Metropolitan Region	89,683		104,473		118,091	
8	City of Melville	Perth Metropolitan Region	95,700		98,083		103,523	
9	City of Canning	Perth Metropolitan Region	85,514		90,184		95,860	
10	City of Armadale	Perth Metropolitan Region	62,296		79,602		94,184	
11	City of Mandurah	Peel	69,903		80,813		90,306	
12	City of Bayswater	Perth Metropolitan Region	61,262		64,677		69,283	
13	City of Kalamunda	Perth Metropolitan Region	53,567		57,449		58,762	
14	City of Kwinana	Perth Metropolitan Region	29,227		38,918		45,867	
15	City of South Perth	Perth Metropolitan Region	40,739		41,989		43,405	
16	City of Belmont	Perth Metropolitan Region	35,209		39,682		42,257	
17	City of Busselton	South West	30,330		36,686		40,640	
18	City of Greater Geraldton	Mid West	–	–	38,634		39,489	
19	Shire of Mundaring	Perth Metropolitan Region	36,529		38,157		39,166	
20	City of Albany	Great Southern	33,650		36,583		38,763	
21	Town of Victoria Park	Perth Metropolitan Region	32,433		34,990		36,889	
22	City of Vincent	Perth Metropolitan Region	31,549		33,693		36,537	
23	City of Bunbury	South West	31,348		31,919		32,987	
24	City of Kalgoorlie–Boulder	Goldfields–Esperance	31,107		30,059		29,306	

== Regions by population ==

Western Australia is made up of nine regions, as well as the Perth Metropolitan Region.

Rank	Region	Population		Largest city
Rank	Region	2013 estimate	2020 estimate	Largest city
1	Perth Metropolitan Region	1,847,122	1,985,640	Perth
2	South West	170,000	181,801	Bunbury
3	Peel	124,500	146,239	Mandurah
4	Wheatbelt	75,000	73,690	Northam
5	Pilbara	66,300	62,841	Karratha
6	Great Southern	59,234	61,351	Albany
7	Goldfields–Esperance	61,900	53,914	Kalgoorlie–Boulder
8	Mid West	57,901	52,769	Geraldton
9	Kimberley	39,900	36,054	Broome
10	Gascoyne	9,899	9,262	Carnarvon

== See also ==
- Greater Perth
- List of cities in Australia by population
- List of places in New South Wales by population
- List of places in the Northern Territory by population
- List of places in Queensland by population
- List of places in South Australia by population
- List of places in Tasmania by population
- List of places in Victoria by population
- Local government areas of Western Australia
