= List of places in the Northern Territory by population =

Map of the Northern Territory within Australia

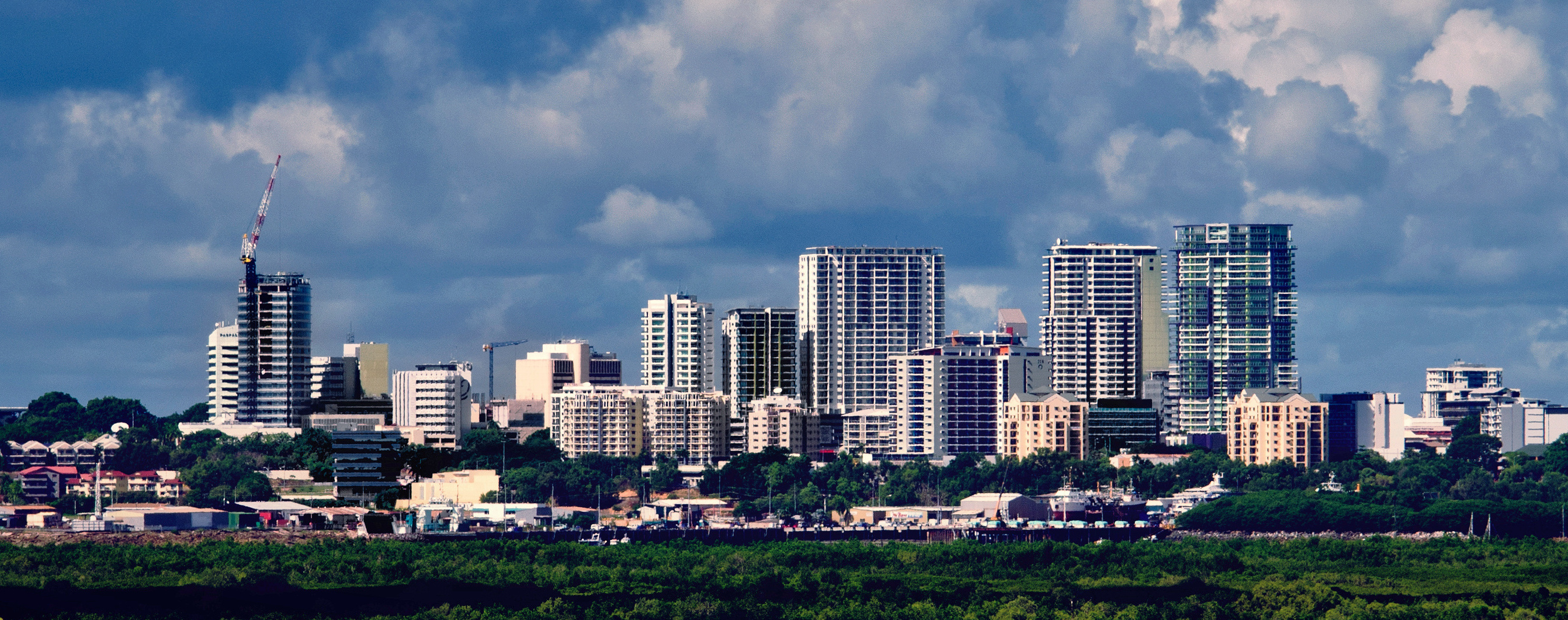
Darwin, the capital and largest city in the Northern Territory

The Northern Territory is a self-governing territory of Australia. It has a population of 232,605 as of the 2021 Australian census, the most recent census for which data has been released, and occupies an area of 1,347,791 square kilometres (520,385 sq mi). Official population statistics are published by the Australian Bureau of Statistics (ABS), which conducts a census every five years. The ABS publishes data for various types of geographic structures, including urban centres and localities, which represent the built-up area of cities and towns with more than 200 people, and local government areas.

== Urban centres and localities by population ==
Statistical Areas Level 1 (SA1s) are areas that subdivide all of Australia. SA1s generally have a population between 200 and 800 people, but this can reach as low as 180 for small towns and 90 for Aboriginal and Torres Strait Islander communities. Urban centres and localities (UCLs) are defined by the Australian Bureau of Statistics as clusters of urban SA1s. Clusters with a population higher than 1,000 are considered urban centres and clusters with a population between 200 and 999 are considered localities. The population of a locality is allowed to fall below 200 for two consecutive censuses before it is declassified as a locality.

The largest UCL within the Northern Territory is Darwin, with a population of 122,207 at the 2021 census. There are a total of 70 UCLs in the Northern Territory as of 2021, of which twelve have a population above 1,000.

List of urban centres and localities by population
Rank	Urban centre or locality	Population					
Rank	Urban centre or locality	2011 census	Ref.	2016 census	Ref.	2021 census	Ref.
1	Darwin	103,016		118,456		122,207	
2	Alice Springs	24,208		23,726		24,855	
3	Katherine	6,094		6,303		5,980	
4	Nhulunbuy	3,933		3,088		3,267	
5	Tennant Creek	3,062		2,991		2,949	
6	Maningrida	2,293		2,308		2,518	
7	Galiwinku	2,124		2,088		2,199	
8	Wadeye	2,112		2,280		1,924	
9	Wurrumiyanga (Nguiu)	1,527		1,563		1,421	
10	Gunbalanya (Oenpelli)	1,171		1,117		1,153	
11	Milingimbi	1,081		1,225		1,097	
12	Ngukurr	1,056		1,149		1,088	
13	Angurugu	835		855		883	
14	Yulara	888		759		853	
15	Ramingining	833		872		814	
16	Jabiru	1,129		1,081		755	
17	Borroloola	926		871		755	
18	Alyangula	986		873		751	
19	Yuendumu	687		759		740	
20	Gapuwiyak	874		923		705	
21	Numbulwar	687		723		681	
22	Humpty Doo	569		678		660	
23	Yirrkala	843		809		657	
24	Lajamanu	656		598		653	
25	Minyerri	484		618		650	
26	Santa Teresa (Ltyentye Purte)	555		580		603	
27	Daguragu – Kalkarindji	542		575		575	
28	Howard Springs	612		595		569	
29	Hermannsburg	625		605		551	
30	Wugular (Beswick)	511		531		542	
31	Ampilatwatja	365		418		439	
32	Papunya	418		404		438	
33	Warruwi	423		389		432	
34	Ilparpa	433		360		424	
35	Wagait Beach – Mandorah	368		461		422	
36	Walungurru (Kintore)	454		410		420	
37	Umbakumba	441		503		419	
38	Milikapiti	447		401		414	
39	Ali Curung	535		494		394	
40	Batchelor	336		466		371	
41	Nganmarriyanga (Palumpa)	377		390		364	
42	Alpurrurulam	441		420		350	
43	Nauiyu Nambiyu (Daly River)	454		378		350	
44	Barunga	313		363		337	
45	Mataranka	244		310		327	
46	Pine Creek	380		328		318	
47	Pirlangimpi	371		371		317	
48	Mutitjulu	210		323		296	
49	Elliot	348		339		287	
50	Yarralin	266		293		283	
51	Timber Creek	—N/a (Note: Timber Creek, Gunyangara, Atitjere and Aputula (Finke) were not UCLs at the 2011 census.)		249		278	
52	Minjilang	309		247		265	
53	Jilkminggan	280		301		263	
54	Bulman – Weemol	291		280		263	
55	Nyirripi	210		236		251	
56	Adelaide River	237		265		243	
57	Gunyangara	—N/a		240		241	
58	Binjari	238		190		240	
59	Areyonga	235		195		236	
60	Amoonguna	275		239		229	
61	Kaltukatjara (Docker River)	295		394		229	
62	Willowra	221		301		222	
63	Atitjere	—N/a		224		204	
64	Titjikala	201		227		196	
65	Aputula (Finke)	—N/a		192		191	
66	Laramba	251		239		189	
67	Robinson River (Mungoorbada)	258		222		180	
68	Yuelamu	207		220		149	
69	Canteen Creek	217		184		147	
70	Wutunugurra	207		166		143	

== Local government areas by population ==
The Northern Territory is divided into 17 local government areas plus several unincorporated areas. Local government area boundaries are set by an independent local government representation review committee, which consists of the Northern Territory's electoral commissioner, surveyor-general, and the chief executive officer of the Local Government Association of the Northern Territory. The Australian Bureau of Statistics uses an approximation of these boundaries for its statistics. The largest local government area within the Northern Territory is the City of Darwin, with a population of 80,530 as of the 2021 census.

List of local government areas by population
Rank	Local government area	Population					
Rank	Local government area	2011 census	Ref.	2016 census	Ref.	2021 census	Ref.
1	City of Darwin	72,930		78,804		80,530	
2	City of Palmerston	27,703		33,786		37,247	
3	Town of Alice Springs	25,186		24,753		25,912	
4	Litchfield Municipality	18,994		23,855		21,411	
5	Town of Katherine	9,187		9,717		9,643	
6	East Arnhem Region	9,098		9,026		8,778	
*	Unincorporated areas (Note: Unincorporated areas are not ranked.)	8,089		6,907		6,802	
7	Roper Gulf Region	6,121		6,505		6,486	
8	Barkly Region	6,823		6,655		6,316	
9	West Arnhem Region	6,232		6,188		6,281	
10	MacDonnell Region	5,831		6,029		5,748	
11	Central Desert Region	3,720		3,677		3,591	
12	West Daly Region (Note: On 1 July 2014, the West Daly Region split away from the Victoria Daly Region.)	—N/a		3,166		2,973	
13	Victoria Daly Region	5,924		2,810		2,815	
14	Tiwi Islands Region	2,580		2,453		2,348	
15	Coomalie Shire	1,106		1,319		1,276	
16	Wagait Shire	369		463		423	
*	Darwin Waterfront Precinct (Note: The Darwin Waterfront Precinct was included with the other unincorporated areas in the 2011 and 2016 censuses.)	—N/a		—N/a		293	
17	Belyuen Shire	181		164		149	

== See also ==
- List of cities in Australia by population
- List of places in New South Wales by population
- List of places in Queensland by population
- List of places in South Australia by population
- List of places in Tasmania by population
- List of places in Victoria by population
- List of places in Western Australia by population
