= List of places in Tasmania by population =

Map of Tasmania within Australia

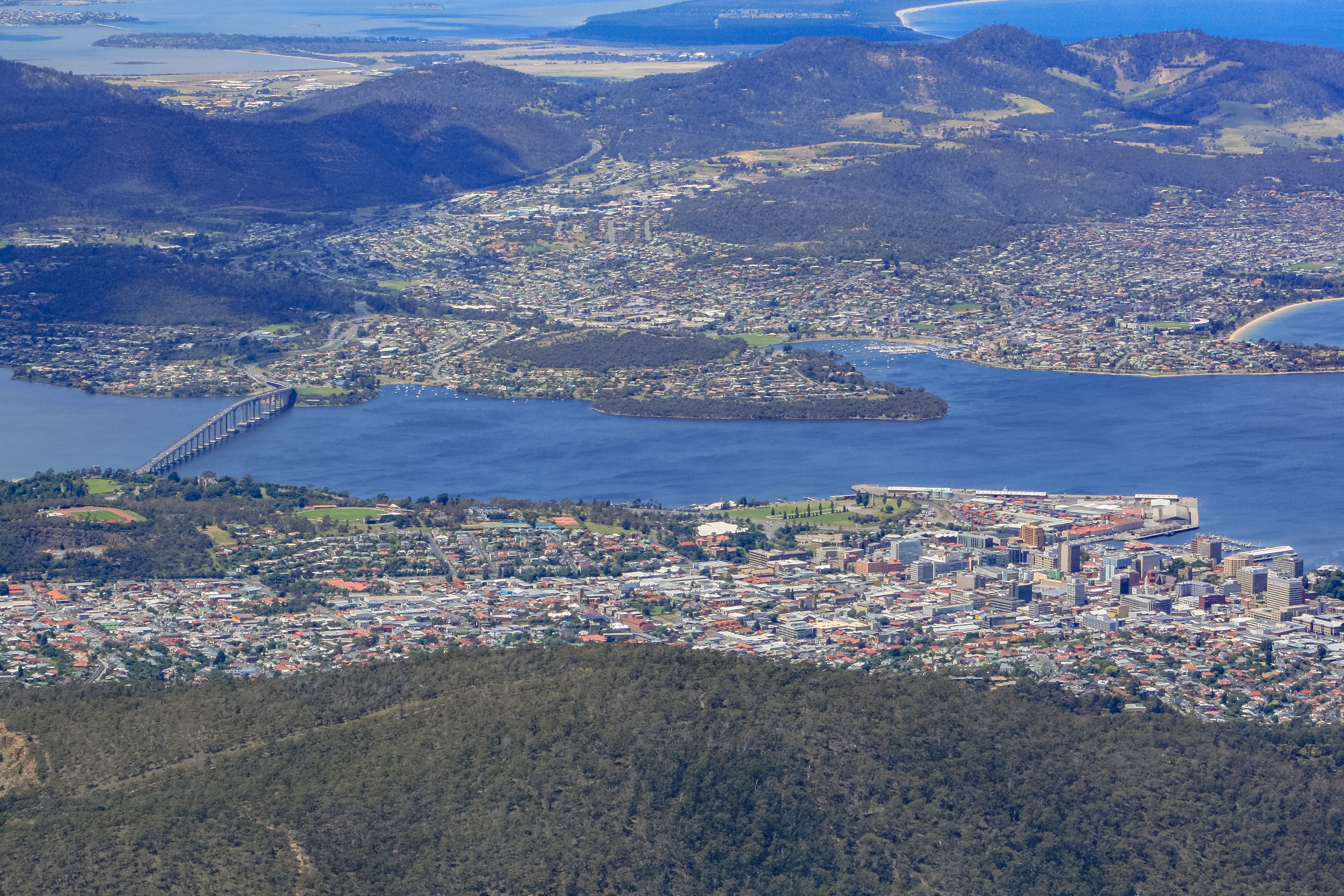
Hobart, the capital and largest urban area in Tasmania

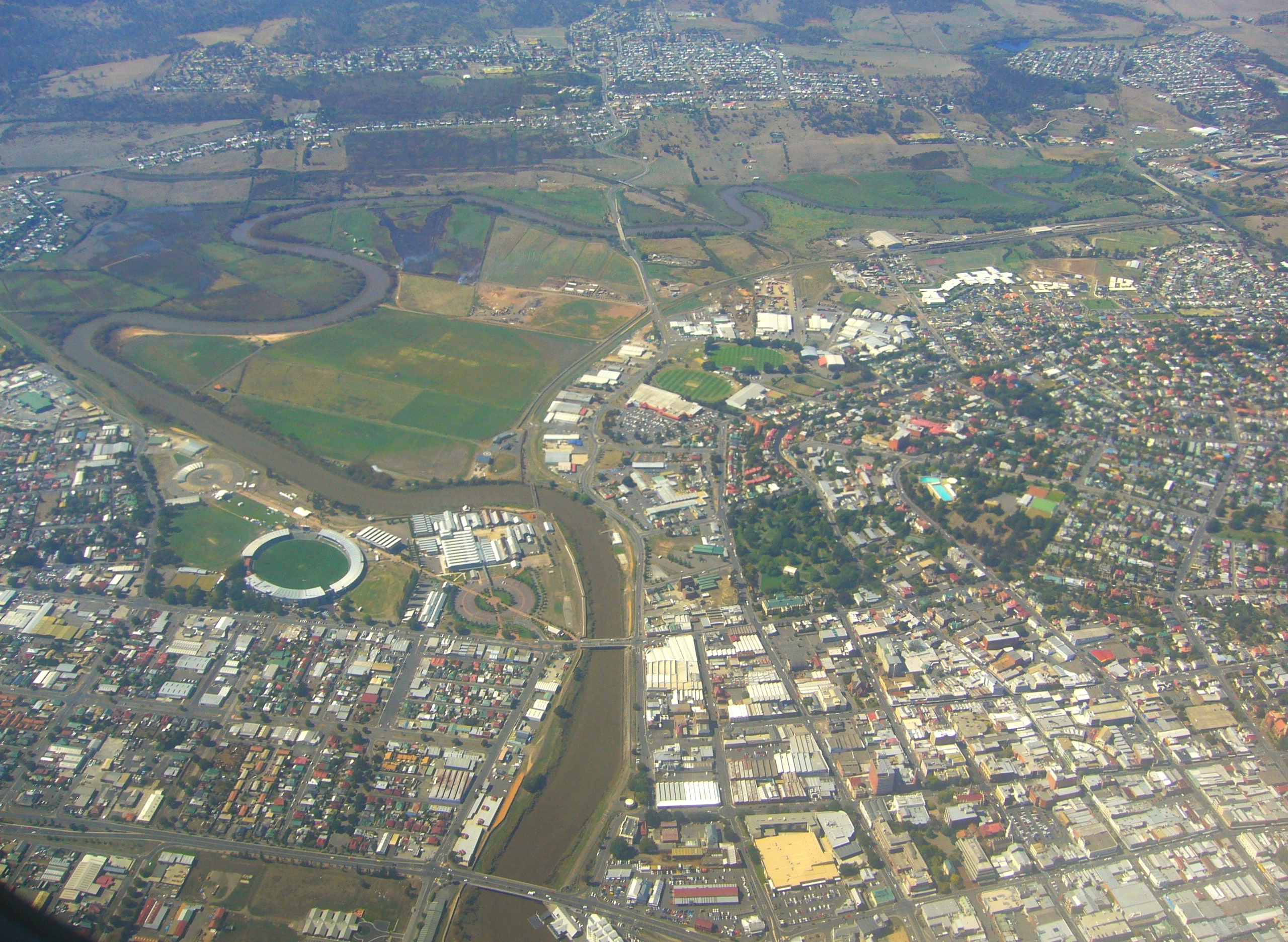
Launceston

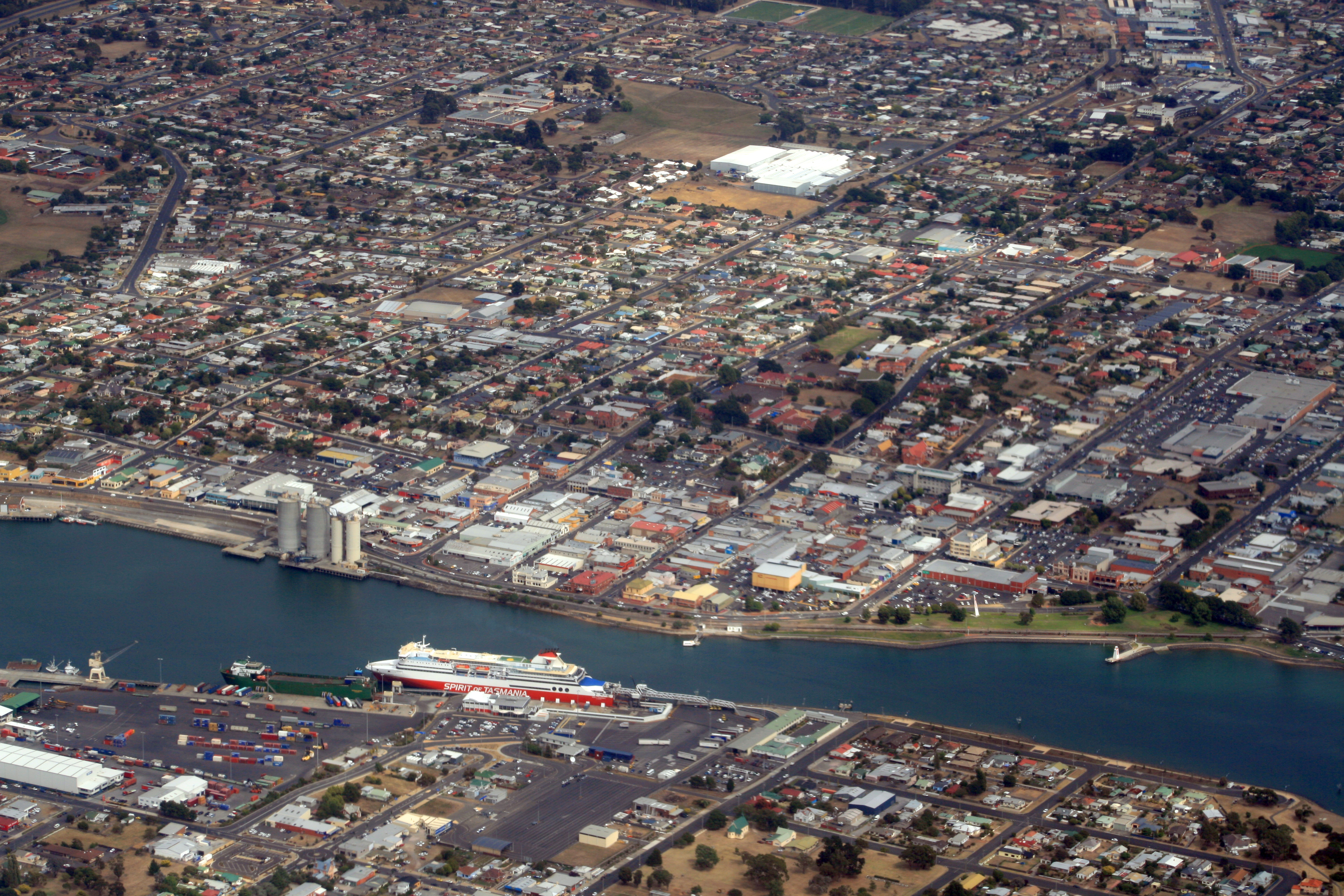
Devonport

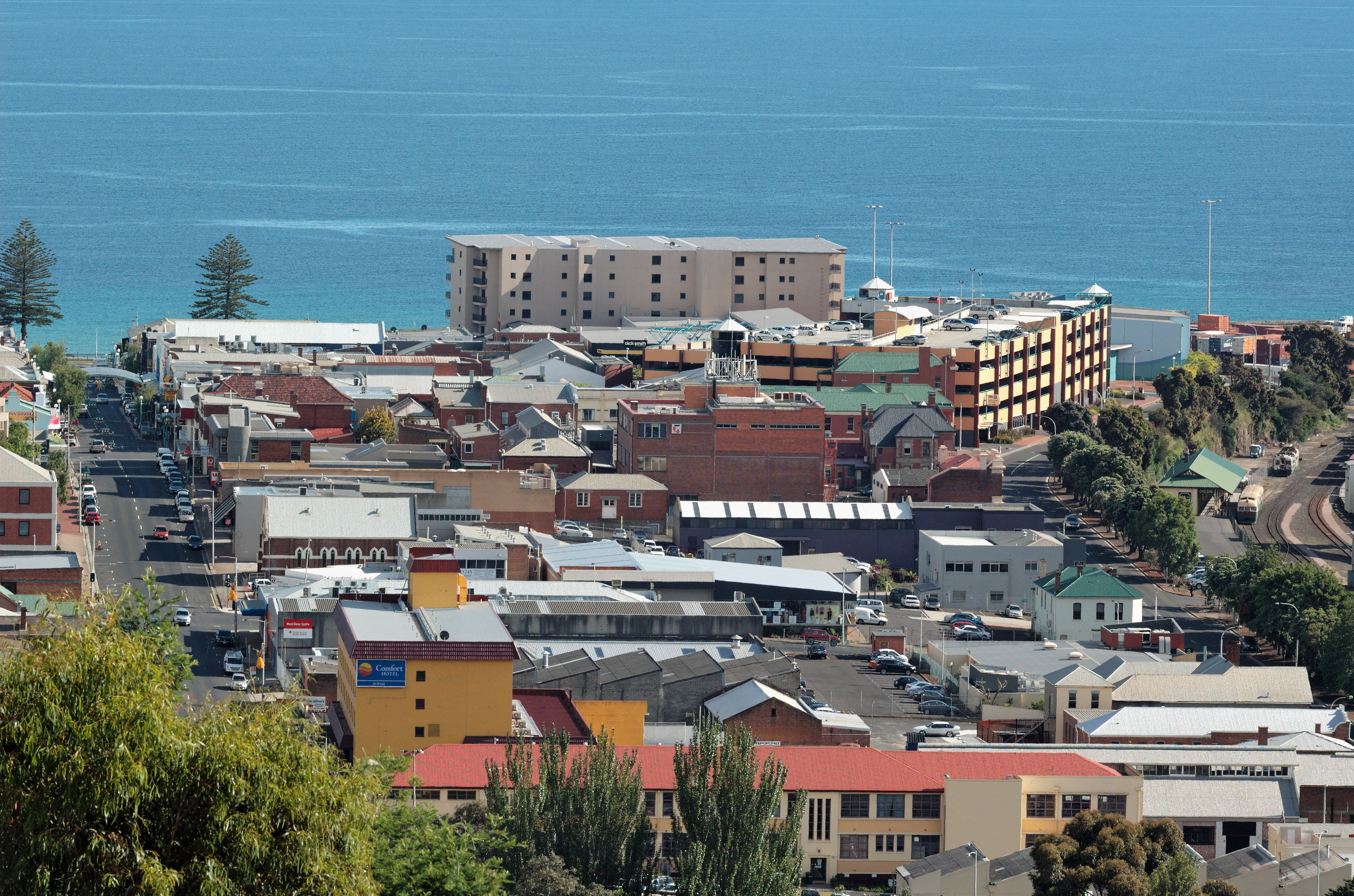
Burnie

Tasmania is the smallest Australian state, with a population of 557,571 as of the 2021 Australian census and an area of 68,401 square kilometres (26,410 sq mi). Official population statistics are published by the Australian Bureau of Statistics (ABS), which conducts a census every five years, the most recent for which data is released being the 2021 census. The ABS publishes data for various types of geographic structures, including significant urban areas, which represent towns and cities with a population of 10,000 or higher, urban centres and localities, which represent the built-up area of cities and towns with more than 200 people, and local government areas.

== Significant urban areas by population ==
Statistical Areas Level 2 (SA2s) are areas that subdivide all of Australia and generally have a population between 3,000 and 25,000 people, with an average of 10,000. Significant urban areas (SUAs) are defined by the Australian Bureau of Statistics as clusters of urban SA2s, and are designed to represent towns and cities with a population of 10,000 or more.

The largest SUA within Tasmania is Hobart, with a population of 226,653 at the 2021 census. There are a total of five SUAs in Tasmania as of 2021.

List of significant urban areas by population
Rank	Significant urban area	Population					
Rank	Significant urban area	2011 census	Ref.	2016 census	Ref.	2021 census	Ref.
1	Hobart	200,501		204,010		226,653	
2	Launceston	82,220		84,153		90,953	
3	Devonport	29,051		29,381		31,721	
4	Burnie – Somerset (Note: Known as Burnie – Wynyard in the 2011 and 2016 censuses.)	26,869		26,490		27,826	
5	Ulverstone	14,109		14,151		15,086	

== Urban centres and localities by population ==
Statistical Areas Level 1 (SA1s) are areas that subdivide all of Australia and generally have a population between 200 and 800 people, but this can reach as low as 180 for small towns. Urban centres and localities (UCLs) are defined by the Australian Bureau of Statistics as clusters of urban SA1s. Clusters with a population higher than 1,000 are considered urban centres and clusters with a population between 200 and 999 are considered localities. The population of a locality is allowed to fall below 200 for two consecutive censuses before it is declassified as a locality.

The largest UCL within Tasmania is Hobart, with a population of 197,451 at the 2021 census, making Tasmania Australia's least centralised state. There are a total of 94 UCLs in Tasmania as of 2021, of which 37 have a population above 1,000.

List of urban centres and localities by population
Rank	Urban centre or locality	Population					
Rank	Urban centre or locality	2011 census	Ref.	2016 census	Ref.	2021 census	Ref.
1	Hobart	170,975		178,009		197,451	
2	Launceston	74,085		75,329		80,943	
3	Devonport	22,770		23,046		24,591	
4	Burnie – Somerset	19,819		19,385		20,267	
5	Ulverstone	12,110		12,032		12,723	
6	New Norfolk	5,543		5,834		6,153	
7	Wynyard	5,061		5,168		5,387	
8	Dodges Ferry – Lewisham	4,445		4,621		5,219	
9	Latrobe	3,354		3,474		4,456	
10	George Town	4,304		4,257		4,408	
11	Legana	2,915		3,243		4,252	
12	Port Sorell	2,853		3,358		3,869	
13	Longford	3,053		3,347		3,711	
14	Midway Point	2,598		2,859		3,384	
15	Penguin	3,159		3,138		3,330	
16	Smithton	3,240		3,275		3,282	
17	Perth	2,411		2,623		3,233	
18	Sorell	2,110		2,540		3,180	
19	Deloraine	2,333		2,432		2,631	
20	Margate	2,107		2,302		2,572	
21	Hadspen	2,062		2,216		2,337	
22	Huonville	1,741		1,840		2,071	
23	Scottsdale	1,899		1,905		1,979	
24	Snug	764		1,560		1,843	
25	Queenstown	1,975		1,755		1,772	
26	Westbury	1,476		1,473		1,666	
27	St Helens	1,498		1,449		1,573	
28	Bridport	1,248		1,266		1,371	
29	Beauty Point	1,205		1,171		1,231	
30	Primrose Sands	934		1,050		1,209	
31	Sheffield	1,108		1,127		1,195	
32	Beaconsfield	1,008		1,054		1,093	
33	Exeter	389		387		1,092	
34	Evandale	1,086		1,124		1,058	
35	Ranelagh	687		874		1,058	
36	Cygnet	844		929		1,057	
37	Grindelwald	828		965		1,037	
38	Richmond	887		858		934	
39	Railton	883		835		887	
40	Campbell Town	781		834		823	
41	Bicheno	647		740		797	
42	Fern Tree	667		726		763	
43	Rosebery	922		708		749	
44	Stieglitz	643		693		724	
45	Triabunna	766		749		722	
46	Howden	658		676		717	
47	Swansea	597		645		711	
48	Zeehan	728		698		702	
49	South Arm	576		612		691	
50	Cressy	676		669		668	
51	Currie	687		665		659	
52	Geeveston	631		616		658	
53	Gravelly Beach	561		567		641	
54	Scamander	543		515		639	
55	Strahan	660		658		634	
56	Sulphur Creek	503		561		631	
57	Orford	518		537		623	
58	Clifton Beach	555		588		618	
59	Campania	284		395		608	
60	Electrona	474		538		601	
61	Cremorne	461		507		577	
62	Oatlands	552		544		562	
63	Dover	441		486		521	
64	Low Head	440		472		507	
65	Stanley	481		476		504	
66	Carrick	450		432		503	
67	Bagdad	406		465		501	
68	St Marys	511		465		494	
69	Sisters Beach	439		391		481	
70	Hillwood	440		429		454	
71	Franklin	326		337		444	
72	Kettering	308		356		408	
73	Ridgley	382		389		401	
74	Forth	378		368		398	
75	Bracknell	375		367		392	
76	Eaglehawk Neck	338		356		391	
77	Opossum Bay	328		329		383	
78	Bothwell	391		356		379	
79	Kempton	353		344		371	
80	Nubeena	274		290		362	
81	Fingal	366		336		350	
82	Heybridge	307		314		339	
83	Dilston	307		291		316	
84	Lilydale	274		277		307	
85	White Beach	286		271		305	
86	Dunalley	274		272		304	
87	Swan Point	278		282		300	
88	Ross	271		276		291	
89	Gawler	250		252		277	
90	Binalong Bay	210		208		247	
91	Waratah	248		219		235	
92	Mole Creek	230		188		216	
93	Tullah	192		159		196	
94	Collinsvale	249		263		186	

== Local government areas by population ==
Tasmania is divided into 29 local government areas. The current boundaries were set by the Local Government Act 1993, with only minor changes since then. The Australian Bureau of Statistics uses an approximation of these boundaries for its statistics. The largest local government area within Tasmania is the City of Launceston, with a population of 70,055 as of the 2021 census.

List of local government areas by population
Rank	Local government area	Population					
Rank	Local government area	2011 census	Ref.	2016 census	Ref.	2021 census	Ref.
1	City of Launceston	64,193		65,274		70,055	
2	City of Clarence	51,852		54,819		61,531	
3	City of Hobart	48,703		50,439		55,077	
4	City of Glenorchy	44,656		46,253		50,411	
5	Kingborough Council	33,893		35,853		40,082	
6	City of Devonport	24,615		24,696		26,150	
7	West Tamar Council	21,817		22,718		25,145	
8	Central Coast Council	21,355		21,362		22,760	
9	Meander Valley Council	18,888		19,282		20,709	
10	City of Burnie	19,329		18,895		19,918	
11	Brighton Council	15,460		16,512		18,995	
12	Huon Valley Council	15,140		16,199		18,259	
13	Sorell Council	13,194		14,414		16,734	
14	Waratah–Wynyard Council	13,708		13,578		14,300	
15	Northern Midlands Council	12,228		12,822		13,745	
16	Latrobe Council	9,833		10,699		12,420	
17	Derwent Valley Council	9,704		10,021		10,942	
18	Circular Head Council	7,977		7,926		8,117	
19	George Town Council	6,636		6,764		7,033	
20	Dorset Council	6,827		6,617		6,829	
21	Break O'Day Council	6,194		6,104		6,770	
22	Southern Midlands Council	6,049		6,043		6,662	
23	Kentish Council	6,086		6,128		6,603	
24	Glamorgan–Spring Bay Council	4,190		4,400		5,012	
25	West Coast Council	4,678		4,149		4,263	
26	Tasman Council	2,355		2,372		2,593	
27	Central Highlands Council	2,262		2,141		2,520	
28	King Island Council	1,566		1,585		1,617	
29	Flinders Council	776		906		922	

== See also ==
- List of cities in Australia by population
- List of places in New South Wales by population
- List of places in the Northern Territory by population
- List of places in Queensland by population
- List of places in South Australia by population
- List of places in Victoria by population
- List of places in Western Australia by population
