= List of places in Victoria by population =

This is a list of places in the Australian state of Victoria by population.

== Methodology ==
The figures below broadly represent the populations of the contiguous built-up area of each city or town as defined by the Australian Bureau of Statistics. The population figures are drawn from the Australian Census Urban Centres and Localities data, where an "urban centre" is defined as a population cluster of 1,000 or more people. Some urban centres include neighbouring towns; for example, the Mildura population in the table below includes Irymple.

== Data from the most recent census ==
2021 rank	Urban centre	2021 census population
1	Melbourne	4,585,537
2	Geelong	180,239
3	Ballarat	105,348
4	Bendigo	100,649
5	Melton (Melbourne)	76,346
6	Shepparton - Mooroopna	49,862
7	Sunbury (Melbourne)	38,010
8	Wodonga	37,839
9	Mildura	35,652
10	Warrnambool	32,894
11	Traralgon	27,628
12	Torquay - Jan Juc	22,998
13	Ocean Grove - Barwon Heads	22,035
14	Bacchus Marsh	21,692
15	Wangaratta	19,712
16	Warragul	19,134
17	Horsham	16,289
18	Drysdale - Clifton Springs	16,199
19	Lara	15,772
20	Moe - Newborough	15,758
21	Drouin	14,764
22	Wallan	14,741
23	Sale	14,100
24	Morwell	14,068
25	Echuca	13,764
26	Bairnsdale	13,734
27	Colac	12,348
28	Leopold	12,319
29	Gisborne	10,999
30	Swan Hill	10,869
31	Castlemaine	10,577
32	Portland	10,450
33	Benalla	9,742
34	Hamilton	9,577
35	Portarlington - St Leonards	9,048
36	Kilmore	8,786
37	Healesville	8,698
38	Yarrawonga	8,580
39	Wonthaggi	8,430
40	Maryborough	7,769
41	Ararat	7,015
42	Cowes	6,797
43	Lakes Entrance	6,527
44	Bannockburn	6,178
45	Inverloch	6,046
46	Seymour	6,016
47	Kyabram	6,010
48	Stawell	5,627
49	Leongatha	5,618
50	Whittlesea	5,497

== Historical data series ==
This table lists urban centres that have appeared in the top 50 in at least one census since 2001.

Urban centre	2001 census		2006 census		2011 census		2016 census		2021 census	
Urban centre	Rank	Population	Rank	Population	Rank	Population	Rank	Population	Rank	Population
Melbourne	1	3,160,171	1	3,375,341	1	3,707,530	1	4,196,201	1	4,585,537
Geelong	2	129,668	2	135,965	2	143,921	2	157,103	2	180,239
Ballarat	3	72,766	3	77,766	3	85,936	3	93,761	3	105,348
Bendigo	4	68,480	4	75,420	4	82,795	4	92,384	4	100,649
Melton (Melbourne)	6	32,007	6	35,194	5 ▲	45,625	5	54,455	5	76,346
Shepparton - Mooroopna	5	35,754	5	38,247	6 ▼	42,742	6	46,194	6	49,862
Pakenham (Melbourne)	19	11,283	12 ▲	18,621	8 ▲	32,913	–	N/A (Note: Due to increased residential development in Officer, which previously provided a non-urban buffer between Pakenham and the rest of the Melbourne metropolitan area, Pakenham began to be counted as part of the greater Melbourne urban centre starting from the 2016 census.)	–	N/A
Sunbury (Melbourne)	10	25,086	9 ▲	29,071	7 ▲	33,062	8 ▼	34,425	7 ▲	38,010
Wodonga	8	27,659	8	29,538	9 ▼	31,605	7 ▲	35,131	8 ▼	37,839
Mildura	7	27,963	7	30,761	10 ▼	31,363	9 ▲	33,445	9	35,652
Warrnambool	9	26,669	10 ▼	28,015	11 ▼	29,286	10 ▲	30,707	10	32,894
Traralgon	11	19,569	11	21,474	12 ▼	24,590	11 ▲	25,482	11	27,628
Torquay - Jan Juc	30	7,943 (Note: This figure is for Torquay only.)	29 ▲	9,463	19 ▲	13,336	15 ▲	16,942	12 ▲	22,998
Ocean Grove - Barwon Heads	17	12,582	16 ▲	13,701	14 ▲	16,091	13 ▲	18,208	13	22,035
Bacchus Marsh	18	12,107	19 ▼	13,046	17 ▲	14,914	14 ▲	17,303	14	21,692
Wangaratta	12	16,310	13 ▼	16,732	13	17,376	12	18,567	15 ▼	19,712
Warragul	22	10,405	21 ▲	11,333	20 ▲	13,081	18 ▲	14,274	16 ▲	19,134
Horsham	15	13,210	15	13,945	16 ▼	15,261	16	15,630	17 ▼	16,289
Drysdale - Clifton Springs	28	9,033	25 ▲	9,880	26 ▼	10,929	24 ▲	12,483	18 ▲	16,199
Lara	26	9,185	24 ▲	10,312	25 ▼	11,192	21 ▲	13,327	19 ▲	15,772
Moe - Newborough	13	15,352 (Note: This figure is for Moe - Yallourn.)	14 ▼	15,159	15 ▼	15,293	17 ▼	15,062	20 ▼	15,758
Drouin	40	5,800	36 ▲	6,656	30 ▲	9,369	26 ▲	11,889	21 ▲	14,764
Wallan	50	3,958	45 ▲	5,321	36 ▲	7,810	34 ▲	8,521	22 ▲	14,741
Sale	16	12,793	18 ▼	13,090	21 ▼	12,764	20 ▲	13,507	23 ▼	14,100
Morwell	14	13,505	17 ▼	13,399	18 ▼	13,689	19 ▼	13,540	24 ▼	14,068
Echuca	20	10,926	20	12,399	22 ▼	12,611	23 ▲	12,902	25 ▼	13,764
Bairnsdale	21	10,557	22 ▼	11,033	23 ▼	11,820	22 ▲	12,950	26 ▼	13,734
Colac	23	10,164	23	10,560	24 ▼	11,416	25 ▼	11,890	27 ▼	12,348
Leopold	35	6,722	31 ▲	7,937	29 ▲	9,608	27 ▲	11,882	28 ▼	12,319
Gisborne	46	4,228	38 ▲	6,285	34 ▲	8,056	31 ▲	9,822	29 ▲	10,999
Swan Hill	24	9,738	27 ▼	9,705	28 ▼	9,876	28	10,603	30 ▼	10,869
Castlemaine	34	6,822	34	7,082	33 ▲	9,124	30 ▲	9,933	31 ▼	10,577
Portland	25	9,566	26 ▼	9,708	27 ▼	9,959	29 ▼	10,059	32 ▼	10,450
Benalla	29	8,593	30 ▼	8,951	32 ▼	9,328	32	9,296	33 ▼	9,742
Hamilton	27	9,119	28 ▼	9,493	31 ▼	9,344	33 ▼	8,892	34 ▼	9,577
Portarlington - St Leonards	44	4,677 (Note: This figure is the sum of the populations of Portarlington, Indented Head and St Leonards, which were treated as three neighbouring but distinct urban centres prior to the 2016 census.)	47 ▼	4,947	42 ▲	6,069	41 ▲	6,883	35 ▲	9,048
Kilmore	55	3,521	48 ▲	4,699	41 ▲	6,142	39 ▲	6,953	36 ▲	8,786
Healesville	32	7,132	33 ▼	7,216	35 ▼	7,992	35	8,483	37 ▼	8,698
Yarrawonga	49	4,016	43 ▲	5,727	40 ▲	6,793	37 ▲	7,847	38 ▼	8,580
Wonthaggi	37	6,136	37	6,362	37	7,279	36 ▲	7,917	39 ▼	8,430
Maryborough	31	7,471	32 ▼	7,549	38 ▼	7,174	38	7,495	40 ▼	7,769
Ararat	33	7,043	35 ▼	7,066	39 ▼	7,023	40 ▼	6,924	41 ▼	7,015
Cowes	56	3,494	52 ▲	4,137	52	4,310	50 ▲	4,944	42 ▲	6,797
Lakes Entrance	42	5,476	42	5,644	43 ▼	5,967	42 ▲	6,071	43 ▼	6,527
Bannockburn	106	1,518	79 ▲	2,426	61 ▲	3,512	49 ▲	4,997	44 ▲	6,178
Inverloch	53	3,737	57 ▼	3,532	51 ▲	4,456	48 ▲	5,066	45 ▲	6,046
Seymour	36	6,441	40 ▼	5,915	44 ▼	5,915	44	5,842	46 ▼	6,016
Kyabram	41	5,527	44 ▼	5,378	46 ▼	5,643	43 ▲	5,899	47 ▼	6,010
Stawell	39	6,142	41 ▼	5,755	45 ▼	5,737	45	5,521	48 ▼	5,627
Leongatha	47	4,220	50 ▼	4,306	48 ▲	4,894	47 ▲	5,117	49 ▼	5,618
Whittlesea		2,370	62 ▲	3,412	55 ▲	3,952	56 ▼	3,917	50 ▲	5,497
Cobram	45	4,543	46 ▼	4,995	47 ▼	5,420	46 ▲	5,376	51 ▼	5,389
Kyneton	48	4,121	51 ▼	4,176	50 ▲	4,461	51 ▼	4,866	53 ▼	5,151
Churchill	43	4,898	49 ▼	4,568	49	4,750	52 ▼	4,567	56 ▼	4,679

== Gallery ==
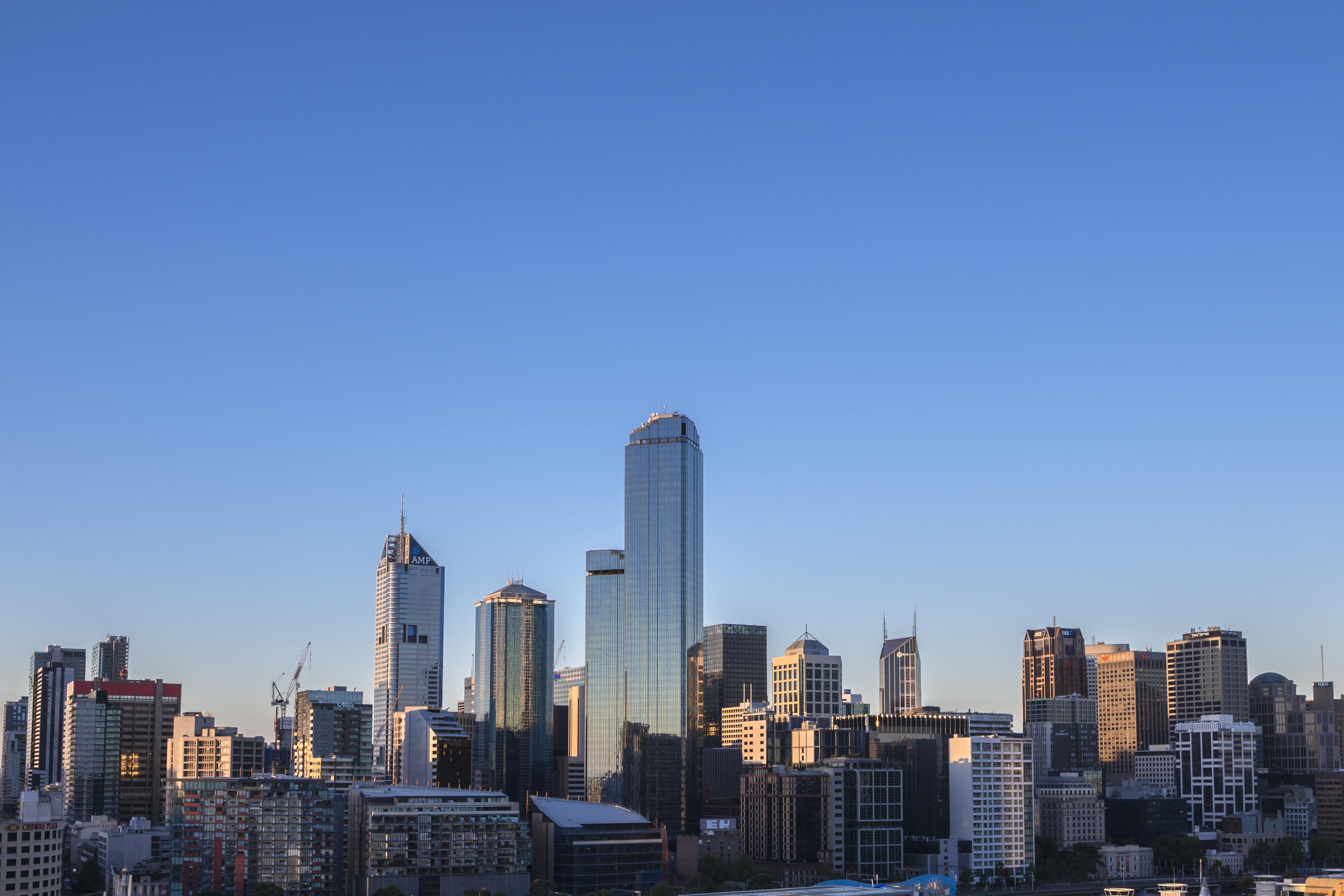
Melbourne, the most populated city in Victoria.

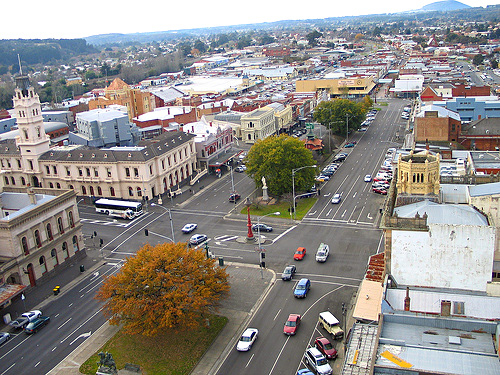
Looking east over Sturt Street and the CBD toward Bridge Mall from Ballarat Town Hall clock tower

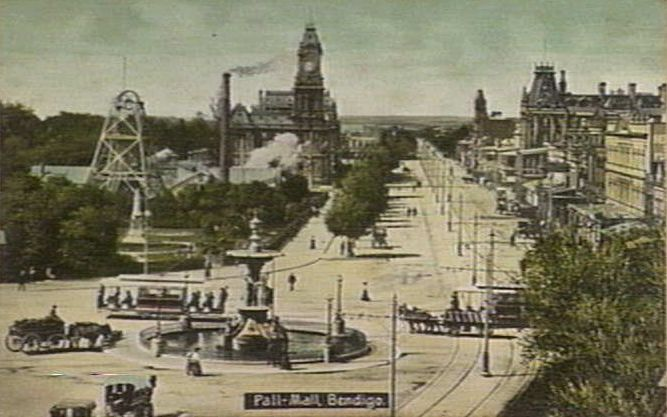
Pall Mall and Charing Cross in 1909. Bendigo had become a bustling city with a large transport network.

== See also ==
- Demographics of Australia
- List of cities in Australia
- List of places in New South Wales by population
- List of places in the Northern Territory by population
- List of places in Queensland by population
- List of places in South Australia by population
- List of places in Tasmania by population
- List of places in Western Australia by population
