= Allingham =

Allingham is a surname. Notable people with the surname include:

- Cedric Allingham, fictional British writer of a 1954 book in which he claimed to have encountered the pilot of a Martian spacecraft
- Helen Allingham (1848–1926), British watercolourist and illustrator
- Henry Allingham (1896–2009), English supercentenarian, World War I veteran and briefly the world's oldest living man
- Herbert Allingham (1867–1936), English editor and writer
- Herbert William Allingham (1862–1904), British surgeon
- John Till Allingham (1776–1812), English dramatist
- Margery Allingham (1904–1966), English crime writer
- Maurice Allingham (1896–1993), Australian rules footballer
- Michael Allingham (born 1943), British economist
- Mike Allingham (born 1965), Scottish cricketer
- William Allingham (1824–1889), Irish man of letters and poet

Places:

- Allingham, Queensland, town in Australia
