= List of places in New South Wales by population =

This is a list of cities and towns in the Australian state of New South Wales with a population of 5,000 or greater as at the 2021 Census. The below figures represent the populations of the contiguous built-up areas of each city or town.

Rank	Urban centre	Population					Region
Rank	Urban centre	2001 census	2006 census	2011 census	2016 census	2021 census	Region
1	Sydney	3,455,110	3,641,422 (Note: In the 2006 census, the Blue Mountains city was counted as a part of Sydney.)	3,908,642	4,321,535	4,698,656	Greater Sydney
2	Newcastle	278,773	288,732	308,308	322,278	348,539	Hunter
3	Central Coast	254,579	282,726	297,713	307,742	325,255	Central Coast
4	Wollongong	227,522	234,482	245,942	261,896	280,153	Illawarra-Shoalhaven
5	Maitland	53,391	61,431	67,132	78,015	89,597	Hunter
6	Tweed Heads	44,655	51,788 (Note: The large increase in population seen here is partly due to the inclusion of the previously separate area of Bogangar.)	55,553	59,776	63,721	Northern Rivers
7	Albury	42,005	43,787	45,627	47,974	53,677	Riverina
8	Coffs Harbour	25,828	26,353	45,580 (Note: The large increase in population here is mostly due to the urban area of Coffs Harbour expanding to incorporate the previously separate area of Sawtell.)	48,225	51,069	Mid North Coast
9	Wagga Wagga	44,272 (Note: In 2001 and 2006, Estella was counted as a suburb of Wagga Wagga and not as a separate entity.)	46,735	46,913	48,263	49,686	Riverina
10	Port Macquarie	37,696	39,219	41,491	44,814	47,793	Mid North Coast
11	Orange	31,923	31,544	34,992	37,182	40,127	Central West
12	Dubbo	30,860	30,574	32,327	34,339	38,783	Orana
13	Queanbeyan	29,752	34,084	35,878	36,348	37,511	Southern Highlands
14	Bathurst	26,920	28,992	31,294	33,587	36,230	Central West
15	Tamworth	32,440	33,475	36,131	33,885 (Note: The drop in population seen here is largely a result of Tamworth's boundaries changing to no longer include Calala.)	35,415	New England
16	Nowra - Bomaderry	24,700	27,478	27,988	30,853	33,583	Illawarra-Shoalhaven
17	Blue Mountains	28,126	—	28,769	29,319	30,049	Greater Sydney
18	Lismore	27,193	27,069	27,474	27,569	27,916	Northern Rivers
19	Goulburn	20,846	20,127	21,484	22,419	23,963	Southern Highlands
20	Bowral - Mittagong	16,582	18,953	19,726	21,394	23,762	Southern Highlands
21	Cessnock	17,791	18,316	20,013	21,725	23,211	Hunter
22	Morisset - Cooranbong	— (Note: For 2001 and 2006, the urban area of Morisset-Cooranbong was not defined by the Australian government.)		16,918	18,741	22,150	Hunter
23	Armidale	20,068	19,485	19,818	20,386	21,312	New England
24	Griffith	15,937	16,182	17,616	18,874	20,799	Riverina
25	Forster - Tuncurry	17,939	18,372	18,904	19,918	20,554	Mid North Coast
26	Kurri Kurri	12,317	12,532	13,057	16,792	20,015	Hunter
27	Ballina	16,517	16,477	15,963	16,506	18,532	Northern Rivers
28	Taree	16,621	16,517	17,820	18,117	18,110	Mid North Coast
29	Broken Hill	19,753	18,854	18,430	17,589	17,456	Orana
30	Grafton	17,380	17,501	16,598	16,787	17,155	Northern Rivers
31	Kiama	12,241	12,286	12,817	13,453	14,761	Illawarra-Shoalhaven
32	Nelson Bay	7,968	8,152	11,060	13,966	14,593	Hunter
33	Ulladulla	9,585	10,298	12,137	13,054	14,396	Illawarra-Shoalhaven
34	Singleton	12,495	13,665	13,961	13,214	14,229	Hunter
35	Raymond Terrace	12,428	12,700	13,217	13,302	14,081	Hunter
36	Batemans Bay	10,181	10,845	11,334	11,294	12,263	Southern Highlands
37	Mudgee	8,603	8,249	9,830	10,966	11,563	Central West
38	Lithgow	11,023	11,298	11,143	11,530	11,197	Central West
39	Kempsey	8,444	8,137	10,374	10,648	11,073	Mid North Coast
40	St Georges Basin - Sanctuary Point	7,604	8,343	9,242	10,143	11,000	Illawarra-Shoalhaven
41	Muswellbrook	10,010	10,222	11,042	10,404	10,901	Hunter
42	Byron Bay	5,919	4,981	4,956	9,246	10,538	Northern Rivers
43	Medowie	6,278	7,828	8,342	8,994	10,019	Hunter
44	Casino	9,150	9,400	9,629	9,982	9,968	Northern Rivers
45	Parkes	9,785	9,826	10,026	9,964	9,832	Central West
46	Murwillumbah	7,543	7,952	8,523	9,245	9,812	Northern Rivers
47	Inverell	9,525	9,749	9,347	9,547	9,654	New England
48	Moss Vale	6,601	6,723	7,305	7,865	8,774	Southern Highlands
49	Gunnedah	7,855	7,542	7,888	7,984	8,338	New England
50	Cowra	8,691	8,430	8,107	8,225	8,254	Central West
51	Merimbula	4,865	3,851	6,873	7,521	8,220	Southern Highlands
52	Camden Haven	6,460	6,891	7,177	7,532	8,037	Mid North Coast
53	Wauchope	4,759	6,002	6,372	6,881	7,982	Mid North Coast
54	Young	6,821	7,141	6,960	7,170	7,712	Southern Highlands
55	Lennox Head	5,809	5,496	5,764	6,096	7,483	Northern Rivers
56	Leeton	6,898	6,828	6,733	6,931	7,437	Riverina
57	Pottsville	2,576	3,298	5,735	6,550	7,209	Northern Rivers
58	Moree	9,247	8,083	7,720	7,383	7,070	New England
59	Forbes	7,096	6,954	6,806	7,035	6,837	Central West
60	Estella	—		2,433	3,471	6,782	Riverina
61	Nambucca Heads	6,121	5,873	6,222	6,327	6,668	Mid North Coast
62	Moama	2,818	3,331	4,198	5,620	6,654	Riverina
63	Tumut	6,197	5,925	6,086	6,154	6,518	Riverina
64	Cooma	6,914	6,587	6,301	6,379	6,447	Southern Highlands
65	Deniliquin	7,781	7,431	6,441	6,833	6,431	Riverina
66	Yamba	5,621	5,514	6,032	6,043	6,342	Northern Rivers
67	Helensburgh	5,070	5,330	5,770	6,073	6,304	Illawarra-Shoalhaven
67	Yass	4,884	5,333	5,591	5,466	5,837	Southern Highlands
68	Woolgoolga	3,793	4,356	5,050	5,290	5,797	Mid North Coast
69	Cootamundra	5,486	5,566	5,579	5,669	5,732	Riverina
70	Salamander Bay - Soldiers Point	4,957	5,232	5,101	5,279	5,605	Hunter
71	Narrabri	6,234	6,102	5,890	5,903	5,499	New England
72	North Richmond	3,548	3,635	3,668	3,885	5,467	Greater Sydney
73	South West Rocks	4,110	4,069	4,816	5,009	5,443	Mid North Coast
74	Silverdale - Warragamba	4,163	4,466	4,365	4,541	5,364	Greater Sydney
74	Glen Innes	5,707	5,944	5,173	5,161	5,184	New England
75	Alstonville	4,751	5,006	4,990	5,066	5,182	Northern Rivers
76	Tahmoor	4,131	4,236	4,126	4,562	5,014	Greater Sydney
77	Scone	4,555	4,624	5,079	4,956	5,013	Hunter

== Map ==
Cities and towns in New South Wales with populations of 20,000 or greater

== See also ==
- Demographics of Australia
- List of cities in Australia
- List of places in the Northern Territory by population
- List of places in Queensland by population
- List of places in South Australia by population
- List of places in Tasmania by population
- List of places in Victoria by population
- List of places in Western Australia by population
