= Greater Perth =

Area of extent of Perth, Western Australia

Coordinates: 31°57′S 115°51′E

Greater Perth is Perth's Greater Capital City Statistical Area (GCCSA), a geographical area designed to represent the functional extent of Western Australia's (WA) capital city.

The Greater Perth GCCSA does not define the built up edge of the city, but reflects the capital city labour market, using the 2006 Census travel to work data. The labour market is sometimes used as a de facto measure of the functional extent of a city, since it contains the majority of the commuting population.

GCCSAs were designed to provide a stable and consistent boundary that reflects the functional extent of each of Australia's capital cities. This definition was designed to include those within the urban area of the city as well as people who regularly socialise, shop or work within the city, but live in small towns and rural areas surrounding the city.

Greater Perth consists of an area equivalent to the Perth metropolitan region, as defined by the Metropolitan Region Scheme, plus the City of Mandurah and the Pinjarra Level 2 Statistical Area of the Shire of Murray.

The population of Greater Perth at the 2021 Census was 2,192,229. The population was projected to increase to between 4.4 million and 6.6 million by 2061.

In 2013, Greater Perth had a population density of 310 inhabitants per square kilometre (800/sq mi), while the rest of WA had 0.2 inhabitants per square kilometre (0.52/sq mi). In the year to 2013, the density of Greater Perth increased by 10 inhabitants per square kilometre (26/sq mi). The statistical areas with the highest population densities in Greater Perth were the north-west areas of Tuart Hill - Joondanna (3,600 inhabitants per square kilometre (9,300/sq mi)), Scarborough (3,300 inhabitants per square kilometre (8,500/sq mi)), Innaloo - Doubleview (3,100 inhabitants per square kilometre (8,000/sq mi)); and North Perth (also 3,100 inhabitants per square kilometre (8,000/sq mi)), which adjoins the central business district.

== See also ==
- 1955 Plan for the Metropolitan Region, Perth and Fremantle
- List of islands of Perth, Western Australia
- List of Perth suburbs
- Western Australian Planning Commission
