= Sandover, Northern Territory =

Sandover
- Suburb
- Coordinates: 21°58′57″S 135°30′36″E
- Country: Australia
- State: Northern Territory
- LGAs: Barkly Region; Central Desert Region
- Location: 1,133 km (704 mi) S of Darwin City
- Established: 4 April 2007

Government
  - Territory electorate: Barkly
  - Federal division: Lingiari

Area
  - Total: 18,880 km^{2} (7,290 sq mi)

Population
  - Total: 634 (2016 census)
  - Density: 0.03358/km^{2} (0.08697/sq mi)
- Time zone: UTC+9:30 (ACST)
- Postcode: 0872
- Mean max temp: 31.0 °C (87.8 °F)
- Mean min temp: 14.6 °C (58.3 °F)
- Annual rainfall: 288.6 mm (11.36 in)
Suburbs around Sandover
Davenport	Davenport; Costello	Costello
Davenport; Anmatjere	Sandover	Costello; Anatye
Anmatjere	Hart; Anatye	Anatye
- Locations; Adjoining localities (Note: The locality of Sandover fully surrounds the community of Ampilatwatja.)

Sandover is a locality in the Northern Territory of Australia located about 1,133 kilometres (704 mi) south of the territory capital of Darwin.

The locality’s name is derived from the Sandover River whose course passes through the locality and which is considered to be named in 1878 after William Sandover, a South Australian politician. It fully surrounds the community of Ampilatwatja, which lies within the Aboriginal homelands area of Utopia, Northern Territory. Its boundaries and name were gazetted on 4 April 2007.

The Sandover Highway passes through the locality from the south-west to the north-east.

Sandover includes the following places that have been listed on the Northern Territory Heritage Register – the Eldo Rocket Shelters Ooratippra and the Old MacDonald Downs Homestead.

The 2016 Australian census which was conducted in August 2016 reports that Sandover had 634 people living within its boundaries, of whom 45.2% were male, 54.8% were female and 91.6% (577) identified as “Aboriginal and/or Torres Strait Islander people.”

Sandover is located within the federal division of Lingiari, the territory electoral division of Barkly and the local government areas of the Barkly Region and the Central Desert Region.
