= Renner Springs =

Renner Springs Pamayu, Northern Territory
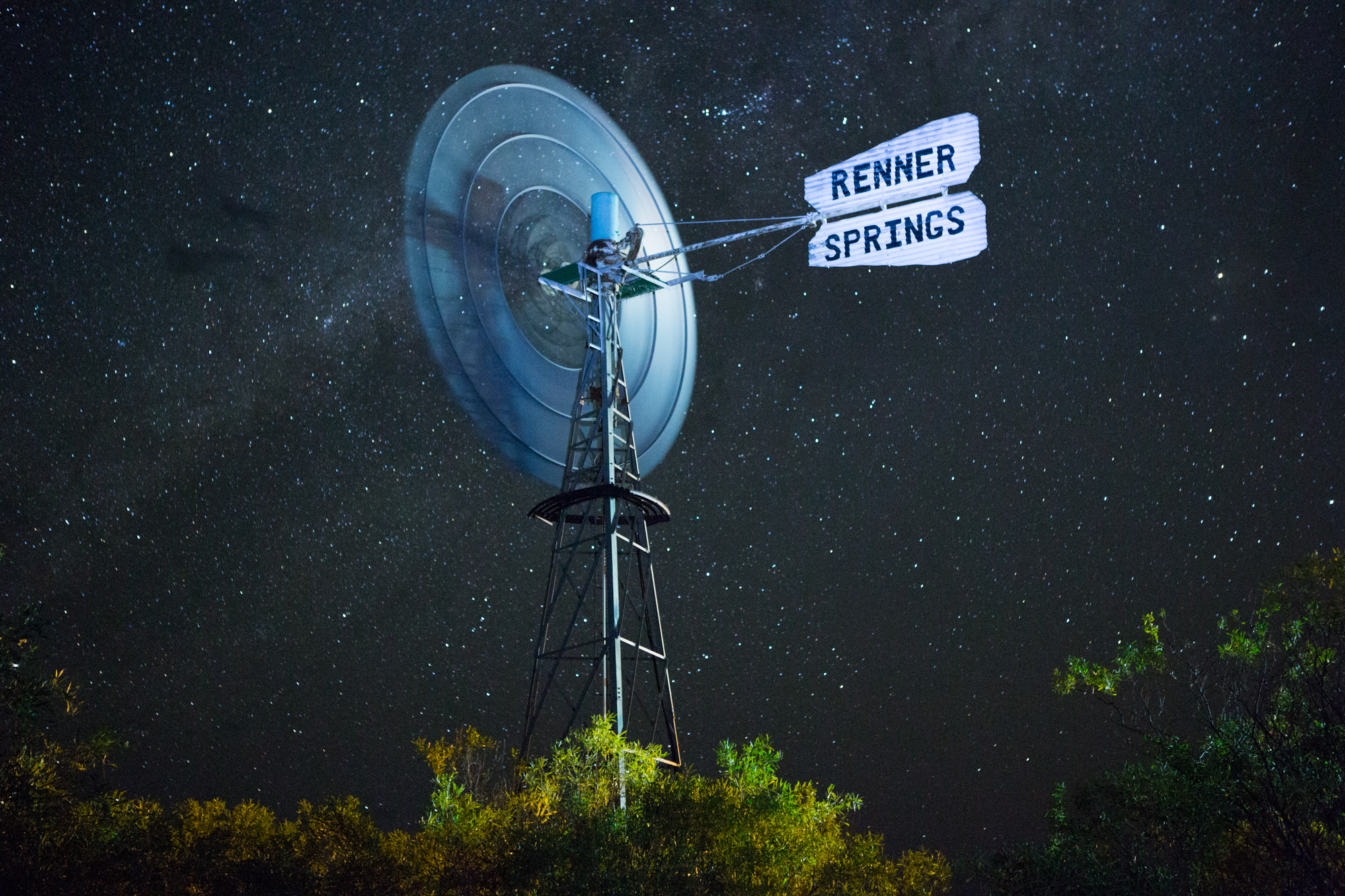
- Renner Springs Windmill at the Renner Springs Desert Inn

- Coordinates: 18°19′07″S 133°47′45″E
- Location: 820 km (510 mi) S of Darwin; 161 km (100 mi) N of Tennant Creek

Renner Springs is a location in the Northern Territory of Australia. It is in the heart of the Barkly Tablelands cattle country, and the town promotes itself as "The Heart of the Beef Country".

The tiny settlement is on the Stuart Highway, north of the intersection of the Barkly Highway and Tennant Creek. It is 662 kilometres from Alice Springs, the largest town in the Outback, and 820 km from Darwin.

Renner Springs is usually regarded as the border between the tropical Top End and the temperate Red Centre regions.

== History ==
Like so many places along the Stuart Highway, it owes its origins to the Australian Overland Telegraph Line. It was named after Frederick Renner, who was dispensing medical advice to the team working on the telegraph line when they passed through the springs in 1872. In 1877, Renner saw a flock of birds while working on the telegraph line and found that the birds were drawn to this particular area by the natural springs, which was later named Mud Springs. These freshwater springs, which bubble up from underground, helped the area surrounding Renner Springs achieve its importance because they provided water to the area. Lake Woods is just north of the town, near Elliott and Newcastle Waters, Northern Territory.

== Roadhouse ==
Established in the 1950s, the Renner Springs Desert Hotel/Motel also has gas, a bar and restaurant, game room and limited Internet access. A caravan park and shaded camp sites are also available.

The roadhouse building is an old army hut relocated after World War II from the army's staging camp 50 km away at Banka Banka Station, which dates from 1885.

== Attractions ==
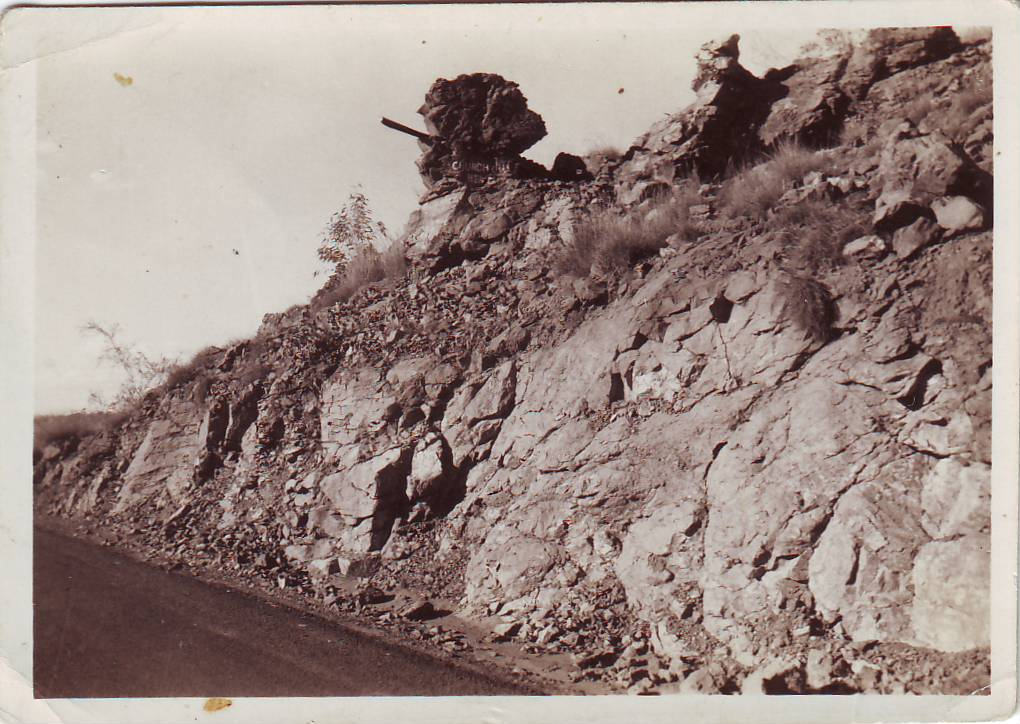
Churchill's Head Rock, as pictured during World War II

=== Churchill's Head Rock ===
Churchill's Head Rock is on the old Stuart Highway 78 km south of Renner Springs. The rock, on the east of the old highway, looks vaguely like a profile of Winston Churchill. In order to make the image more persuasive, someone has stuck a piece of piping where the mouth should be so that the profile appears to be smoking a rather large cigar.

=== Attack Creek ===
11 km south of Renner Springs is a monument marking the place where on 25 June 1860, John McDouall Stuart, on his second attempt to cross Australia, was confronted by Warumungu people, after which he named it Attack Creek.

== Temperatures ==
Renner Springs has high summer temperatures. The summer average maximum is about 35 °C. The summer low is about 24 °C.

Renner Springs has warm winter temperatures. The winter high temperature is about 20 °C. The winter low is about 5 °C.
