= Tanami East =

- Suburb
- Coordinates: 18°29′17″S 132°48′31″E
- Country: Australia
- State: Northern Territory
- LGA: Barkly Region
- Location: 510 km (320 mi) S of Darwin City
- Established: 4 April 2007

Government
  - Territory electorate: Barkly
  - Federal division: Lingiari

Area
  - Total: 52,842 km^{2} (20,402 sq mi)

Population
  - Total: 13 (2021 census)
  - Density: 0.000246/km^{2} (0.000637/sq mi)
- Time zone: UTC+9:30 (ACST)
- Postcode: 0852
- Mean max temp: 30.4 °C (86.7 °F)
- Mean min temp: 15.4 °C (59.7 °F)
- Annual rainfall: 377.8 mm (14.87 in)
Suburbs around Tanami East
Victoria River	Victoria River; Birdum	Birdum
Gurindji; Tanami	Tanami East	Pamayu; Tablelands; Warumungu
Tanami	Tanami; Anmatjere; Warumungu	Warumungu
- Locations; Adjoining localities

Tanami East is a locality in the Northern Territory of Australia located about 510 kilometres (320 mi) south of the territory capital of Darwin.

The locality consists of the following land in the north eastern portion of the Tanami Desert—the Karlantijpa North Aboriginal Land Trust, the Murranji Aboriginal Land Trust and the Murranji pastoral lease. It has an area of 52,842 square kilometres (20,402 sq mi). Its boundaries and name were gazetted on 4 April 2007.

The Adelaide-Darwin Railway passes from south to north through parts of the eastern side of the locality.

Tanami East includes the following places that have been listed on the Northern Territory Heritage Register – the Murranji Track, the Murranji Track, Murranji Bore & Waterhole and the Murranji Track, No. 11 Bore.

The 2021 Australian census, which was conducted in August 2021, reports that Tanami East had 13 people living within its boundaries.

Tanami East is located within the federal division of Lingiari, the territory electoral division of Barkly and the local government area of the Barkly Region.
