= Pamayu, Northern Territory =

Pamayu Northern Territory
- Coordinates: 17°36′05″S 134°08′40″E
- Population: 33 (2016 census)
- Established: 4 April 2007
- Postcode(s): 0862
- Time zone: ACST (UTC+9:30)
- Location: 725 km (450 mi) SE of Darwin City
- LGA(s): Barkly Region
- Territory electorate(s): Barkly
- Federal division(s): Lingiari
| Mean max temp | Mean min temp | Annual rainfall |
| 34.5 °C; 94 °F | 19.1 °C; 66 °F | 601.8 mm 23.7 in |
Suburbs around Pamayu:
| Tanami East | Tanami East; Arnolds; Mcarthur | Mcarthur |
| Tanami East | Pamayu | Mcarthur; Creswell; Tablelands |
| Tanami East | Tanami East; Tablelands | Tablelands |
- Footnotes: Locations; Adjoining localities (Note: the locality of Pamayu fully surrounds the localities of Elliott and Newcastle Waters.)

Pamayu is a locality in the Northern Territory of Australia located about 725 kilometres (450 mi) south-east of the territory capital of Darwin.

The locality’s name which is pronounced as "Bama-yu" is derived from the local Djingli aboriginal people’s name for the site where the Powell Creek Telegraph Station was located. Its boundaries and name were gazetted on 4 April 2007 and fully surrounds the localities of Elliott and Newcastle Waters. Its boundary with the locality of Elliott was amended on 20 January 2016.

The Stuart Highway and the Adelaide-Darwin Railway both pass from south to north on the western side of the locality.

Pamayu includes the following places that have been listed on the Northern Territory Heritage Register – the Powell Creek Telegraph Station and the Ucharonidge Station No. 1 Bore & Windmill.

The 2016 Australian census which was conducted in August 2016 reports that Pamayu had 33 people living within its boundaries.

Pamayu is located within the federal division of Lingiari, the territory electoral division of Barkly and the local government area of the Barkly Region.
