= Tablelands, Northern Territory =

Suburb in the Northern Territory, Australia

Tablelands Northern Territory
- Coordinates: 19°01′35″S 135°18′18″E
- Population: 210 (2016 census)
  - Density: 0.00629/km^{2} (0.0163/sq mi)
- Established: 4 April 2007
- Postcode(s): 0862
- Area: 33,393 km^{2} (12,893.1 sq mi)
- Time zone: ACST (UTC+9:30)
- Location: 858 km (533 mi) SE of Darwin City
- LGA(s): Barkly Region
- Territory electorate(s): Barkly
- Federal division(s): Lingiari
| Mean max temp | Mean min temp | Annual rainfall |
| 33.5 °C; 92 °F | 18.7 °C; 66 °F | 421.9 mm 16.6 in |
Suburbs around Tablelands:
| Pamayu | Pamayu; Creswell | Creswell |
| Pamayu; Tanami East | Tablelands | Creswell; Nicholson; Ranken |
| Warumungu | Warumungu; Costello | Ranken |
- Footnotes: Locations; Adjoining localities

Tablelands is a locality in the Northern Territory of Australia located about 858 kilometres (533 mi) south-east of the territory capital of Darwin.

The locality consists of the following land (from west to east, then north to south):

1. Banka Banka West pastoral lease
2. Banka Banka and Bruchilly pastoral leases
3. Rockhampton Downs pastoral lease and land described as NT Portion 502, and
4. Brunette Downs pastoral lease, NT Portion 4472, and Alroy Downs and Dalmopre Downs pastoral leases.

The locality’s boundaries and name were gazetted on 4 April 2007. Its name is derived from the Barkly Tableland. As of 2020, it has an area of 33,393 square kilometres (12,893 sq mi).

The Barkly Highway passes from west to east along the southern side of the locality forming part of its southern boundary at its eastern end.

Tablelands includes the homestead known as the Banka Banka Mud Hut which was listed on the Northern Territory Heritage Register on 30 August 2006.

The 2016 Australian census which was conducted in August 2016 reports that Tablelands had 210 people living within its boundaries.

Tablelands is located within the federal division of Lingiari, the territory electoral division of Barkly and the local government area of the Barkly Region.
