= Davenport, Northern Territory =

Davenport Northern Territory
- Coordinates: 20°53′46″S 134°49′05″E
- Population: 145 (2021 census)
  - Density: 0.005042/km^{2} (0.01306/sq mi)
- Established: 4 April 2007
- Postcode(s): 0872
- Area: 28,761 km^{2} (11,104.7 sq mi)
- Time zone: ACST (UTC+9:30)
- Location: 1,057 km (657 mi) S of Darwin
- LGA(s): Barkly Region
- Territory electorate(s): Barkly
- Federal division(s): Lingiari
Mean max temp	Mean min temp	Annual rainfall
31.0 °C; 88 °F	14.6 °C; 58 °F	286.9 mm 11.3 in
Suburbs around Davenport:
Warumungu	Warumungu	Costello
Warumungu	Davenport	Costello
Anmatjere	Anmatjere; Costello	Costello
- Footnotes: Adjoining localities (Note: The locality of Davenport fully surrounds the communities of Ali Curung, Tara and Wutungurra.)

Davenport is a locality in the Northern Territory of Australia located about 1,057 kilometres (657 mi) south of the territory capital of Darwin.

== History ==
The locality's boundaries and name were gazetted on 4 April 2007. Its name is derived from the mountain range which was named in 1860 by John McDouall Stuart as the Davenport Range after Samuel Davenport, a South Australian politician.

Davenport includes the following places that have been listed on the Northern Territory Heritage Register – the Barrow Creek Hotel, the Barrow Creek Telegraph Station and the Neutral Junction Homestead (Old).

== Description ==
The locality consists of the following land (from west to east):

1. The Singleton and Neutral Junction pastoral leases
2. The Kurundi and Murray Downs pastoral leases, and the Mungkarta Aboriginal Lands Trust (also spelt Mungarta and also known as McLaren Creek)
3. The Epenarra pastoral lease, the Warumungu and Anurrete Aboriginal Lands Trusts and the Elkedra pastoral lease

The locality fully surrounds the communities of Ali Curung, Tara and Wutungurra. As of 2020, it has an area of 28,761 square kilometres (11,105 sq mi).

== Demographics ==
Historical population
Year	Pop.	±%
2011	176	—
2016	178	+1.1%
2021	145	−18.5%
Source: (Note: 2011 Aboriginal and/or Torres Strait Islander people population)

The 2021 Australian census reported 145 people living in the locality, an 18.5% decrease from the previous census in 2016.

The 2016 Australian census which was conducted in August 2016 reported that Davenport had 178 people living within its boundaries of which 59.4% were male, 40.6% were female and 59.3% who identified as “Aboriginal and/or Torres Strait Islander people.”

== Governance ==
Davenport is located within the federal division of Lingiari, the territory electoral division of Barkly and the local government area of the Barkly Region.
