= Costello, Northern Territory =

Costello Northern Territory
- Coordinates: 20°55′13″S 136°46′52″E
- Population: 12 (2016 census) (Note: For the 2016 census, the State Suburb of Costello whose boundaries align with those of the locality of Costello, did not include the localities of Canteen Creek and Alpurrurulam.)
  - Density: 0.000306/km^{2} (0.00079/sq mi)
- Established: 4 April 2007
- Postcode(s): 0872
- Area: 39,159 km^{2} (15,119.4 sq mi)
- Time zone: ACST (UTC+9:30)
- Location: 1,175 km (730 mi) SE of Darwin
- LGA(s): Barkly Region
- Territory electorate(s): Barkly
- Federal division(s): Lingiari
Mean max temp	Mean min temp	Annual rainfall
31.0 °C; 88 °F	14.6 °C; 58 °F	286.9 mm 11.3 in
Suburbs around Costello:
Tablelands	Tablelands; Ranken	Queensland
Warumungu; Davenport; Sandover	Costello	Queensland
Sandover	Sandover; Anatye	Queensland
- Footnotes: Adjoining localities

Costello is a locality in the Northern Territory of Australia located in the territory's east adjoining the border with the state of Queensland about 1,057 kilometres (657 mi) south-east of the territory capital of Darwin.

The locality consists of the following land (from north to south, then west to east):

1. The Wakaya Aboriginal Lands Trust and land described as NT Portion 4246
2. The Arruwurra Aboriginal Corporation, NT Portions 4247, 581, 1094 and 1095, and the Argadargada pastoral lease and,
3. The Georgina Downs and Lake Nash pastoral leases

The locality fully surrounds the localities of Alpurrurulam and Canteen Creek. As of 2020, it has an area of 39,159 square kilometres (15,119 sq mi).

The locality's boundaries and name were gazetted on 4 April 2007. Its name is derived from the mountain range which was named in June 1989 as the Costello Range after John Costello, a pastoralist who established the Lake Nash Station in 1890 after moving his cattle from the Valley of the Springs Station which was located on the course of the Limmen Bight River.

Costello includes the following places listed on the Northern Territory Heritage Register – the Eldo Rocket Shelters Annitowa and the Eldo Rocket Shelters Argadargada.

The 2016 Australian census which was conducted in August 2016 reports that Costello had a population of 12 people.

Costello is located within the federal division of Lingiari, the territory electoral division of Barkly and the local government area of the Barkly Region.
