= Ranken, Northern Territory =

Ranken Northern Territory
- Coordinates: 20°05′22″S 137°13′08″E
- Population: 44 (2016 census)
  - Density: 0.002217/km^{2} (0.00574/sq mi)
- Established: 4 April 2007
- Postcode(s): 4825
- Area: 19,844 km^{2} (7,661.8 sq mi)
- Time zone: ACST (UTC+9:30)
- Location: 1,098 km (682 mi) SE of Darwin
- LGA(s): Barkly Region
- Territory electorate(s): Barkly
- Federal division(s): Lingiari
Mean max temp	Mean min temp	Annual rainfall
32.9 °C; 91 °F	17.7 °C; 64 °F	398.9 mm 15.7 in
Suburbs around Ranken:
Tablelands	Nicholson	Queensland
Tablelands; Costello	Ranken	Queensland
Costello	Costello	Queensland
- Footnotes: Adjoining localities

Ranken is a locality in the Northern Territory of Australia located in the territory's east adjoining the border with the state of Queensland about 1,098 kilometres (682 mi) south-east of the territory capital of Darwin.

The locality consists of the following land (from west to east, then north to south):

1. The West Ranken pastoral lease
2. The East Ranken and Soudan pastoral leases
3. The Adder, Avon Downs and Burramurra pastoral leases. and
4. The Rocklands and Austral Downs pastoral leases.

As of 2020, it has an area of 19,844 square kilometres (7,662 sq mi).

The locality’s boundaries and name were gazetted on 4 April 2007. Its name is derived from the Ranken River which was named in the 1860s after John LC Ranken, the pastoralist who first established Lorne Creek, which is now known as the Avon Downs Station.

Ranken includes the following places listed on the Northern Territory Heritage Register – Avon Downs Pastoral Station, the Eldo Rocket Shelter Austral Downs and the Eldo Rocket Shelters Argadargada.

The 2016 Australian census which was conducted in August 2016 reports that Ranken had a population of 44 people.

Ranken is located within the federal division of Lingiari, the territory electoral division of Barkly and the local government area of the Barkly Region.
