= Tanami, Northern Territory =

Tanami Northern Territory
- Coordinates: 19°50′27″S 130°41′10″E
- Population: 73 (2016 census)
  - Density: 0.001037/km^{2} (0.002685/sq mi)
- Established: 4 April 2007
- Postcode(s): 0872
- Area: 70,407 km^{2} (27,184.3 sq mi)
- Time zone: ACST (UTC+9:30)
- Location: 844 km (524 mi) S of Darwin City
- LGA(s): Central Desert Region
- Territory electorate(s): Gwoja
- Federal division(s): Lingiari
Mean max temp	Mean min temp	Annual rainfall
33.9 °C; 93 °F	16.6 °C; 62 °F	473.5 mm 18.6 in
Suburbs around Tanami:
Western Australia	Buchanan; Gurindji	Tanami East
Western Australia	Tanami	Tanami East; Warumungu; Anmatyerre
Western Australia	Lake Mackay; Chilla Well	Anmatyerre
- Footnotes: Locations; Adjoining localities

Tanami is a locality in the Northern Territory of Australia located about 844 kilometres (524 mi) south of the territory capital of Darwin on the border with the state of Western Australia.

The locality consists of the following land in the south-west portion of the Tanami Desert:

1. The following land along the Western Australian border (from north to south) - the Yingualyalya Aboriginal Land Trust, the Purta Aboriginal Land Trust, the Mount Frederick Aboriginal Land Trust, the Mount Frederick (No. 2) Aboriginal Land Trust, the Mangkururrpa Aboriginal Land Trust and the Yiningarra Aboriginal Land Trust.
2. the Suplejack pastoral lease and
3. the portion of the Central Desert Aboriginal Land Trust located to the immediate east of the above parcels of land.

The word Tanami, which is believed to an Aboriginal word whose meaning is not known, was first used by the prospector, Alan Davidson, in 1889 or 1890. Its boundaries and name were gazetted on 4 April 2007.

The Tanami Road passes through the locality from Yuendumu in the south to the north-west on its way to Halls Creek connecting to places such as The Granites gold mine and the former Rabbit Flat roadhouse.

The 2016 Australian census which was conducted in August 2016 reports that Tanami had 73 people living within its boundaries.

Tanami is located within the federal division of Lingiari, the territory electoral division of Stuart and the local government area of the Central Desert Region.
