= Nicholson, Northern Territory =

Nicholson
- Suburb
- Coordinates: 18°30′14″S 137°13′07″E
- Country: Australia
- State: Northern Territory
- LGA: Barkly Region
- Location: 963 km (598 mi) SE of Darwin
- Established: 4 April 2007

Government
  - Territory electorate: Barkly
  - Federal division: Lingiari

Area
  - Total: 26,671 km^{2} (10,298 sq mi)

Population
  - Total: 60 (2016 census)
  - Density: 0.00225/km^{2} (0.0058/sq mi)
- Time zone: UTC+9:30 (ACST)
- Postcode: 0862
- Mean max temp: 32.9 °C (91.2 °F)
- Mean min temp: 17.7 °C (63.9 °F)
- Annual rainfall: 398.9 mm (15.70 in)
Suburbs around Nicholson
Calvert	Calvert	Queensland
Creswell; Tablelands	Nicholson	Queensland
Tablelands	Ranken	Queensland

Nicholson is a locality in the Northern Territory of Australia located in the territory's east adjoining the border with the state of Queensland about 963 kilometres (598 mi) south-east of the territory capital of Darwin.

The locality consists of the following land (from north to south, then west to east):

1. The Waannyi/Garawa Aboriginal Lands Trust
2. Land described as NT Portion 561, and the Mittiehan and Mount Drummond pastoral leases, and
3. The Alexandria pastoral lease.

As of 2020, it has an area of 26,671 square kilometres (10,298 sq mi).

The locality's boundaries and name were gazetted on 4 April 2007. Its name is derived from the Nicholson River which was named by the explorer Ludwig Leichhardt during his 1844/45 expedition after "Dr William Alleyne Nicholson of Bristol, England."

The 2016 Australian census which was conducted in August 2016 reports that Nicholson had a population of 60 people.

Nicholson is located within the federal division of Lingiari, the territory electoral division of Barkly and the local government area of the Barkly Region.
