= Regions of the Northern Territory =

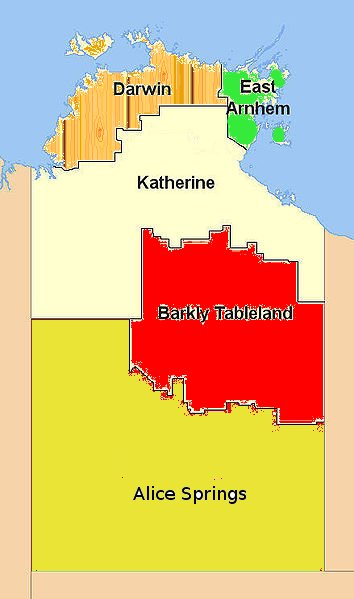

Federal and territory government agencies divide the Northern Territory of Australia into different administrative regions, though their names and boundaries vary.

== ABS regions ==
The federal Bureau of Statistics defines nine "level 3" statistical areas (SA3s) within the Territory.

=== Darwin metropolitan ===
Darwin city and suburbs, Palmerston and Litchfield – make up the Darwin metropolitan area and together account for more than half the Territory's population.

=== Daly–Tiwi–West Arnhem ===
The Daly–Tiwi–West Arnhem statistical area surrounds metropolitan Darwin on all sides and is made up of four regional councils: Tiwi Islands, West Daly, part of the Victoria Daly Region and West Arnhem. The region is predominantly tropical savannah.

Daly–Tiwi–West Arnhem is represented in the Territory's Legislative Assembly by the members for Arafura, Arnhem and Daly.

=== East Arnhem ===
East Arnhem, centred on the town of Nhulunbuy, is a level-3 statistical region, local government region and tourism region. East Arnhem is represented in the Legislative Assembly by the member for Nhulunbuy. The region is predominantly tropical savannah.

=== Katherine ===
The Katherine region is centred on the outback town of Katherine and forms one of the Territory's tourism regions. The region is predominantly tropical savannah and semi-arid land. For local government purposes, it is further divided into the southern Victoria Daly and Roper Gulf regions.

The Katherine region is represented in the Legislative Assembly by the members for Barkly, Katherine and Stuart.

=== Barkly ===
The Barkly local government region is roughly coterminous with the Barkly Tableland and the "Tennant Creek and surrounds" tourist region. The region is predominantly tropical savannah and semi-arid land. The Barkly region is represented in the Legislative Assembly by the member for Barkly.

=== Alice Springs ===
The Alice Springs region, apart from the town, is composed largely of desert. It is divided into a northern, Central Desert (main towns Ti-Tree, Yuendumu, and Lajamanu, with Alice Springs a separate LGA), and a southern, MacDonnell Ranges region.

The Alice Springs region is represented in the Legislative Assembly by the members for Araluen, Braitling, Namatjira and Stuart.

== Economic planning regions ==
There are six regions defined by the Northern Territory Government for the purposes of economic planning:

- East Arnhem (also an LGA)
- Barkly Region (also an LGA)
- Big Rivers Region
- Central Australia
- Top End
- Darwin, Palmerston & Litchfield

== Tourism ==
For tourism purposes, the Alice Springs area is grouped into a single region centred on the town, with a smaller Uluru region excised in the south-west.

=== Red Centre ===
The region around Alice Springs is often referred to informally as the "Red Centre", after the colour of the soil.

=== Top End ===
Metropolitan Darwin, Daly–Tiwi–West Arnhem and East Arnhem are sometimes grouped informally as the "Top End", although this term is often loosely applied. For tourism purposes, the Top End is then divided into Darwin (including the Tiwi Islands), Kakadu National Park (including West Arnhem) and East Arnhem.
