= Warumunga, Northern Territory =

Warumunga Northern Territory
- Coordinates: 20°08′16″S 133°52′28″E
- Population: 146 (SAL 2021)
- Established: 4 April 2007
- Postcode(s): 0852
- Area: 39,870 km^{2} (15,393.9 sq mi)
- Time zone: ACST (UTC+9:30)
- Location: 902 km (560 mi) SE of Darwin City
- LGA(s): Barkly Region
- Territory electorate(s): Barkly
- Federal division(s): Lingiari
| Mean max temp | Mean min temp | Annual rainfall |
| 32.0 °C; 90 °F | 19.0 °C; 66 °F | 473.1 mm 18.6 in |
Suburbs around Warumunga:
| Tanami East | Tanami East; Tablelands | Tablelands |
| Tanami East; Tanami; Anmatjere | Warumunga | Tablelands; Costello |
| Anmatjere | Anmatjere; Davenport | Costello |
- Footnotes: Locations; Adjoining localities (Note: The locality of Warumunga fully surrounds the locality of Tennant Creek)

Warumunga is a locality in the Northern Territory of Australia located about 902 kilometres (560 mi) south-east of the territory capital of Darwin.

The locality’s name derived from the "Warumungu Land Trust" [sic], which make up a large part of the locality. Its boundaries and name were gazetted on 4 April 2007. As of 2020, it has an area of 39,870 square kilometres (15,390 sq mi).

The 2016 Australian census reports that Warumunga had 157 people living within its boundaries, of which 112 (69.6%) identified as Aboriginal and/or Torres Strait Islander people. The population fell to 146 in the 2021 census.

Warumunga is located within the federal Division of Lingiari, the territory electoral division of Barkly and the local government area of the Barkly Region.

== See also ==
- Nobles Nob mine
