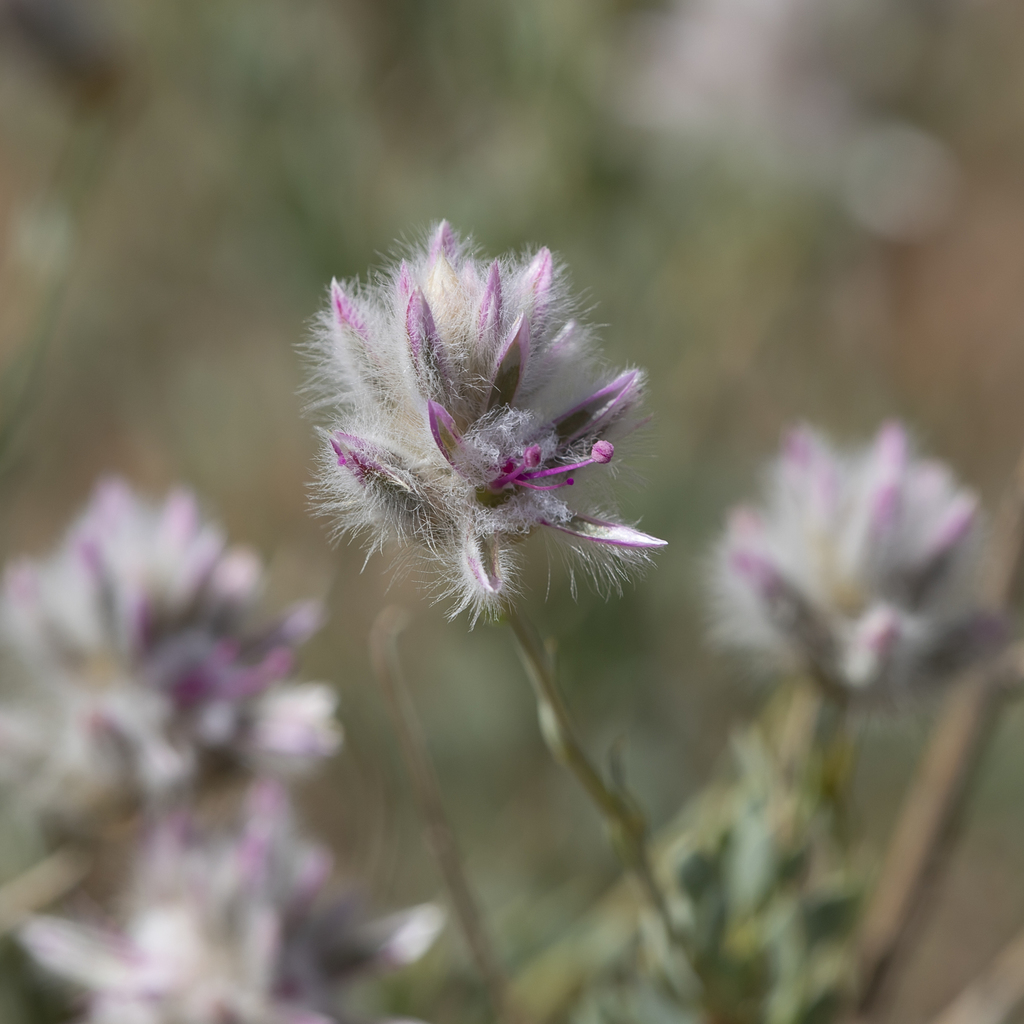
- Near Davenport

Scientific classification
- Kingdom: Plantae
- Clade: Tracheophytes
- Clade: Angiosperms
- Clade: Eudicots
- Order: Caryophyllales
- Family: Amaranthaceae
- Genus: Ptilotus
- Species: P. whitei

Binomial name
- Ptilotus whitei F.Muell.

Synonyms
- List: Trichinium whitei J.M.Black; Ptilotus parvifolius auct. non (F.Muell.) F.Muell.: Black, J.M. (January 1948) p.p.; Ptilotus parvifolius var. parvifolius auct. non (F.Muell.) F.Muell.: Benl, G. (1970) p.p.; Ptilotus parvifolius var. parvifolius auct. non (F.Muell.) F.Muell.: Benl, G. in Jessop, J.P. p.p.; Ptilotus parvifolius var. parvifolius auct. non (F.Muell.) F.Muell.: Benl, G. in Jessop, J.P. & Toelken, H.R. (ed.) (1986)p.p.; Trichinium parvifolium auct. non F.Muell.: Black, J.M. (1924)

= Ptilotus whitei =

Species of plant

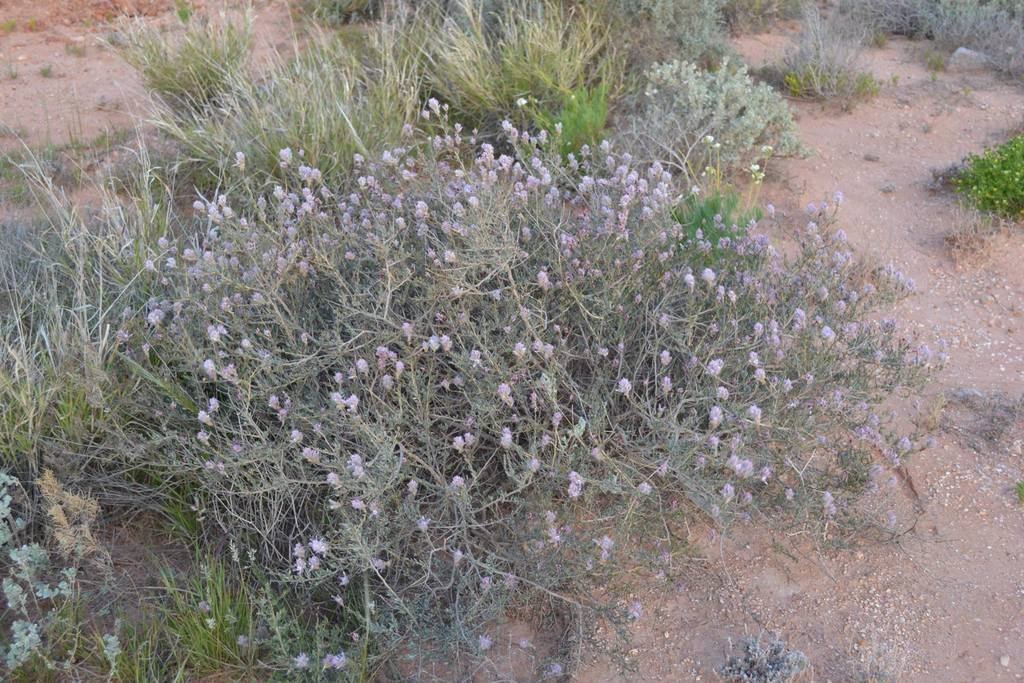
Habit near Ghan

Ptilotus whitei is a species of flowering plant of the family Amaranthaceae and is endemic to Central Australia. It is a dense, rigid, sometimes widely-branched, low or erect shrub with glabrous, sometimes glaucous stems, sessile, bluish or greyish green, narrowly to broadly egg-shaped leaves, and hairy pink or purplish flowers arranged in hemispherical or conical heads.

== Description ==
Ptilotus whitei is a dense, rigid, sometimes widely branched shrub that typically grows up to 1 m (3 ft 3 in) tall, but usually less than 0.5 m (1 ft 8 in) and usually glabrous, sometimes glaucous stems. The leaves are arranged alternately, sessile or on a short petiole, narrowly to broadly egg-shaped, sometimes more or less spatula-shaped, 4–16 mm (0.16–0.63 in) long and 1.2–12 mm (0.047–0.472 in) wide, often with a slightly pointed tip. The flowers are borne in hemispherical or short-conical spikes on the ends of branches, with hairy bracts and bracteoles 3.5–6 mm (0.14–0.24 in) long. The perianth is pale pink or purple, or red with grey hairs, 9–12.5 mm (0.35–0.49 in) long, the tepals moderately hairy. There are two fertile stamens and three staminodes, the style is 5.6–7.5 mm (0.22–0.30 in) long and fixed to the side of the ovary. Flowering mainly occurs from April to October and the fruit are glabrous, 2–3 mm (0.079–0.118 in) long and 0.8–1.5 mm (0.031–0.059 in) wide.

== Taxonomy ==
This species was first formally described in 1914 by John McConnell Black who gave it the name Trichinium whitei in Transactions and Proceedings of the Royal Society of South Australia from specimens collected "30 mi (48 km) east of Deep Well" by Samuel Albert White. In 2008, Terena R. Lally transferred the species to Ptilotus as P. whitei. The specific epithet (whitei) honours "the organizer and leader of the expedition".

== Distribution and habitat ==
This species of Ptilotus grows in red, brown or yellow soils or gravelly clay or sand, on gibber plains, scree slopes, quartzitic sandstone hills, limestone outcrops, rocky breakaways, gullies and creekbeds in the south of the Northern Territory and the north of South Australia.
