= Elliott, Northern Territory =

Elliott
- Town
- Coordinates: 17°33′10″S 133°32′27″E
- Country: Australia
- State: Northern Territory
- LGA: Barkly Region
- Location: 636 km (395 mi) from Darwin; 761 km (473 mi) from Alice Springs
- Established: 1 May 1947 (town); 4 April 2007

Government
  - Territory electorate: Barkly
  - Federal division: Lingiari
- Elevation: 220 m (720 ft)

Population
  - Total: 287 (2021 census)
- Time zone: UTC+9:30 (ACST)
- Postcode: 0862
- Mean max temp: 34.5 °C (94.1 °F)
- Mean min temp: 19.1 °C (66.4 °F)
- Annual rainfall: 601.8 mm (23.69 in)
Localities around Elliott
Pamayu	Pamayu	Pamayu
Pamayu	Elliott	Pamayu
Pamayu	Pamayu	Pamayu

Elliott (Jingili: Kulumindini) is a town in Northern Territory of Australia. It is almost halfway between Darwin and Alice Springs on the Stuart Highway. The town is in the Yapurkulangu ward of the Barkly Region. At the 2021 census, Elliott had a population of 287.

== History ==
The area is the home of the Jingili people and the traditional name of the town is Kulumindini. The town began at the site of Number 8 Bore on Newcastle Waters Station as an Australian Army camp during World War II. It is named after Army Captain R.D (Snow) Elliott MBE.

== Geography ==
Elliott is on the edge of the Newcastle Waters Station and is 23 kilometres (14 mi) from Newcastle Waters, a town near the station homestead and at the junction of three important stock routes. It lies close to the seasonal Lake Woods and is located within the federal division of Lingiari, the territory electoral division of Barkly and the local government area of the Barkly Region.

== Climate ==
Elliott experiences a hot semi-arid climate (Köppen climate classification BSh), being a little too dry to be classified as a tropical savanna climate (Aw), with a wet season from late November to March and a dry season from April to late October.

Climate data for Elliott, elevation 220 m (720 ft), (1991–2020 normals, extremes 1980–present)
Month	Jan	Feb	Mar	Apr	May	Jun	Jul	Aug	Sep	Oct	Nov	Dec	Year
Record high °C (°F)	45.8 (114.4)	44.9 (112.8)	43.0 (109.4)	40.3 (104.5)	38.5 (101.3)	36.4 (97.5)	36.2 (97.2)	38.6 (101.5)	42.0 (107.6)	44.4 (111.9)	45.0 (113.0)	46.5 (115.7)	46.5 (115.7)
Mean daily maximum °C (°F)	37.2 (99.0)	36.4 (97.5)	35.8 (96.4)	34.8 (94.6)	31.0 (87.8)	28.6 (83.5)	28.7 (83.7)	31.2 (88.2)	35.8 (96.4)	38.0 (100.4)	39.2 (102.6)	38.4 (101.1)	34.6 (94.3)
Mean daily minimum °C (°F)	24.3 (75.7)	23.9 (75.0)	22.5 (72.5)	19.8 (67.6)	15.9 (60.6)	12.9 (55.2)	11.6 (52.9)	12.9 (55.2)	17.6 (63.7)	21.0 (69.8)	23.5 (74.3)	24.6 (76.3)	19.2 (66.6)
Record low °C (°F)	16.0 (60.8)	15.7 (60.3)	12.2 (54.0)	9.0 (48.2)	6.2 (43.2)	2.5 (36.5)	1.5 (34.7)	1.8 (35.2)	7.2 (45.0)	7.5 (45.5)	12.3 (54.1)	14.4 (57.9)	1.5 (34.7)
Average rainfall mm (inches)	170.9 (6.73)	160.9 (6.33)	68.1 (2.68)	20.7 (0.81)	7.6 (0.30)	3.5 (0.14)	0.8 (0.03)	0.5 (0.02)	4.0 (0.16)	19.6 (0.77)	45.7 (1.80)	124.2 (4.89)	626.5 (24.66)
Average rainy days (≥ 1.0 mm)	9.7	9	5.6	1.2	0.7	0.4	0.2	0.1	0.7	2.4	4.4	8.4	42.8
Source: Australian Bureau of Meteorology

== Demographics ==
Historical population
Year	Pop.	±%
2011	348	—
2016	339	−2.6%
2021	287	−15.3%
Source: Australian Bureau of Statistics data.

Since the township was officially recognised in 2007, its population has consistently declined.

As of the 2021 census, Aboriginal Australians make up 85% of the town's population, a proportional decrease from the 2016 census (87.2%) but an increase from 2011 (82.7%).

The most common level of highest educational attainment is Year 10 (21.1%) with Year 9 or below in second place (16.2%). The most common level of tertiary education, as well as third most common level overall, is Certificate level III (13.7%). This represents a drop in the level of educational attainment since 2016 when Certificate III was the top response (24.3%) and a decrease of the proportion of educational attainment past high school dropping 8.7% between 2016 (37.2%) and 2021 (28.5%).

== Community Services ==
Barkly Regional Council, with the support of Library & Archives NT, delivers public library and information services in Elliott through the Tennant Creek Public Library. The Library has a range of services available to all residents & visitors to the region. Visitors to the region can also access temporary membership for the duration of their stay. The Library has a range of services available including computer access, Wi-Fi, printing and scanning. For resources not available through Tennant Creek Public Library's print or eResource collection the Inter-Library Loans service can attempt to source for you from another library in the Northern Territory.

Library members have access to additional benefits including borrowing of a large collection of resources (Fiction, Non-Fiction, Large Print and Picture books; Comics & Graphic Novels; Movies and TV Series; Music CDs; Audiobooks; Magazines) from nearly and public library in NT, free Internet, online resources like BorrowBox and Busythings.

== Industry ==
Elliott is the proposed site of a very large solar panel installation that is part of the Sun Cable project.

== Notable people ==
- Beetaloo Jangari Bill.
- The members of the Kulumindini Band.
- Elliot McAdam.
- Jake Neade, an AFL footballer.
- Stuart Joel Nugget

== In Popular Culture ==
The town served as the inspiration for the 2026 single 'Elliot', co-written and performed by Australian musicians Kevin Sullivan and Stuart Joel Nugget.
