= Sandover River =

Sandover
- Location of the Sandover River mouth in the Northern Territory
- Etymology: William Sandover

Location
- Country: Australia
- Territory: Northern Territory
- Region: Central Australia

Physical characteristics
- Source: Macdonnell Ranges
  - coordinates: 22°37′S 135°2′E
  - elevation: 534 m (1,752 ft)
- Mouth: confluence with the Georgina River in wetter seasons
  - location: near Urandangi
  - coordinates: 21°25′S 137°18′E
  - elevation: 285 m (935 ft)
- Length: 375 km (233 mi)

Basin features
- River system: Lake Eyre basin
- Tributaries
  - left: Mueller Creek, Athinna Creek, Arganara Creek, Bullock Creek, Centre Creek
  - right: Waite Creek, Bundey River

The Sandover River is an ephemeral river in the Northern Territory of Australia, in northeast Central Australia. It is the only major tributary of the Georgina River that does not rise in western Queensland. Instead it flows from the eastern Macdonnell Ranges, northward to enter the Georgina near Urandangi. The highest point in the catchment is Bald Hill at 996 metres (3,268 ft), but it enters the Georgina at altitudes below 200 metres (660 ft).

== Course and features ==
The ephemeral Sandover River is usually dry except when the northern monsoon moves unusually far south into the continent. The average annual rainfall in the catchment area is typically around 275 millimetres (10.8 in) but varies greatly: in dry years like 1928 the total may be as low as 50 millimetres (2.0 in), but in very wet years like 1974, 2000, 2001 and 2010, it can be as high as 760 millimetres (30 in). Most of this rain falls in the summer: between December and March monthly totals have on several occasions exceeded the mean annual rainfall. Flows in the Sandover often fail to reach the Georgina, instead drying out in waterholes well west of Urandangie. However, in very wet periods, such as 1920–1921, 1973-1977 and 1999–2001, water from the Sandover may not only reach the Georgina, but actually flow (via a circuitous route) into Lake Eyre in South Australia.

The river is reported as passing through the localities of Costello and Sandover. Both the Sandover Highway and the Sandover Stock Route are named after the river because their respective alignment follow that of the river.

== History ==
The river was named in 1878 after William Sandover, the then President of the Legislative Council of South Australia, reportedly by the explorer and botanist. Charles Winnecke.

== See also ==
- List of rivers of Australia § Northern Territory
- Sandover Highway
