= Creswell, Northern Territory =

Creswell Northern Territory
- Coordinates: 17°41′26″S 135°49′02″E
- Population: 45 (2016 census) (Note: For the 2016 census, the State Suburb of Creswell consisted of the locality of Creswell and some land in the adjoining locality of Mcarthur which is described as NT Portion 4152 and which is part of the Mallapunyah Springs pastoral lease.)
  - Density: 0.001594/km^{2} (0.00413/sq mi)
- Established: 4 April 2007
- Postcode(s): 0852
- Elevation: 218 m (715 ft)(weather station)
- Area: 28,237 km^{2} (10,902.4 sq mi)
- Time zone: ACST (UTC+9:30)
- Location: 933 km (580 mi) SE of Darwin
- LGA(s): Barkly Region
- Territory electorate(s): Barkly
- Federal division(s): Lingiari
Mean max temp	Mean min temp	Annual rainfall
33.5 °C; 92 °F	18.7 °C; 66 °F	419.3 mm 16.5 in
Suburbs around Creswell:
Mcarthur	Mcarthur	Calvert
Pamayu	Creswell	Nicholson
Tablelands	Tablelands; Nicholson	Nicholson
- Footnotes: Adjoining localities

Creswell is a locality in the Northern Territory of Australia located in the territory's east adjoining the border with the state of Queensland about 933 kilometres (580 mi) south-east of the territory capital of Darwin.

The locality consists of the following land (from west to east, then north to south):

1. Eva Springs pastoral lease,
2. Anthony Lagoon pastoral lease,
3. Mallapunyah Springs and Walhallow pastoral leases,
4. Cresswell Downs pastoral lease and,
5. Benmara pastoral lease.

As of 2020, it has an area of 28,237 square kilometres (10,902 sq mi).

The locality's boundaries and name were gazetted on 4 April 2007. Its name is derived from the Creswell pastoral lease and ultimately from Cresswell Creek named by the explorer, Ernest Favenc.

The 2016 Australian census which was conducted in August 2016 reports that Creswell had a population of 45.

Creswell is located within the federal division of Lingiari, the territory electoral division of Barkly and the local government area of the Barkly Region.
