= Alpurrurulam, Northern Territory =

Alpurrurulam
- Town
- Coordinates: 20°59′02″S 137°50′11″E
- Country: Australia
- State: Northern Territory
- LGA: Barkly Region
- Location: 1,206 km (749 mi) SE of Darwin; 638 km (396 mi) E of Tennant Creek

Government
  - Territory electorate: Barkly
  - Federal division: Lingiari

Area
  - Total: 9.9 km^{2} (3.8 sq mi)

Population
  - Total: 350 (2021 census)
  - Density: 35.4/km^{2} (91.6/sq mi)
- Time zone: UTC+9:30 (ACST)
- Postcode: 4825
- Mean max temp: 32.9 °C (91.2 °F)
- Mean min temp: 17.7 °C (63.9 °F)
- Annual rainfall: 398.9 mm (15.70 in)
Localities around Alpurrurulam
Costello	Costello	Costello
Costello	Alpurrurulam	Costello
Costello	Costello	Costello

Alpurrurulam, from the original Aboriginal name Ilperrelhelame, also known as Lake Nash, is a locality in the Northern Territory of Australia located in the territory's east about 1,206 kilometres (749 mi) south-east of the territory capital of Darwin and about 570.1 kilometres (354.2 mi) east of the municipal seat of Tennant Creek and about 17 kilometres (11 mi) from the border with the state of Queensland. The town is at the end of the Sandover Highway, which floods each year during the wet season and cuts all road access to the community.

== History ==
The waterhole known as Lake Nash to European settlers was used by Aboriginal peoples for millennia, and was called Ilperrelhelame in the Alyawarre language. It has many Dreaming legends attached to it, and the local Alyawarre people lived in a traditional way, hunting and foraging and performing their ceremonies until 1920.

Alpurrurulam grew out of disagreement between the owners of Lake Nash Station and the Aboriginal people living near the Georgina River, many of whom worked at the cattle station. In the early 1980s it was planned to move the community to Bathurst Downs, which was regarded as “poison country” by the local Alyawarre. In 1982 the community requested some land of their own near the station, addressing the then Chief Minister of the Northern Territory Government. After a legal battle, 10 square kilometres (3.9 sq mi) was excised from the pastoral lease of the 12,000-square-kilometre (3×10^{6}-acre) Lake Nash Station and given back in 1983, forming what is now Alpurrurulam. The Alpurrurulam Land Aboriginal Corporation (ALAC), a board of community elders, was established as landowner.

The Alpurrurulam Community Government Council (CGC) was the local government authority until 1 July 2008, when there was an amalgamation of councils into a new shire framework and the town was absorbed into the Barkly Shire.

== Governance and population ==
Alpurrurulam is located within the federal division of Lingiari, the territory electoral division of Barkly and the local government area of the Barkly Region, in the ward of Alpurrurulam.

The town is usually called Alpurrurulam or Lake Nash. The town is mostly referred to as Lake Nash colloquially, and for mail delivery (via Mount Isa), and Alpurrurulam for all official matters, such as a census.

The 2021 Australian census which was conducted in August 2021 reports that Alpurrurulam had a population of 350 people of whom 335 (95.7%) identified as being Aboriginal and/or Torres Strait Islander people.

The people of Alpurrurulam have close historical ties with the people of Ampilatwatja, in Utopia.

== Facilities ==
Services include the Barkly Regional Council Alpurrurulam Service Centre, aged care facilities, night patrol, sport and recreation, Centrelink, a post office, the Warte Alparayetye community-owned store, Alpurrurulam Community School (to Year 9), and the Rainbow Gateway, a new community development program. Lake Nash AFC are the town's Australian rules football club that plays in the AFL Mount Isa league in Queensland, it has a men's team known as the Young Guns and a women's team known as the Giants.

There is an airstrip, with planes departing for Mt Isa for health appointments once a week, and a special mail plane on Fridays.

A wind farm and a solar farm with hybrid solar-diesel power system, were installed in 2011–2012.

== Notable people ==
- Elkin Reilly, Australian rules footballer (first Northern Territorian in the AFL)
