= Hart, Northern Territory =

Hart Northern Territory
- Coordinates: 23°02′06″S 135°06′29″E
- Population: 169 (2016 census)
  - Density: 0.009306/km^{2} (0.02410/sq mi)
- Established: 4 April 2007
- Postcode(s): 0872
- Elevation: 661 m (2,169 ft)(weather station)
- Area: 18,161 km^{2} (7,012.0 sq mi)
- Time zone: ACST (UTC+9:30)
- Location: 1,259 km (782 mi) S of Darwin
- LGA(s): Central Desert Region
- Territory electorate(s): Namatjira
- Federal division(s): Lingiari
Mean max temp	Mean min temp	Annual rainfall
28.8 °C; 84 °F	13.2 °C; 56 °F	297.3 mm 11.7 in
Suburbs around Hart:
Anmatjere	Anmatjere; Sandover	Anatye
Anmatjere; Burt Plain	Hart	Anatye
Burt Plain	Hale; Anatye	Anatye
- Footnotes: Adjoining localities

Hart is a locality in the Northern Territory of Australia located in the territory's south-east about 1,259 kilometres (782 mi) south of the territory capital of Darwin.

The locality consists of the following land (from west to east, then north to south):

1. Delny and McDonald Downs (south part) pastoral leases, the Dulcie Range National Park and the Dneiper and Jinka pastoral leases,
2. The Mount Riddock Station pastoral lease and the southern parts of the Dneiper and Jinka pastoral leases, and
3. The Garden pastoral lease, the Trephina Gorge Nature Park, and the Ambalindum and Indiana pastoral leases

It fully surrounds the community of Atitjere. As of 2020, it has an area of 18,161 square kilometres (7,012 sq mi).

The locality's boundaries and name were gazetted on 4 April 2007. Its name is derived from the Harts Range which was itself named in 1870 after John Hart who served as the Premier of South Australia for three terms between 1865 and 1871.

The 2016 Australian census which was conducted in August 2016 reports that Hart had a population of 169 of which 107 (61.8%) identified as “Aboriginal and/or Torres Strait Islander people.”

Hart is located within the federal division of Lingiari, the territory electoral division of Namatjira and the local government area of the Central Desert Region.
