= Jingulu =

Jingulu may refer to:

- Jingulu people, an ethnic group of Australia
- Jingulu language, an Australian language
