= Anna's Reservoir Conservation Reserve =

Protected area in the Northern Territory, Australia

- IUCN category V (protected landscape/seascape)
- Location within Northern Territory
- Location: Northern Territory, Anmatjere
- Coordinates: 22°38′00″S 133°09′00″E
- Area: 85 ha (210 acres)
- Established: 1971
- Governing body: Parks and Wildlife Commission of the Northern Territory

Anna's Reservoir Conservation Reserve is a protected area in the Northern Territory of Australia.

It is located approximately 165 kilometres (103 mi) north of Alice Springs and is within the boundaries of Aileron Station.

The traditional owners of the area are the Anmatyerre people.

The first European to visit the area was John McDouall Stuart in April 1860 while on expedition through the area. Stuart named the rock-hole after the youngest daughter of James Chambers, who had sponsored the expedition. Stuart visited the rock-hole on his next three attempts to reach the north coast of Australia. Other travellers and the builders of the Overland Telegraph Line all used the reservoir for water.

Alfred Giles made use of the reservoir when overlanding 4,000 cattle and 8,000 sheep to establish Springvale Station near Katherine in 1879.

In 1980, the conservation reserve was listed on the now-defunct Register of the National Estate. In 1995, it was listed on the Northern Territory Heritage Register.

The conservation reserve is categorised as an IUCN Category III protected area.

== See also ==
- Protected areas of the Northern Territory
