= Anatye, Northern Territory =

Anatye
- Suburb
- Coordinates: 23°03′50″S 136°49′44″E
- Country: Australia
- State: Northern Territory
- LGA: Central Desert Region
- Location: 1,307 km (812 mi) S of Darwin
- Established: 4 April 2007

Government
  - Territory electorate: Namatjira
  - Federal division: Lingiari

Area
  - Total: 45,033 km^{2} (17,387 sq mi)
- Elevation (weather station): 328 m (1,076 ft)

Population
  - Total: 160 (2021 census)
  - Density: 0.00355/km^{2} (0.00920/sq mi)
- Time zone: UTC+9:30 (ACST)
- Postcode: 0872
- Mean max temp: 31.0 °C (87.8 °F)
- Mean min temp: 14.6 °C (58.3 °F)
- Annual rainfall: 286.9 mm (11.30 in)
Suburbs around Anatye
Sandover	Sandover; Costello	Queensland
Sandover; Hart; Hale	Anatye	Queensland
Hale	Hale; Simpson	Queensland

Anatye is a locality in the Northern Territory of Australia located in the territory's east adjoining the border with the state of Queensland about 1,307 kilometres (812 mi) south of the territory capital of Darwin.

The locality consists of the following land (from north to south, then west to east):

1. Lucy Creek and Manners Creek pastoral leases
2. Jervois and Tarlton Downs pastoral leases, the Anatye Aboriginal Land Trust (i.e. NT Portion 1815), and the Marqua and Tobermorey pastoral leases
3. The remainder of the land in the Anatye Aboriginal Land Trust.

As of 2020, it has an area of 45,033 square kilometres (17,387 sq mi).

The locality's boundaries and name were gazetted on 4 April 2007. Its name is derived from the Anatye Aboriginal Land Trust which was established in 1991 initially in respect to land described as NT Portion 1815 located on the Plenty Highway and previously used as an "Animal Industry Branch research block".

The 2021 Australian census which was conducted in August 2021 reports that Anatye had a population of 160 of which 67 (41.9%) identified as Aboriginal and/or Torres Strait Islander people.

Anatye is located within the federal division of Lingiari, the territory electoral division of Namatjira and the local government area of the Central Desert Region.
