= Jingili =

Jingili may refer to:

- Jingili people, an ethnic group of Australia
- Jingili language, an Australian language
- Jingili, Northern Territory, a suburb of Darwin, Australia
- Electoral division of Jingili, a former Australian electoral division
