= Ryan Well Historical Reserve =

Protected area in the Northern Territory, Australia

- Location within Northern Territory
- Location: Northern Territory, Anmatjere
- Nearest city: Alice Springs
- Coordinates: 22°43′07″S 133°23′04″E
- Area: 2.39 ha (5.9 acres)
- Established: 30 September 1971
- Governing body: Parks and Wildlife Commission of the Northern Territory

Ryan Well Historical Reserve, formerly Reserve No. 1343, is a protected area in the Northern Territory of Australia located in the locality of Anmatjere about 129 kilometres (80 mi) north of Alice Springs.

The historical reserve consists of two parcels of land located on opposite sides of the Stuart Highway and its road reserve. The parcel on the west side of the highway contains the remains of Ryan Well, a well excavated in the 19th century to provide water to livestock moving along the Overland Telegraph Line, and a car park while the parcel on the east side of the highway contains the remains of a building known as the Glen Maggie Homestead.

It first acquired protected area status as a "a place of historic interest" declared under section 103 of the Crown Lands Ordinance 1931-1971 on 30 April 1974 by the Australian government in respect to the western parcel of land and was given the name Reserve No. 1343. On 3 May 1974, the eastern parcel of land was added to the reserve. On 30 June 1978, it was declared as Reserve No 1343 (Ryan Well Historical Reserve) under the Territory Parks and Wildlife Act and on 10 September 1979, it was renamed as Ryan Well Historical Reserve.

In 1980, it was described as follows:

Ryan's Well is significant as one of the surviving wells dug by overland telegraph teams to provide water for men working on the telegraph and for stock driven to provide meat for telegraph staff. Glen Maggie clearly demonstrates the characteristics of a vernacular structure built of local materials…

Ryan's Well was dug in 1889 and is 96 feet deep. It is substantially timbered. A windlass, camel whip, buckets, 10,000 gallon tank and 100 feet of trough were originally on site. A large stone surround was built at the top of the well. Today all that remains on site is the well and the stone surround. Glen Maggie Homestead was built in 1917 of local stone, with local timber for the door and window frames. In 1932 it served as a Post Office and turning-off point for The Granites gold rush. The building was abandoned about 1933…

The historical reserve was listed on the now-defunct Register of the National Estate on 21 October 1980 and on the Northern Territory Heritage Register on 18 February 1995. As of 2016, it had not given an International Union for Conservation of Nature protected area category.

Ryan Well was the destination of one of the survivors of a plane crash on Woodgreen Station in September 1935, when a General Aircraft Monospar ST-12 operated by Australian Transcontinental Airways (ATA) suffered engine failure, and made an emergency landing on the property. The pilot and his two passengers all survived, in difficult circumstances.

== See also ==
- Protected areas of the Northern Territory
