= Mount Skinner =

Mount Skinner may refer to:

- Mount Skinner (Antarctica), a mountain in Antarctica
- Mount Skinner, Northern Territory, a mountain in the Northern Territory of Australia
- Mount Skinner Station, a cattle station in the Northern Territory of Australia
