= Beetaloo Jangari Bill =

Australian Aboriginal elder (c. 1910–1983)

- Born: c. 1915; Beetaloo Station, Northern Territory
- Died: 1986; Elliott, Northern Territory

Beetaloo Jangari Bill or Wirinykari / Weingari (c. 1915 – 1986) was an Australian Warumungu and Gurindji man who worked as a labourer and became an elder of his people. His knowledge of Aboriginal traditions was used to assist numerous groups in successful land claims in 1980 and 1983.

Bill had a broad and deep knowledge of Aboriginal law which was matched with an 'easy familiarity' with Europeans.

== Life in the Northern Territory ==
The exact date of Bill's birth is unclear and is likely to have been between 1910 and 1915 and his European name 'Beetaloo' is derived from Beetaloo Station where he was born. He was the son of Roderick Jampin (Mirilkari), a Warumungu man, and Clara Parrangali Nawurla who was Gurindji and he was the eldest of several children. His Aboriginal name was Wirinykari (Weingari).

Growing up Bill's first language was the Warumungu language, ⁣⁣ but he also learned to speak, and was proficient in the Mudburra, Warlmanpa, Warlpiri and Jingulu languages; he could also understand the Gurindji language of his mother.

Bill went through Aboriginal initiation in 1930, 'the year that Phar Lap won the Melbourne Cup' and as a young man he married Jessie (Jersey) Karnangkurrngali Nampijinpa.

During World War II Bill worked from the Department of the Army at staging camps along the Stuart Highway, based primarily from Elliott and, after the war he continued to be employed, in similar work maintaining government bores on stock routes, by the Northern Territory Department of Works. In this role he received full award wages, which was unusual for an Aboriginal man of his era when equal wages were not mandatory. In this role, he became a well-known figure at cattle stations and droving camps; including along the Murranji Track. As recorded by Mary Alice Ward, in her Banka Banka Station journals he would often drop by for supplies and, her entry for 16 December 1961 read, "Beetaloo Bill came early for petrol and watermelons". Later he became a member of the Amalgamated Engineering Union from 1975. He was eventually able to retire on superannuation.

He was one of the first Aboriginal people in the region to buy a car, a Holden Ute, from his savings and was known to trade vehicles regularly. When asked why he had wanted to purchase a car he said "I had always wanted my own vehicle to carry my family around" and, when questioned about where the money from the car had come from by the car dealer he told them "[t]here's more where that lot came from". He would often 'run out' of petrol when near a camp or cattle station where he knew he would be welcome.

He formally married his second wife Biddy Judambi Nimarra in Elliott on 3 December 1961. They raised a family in a small settlement just north-west of Elliott and when, in February 1962, the Northern Territory government decided to transfer his daughter Nita Nabada (9 years old), and four other children, from the school they had been bused 36 miles (58 km) to daily at Newcastle Waters to Elliott Primary School, which was much closer to home, Bill became a vocal advocate for the move. Bill did this in response to a boycott and signed petition started by some of the 'European' parents, primarily due to supposed 'health concerns' with many parents advocating that separate toilets and water taps would have to be built at the school; others stated that they would prefer to remove their children and send them to school in Alice Springs, almost 750 kilometres (470 mi) away, then see the school be assimilated.

Bill defended Nita, and the other children, and told the journalist Frank Hardy that he wanted her to be able to read and write and that he `would not take her away from the school no matter what happened’. The school was integrated after the then Administrator Roger Nott appealed to the Elliott parents to give the new system a fair trial.

In the early 1960s, Bill was not a citizen, as this predated the 1967 Australian referendum and, when asked if, as a current ward of the government, he would like citizenship he said that:

I would accept citizenship so long as I could continue to live as an [Aboriginal person]. If they want to take my corroborees from me and prevent me from living with my people I am not interested. The Kuna-pipi, through which we worship our creator, the Earth Mother, the Mundiwa, and other ceremonials are part of my life. I could not live without them. They are in my heart and will be there always.

— Beetaloo Jangari Bill, as quoted in The Dawn, December 1962

== Death ==
He died on 29 September 1983 at Elliott.
