= Alan Powell (historian) =

Australian historian (1936–2020)

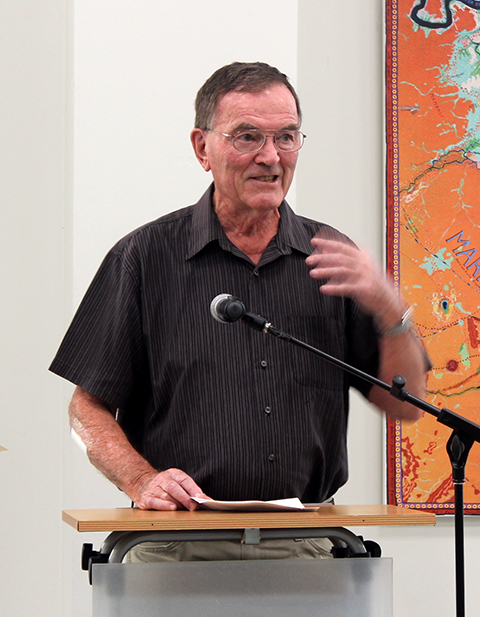
Emeritus Professor Alan Powell speaking at Northern Territory Library

Alan Walter Powell (7 January 1936 – 25 November 2020) was a historian and author of Northern Territory history.

== Career ==
Alan Powell was the Dean of the Arts Faculty at the Northern Territory University, now Charles Darwin University, and later Emeritus Professor of History and Political Science at CDU.

He was the editor of the Journal of Northern Territory History. He also edited publications for the Historical Society of the Northern Territory.

In 2013 he was made a fellow of the Federation of Australian Historical Societies.

He was a charter member of the Rotary Club of Darwin Sunrise. Powell lived in Darwin, and was married with two daughters and one son.

== Publications ==
- 1977 – Patrician Democrat: The Political Life of Charles Cowper, 1843–1870
- 1978 – John Lort Stokes and the crew of the Beagle
- 1982 – Far Country: A Short History of the Northern Territory
- 1986 – John Stokes and the Men of the Beagle: Discoverers of Port Darwin
- 1988 – The Shadow's Edge: Australia's Northern War
- 1995 – War by Stealth: Australians and the Allied Intelligence Bureau, 1942–1945
- 2003 – The Third Force: ANGAU's New Guinea War 1942–1946
- 2010 – Northern Voyages: Australia's Monsoon Coast in Maritime History
- 2015 – Desert Country: A History of Newhaven
- 2016 – Blood and Sand: Alyawarra and Cattlemen in the Sandover River Country
- 2016 – World's End: British Military Outposts in the Ring Fence Around Australia 1842–1849
- 2018 – Forgotten Country: A Short History of Central Australia
