= Anatye =

Anatye may refer to:

- Eastern Arrernte word for the Northern Australian plant, Ipomoea costata
- Anatye, Northern Territory, a locality in Australia
- Anatye Aboriginal Land Trust, an area of aboriginal-owned land in the locality of Anatye, Northern Territory
