= Central Desert Region =

- Local government area
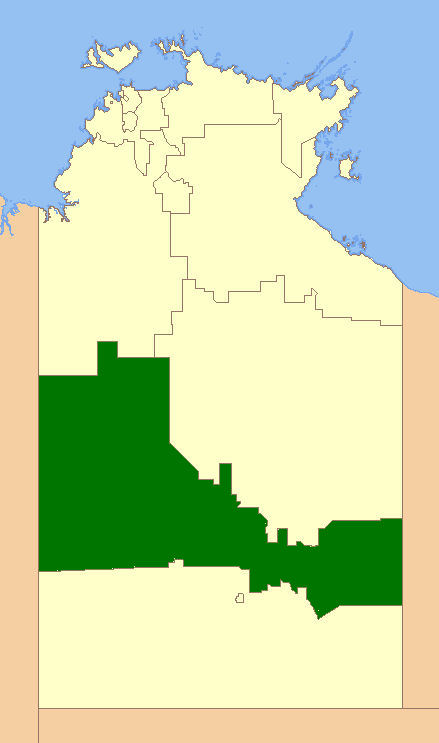

- Interactive map of Central Desert Region
- Coordinates: 26.5931°S 118.4911°E
- Country: Australia
- State: Northern Territory
- Region: Alice Springs Region
- Established: 2008
- Council seat: Alice Springs (outside LGA)

Government
  - Territory electorate: Stuart
  - Federal division: Lingiari

Area
  - Total: 281,312 km^{2} (108,615 sq mi)

Population
  - Total: 4,208 (2018)
  - Density: 0.0149585/km^{2} (0.038742/sq mi)
- Website: Central Desert Region
LGAs around Central Desert Region
Halls Creek	Victoria Daly; Barkly	Mount Isa
Halls Creek	Central Desert Region	Boulia
Halls Creek	MacDonnell	Diamantina

The Central Desert Region is a local government area of the Northern Territory, Australia, administered by the Central Desert Regional Council (formerly Central Desert Shire). The council's main towns are Ti-Tree, Yuendumu, and Lajamanu. The Region covers an area of 281,312 square kilometres (108,615 sq mi) and had a population of 4,208 in June 2018.

== History ==
In October 2006 the Northern Territory Government announced the reform of local government areas. The intention of the reform was to improve and expand the delivery of services to towns and communities across the Northern Territory by establishing eleven new Shires. The Central Desert Shire was created on 1 July 2008.

Elections of councillors were held on 25 October 2008. The President (Mayor) of the Central Desert Regional Council is Adrian Dixon and the Deputy President is Warren Williams since 28 August 2017.

Much of the council's area had been unincorporated, and several Community Government Councils were merged into the Central Desert Region. These were:

- Anmatjere CGC
- Arltarlpilta CGC
- Lajamanu CGC
- Yuendumu CGC

Changes to the NT Local Government Legislation in 2013 changed the names of Shire to Regional Councils and thus the Central Desert Shire became the Central Desert Regional Council with effect from 1 January 2014.

== Wards ==
The Central Desert Regional Council is divided into four wards, which is governed by 12 councillors:

- Northern Tanami (2)
- Southern Tanami (4)
- Anmatjere (4)
- Akityarre (2)

== Localities and communities ==
Land within the Central Desert Region was divided in 2007 into bounded areas for the purpose of creating an address for a property. The bounded areas are called "localities", with those localities associated with Aboriginal communities being called "communities".

=== Localities ===
- Anatye
- Anmatjere (part)
- Chilla Well
- Gurindji
- Hart
- Lake Mackay (part)
- Sandover (part)
- Tanami
- Ti-Tree

=== Communities ===
- Atitjere
- Engawala
- Lajamanu
- Laramba
- Nyirripi
- Willowra
- Wilora
- Yuelamu
- Yuendumu
