= Anmatjere, Northern Territory =

Anmatjere
- Suburb
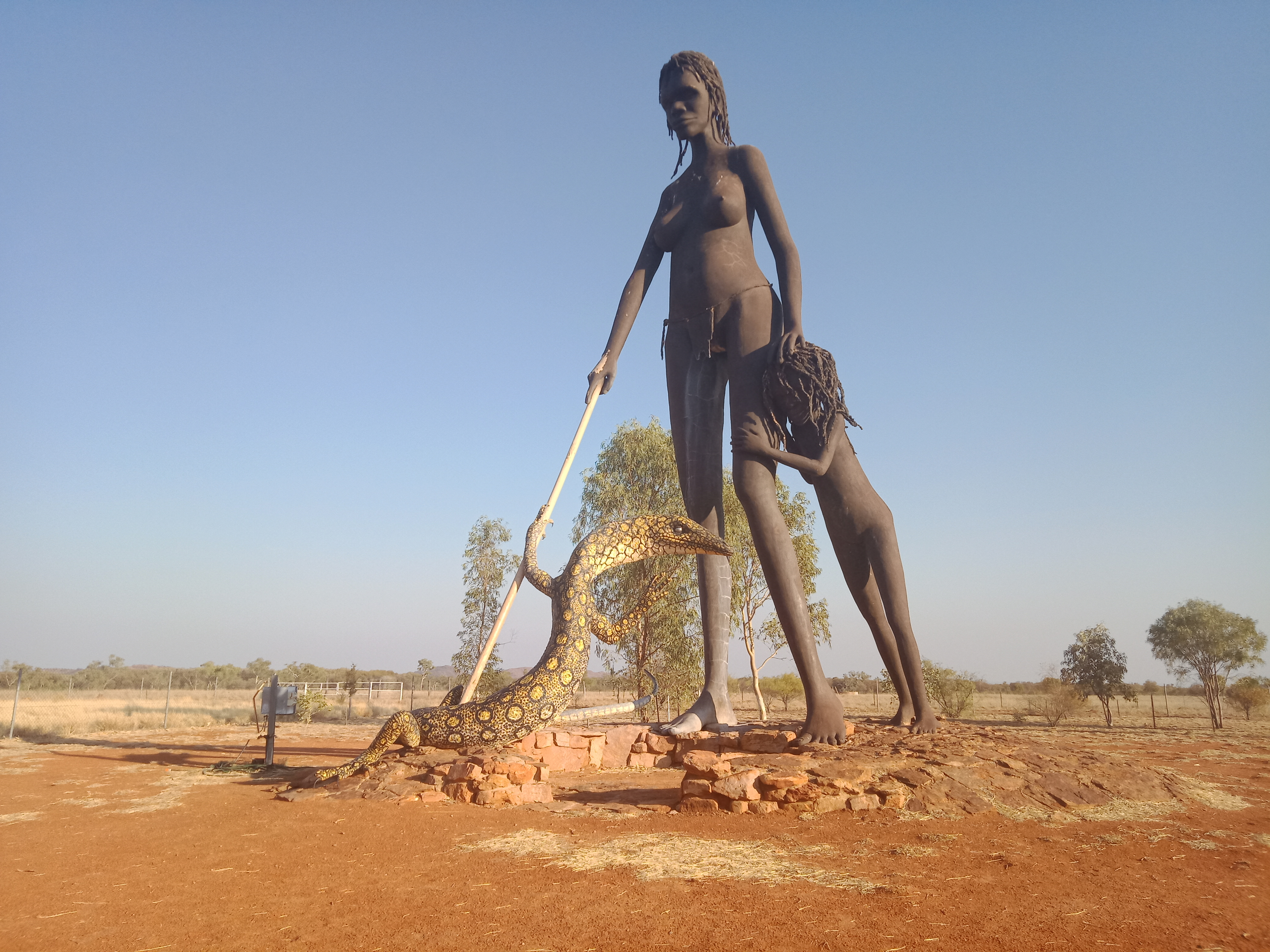
- Sculpture at the Aileron Roadhouse on the Stuart Highway

- Coordinates: 21°44′47″S 133°19′08″E
- Country: Australia
- State: Northern Territory
- LGAs: Barkly Region; Central Desert Region
- Location: 1,088 km (676 mi) S of Darwin City
- Established: 4 April 2007

Government
  - Territory electorate: Stuart
  - Federal division: Lingiari

Area
  - Total: 54,462 km^{2} (21,028 sq mi)
- Elevation (weather station): 566 m (1,857 ft)

Population
  - Total: 446 (2021 census) (Note: For the 2021 census, the population of the State Suburb of Anmatjere (whose boundaries align with those of the locality of Anmatjere), does not include the population of the following communities which are fully surrounded by the locality – Engawala, Laramba, Ti-Tree, Willora, Willowra and Yuelamu)
  - Density: 0.008189/km^{2} (0.021210/sq mi)
- Time zone: UTC+9:30 (ACST)
- Postcode: 0872
- Mean max temp: 31.0 °C (87.8 °F)
- Mean min temp: 14.4 °C (57.9 °F)
- Annual rainfall: 315.8 mm (12.43 in)
Suburbs around Anmatjere
Tanami	Warumunga; Davenport	Sandover
Lake Mackay; Chilla Well	Anmatjere	Sandover; Hart
Mount Zeil	Mount Zeil; Burt Plain; Hart	Hart

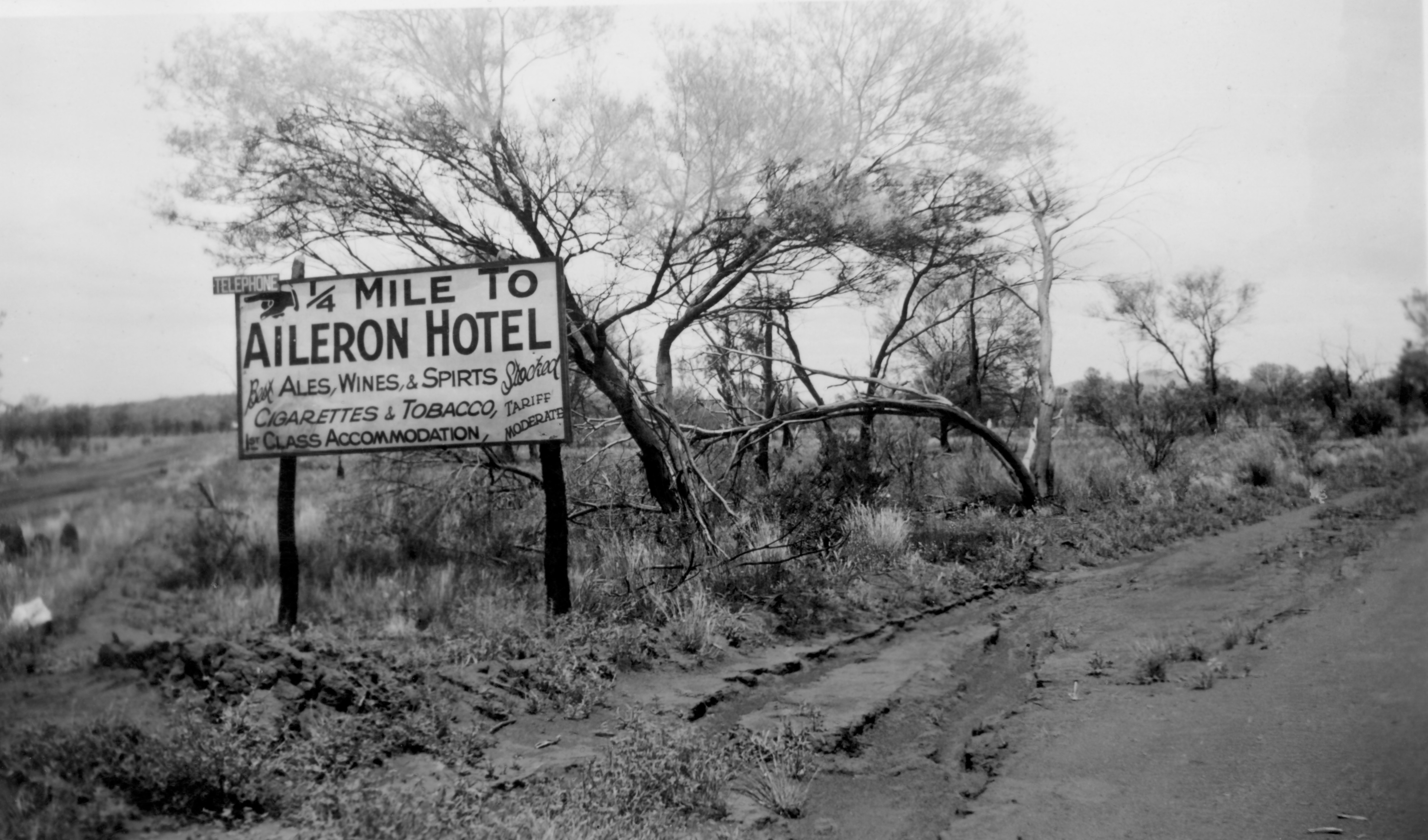
A sign to Aileron as pictured in the 1940s

Anmatjere is a locality in the Northern Territory of Australia located about 1,088 kilometres (676 mi) south of the territory capital of Darwin.

== History ==
The locality's boundaries and name were gazetted on 4 April 2007. Its name is derived from the Anmatjere Community Government Council, the local government body based in Ti Tree that operated from 1993 until 1 July 2008, when it was merged into the Central Desert Shire, now the Central Desert Regional Council. Anmatjere is one spelling of Anmatyerr, the name of the Aboriginal people and language of the area.

== Governance and demographics ==
Anmatjere is located within the federal division of Lingiari, the territory electoral division of Stuart and the local government areas of the Barkly Shire and the Central Desert Region.

The 2021 Australian census reports that Anmatjere had 446 people living within its boundaries, of whom 50.7% were male, 49.3% were female and 76.5% identified as Aboriginal and/or Torres Strait Islander people.

== Sites and attractions ==
The following sites located within Anmatjere are listed on the Northern Territory Heritage Register:

- Aileron Homestead No. 1
- Alcoota Fossil Beds
- Anna's Reservoir Conservation Reserve
- Old Mount Riddock Homestead – Gemtree
- Ryan Well Historical Reserve

The homestead of Woodgreen Station, also known as Atartinga, is situated within Anmatjere.

Mount Skinner, a mountain, is within Anmatjere. The Ediacaran-aged fossil known as Skinnera is named for its discovery at from three sites near Mount Skinner. Mount Skinner Station, a station of around 2,860 km^{2} (1,100 sq mi) in extent, is located approximately 160–200 km (99–124 mi) north of Alice Springs on the Sandover Highway. The property was established in 1952 by John "Jock" Nelson, a Labor MP who served in the Australian House of Representatives for 17 years. The Nelson and Barber families held the pastoral lease on the property until 2019, when a South Australian family acquired the station. At that time it had around 2,500 Poll Hereford cattle.

As of 2020, anthropologists' work is continuing on both Woodgreen and Mount Skinner pastoral leases as the basis for any future native title claims, under the auspices of the Central Land Council.

Two sculptures, Anmatjere Man and Anmatjere Woman and Child, are located at the Aileron roadhouse.
