= Wutungurra, Northern Territory =

Wutunugurra Northern Territory
- Coordinates: 20°27′46.8″S 135°15′3.6″E
- Population: 143 (2021 census)
- Postcode(s): 0872
- LGA(s): Barkly Region
- Territory electorate(s): Barkly
- Federal division(s): Lingiari

Wutunugurra is a small community in the Northern Territory of Australia. It is located 209.8 kilometres (130.4 mi) south-east of Tennant Creek. It has a population of 143 according to the 2021 census and is on the country of the Alyawarr people.
