= Wilora, Northern Territory =

Wilora
- Town
- Coordinates: 21°44′21″S 133°43′48″E
- Country: Australia
- State: Northern Territory

Population
  - Total: 95 (2016 census)
- Time zone: UTC+9:30 (ACST)
- Postcode: 0872

Wilora is a small town in the Northern Territory, Australia, located 251 kilometres (156 mi) north of Alice Springs. Its altitude is 484.38 metres (1,589.2 ft).

Wilora had a population of 95 at the 2016 census. It falls within the local government area of the Central Desert Regional Council, the governing land council is the Central Land Council.
