= Frederick Renner =

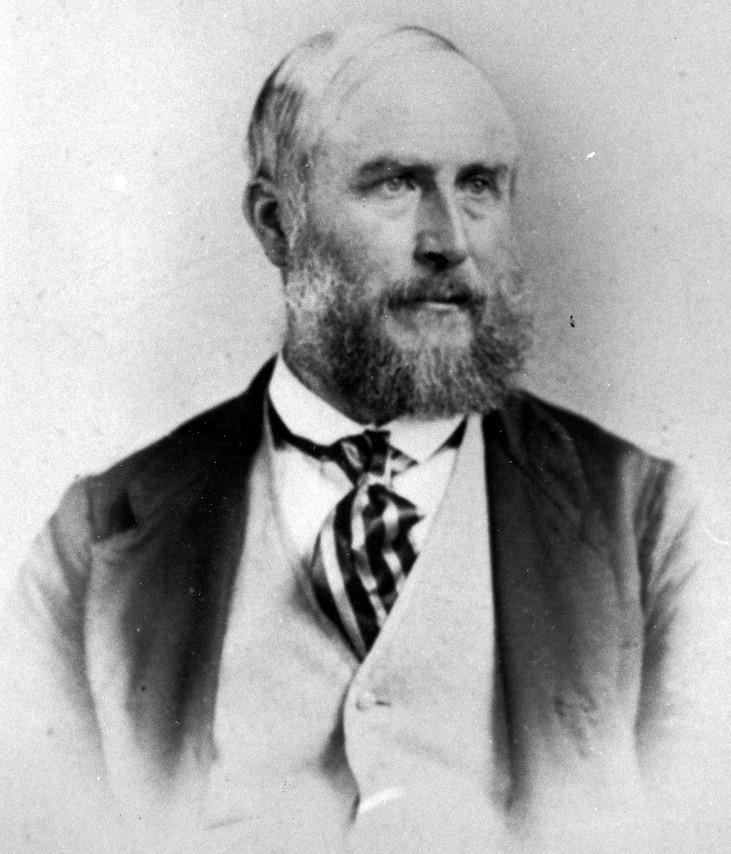

Frederich Emil Renner (1821–1893) was a doctor who dispensed medical advice to the team working on the Australian Overland Telegraph Line in the Northern Territory of South Australia. His practice extended from Port Augusta to the Roper River, a distance of approximately 2,600 kilometres (1,600 mi).

Renner Springs, a spring was named after him in 1872. In 1877, Dr. Renner saw a flock of birds while working on the Telegraph Line and found that the birds were drawn to the area by the natural springs.

== Personal life ==
Frederich Emil Renner was born on in Jena, Germany 14 October 1821. and died on 30 January 1893. He was married to Annie Buchanan Davie. They had eight children. Their fourth child was named Frederick August Renner who married Mary Agnes Muir in Albany, WA on 30 October 1889. Mary Muir was a member of the Muir family, which arrived in Western Australia in 1844.

Frederich Renner's father was Theobald Renner (b. Bremen 1779, d. Jena 1850) a professor for veterinary medicine in Jena, Germany. His great-grandfather was Caspar Friedrich Renner an administration servant and poet in Bremen, Germany.

Frederich Renner was registered on 18 July 1848 as one of the earliest doctors to appear in the Medical Register of South Australia. Dr Renner qualified at the University of Jena. He worked as a doctor at Wentworth, NSW from 1857 until the floods in 1870. In 1870 he returned to Adelaide where he was appointed medical officer to the Overland Telegraph construction parties.

== Diaries ==
In the early 1980s, Jose Petrick, a well-known historian in the Alice Springs area, was awarded a government grant to transcribe the diaries of Dr. Renner. The diaries were published in 1983 as The Renner Diaries.
