= Kulumindini Band =

- Origin: Elliott, Northern Territory, Australia
- Genre: rock
- Label: Marlinja Music
- Members: Mark Raymond Jimija; Elisabeth Dixon Namija; Sam Sandy Janama; Robert Dixon; Gregory Jackson Jabarda; Jason Bill Jangari; Kurrabadi; Kerry Gardiner

Kulumindini Band are an aboriginal rock band from Elliott, Northern Territory. They are named after a Jingili dreaming site. The members are Jingili-Mudbura people and they sing in both Mudbura and English. In 2008 they were inducted into the hall of fame at the NT Indigenous Music Awards.

== Discography ==
- Marlinja Music
- You're Not Useless (1993)
- History (1995)
