= Elkin Reilly =

Australian rules footballer (1939–2020)

Personal information
- Born: 2 April 1939; Alpurrurulam, Northern Territory
- Died: 3 September 2020 (aged 82); Adelaide, South Australia
- Original team: Wentworth (SFL)
- Debut: 19 May 1962, South Melbourne vs. Fitzroy, at Lake Oval

Playing career^{1}
Years	Club	Games (Goals)
1962–1966	South Melbourne	51 (2)
- ^{1} Playing statistics correct to the end of 1966.

Career highlights

Elkin Reilly (2 April 1939 – 3 September 2020) was an Australian rules footballer, representing South Melbourne Football Club in the Victorian Football League (VFL). He was one of the earlier Australian Aboriginals to play in the VFL.

An Alyawarra man, Reilly was born in Alpurrurulam on the Northern Territory/Queensland border and, in line with government policy of the day, was kidnapped from his mother and taken to Alice Springs hospital.

At the hospital, Reilly was considered too ill to be placed with the other children and the doctor on duty, Dr Pat Reilly, agreed to adopt him and he and his wife Joan successfully applied to the Department of Native Affairs to remove Reilly from the Northern Territory in order to take him back to Adelaide.

Reilly attended the exclusive Rostrevor College in Adelaide and became a leading ruckman who after leaving Rostrevor played in various country leagues.

Reilly was a star in the country and won two Mail Medals in a row for being the best and fairest player in 1959 in the Southern Yorke Peninsula Football League while playing for Minlaton Football Club and in 1960 in the Upper Murray Riverland Football League with Barmera-Monash Football Club.

Recruited by South Melbourne from Sunraysia Football League club Wentworth in 1962, Reilly made his senior VFL debut in Round Five that season against Fitzroy Football Club at South Melbourne's home ground, the Lake Oval.

Over five seasons, Reilly played 51 games for South Melbourne, teaming with South's champion rover Bob Skilton to win matches "in an otherwise bleak period for the club", with one sports reporter claiming "Elkin Reilly is not a brilliant player but his spoiling tactics are an important feature of South's play."

A ruptured appendix ended Reilly's VFL career in 1966 and he moved to Cohuna in country Victoria to coach.

Rostrevor College has honoured Reilly by naming a hall and a scholarship for Indigenous students for him.

== Sources ==
- Main, J. (2009) In the Blood, BAS Publishing: Melbourne. ISBN 9 78192149601 1.
- Tatz, C. & Tatz, P. (2000) Black Gold, Aboriginal Studies Press, Canberra. ISBN 0 85575 367 6.
