= Arltarlpilta Community =

Arltarlpilta Community Northern Territory
- Coordinates: 23°04′S 134°34′E
  - Density: 312/km^{2} (810/sq mi)
- Established: 26 September 1997
- Abolished: 1 July 2008
- Area: 12.00 km^{2} (4.6 sq mi)
- Mayor: Tony Schaber
- Council seat: Atitjere
- Website: Arltarlpilta Community

The Arltarlpilta Community was a local government area in the Northern Territory of Australia. It is 215 kilometres (134 mi) northeast of Alice Springs by road.

Arltarlpilta Community came under the Local Government Act on 26 September 1997, combining the Atitjere, Mount Eaglebeak, Foxalls Wells, Irrelirre and Unpayekerke communities. On 1 July 2008, the community was merged into the Central Desert Shire, although the Community Government Council remained in existence as a Local Board, which meets at Atitjere.

Alcohol consumption is controlled in Arltarlpilta—it is a dry community.

== See also ==
- Local government areas of the Northern Territory
