= Tara, Northern Territory =

Tara Northern Territory
- Coordinates: 21°30′22.8018″S 133°59′44.754″E
- Population: 62 (2021 census)
- Postcode(s): 0872
- Location: 243 km (151 mi) N of Alice Springs
- LGA(s): Barkly Region
- Territory electorate(s): Barkly
- Federal division(s): Lingiari

Tara is an Aboriginal community in the Northern Territory of Australia, located about 243 km north of Alice Springs, on Kaytetye land. At the time of the 2021 census, it had a recorded population of 62.
