= Canteen Creek, Northern Territory =

Canteen Creek Northern Territory
- Coordinates: 20°38′41.3154″S 135°35′10.3308″E
- Population: 147 (2021 census)
- Postcode(s): 0872
- LGA(s): Barkly Region
- Territory electorate(s): Barkly
- Federal division(s): Lingiari

Canteen Creek, also known as Owairtilla, is an Aboriginal community in the Northern Territory of Australia, located about 183 km southeast of Tennant Creek, on Alyawarr land. At the time of the 2021 census, it had a population of 147. The community is accessible by road, and is also serviced by a small airstrip located about 500 metres northeast of the settlement. Community facilities include a general store, a church, a health centre, and a coeducational P-12 school.

Canteen Creek is a dry community, meaning no alcohol can be brought into the community.
