= Historical Society of the Northern Territory =

Organisation in the Northern Territory, Australia

Historical Society of the Northern Territory Incorporated
- Founded: 1964
- Type: Historical society; territorial peak body; incorporated association
- VAT ID no.: ABN: 88 971 560 498
- Registration no.: 00073C Associations Act (NT)
- Location: Darwin, Northern Territory, Australia
- Region served: Northern Territory, Australia
- Website: www.historicalsocietynt.org.au/index.htm

Journal of Northern Territory History
- Discipline: history
- Language: English

Publication details
- History: 1990–present
- Publisher: Historical Society of the Northern Territory Incorporated (Australia)
- Frequency: Annually

Standard abbreviations
- ISO 4: J. North. Territ. Hist.

Indexing
- ISSN: 1034-7488

Links
- Journal homepage

The Historical Society of the Northern Territory is a historical society founded in Darwin, Australia in 1964. Major objectives of the Society include (1) the study of the history of the Northern Territory of Australia; (2) encouraging the preservation of the Northern Territory's historical relics and records by their deposit with an appropriate national or local authority, but not with the Society (which does not maintain archives or collections); (3) promoting lectures, discussions, excursions and exhibitions relating to the history of the Northern Territory; and (4) providing an avenue for publishing on the history of the Northern Territory in the Society's journal or as an occasional paper or book.

The Society works with other historical societies and cultural organisations to advocate on behalf of the sector and to provide leadership and guidance.

The Society is the Northern Territory constituent member of the Federation of Australian Historical Societies

== History ==
The Society was formed in Darwin in 1964.

== Publications ==
The Society publishes a journal, newsletter and other publications.

== See also ==
- National Trust of Australia (Northern Territory)
- Northern Territory Heritage Register
