= Barkly Region =

Coordinates: 19.80367°S 135.5095°E

- Local government area
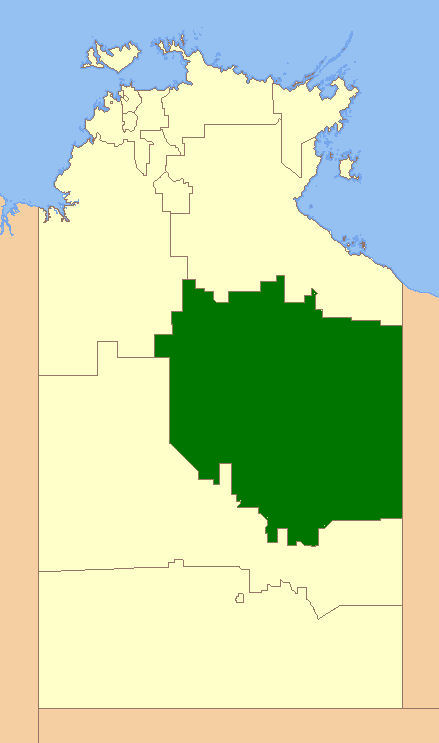

- Interactive map of Barkly Region
- Country: Australia
- State: Northern Territory
- Region: Barkly Tableland
- Established: 2008
- Council seat: Tennant Creek

Government
  - Mayor: Sid Vashit
  - Territory electorate: Barkly
  - Federal division: Lingiari

Area
  - Total: 322,713 km^{2} (124,600 sq mi)

Population
  - Total: 7,392 (2018)
  - Density: 0.0229058/km^{2} (0.059326/sq mi)
- Website: Barkly Region
LGAs around Barkly Region
Victoria Daly	Roper Gulf	Burke
Victoria Daly	Barkly Region	Mount Isa
Central Desert	Central Desert	Boulia

The Barkly Region, formerly Barkly Shire, is a local government area of the Northern Territory of Australia, administered by the Barkly Regional Council. The region's main town is Tennant Creek. The region covers an area of 322,713 square kilometres (124,600 sq mi) and had a population of almost 7,400 as at June 2018.

== History ==
In October 2006 the Northern Territory Government announced the reform of local government areas. The intention of the reform was to improve and expand the delivery of services to towns and communities across the Northern Territory by establishing eleven new shires. The Barkly Shire was created on 1 July 2008, as were the remaining ten shires. On 1 January 2014, it was renamed Barkly Region.

The Barkly Region is administered by the Barkly Regional Council.

The most recent elections of Councillors were held on 18 November 2024. The current President (Mayor) of the Region is Sid Vashist.

In 2019, a proposal was made to build a 15,000 ha (37,000-acre) solar farm in the region, which would become the world's largest solar energy project.

In 2021, the region had the lowest rate of vaccination against COVID-19 pandemic.

In June 2024, all members of the council were dismissed after an investigation into its management. A report by the Northern Territory government found the organisation had unmanaged conflicts of interest, breached the Local Government Act and had "serious deficiencies" in the conduct of council affairs.

== Council ==
Barkley Regional Council is governed by a Mayor and 12 councillors.

=== Current composition ===
The current council, elected in 2024 following an all-of-council dismissal is:

Electorate	Name	Party
Mayor	Sid Vashit	Independent
Alyawarr Ward	Noel Hayes	Independent
Alyawarr Ward	Andrew Tsavaris	Independent
Alyawarr Ward	Darryl Rex Morton	Independent
Alyawarr Ward	Zacieus Long	Independent
Patta Ward	Greg Marlow	Independent
Patta Ward	Sharen Lake	Independent
Patta Ward	Pennie Cowin	Independent
Patta Ward	Dianne Stokes	NT Greens
Patta Ward	Valda Napurrula Shannon	Independent
Kuwarrangu	Lennie Barton	Independent
Kuwarrangu	Ben Neade	Independent
Alpururrulam Ward	Valerie Campbell	Independent

=== Wards ===
The council is divided into 4 wards:

- Alyawarr Ward (South) (4)
- Patta Ward (West) (5)
- Kuwarrangu (until 2016 Yapakurlangu) (Northeast) (2)
- Alpururrulam Ward (Southeast) (1)

== Localities and communities ==
Land within the Barkly Region was divided during 2007 into bounded areas for the purpose of creating an address for a property. The bounded areas are called "localities", with those localities associated with Aboriginal communities being called "communities".

=== Localities ===
- Anmatjere (part)
- Costello
- Creswell
- Davenport
- Elliott
- Newcastle Waters
- Nicholson
- Pamayu
- Ranken
- Sandover (part)
- Tablelands
- Tanami East
- Tennant Creek
- Warumungu

=== Communities ===
- Ali Curung
- Alpurrurulam
- Ampilatwatja
- Canteen Creek
- Tara
- Wutungurra

== Sister cities ==
- Uintah County, Utah, United States
