= Newcastle Waters =

- Town
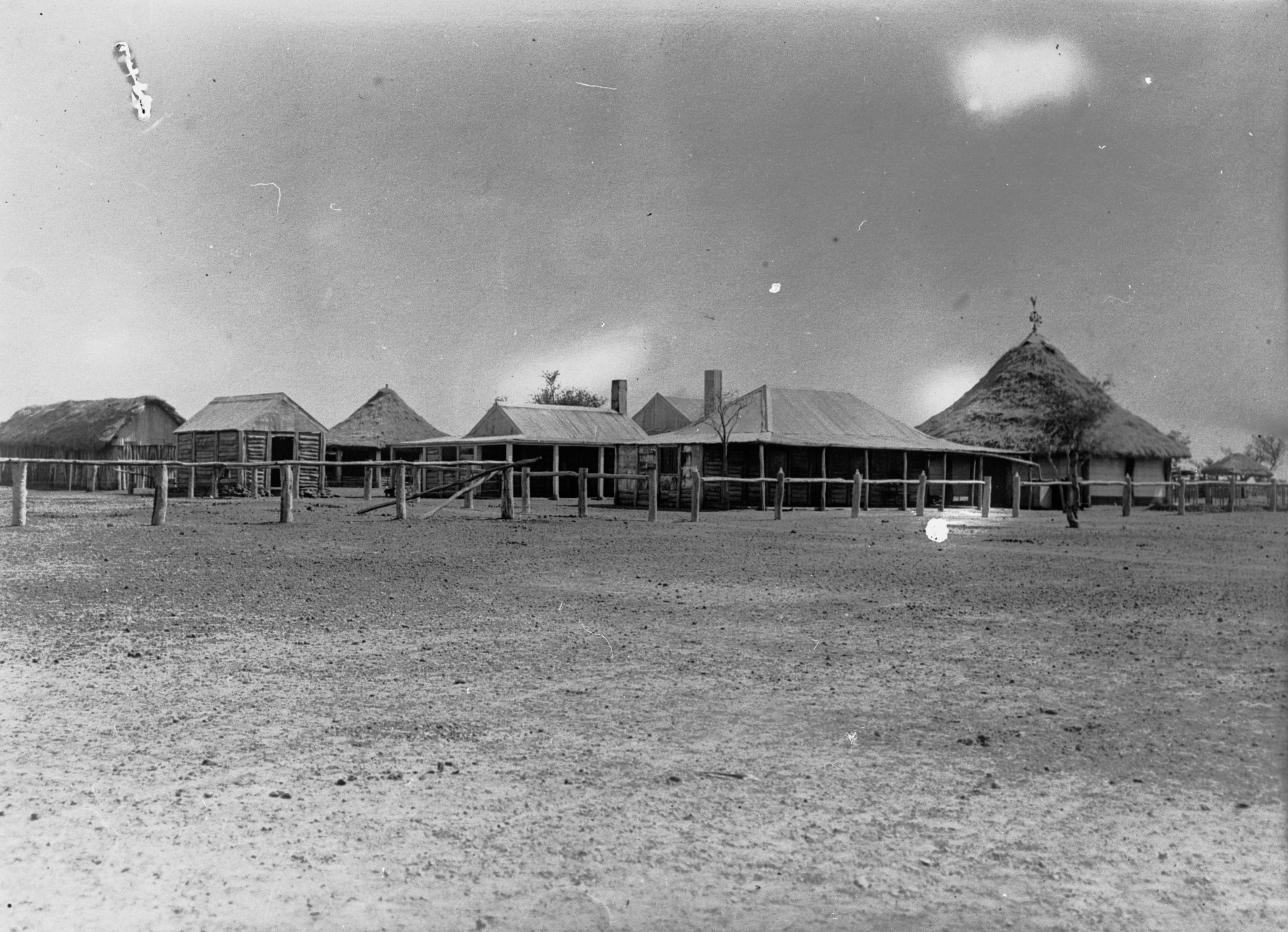
- Newcastle Waters, ca. 1905

- Coordinates: 17°21′58″S 133°24′05″E
- Country: Australia
- State: Northern Territory
- LGA: Barkly Regional Council
- Location: 606 km (377 mi) S of Darwin; 285 km (177 mi) NW of Tennant Creek
- Established: 9 January 1964 (town); 4 April 2007 (locality)

Government
  - Territory electorate: Barkly
  - Federal division: Lingiari

Population
  - Total: 64 (2016 census)
- Time zone: UTC+9:30 (ACST)
- Postcode: 0862
- Mean max temp: 34.5 °C (94.1 °F)
- Mean min temp: 19.1 °C (66.4 °F)
- Annual rainfall: 601.8 mm (23.69 in)
Localities around Newcastle Waters
Pamayu	Pamayu	Pamayu
Pamayu	Newcastle Waters	Pamayu
Pamayu	Pamayu	Pamayu

Newcastle Waters is a town and locality off the Stuart Highway in the Northern Territory. It is classified as a ghost town that contains a number of preserved historic buildings, including Jones's Store and the Junction Hotel.

== Geography ==
771 kilometres (479 mi) north of Alice Springs, Newcastle Waters is located within the federal division of Lingiari, the territory electoral division of Barkly and the local government area of the Barkly Region, inside Newcastle Waters Station, a large cattle station with over 40,000 head of cattle.

The nearest petrol station and accommodation is found 23 kilometres (14 mi) south at the town Elliott.

== History ==
John McDouall Stuart reached the area on 23 May 1861 in an unsuccessful attempt to cross the continent, he again passed through the area in 1862 on another attempt to cross the continent, which he was successful. The town was named after the Duke of Newcastle at the time.

The Overland Telegraph Station was established in 1872.

In 1926, Newcastle Waters was required by the North Australia Act 1926 to be the permanent site of the seat of government for the now-defunct Territory of North Australia. The provisional seat of government for the territory was Darwin, and nothing was done to establish the new capital before the act was repealed by the Northern Territory (Administration) Act 1931.

In 1935, Qantas Empire Air Services was using the Newcastle Waters landing strip as a link in its mail and passenger run, but the runway proved unsatisfactory, and the service was halted in November 1937.

The township was economically dependent on droving and the arrival of road trains meant that by the early 1960s it had been reduced to a virtual ghost town.

== Demographics ==
The 2016 Australian census which was conducted in August 2016 reports that Newcastle Waters had 64 people living within its boundaries.

In the 2021 census, Newcastle Waters had a population of 122 people, 49.2% female and 50.8% male. The median age of the Newcastle Waters population was 25 years, 13 years below the national median of 38.

== Education ==
The Newcastle Waters School draws most of its few students from the Marlinja homeland community which lies on the northern boundary of the town.
