= Jingili people =

Indigenous people of Northern Territory

The Jingili or Jingulu are an indigenous Australian people of the Northern Territory.

== Language ==
Jingulu is classified as belonging to the Mirndi family of non Pama–Nyungan languages. An early word-list was compiled by F. A. Gillen. Following in the wake of pioneering work by Neil Chadwick in the 1970s, Robert Pensalfini wrote out a grammar of Jingulu on the basis of fieldwork with its last known fluent speakers.

== Country ==
Norman Tindale estimated the range of Jingili lands at approximately 5,900 square miles (15,000 km^{2}). The southern frontier was around the Renner Springs area about Mount Grayling, extending northwards to Newcastle Waters and also took in the area of the Ashburton Range. To the east they encompassed Cattle Creek south of Wave Hill and Ucharonidge. Their western extension ran as far as the 25 miles from Lake Woods. (Note: "The Chinaglee tribe occupy a large area of country of which Charlotte Waters (error for Newcastle Waters) is the centre; extending northward 96 miles to Daly Waters; southwards 60 miles to Powell's Creeks; eastwards 100 miles; and westwards 70 miles." (Ravenscroft 1892, p. 121))

== Social organization ==
R. H. Mathews constructed an early scheme to set forth the marriage divisions of the Jingili.

Divisions of the Jingili tribe
Phratry	Section of Parents		Section of Offspring	
Phratry	Husband	Wife	Son	Daughter
A	Jimmitcha; Chunainjah; Chemarainjah; Tampachina	Nungalleeinja; Nalainjah; Naraleeinjah; Nungareeinjah	Taraleeinjah; Tungareeinjah; Chulainjah; Chungaleeinjah	Naraleeinjah; Nungareeinjah; Nalainjah; Nungalleeinja
B	Chungaleeinjah; Chulainjah; Tungareeinjah; Taraleeinjah	Nameeinjah; Nanainjah; Nabajinah; Nemarainjah	Tampachina; Chemarainjah; Chunainjah; Jimmitcha	Nabajinah; Nemarainjah; Nanainjah; Nameeinjah

Some eight years later he reconfigured the data in the following terms:

Divisions of the Jingili tribe
Phratry	Section of Parents		Section of Offspring
Phratry	Wife	Husband	Offspring
Cycle A	Chungalee; Chula; Taralee; Tungaree	Chimitcha; Chuna; Chemara; Champina	Taralee; Tanagree; Chula; Chingaree
Cycle B	Chimicha; Chuna; Champina; Chimara	Chungalee; Chula; Tangaree; Taralee	Champina; Chemara; Chuna; Chimitcha

== History of contact ==
According to oral tradition, the Jingili originally migrated from the Great Western Desert.

== Alternative names ==
- Chingalee, Chingalli
- Djingili, Djingali, Djinggili
- Leechunguloo
- T(h)ingalie
- Tjingale, Tchingalee
- Tjingilli, Tjingali, Tjingalli
- Tjingilu

Source: Tindale 1974, p. 236

== Some words ==
- mowija (pieces of crystallized quartz used, according to Ravenscroft, to kill an enemy by creeping up to him when the latter slept, and placing the stones on his chest)

== Sources ==
- Basedow, Herbert (1907). "Anthropological notes on the Western Coastal tribes of the Northern Territory of South Australia". Transactions of the Royal Society of South Australia. 31. Adelaide: 1–62 – via BHL.
- Eylmann, Erhard (1908). Die Eingeborenen der Kolonie Südaustralien (PDF). Berlin: D.Reimer – via Internet Archive.
- Mathews, R. H. (July–September 1900). "The Wombya Organization of the Australian Aborigines". American Anthropologist. 2 (3). Adelaide: 494–501. doi:10.1525/aa.1900.2.3.02a00050. JSTOR 658964.
- Mathews, R. H. (1907). "Notes on some aboriginal tribes". Proceedings of the Royal Society of New South Wales. 41: 67–87. doi:10.5962/p.359489. S2CID 259716576 – via BHL.
- Mathews, R. H. (30 March 1908a). "The Sociology of the Arranda and Chingalee Tribes (Northern Territory Australia)". Folklore. 19 (1): 99–103. JSTOR 1254720.
- Mathews, R. H. (April–June 1908b). "Sociology of the Chingalee Tribe, Northern Australia". American Anthropologist. 10 (2): 281–285. doi:10.1525/aa.1908.10.2.02a00110. JSTOR 659579.
- Nordlinger, Rachel (1998). A Grammar of Wambaya, Northern Territory (Australia) (PDF). series C, Volume 140. Pacific Linguistics. ISBN 0-85883-481-2.
- Pensalfini, Robert J. (1997). Jingulu grammar, dictionary, and texts. Massachusetts Institute of Technology. hdl:1721.1/10347.
- Pensalfini, Robert J. (2004). "Eulogizing a language: the Ngarnka experience" (pdf). International Journal of the Sociology of Language (164): 141–156.
- Ravenscroft, A. G. B. (1892). "Some habits and customs of the Chingalee tribe, Northern Territory". Transactions of the Royal Society of South Australia. 15: 121–122 – via BHL.
- Spencer, Sir Baldwin; Gillen, Francis J. (1904). Northern Tribes of Central Australia. Macmillan Publishers – via Internet Archive.
- Stationmaster (1895). "On the habits etc. of the aborigines in the district of Powell's Creek, Northern Territory of South Australia". The Journal of the Anthropological Institute of Great Britain and Ireland. 24: 176–180. JSTOR 2842215.
- Tindale, Norman Barnett (1974). "Tjingili (NT)". Aboriginal Tribes of Australia: Their Terrain, Environmental Controls, Distribution, Limits, and Proper Names. Australian National University. ISBN 978-0-708-10741-6. Archived from the original on 1 March 2021.
