= Central Australia =

Region in Australia

- Region
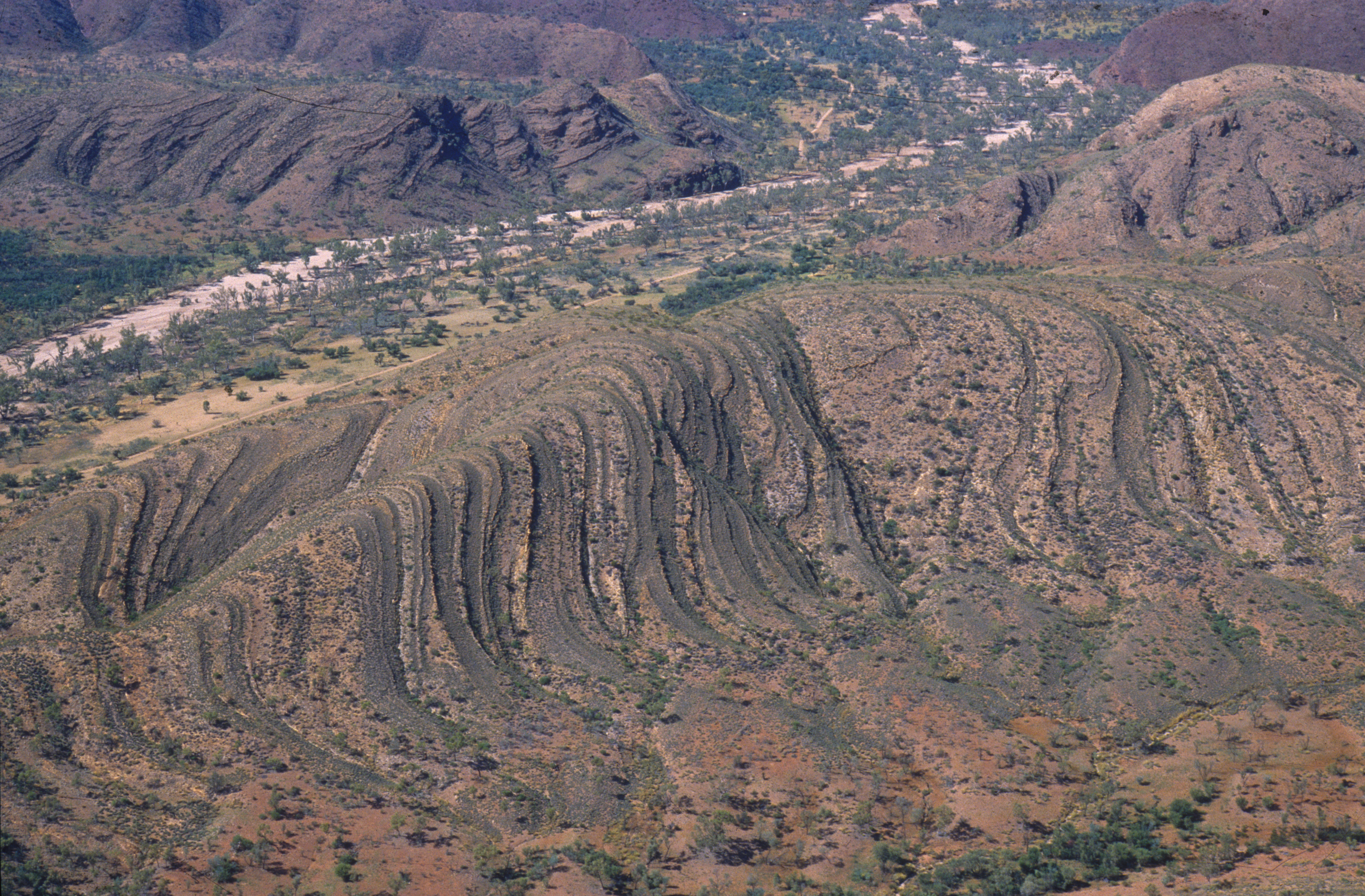
- Aerial view of Central Australian landscape

- Country: Australia
- State: Northern Territory
- LGAs: Alice Springs Town Council; MacDonnell Regional Council; Central Desert Shire

Population
  - Total: 41,000 (2016)

Central Australia, sometimes called the Red Centre, is an inexactly defined region associated with the geographic centre of Australia. In its narrowest sense it describes a region limited to the town of Alice Springs and its immediate surrounds, including the MacDonnell Ranges. Commonly, it refers to an area up to 600 km (370 mi) from Alice Springs in every direction. In its broadest use it can include almost any region in inland Australia that has remained relatively undeveloped, and in this sense is synonymous with the term Outback.

In a modern, more formal sense it can refer to the administrative region used by the Northern Territory government, as of 2022.

Centralia is another term associated with the area.

== Administrative region of the NT ==
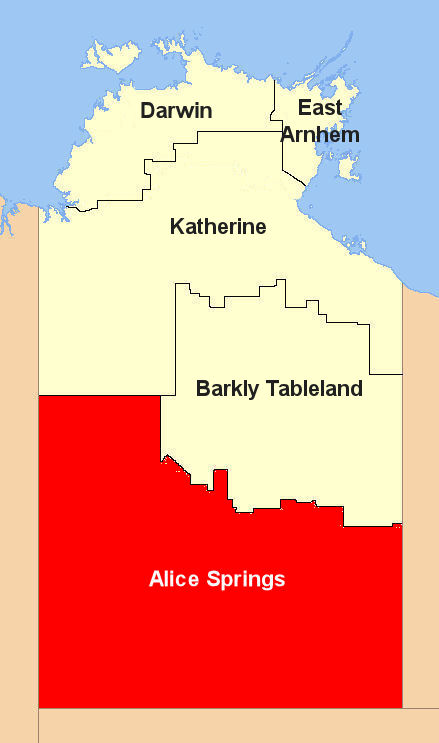
Location of the Central Australia (Alice Springs) Economic Region

=== Economic region ===
There are six regions in the Northern Territory for the purposes of economic planning, as defined by the Northern Territory Government:

- Central Australia
- Darwin, Palmerston and Litchfield
- East Arnhem (also a local government area (LGA))
- Barkly Region (also an LGA)
- Big Rivers Region
- Top End

This region has an estimated total regional population of 41,000, serviced by Alice Springs (population 28,000). The town also services parts of South Australia, Western Australia and Queensland. LGAs make up the region:

- Town of Alice Springs (town)
- Central Desert Region (region)
- MacDonnell Region (region)
- Yulara (unincorporated town)

== Colloquial or general use ==
In more general usage, or when referring to the flora and fauna of Australia, the term "central Australia" may refer to a large area in the interior of the continent, including the Lake Eyre Basin, which stretches across three states and the NT. For many, the term "outback" is almost synonymous with central Australia.

== Climate ==
The region has a desert environment, meaning it is very dry, receiving on average just 150 millimetres (6 in) of rain annually. Most of the rain falls during extreme rainfall events in the summer. Moderate dry winters persist between May and October with hot, long summers from November to April.

== See also ==
- Central Australia (territory), Australian federal territory 1927–1931
- Regions of the Northern Territory
- Centre points of Australia
