= Northern Territory Heritage Register =

Heritage database in Australia

The Northern Territory Heritage Register is a heritage register, being a statutory list of places in the Northern Territory of Australia that are protected by the Northern Territory statute, the Heritage Act 2011. The register is maintained by the Northern Territory Heritage Council.

== Other registers ==
Sites within the Northern Territory are listed on national and international heritage registers such as the following, are not duplicated in the Northern Territory Heritage Register:

- UNESCO World Heritage List
- Australian National Heritage List
- Commonwealth Heritage List
- Australian National Shipwreck Database

== See also ==
- National Trust of Australia (Northern Territory)
- Historical Society of the Northern Territory
