= Darwin central business district =

Darwin City
- Suburb
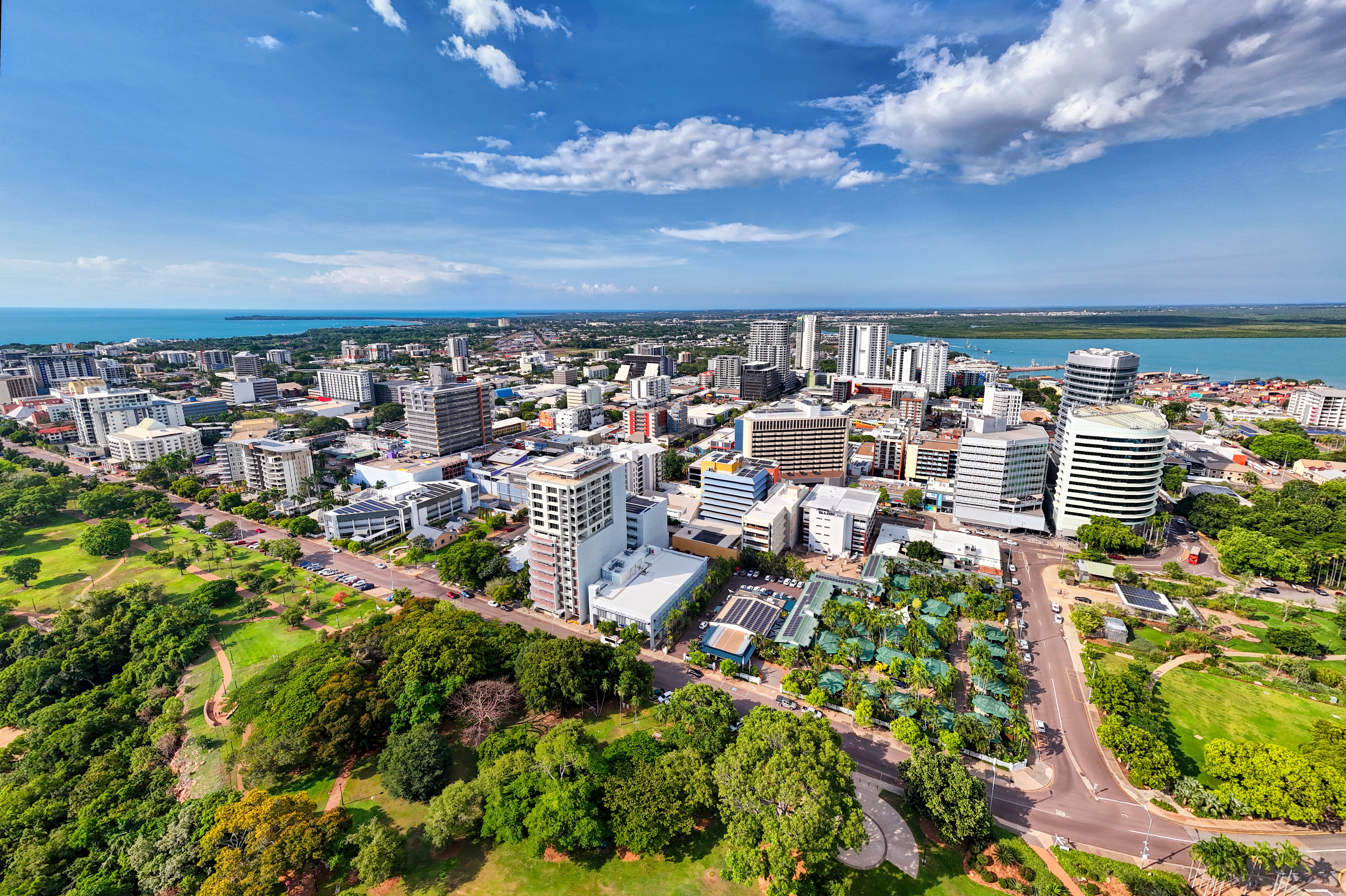
- Darwin CBD

- Flag

- Interactive map of Darwin City
- Coordinates: 12°27′39″S 130°50′40″E
- Country: Australia
- State: Northern Territory
- City: Darwin
- LGAs: City of Darwin; Darwin Waterfront Precinct
- Established: 1869

Government
  - Territory electorate: Port Darwin
  - Federal division: Solomon

Area
  - Total: 1.9 km^{2} (0.73 sq mi)

Population
  - Total: 7,149 (SAL 2021)
- Postcode: 0800
Suburbs around Darwin City
The Gardens	The Gardens; Stuart Park	Charles Darwin
Larrakeyah	Darwin City	Darwin Harbour
Darwin Harbour	Darwin Harbour	Darwin Harbour

Darwin City (also referred to as Darwin city centre or The CBD) is a suburb in metropolitan Darwin which comprises the original settlement, the central business district, parkland and other built-up areas. It is the traditional country and waterways of the Larrakia people. It is original site of occupation and includes many of the city's important institutions and landmarks, such as Parliament, Government House, the Northern Territory Supreme Court, Bicentennial Park and the George Brown Darwin Botanic Gardens. The city centre is located in the local government areas of the City of Darwin and the Darwin Waterfront Precinct.

Although the city centre is one of the most developed areas of Darwin, demographically it is one of the less densely populated, due to its core being commercial.

== History ==
The Larrakia people are the traditional owners of the lands and waters in and surrounding the Darwin local government area. Darwin is known as Garramilla in Gulumirrgin, one of the languages of the Larrakia people, but there are many place names within the area.

The first British person to see Darwin harbour appears to have been Lieutenant John Lort Stokes of HMS Beagle on 9 September 1839. The ship's captain, Commander John Clements Wickham, named the port after Charles Darwin, the British naturalist who had sailed with them both on the earlier second expedition of the Beagle.

In the early 1870s, Darwin felt the effects of a gold rush at Pine Creek after employees of the Australian Overland Telegraph Line found gold while digging holes for telegraph poles.

On 5 February 1869, George Goyder, the Surveyor General of South Australia, established a small settlement of 135 people at Port Darwin. Goyder named the settlement Palmerston, after the British Prime Minister Lord Palmerston. In 1870, the first poles for the Overland Telegraph were erected in Darwin, connecting Australia to the rest of the world. The discovery of gold at Pine Creek in the 1880s further boosted the young territory's development. Upon Commonwealth administration in 1911, Darwin became the city's official name.

== Geography ==
The city centre is bordered by Daly Street to the north and extends east to the Stuart Highway McMinn Street to the east which borders Stuart Park. The border extends and east along Darwin Harbour it extends South the Darwin Waterfront and to the Darwin Convention Centre. It extends West along the Esplande and Bicentennial Park.

== Demographics ==
According to the 2016 census of Population, there were 6,464 people in Darwin City.

- Aboriginal and Torres Strait Islander people made up 3.4% of the population.
- 41.7% of people were born in Australia. The next most common countries of birth were England 4.7%, Philippines 3.3%, Japan 3.3%, India 2.9% and Taiwan 2.8%.
- 53.6% of people spoke only English at home. Other languages spoken at home included Mandarin 5.0%, Japanese 3.3%, Nepali 2.2%, Tagalog 1.8% and Korean 1.6%.
- The most common response for religion was No Religion at 34.9%.
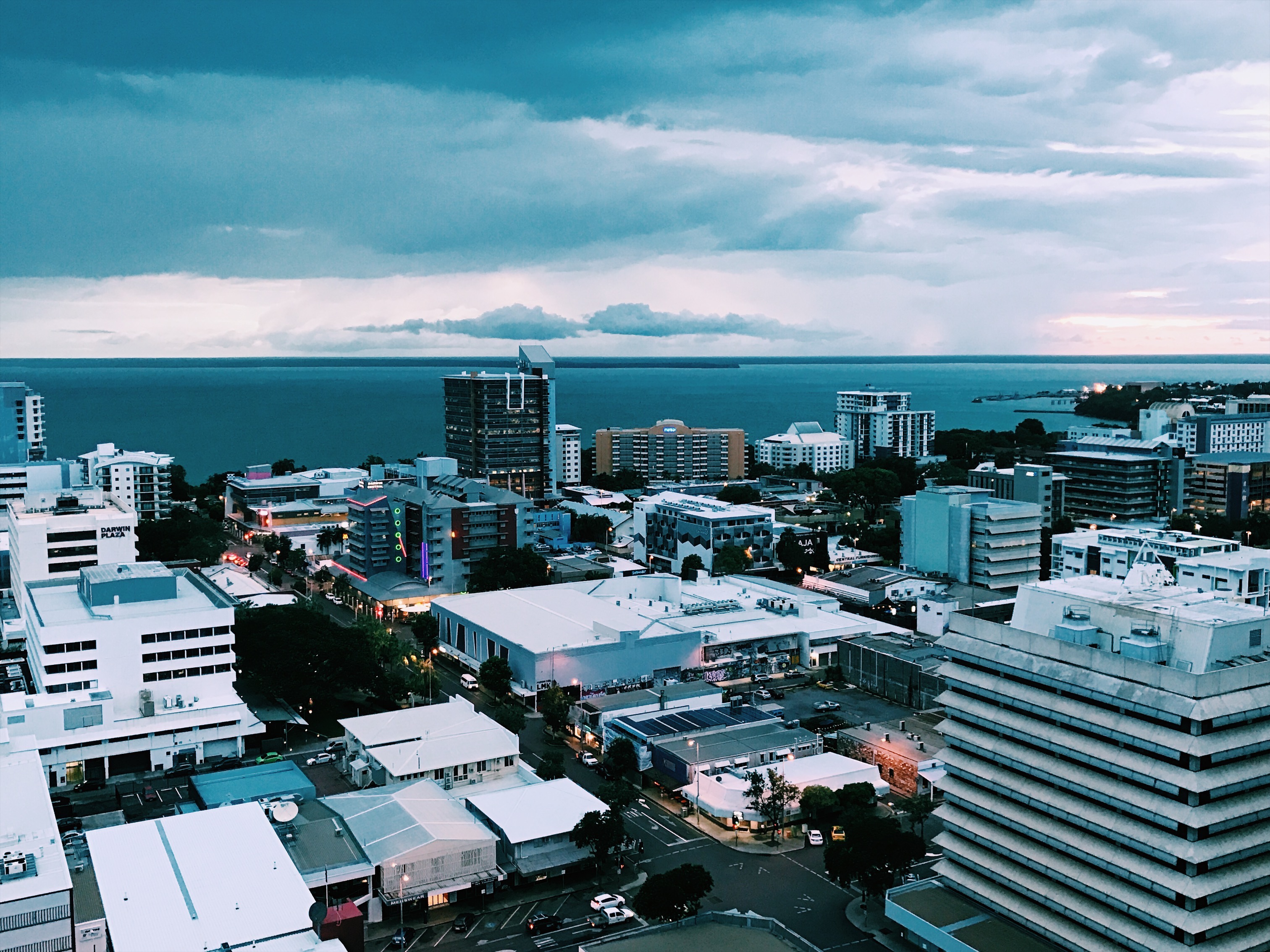
Darwin central business district

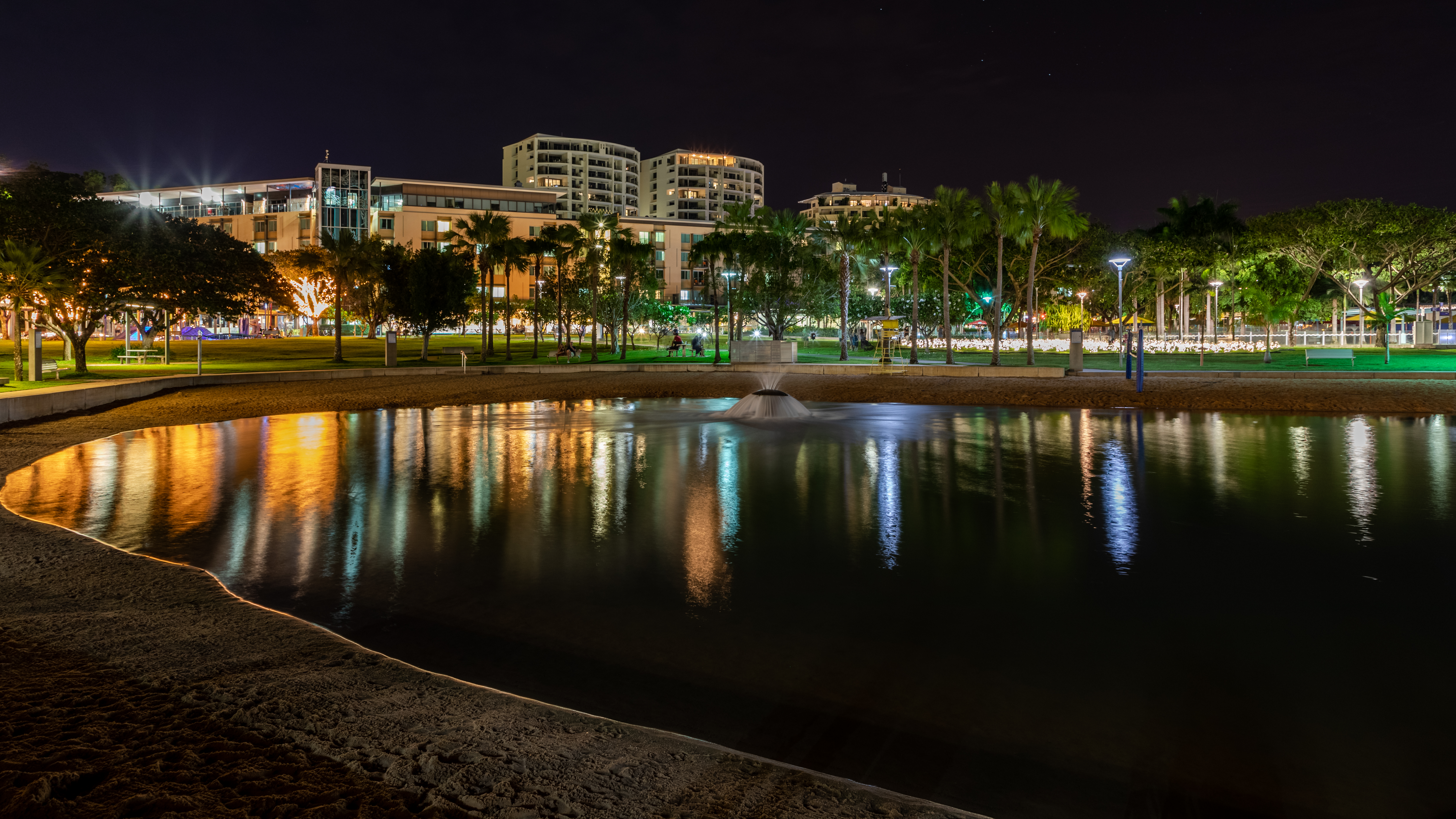
Darwin waterfront and CBD
