= Division of Lingiari =

Australian federal electoral division

Coordinates: 19°S 133°E

Lingiari Australian House of Representatives Division
- Interactive map of boundaries since the 2025 federal election
- Created: 2000
- MP: Marion Scrymgour
- Party: Labor
- Namesake: Vincent Lingiari
- Electors: 74,050 (2022)
- Area: 1,352,371 km^{2} (522,153.4 sq mi)
- Demographic: Rural and remote
- Territory electorates: List: Arafura; Araluen; Arnhem; Barkly; Braitling; Daly; Goyder; Gwoja; Katherine; Mulka; Namatjira; Nelson; Spillett
Electorates around Lingiari:
Solomon	Pacific Ocean	Pacific Ocean
Durack (WA)	Lingiari	Kennedy (Qld)
O'Connor (WA)	Grey (SA)	Maranoa (Qld)

The Division of Lingiari (/lɪŋɡiˈɑːri/) is an Australian electoral division in the Northern Territory which covers the entirety of the territory outside of the Division of Solomon, which covers Darwin and surrounding areas. The division also includes the territories of Christmas Island and the Cocos (Keeling) Islands.

Its MP has been Marion Scrymgour of the Labor Party since 2022. The division has been held continuously by Labor since it was first contested in 2001.

Lingiari includes all of the Northern Territory's remote Indigenous communities, most of whom vote when visited by mobile polling teams during the election campaign. Scrymgour herself is Indigenous and inherited Tiwi identity from her mother.

== Geography ==
Federal electoral division boundaries in Australia are determined at redistributions by a redistribution committee appointed by the Australian Electoral Commission. Redistributions occur for the boundaries of divisions in a particular state or territory, and they occur every seven years, or sooner if a state or territory's representation entitlement changes or when divisions of a state or territory are malapportioned.

Since the 2024 redistribution, the division covers almost the entirety of the Northern Territory except the City of Darwin and City of Palmerston local government areas.

== History ==
The division was named after prominent Aboriginal rights activist Vincent Lingiari AM (1908–1988), who was a member of the Gurindji nation. Other divisions named after Aboriginal Australians are Bennelong in New South Wales, Blair and Bonner in Queensland, and Cooper and Nicholls in Victoria.

The division was one of the two established when the former Division of Northern Territory was redistributed on 21 December 2000 ahead of the 2001 federal election. It covers almost the entire Territory—except for the area around Darwin, which is covered by the Division of Solomon—an area of 1,347,849 square kilometres (520,407 sq mi). It is the second largest electorate in terms of area in Australia, the largest being the Division of Durack in Western Australia. The division also includes the Christmas and Cocos (Keeling) Islands. From its formation until the 2022 Australian federal election, it had been held by Warren Snowdon of the Australian Labor Party, who transferred there after the Division of Northern Territory was abolished.

At the time of the 2004 election, there were 58,205 people enrolled to vote in Lingiari, making it one of the least populous divisions in Australia. Lingiari has the largest Indigenous population in Australia; as of the 2013 election, 42.7 percent of the population was Indigenous.

== Members ==
Image	Member	Party	Term	Notes
	Warren Snowdon (1950–)	Labor	10 November 2001 – 11 April 2022	Previously held the Division of Northern Territory. Served as a minister under Rudd and Gillard. Retired
	Marion Scrymgour (1960–)	Labor	21 May 2022 – present	Previously held the Northern Territory Legislative Assembly seat of Arafura. Incumbent

== Election results ==
2025 Australian federal election: Lingiari
Party	Candidate	Votes	%	±%
Labor	Marion Scrymgour	20,372	44.64	+7.39
Country Liberal	Lisa Siebert	14,143	30.99	−3.48
Greens	Blair McFarland	4,646	10.18	−0.84
One Nation	Sakellarios Bairamis	4,132	9.06	+3.77
Indigenous-Aboriginal	Chris Tomlins	1,317	2.89	+2.89
Citizens	Peter Flynn	1,022	2.24	+1.18
Total formal votes		45,632	95.49	+2.95
Informal votes		2,157	4.51	−2.95
Turnout		47,789	62.21	+1.79
Two-candidate-preferred result
Labor	Marion Scrymgour	26,524	58.13	+6.53
Country Liberal	Lisa Siebert	19,108	41.87	−6.53
Labor hold		Swing	+6.53	
