= Tuxworth =

Tuxworth is an English surname. Notable people with the surname include:

- Hilda Tuxworth (1908–1994), Australian nurse, community worker and historian
- Ian Tuxworth (1942–2020), Australian politician, son of Hilda

== See also ==
- Tuxworth ministry, ministry of Ian Tuxworth for the Australian Northern Territory
- Tuxworth Fullwood House, a historic building in Tennant Creek in the Northern Territory of Australia, named after Hilda Tuxworth and Bill Fullwood
