= Bill Fullwood =

Australian artist (1910–2005)

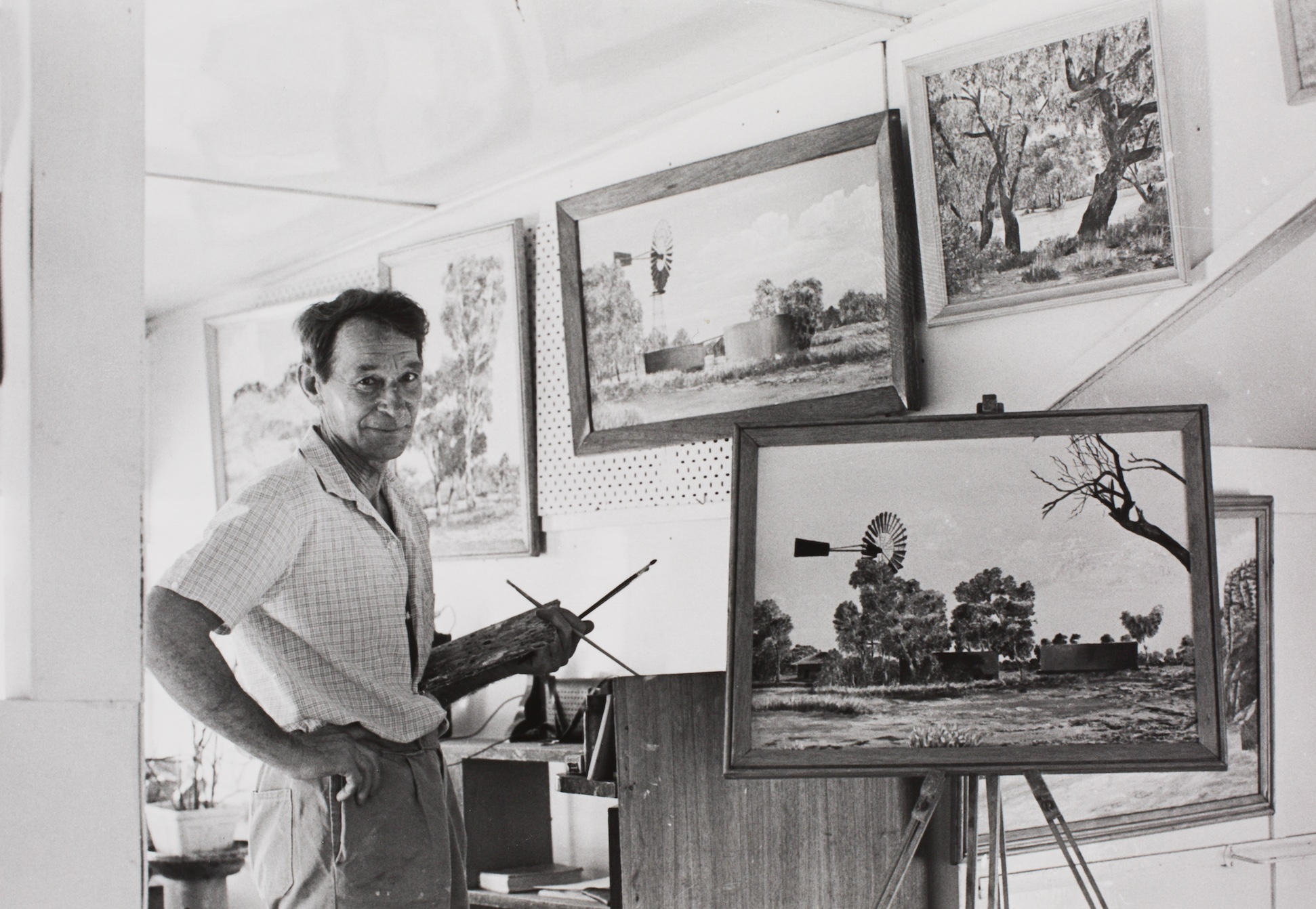
- Born: William Henry Charles Fullwood; 15 March 1910; London, England
- Died: 17 February 2005 (aged 94)
- Burial place: Tennant Creek Cemetery, Tennant Creek, Australia
- Occupation: artist
- Known for: depictions of the Barkly Region
- Spouses: first wife (m. 1940) Marjorie Cowan (m. 1950)

William Henry Charles Fullwood (15 March 1910 – 17 February 2005), better known as Bill Fullwood, was an Australian painter. He is considered one of the most significant artists from the Barkly Region of the Northern Territory of Australia, best known for his depictions of scenes of the Barkly Region. He was a long-term resident and mining pioneer of Tennant Creek. The historic Tuxworth Fullwood House is named after him.

== Early life ==
Fullwood was born in London in 1910. He began working in the mining industry from the age of 18. He moved to Perth as a two-year-old. At the age of 14, he began traveling around Western Australia carrying only a swag and his shoes, that he wore only when he arrived at a station to prevent unnecessary wear and tear. Fullwood worked at Meekatharra Mine and later at Kartabaya Station. On one journey he walked from Geraldton to Carnarvon. He also met his first wife in 1940.

Fullwood enlisted in the Royal Australian Air Force in Perth in 1939. He trained as an armorer in the 100th Squadron at Bairnsdale. He later specialised in aircraft hydraulics and was stationed in different parts of New Guinea.

After the war, Fullwood worked in mining in Western Australia, Queensland and South Australia. Fullwood moved to Tennant Creek in 1947, hitching a ride from Alice Springs to take up a job constructing shafts on the Mount Samuel mine. He described the town as "pretty rough" and "dusty" at the time. He then went on to develop and manage the Whippet mining lease and then worked in a variety of roles at Nobles Nob mine. He also took up gold mining leases of his own. By 1954, he became an agent servicing the Warrumunga Goldfield.

Fullwood met his second wife Marjorie Cowan in Tennant Creek. They married in April 1950 in Kalgoorlie in Western Australia, returning to Tennant Creek shortly after. They built their own home from scrap metal sourced from Darwin after World War II.

== Art career ==
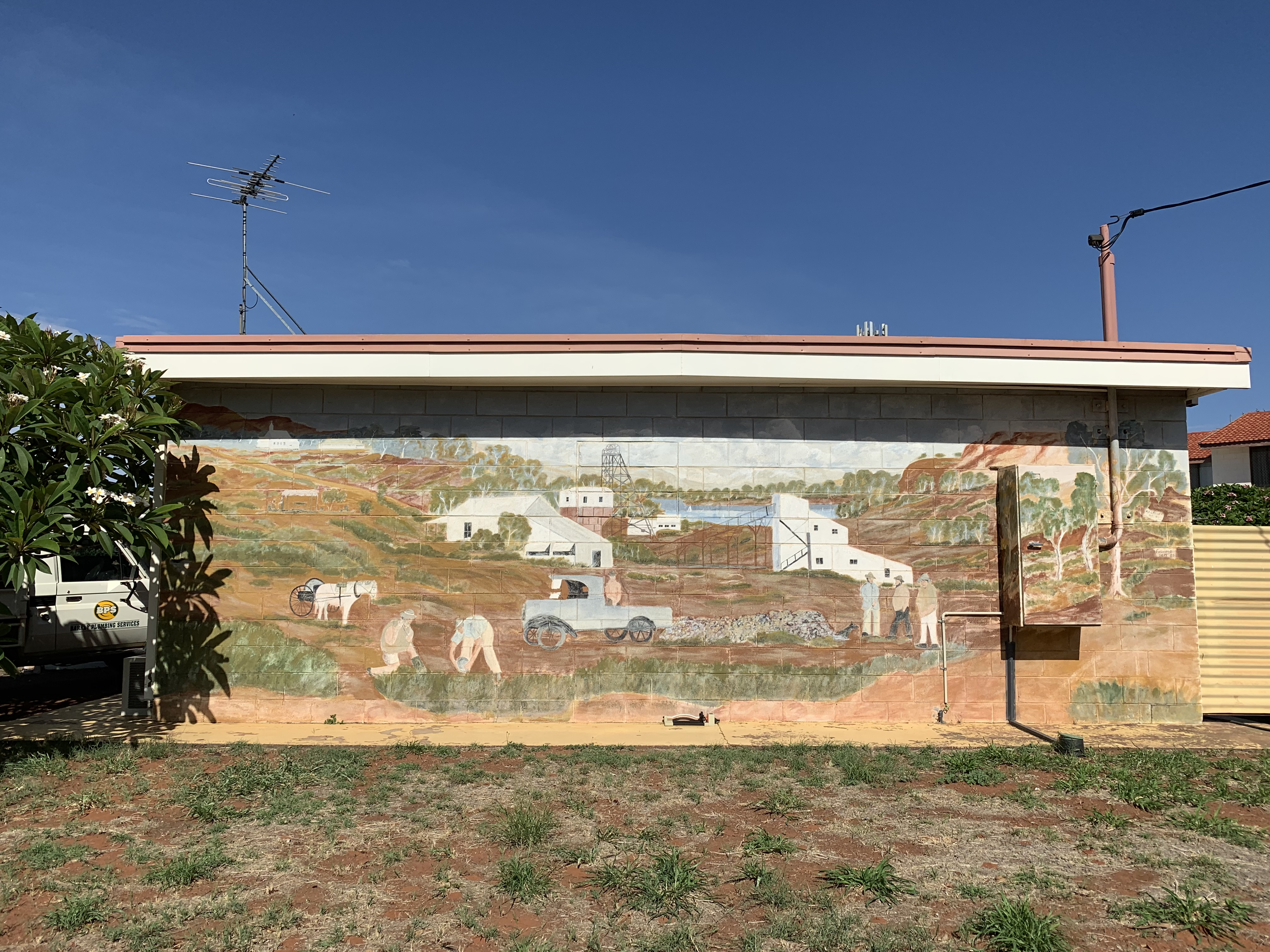
Bill Fullwood's Mural on Leichhardt Street

Fullwood took up watercolour painting while recovering in Darwin after an accident, eventually switching to oil paints. The majority of his works are held by the Country Women's Association's Tennant Creek Branch as part of the Tennant Creek Art Collection. He was also a musician, who played mandolin and piano accordion.

== Later life ==
In later life, Fullwood was committed to preserving Tennant Creek's history. He was critical to the development of the mining museum, housed in the Tuxworth Fullwood House, a former World War II hospital now after him and Hilda Tuxworth.

Fullwood died on 17 February 2005 from pneumonia. He is buried in the Tennant Creek Cemetery with his wife Marjorie.
