= Tuxworth Fullwood House =

Historic building in Tennant Creek, Northern Territory

Coordinates: 19°38′48″S 134°11′16″E

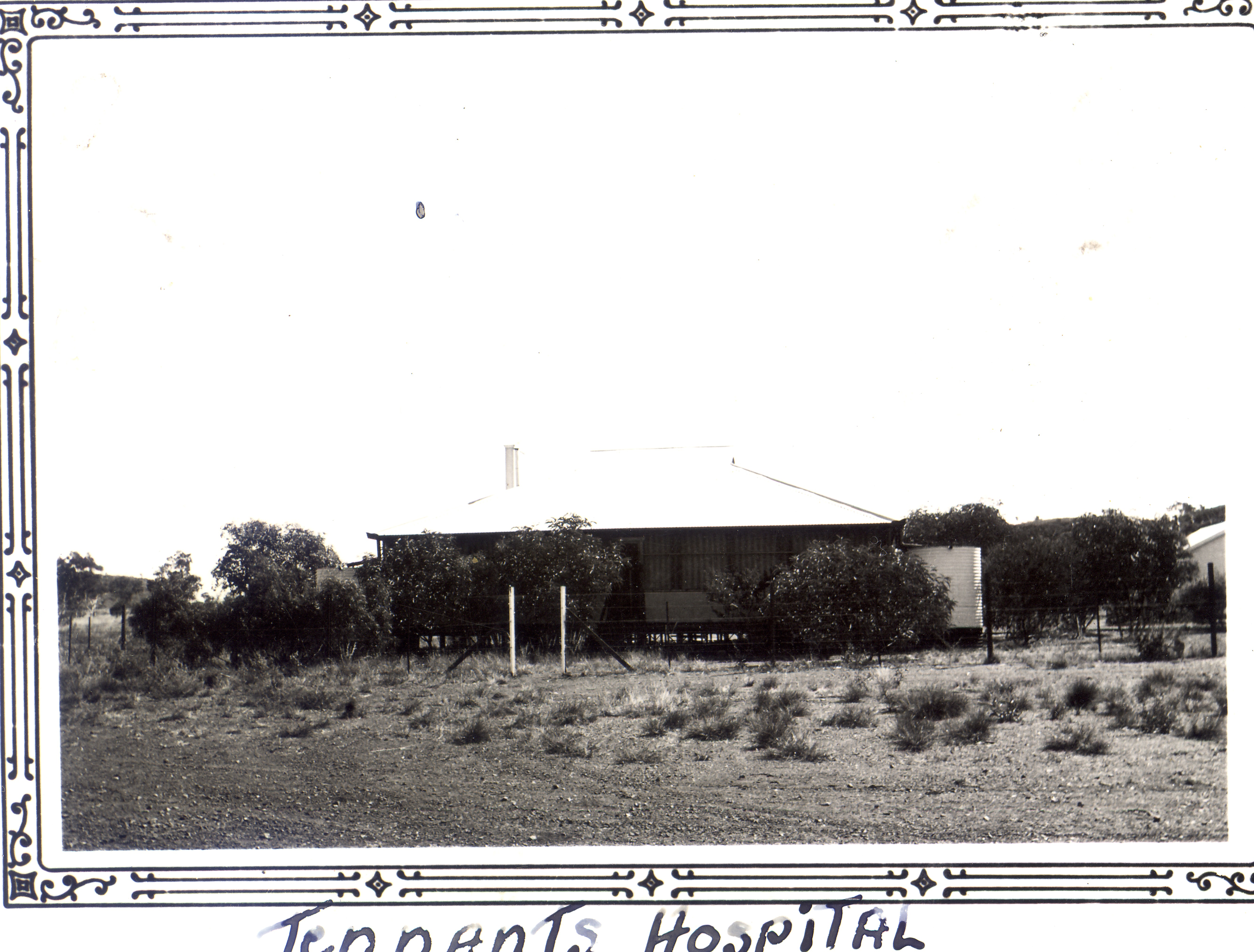
Tuxworth Fullwood House, photograph taken between 1942 - 1948

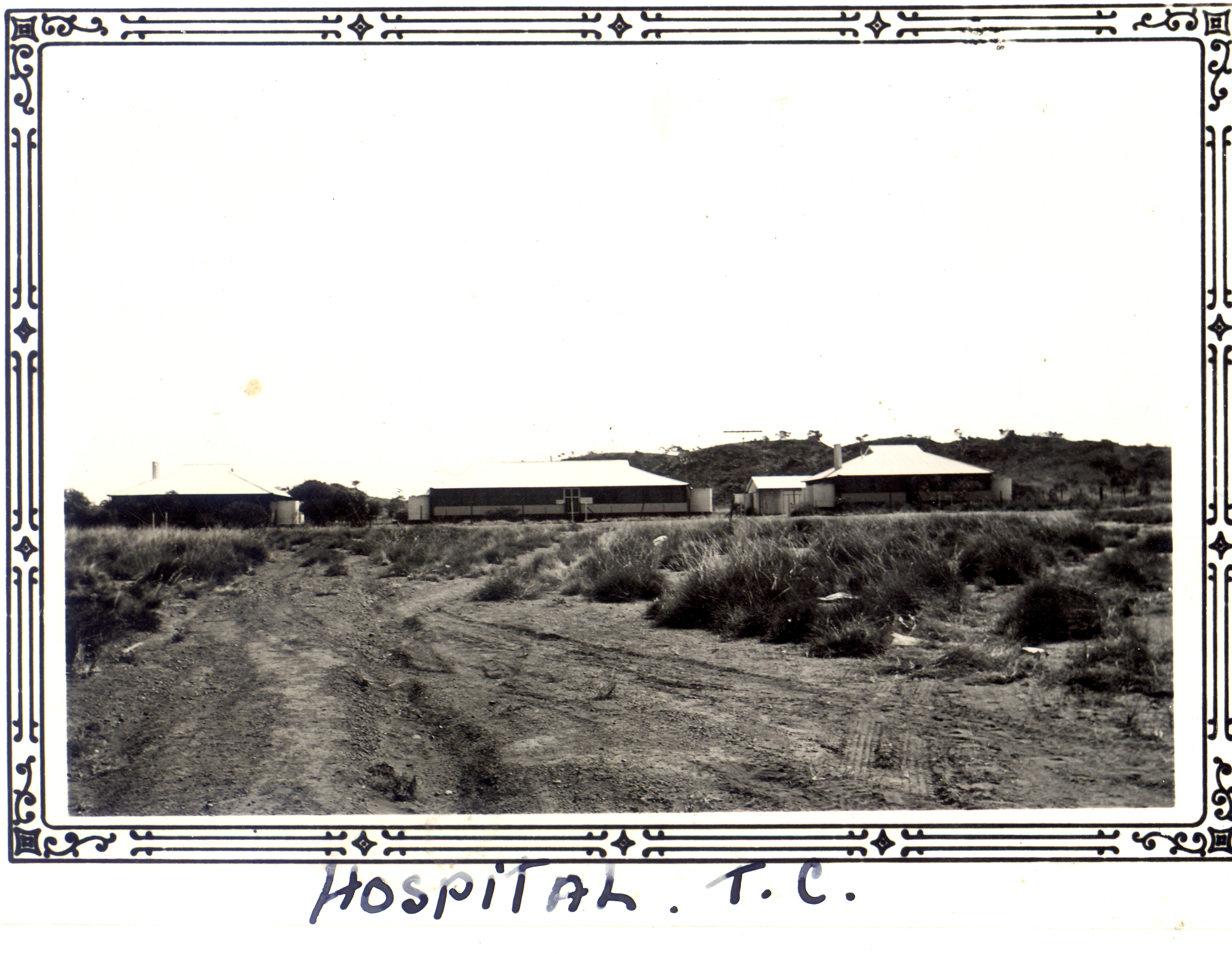
The broader hospital complex

Tuxworth Fullwood House is a historic building in Tennant Creek in the Northern Territory of Australia. It was known as the No. 55 Australian Camp Hospital during World War II becoming the Tennant Creek Hospital Outpatients Department after the war. It was the first brick building constructed in the town and is one of the last remaining military structures in the Barkly region.

== Construction ==
Tuxworth Fullwood House was a hospital built in 1942 during World War II. It was built for the Commonwealth Department of Health only to be handed to the Australian Army as the 55 Army Camp Hospital. It was designed by well-known Northern Territory architect Beni Burnett and was his first design for arid areas.

It became the Tennant Creek Hospital Outpatients Department after its decommissioning as a war hospital in June 1945. The Army was criticised for removing key staff and most of the medical equipment upon returning the hospital. It serviced the town until 1978. It then became a museum housing archival materials relating to Tennant Creek including a 1930s police cell and steam traction engine. Its name was eventually changed to Tuxworth Fullwood House, named after Hilda Tuxworth and Bill Fullwood.

The building was listed on the Northern Territory Heritage Register on 25 October 1995 and on the now-defunct Register of the National Estate after 1980. It is managed by the National Trust of Australia (Northern Territory). It was restored in 2009.
