= Tanami =

Tanami may refer to:

== Places ==
- Tanami (IBRA region), a biogeographic region in Australia
- Tanami, Northern Territory, a locality in Australia
- Tanami Desert, a desert in Australia
- Tanami Downs, a pastoral lease in Australia
- Tanami Road, also known as the Tanami Track, a road that traverses the Tanami Desert in Australia
- Tanami Station, a railway station in Japan

== People ==
- Kōji Tanami, a Japanese banker

== Other uses ==
- Tanami East, Northern Territory, a locality in Australia
- North Tanami Band, a reggae/ska band
- Tanami toadlet, a species of frog
