= Supplejack Downs =

Pastoral lease in the Northern Territory

Coordinates: 19.27967°S 129.94246°E

Location in Northern Territory

Supplejack Downs, also known as Suplejack Downs, is a pastoral lease operating as a cattle station in the Northern Territory of Australia.

The property is situated about 760 kilometres (472 mi) south of Darwin and about 127 kilometres (79 mi) south west of Lajamanu in the locality of Tanami in the central west of the Northern Territory. Supplejack shares a boundary with the Purtu Aboriginal Land Trust to the west and is otherwise surrounded by vacant crown land.

Suplejack occupies an area of 3,823 square kilometres (1,476 sq mi) along the margins of the Tanami Desert and is accessible by the Tanami Track. The country is composed of rolling hills, tablelands open plains and flood-out country, with herbage such as Mitchell grass, Flinders grass and oat grass, along with trees and shrubs including suplejack, mulga, whitewood and spinifex. The property supports a herd of approximately 8,000 cattle.

The property was established in 1961 by Bob and Lil Savage when they were granted a grazing licence for the area. Construction of a homestead commenced in 1965 as did fencing and the drilling of bores. By 1966 two bores had been sunk and 10 kilometres (6 mi) of fencing had been erected. The Savages had previously worked on the nearby stations Hooker Creek and Yuendumu, before deciding on settling at Suplejack.

In 1976 the property occupied an area of 4,338 square kilometres (1,675 sq mi) and was subject to a claim of being a traditional Dreaming area of four Aboriginal men, all members of the Warlpiri people. Another family, the Cooks, were also living at Suplejack in 1976.

A pastoral lease was granted to the Savages by the government in 1978, which they still held in 2011.

Tragedy struck the Cook family during the cattle muster of 2008 when a helicopter crash left Rob Cook a quadriplegic as a result of spinal injuries he received in the crash. The pastoral community rallied around the Cook family and raised A$75,000 to support them, while Rob received treatment in an Adelaide hospital. Rob later crossed the Tanami Desert in his modified four wheel drive wheelchair to raise money for his Nuffield Scholarship, and was awarded a courage medal at the national Pride of Australia awards in 2011. He received a Nuffield Scholarship in 2011.

== See also ==
- List of ranches and stations
