= Lake Mary Ann =

Body of water in Northern Territory, Australia

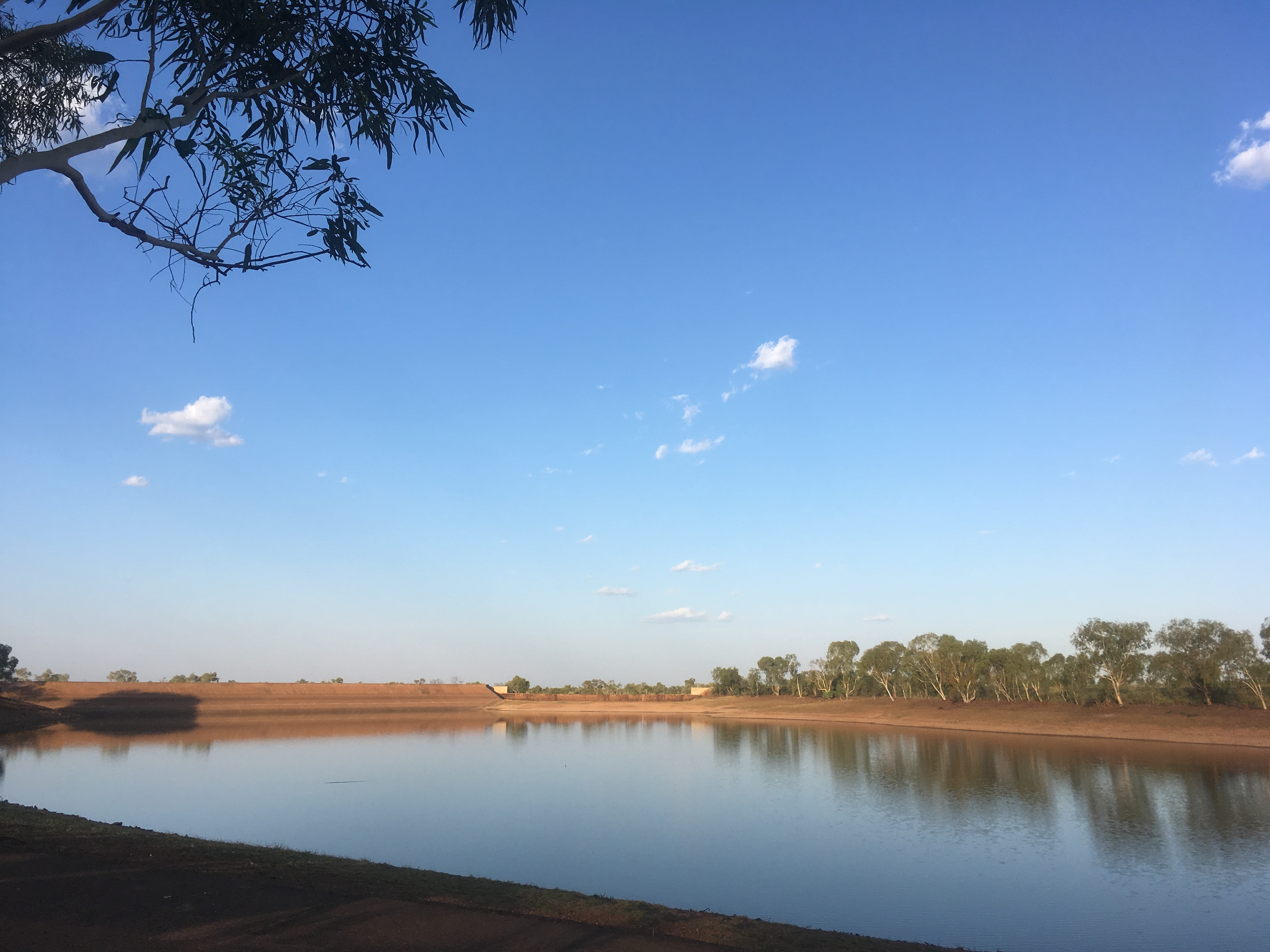
- The dam wall and reservoir in 2018

- Location of the lake and dam in the Northern Territory
- Interactive map of Lake Mary Ann
- Country: Australia
- Location: Warumungu, near Tennant Creek, Northern Territory
- Coordinates: 19°36′27″S 134°12′47″E
- Purpose: Recreation
- Status: Operational
- Construction began: 1979
- Opening date: 24 April 1981
- Built by: Macmahon Constructions
- Owners: Tennant Creek Town Council; Warramungu Land Trust; Central Land Council

Dam and spillways
- Type of dam: Embankment dam
- Impounds: Mary Ann Creek
- Height (foundation): 15 m (49 ft)
- Length: 160 m (520 ft)
- Dam volume: 28×10^{3} m^{3} (990×10^{3} cu ft)
- Spillway type: Uncontrolled
- Spillway capacity: 220 m^{3}/s (7,800 cu ft/s)

Reservoir
- Creates: Lake Mary Ann
- Total capacity: 450 ML (360 acre⋅ft)
- Catchment area: 9 km^{2} (3.5 sq mi)
- Surface area: 27 ha (67 acres)
- Maximum water depth: 7 m (23 ft)
- Normal elevation: 365 m (1,198 ft) AHD

Lake Mary Ann (Warumungu: Tingkkarli) and previously known as Mary Ann Dam up until 7 December 2005, is an earth- and rockfill embankment dam across the Mary Ann Creek, located approximately 5 kilometres (3.1 mi) north of Tennant Creek, in the Northern Territory of Australia. Situated just off the Stuart Highway and completed in 1980, the resultant reservoir was built exclusively for recreational purposes. Some water sports, such as swimming or canoeing, can be conducted surrounded by landscaped grassy areas on one side and natural bushland on the other.

== History ==
The Waramungu people have lived in the area of Tingkkarli for thousands of years. After colonisation, it was pegged as mining lease GML441E by Nugget Wilson and Bill Howes and Harold Williams. Wilson and Howes named the mine 'Mary Ann' after their respective daughters Mary Jean and Wendy Ann. The nearby watercourse then became known as Mary Ann Creek or Mary Ann Billabong.

Originally the site was investigated with a view to increase the water supply for Tennant Creek and Peko Mine in the late 1940s, and later again in the mid-1950s. In 1977, local residents proposed that a recreational dam could be constructed close to Tennant Creek. The Northern Territory Government supported the proposal and construction commenced during 1979 and 1980.

The dam wall was completed in April 1980, was filled for the first time in January 1981, and was officially opened on 24 April 1981 by the Hon Ian Tuxworth, named as the Mary Ann Dam. In December 2005, the reservoir was renamed as Lake Mary Ann.

The earth and rock-filled dam wall is 11 metres (36 ft) high and 143 metres (469 ft) long and contains 17,000 cubic metres (600,000 cu ft) of rockfill. The impounded reservoir, when full, holds a maximum of 450 megalitres (360 acre⋅ft) and covers 27 hectares (67 acres), drawn from a catchment area of 9 square kilometres (3.5 sq mi). The uncontrolled spillway has capacity of 220 cubic metres per second (7,800 cu ft/s).

In 2014, a Federal Court determined seven native title claims in the area of Lake Mary Ann covering 37,000 square kilometres (14,000 sq mi).

== See also ==
- List of dams and reservoirs in Australia
