= Tennant Creek Airport =

- IATA: TCA; ICAO: YTNK

Summary
- Airport type: Public
- Operator: Tennant Creek Airport Pty Ltd
- Location: Tennant Creek, Northern Territory
- Elevation AMSL: 1,236 ft (377 m)
- Coordinates: 19°38′04″S 134°11′00″E

Map
- Location in the Northern Territory

Runways
Direction	Length		Surface
Direction	m	ft	Surface
07/25	1,959	6,427	Asphalt
11/29	1,054	3,458	Asphalt
- Sources: Australian AIP and aerodrome chart

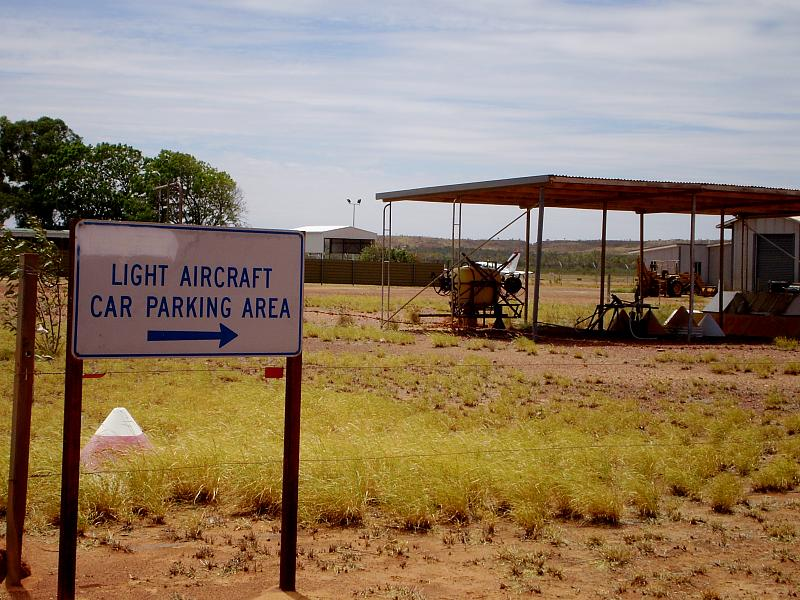
Tennant Creek airport

Tennant Creek Airport (IATA: TCA, ICAO: YTNK) is a small regional airport located near Tennant Creek, Northern Territory, Australia.

Located one kilometre from the remote outback township of Tennant Creek, the airport caters to mining companies and small, predominantly Aboriginal, communities in the surrounding area, providing an important link for the local population with Alice Springs, Katherine, Darwin and other regional centres.

The current operator of the airport is Tennant Creek Airport Pty Ltd. Airport operations include scheduled passenger service, mail flights to outlying communities, charters and aeromedical flights.

== History ==
=== World War II ===
During World War II, the airfield was utilised as a staging airfield between South Australia and Darwin, Northern Territory, by the Royal Australian Air Force.

==== Units that utilised Tennant Creek Airfield ====
- No. 34 Squadron RAAF

=== Post-war ===
The terminal facilities at Tennant Creek Airport were constructed during the 1960s.

On 1 April 1989, the Federal Airports Corporation took control of the airport, and on 10 June 1998, passed control and management to the Airport Development Group (ADG). ADG hold a 50-year lease over Tennant Creek Airport with free option for a further 49 years.

In June 2013, Chartair began services twice weekly to Alice Springs after receiving a subsidy from the Federal Government to operate the route under the Remote Air Services Subsidy Scheme.

Airnorth announced in 2015 that they would serve Tennant Creek and Katherine three times per week as intermediate stops on the "centre run" between Darwin and Alice Springs, using Embraer EMB 120 Brasilia aircraft.

== Airlines and destinations ==
=== Passenger ===
Airlines	Destinations
Airnorth	Alice Springs, Darwin, Katherine

=== Cargo ===
Airlines	Destinations
Chartair	Alice Springs, Borroloola

A number of scheduled freight only routes operate to and from Tennant Creek, carrying mail, medical supplies and general freight to remote communities under a Federal government subsidy through the Remote Air Services Subsidy scheme. As of 2026, there were three such routes; one operating directly between Tennant Creek and Alice Springs, one from Tennant Creek to Borroloola making intermediate stops at various remote communities and stations and a third returning to Tennant Creek from Borroloola making different intermediate stops.

== Accidents and incidents ==
- On 24 September 1966, a Lockheed Hudson crashed one mile west of the airport. The aircraft had been conducting aerial survey work. All six on board were killed, including an 11 year old local boy who was on board for a joy flight. The accident occurred less than 48 hours after the crash of Ansett-ANA Flight 149.

== See also ==
- List of airports in the Northern Territory
