= Borroloola Airport =

- IATA: BOX; ICAO: YBRL

Summary
- Airport type: Public
- Owner: Northern Territory Government
- Operator: Department of Infrastructure, Planning and Environment
- Serves: Borroloola
- Location: Borroloola, Northern Territory, Australia
- Elevation AMSL: 55 ft (17 m)
- Coordinates: 16°04′05″S 136°18′01″E

Map
- Location in the Northern Territory

Runways
Direction	Length		Surface
Direction	m	ft	Surface
02/20	1,113	3,652	Asphalt
- Sources: AIP

Borroloola Airport (IATA: BOX, ICAO: YBRL) is an airport located approximately 1.5 km (0.93 mi) south of Borroloola in the Northern Territory, Australia.

== Facilities and operations ==
The airport has a single sealed runway measuring 1,113 m × 18 m (3,652 ft × 59 ft). Portable runway lighting is available for emergency operation at night. Due to its remote location, air traffic is infrequent and there is no control tower. Pilots co-ordinate takeoffs and landings using a Common Traffic Advisory Frequency. There is a Non-Directional Beacon radio navigation aid located close to the airport. Fuel is available by arrangement with the ground handling agent. The terminal facilities consist of a basic waiting shelter and a public toilet.

There are currently no airlines or scheduled passenger flights serving Borroloola however several charter companies offer flights to the airport, including Katherine Aviation who have a pilot and Cessna aircraft permanently based at the airport to operate on demand charter flights to Katherine and other communities and scenic flights to the nearby Sir Edward Pellew Islands and surrounding attractions. There is also a twice weekly mail plane from Katherine and the airstrip is available 24 hours a day for medical evacuation flights.

== Airlines and destinations ==
=== Cargo ===
Airlines	Destinations
Chartair	Katherine, Tennant Creek

As of 2026, three scheduled freight only routes operate to or stop at Borroloola, carrying mail, medical supplies and general freight to remote communities under a Federal government subsidy through the Remote Air Services Subsidy scheme. All are scheduled weekly; one operating as a loop from Katherine with an intermediate stop in Borroloola, one from Tennant Creek to Borroloola making intermediate stops at various remote communities and stations and a third returning to Tennant Creek from Borroloola making different intermediate stops.

== Accidents and incidents ==
- On 31 November 1987, a Cessna 172 was stolen from Borroloola airport after the engine was started using the frame from a pair of sunglasses. During takeoff, the tail of the aircraft struck the runway and an attempt to correct this by reducing power led to the aircraft's nosewheel striking the ground. It then ran off the runway and came to rest upside down. The person at the controls had never undertaken formal flight training or held a pilots licence.

== See also ==
- List of airports in the Northern Territory
- McArthur River Mine Airport
