= Burnett House (Darwin) =

Coordinates: 12°27′03″S 130°49′47″E

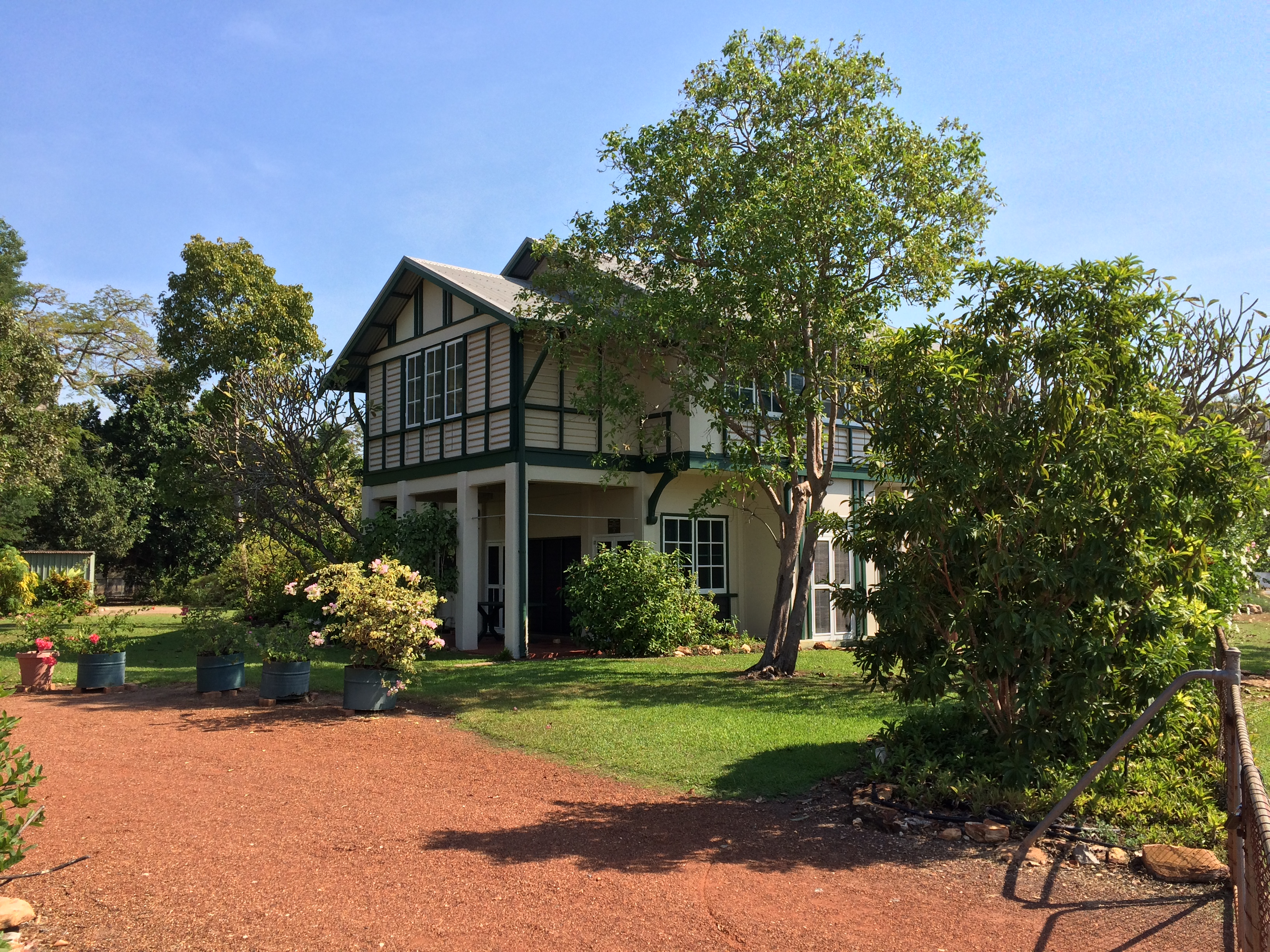
Burnett House at Myilly Point in Darwin

Burnett House is a historic building that forms part of the Myilly Point Precinct in Darwin, Northern Territory. It is the only remaining two storey house designed by architect Beni Burnett. It is managed by the National Trust of Australia (Northern Territory).

== History ==
Burnett House was built in 1938. It was designed by Beni Burnett, Architect Grade One in the Works and Services Branch of the Department of the Interior. It was one of several houses for senior public servants and military personnel.

Burnett House survived the Bombing of Darwin during World War II. Two bullet holes are visible in the front fence and fragments of a bomb were also found in the garden years later

The dwelling was heritage listed as part of the Myilly Point Precinct in 1994.

In 1999, the National Trust of Australia (Northern Territory) announced its intention to buy Burnett House and the adjacent property known as Mines House. It was reported that the Commonwealth Government had offered both properties to the National Trust for $400,000. Territory Senator Grant Tambling said he would prefer they were given to the Trust. In 2002 the Commonwealth Government, which still owned the property, called for expressions of interest for the "future ownership and management" of Burnett House and others in the same area. Senator Nigel Scullion claimed the houses had already been "gifted" to the people of the Northern Territory. The Commonwealth Government denied this.

== Design ==
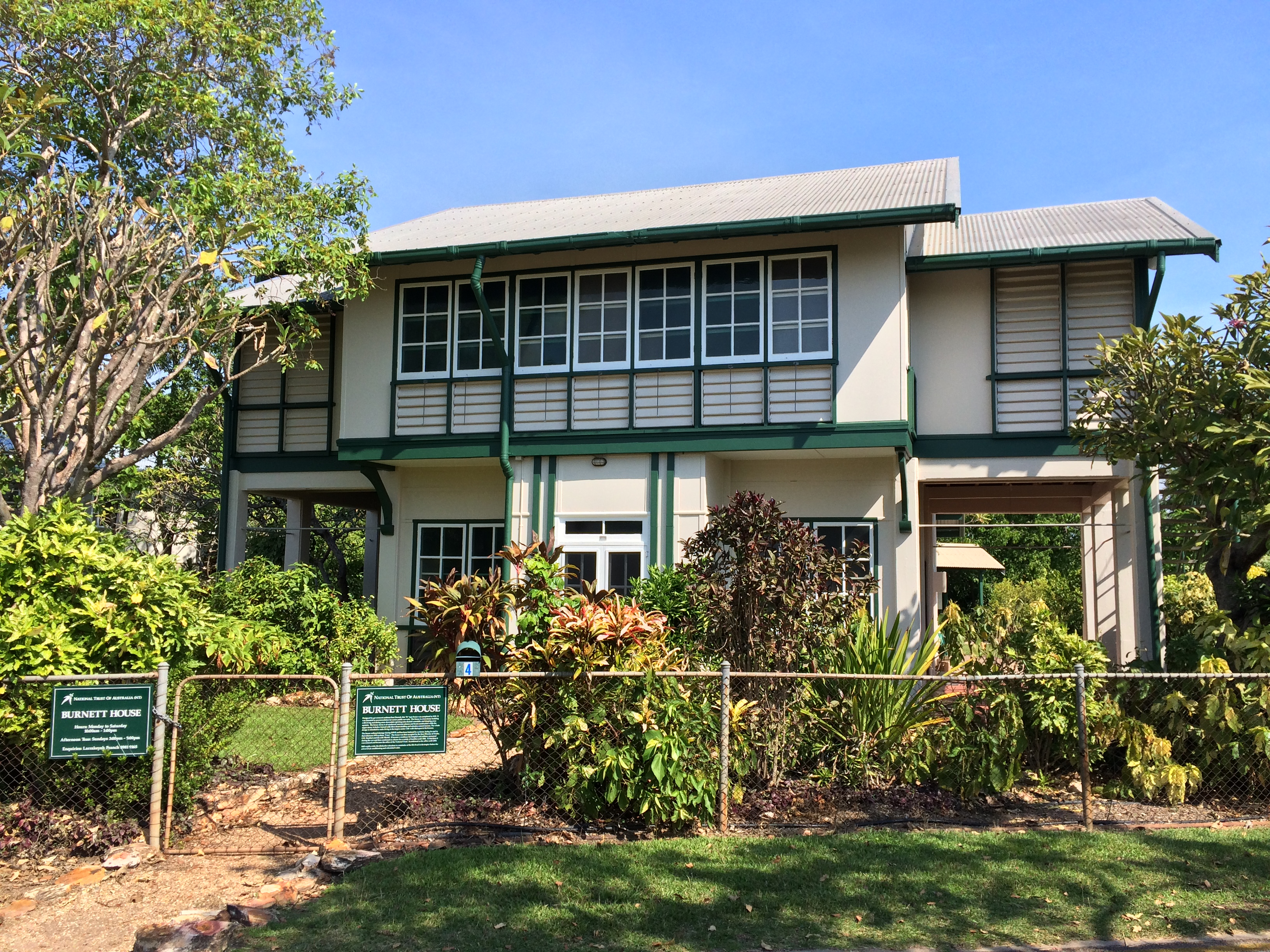
Burnett House at Myilly Point

Burnett House is a "K Type" house, designed specifically for tropical conditions. Considered radical for its time, it is two storeys, with living areas downstairs and bedrooms upstairs. It is built from lightweight materials such as asbestos cement sheeting, corrugated roof cladding and a unique form of louvres with patterning by casement windows. The roof is steeply pitched with an asbestos ridge vent at the top, allowing air to circulate from open eaves through the ceiling space and out the ridge. It also incorporates asbestos louvres, glass casement windows and screened walls to allow for maximum air flow throughout. It also features three-quarter height partitions between rooms.
