= Rabbit Flat, Northern Territory =

Coordinates: 20°11′00″S 130°01′00″E

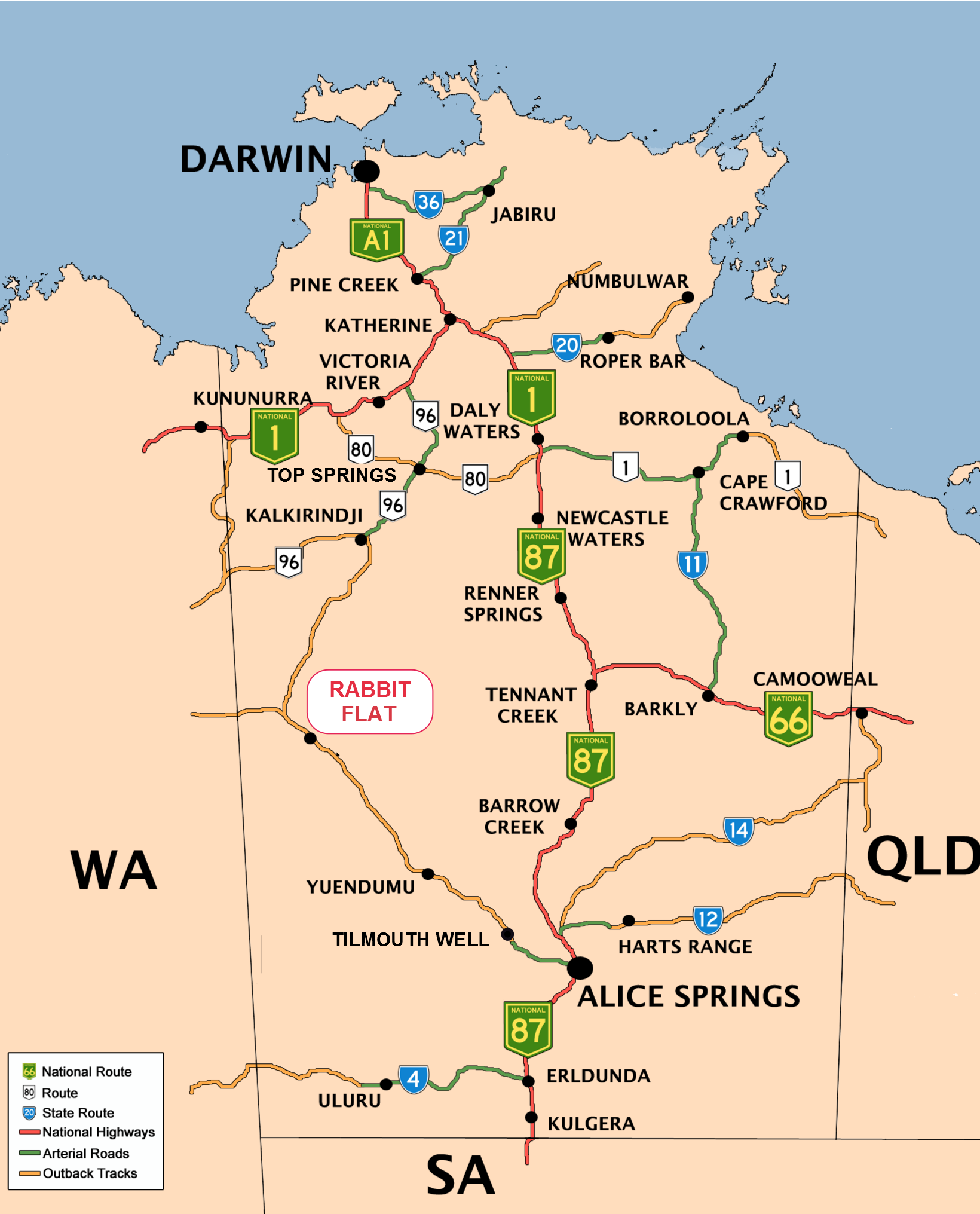
Map of Northern Territory roads showing location of Rabbit Flat

Rabbit Flat was a roadhouse in the Northern Territory of Australia, in the locality of Tanami, about 160 kilometres (100 mi) from the Western Australia border. It lies between the Tanami Mine (45 km NW) and The Granites Mine (53 km SE) on the Tanami Road.

== Roadhouse ==
The former Rabbit Flat Roadhouse claimed to be the most isolated one in Australia, with no other roadhouse within 100 kilometres (62 mi). It was established on 14 June 1969, by Bruce Farrands and his wife Jackie, a French national. An arrangement had been agreed between the Farrands and Ansett-Pioneer Coaches to provide overnight tent accommodation for a tourist route between Alice Springs and Darwin via Wave Hill, now known as Kalkarindji.

The location was chosen because of the availability of water at the Rabbit Flat well, on the stock route from Alice Springs to Halls Creek. By December 1969, Rabbit Flat had been selected by the Bureau of Meteorology as a weather reporting station. Over time, the roadhouse became a stop for fuel, food and souvenirs. An orchard of fruit trees grew nearby, and jams and preservatives were produced on site. An airstrip was established 800m to the south.

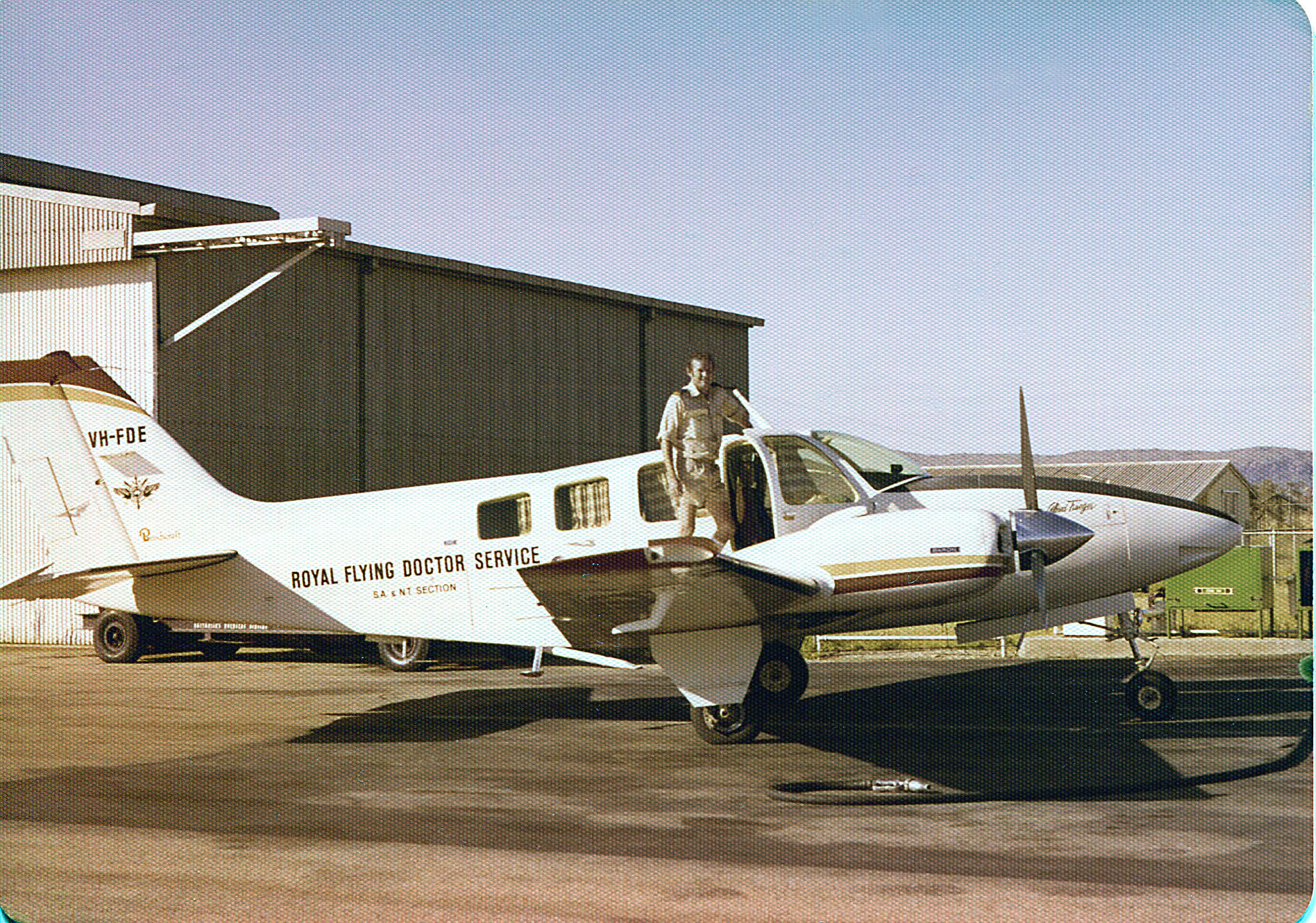
RFDS aircraft that flew mother and twins to Alice Springs

On the morning of 6 August 1975, media interest was aroused when twin boys were born to the Farrands. Neither the surprised parents nor medical staff in Alice Springs were aware that more than one baby was expected. Mother Jackie and the babies were flown to Alice Springs hospital by the Royal Flying Doctor Service for observation, because the boys were six weeks premature. On arrival in Alice Springs, the pilot of the RFDS aircraft was reported to have quipped that "the population of Rabbit Flat doubled last night". A documentary film about Rabbit Flat was produced by the Australian Broadcasting Corporation for its television series A Big Country.

== Closure of the Roadhouse ==
After more than 41 years of service, the Farrands decided to close the roadhouse to all services, except weather reporting and the sale of souvenirs and preserved goods. The change occurred on 31 December 2010.

== Climate ==
Rabbit Flat has a hot-semi-arid climate (Köppen: BSh) with a very hot, highly erratic wet season between December and March and a warm to hot dry season from April to November, with cooler nights and lower humidity. The highest recorded temperature is 47.9 °C (118.2 °F) on 25 December 2019, whilst the lowest is −3.5 °C (25.7 °F) on 5 July 1984. The roadhouse manager maintained the weather station at Rabbit Flat, the closest other station being at Balgo, a small Aboriginal community 211 kilometres (131 mi) to the west.

Climate data for Rabbit Flat (20º11'S, 130º01'E, 340 m AMSL) (1996-2024 normals, extremes 1969-2024)
Month	Jan	Feb	Mar	Apr	May	Jun	Jul	Aug	Sep	Oct	Nov	Dec	Year
Record high °C (°F)	46.7 (116.1)	45.9 (114.6)	44.9 (112.8)	41.3 (106.3)	38.8 (101.8)	35.5 (95.9)	35.4 (95.7)	38.6 (101.5)	41.8 (107.2)	44.6 (112.3)	46.1 (115.0)	47.9 (118.2)	47.9 (118.2)
Mean daily maximum °C (°F)	38.6 (101.5)	37.6 (99.7)	36.6 (97.9)	34.4 (93.9)	29.3 (84.7)	26.0 (78.8)	26.5 (79.7)	29.5 (85.1)	34.5 (94.1)	37.4 (99.3)	38.7 (101.7)	39.0 (102.2)	34.0 (93.2)
Mean daily minimum °C (°F)	24.3 (75.7)	23.5 (74.3)	21.7 (71.1)	16.9 (62.4)	11.6 (52.9)	8.0 (46.4)	6.7 (44.1)	8.4 (47.1)	14.1 (57.4)	18.4 (65.1)	21.9 (71.4)	23.8 (74.8)	16.6 (61.9)
Record low °C (°F)	14.2 (57.6)	13.4 (56.1)	11.5 (52.7)	6.4 (43.5)	−1.0 (30.2)	−1.9 (28.6)	−3.5 (25.7)	−1.8 (28.8)	1.5 (34.7)	4.0 (39.2)	10.1 (50.2)	13.4 (56.1)	−3.5 (25.7)
Average precipitation mm (inches)	134.1 (5.28)	82.7 (3.26)	80.7 (3.18)	19.9 (0.78)	11.3 (0.44)	6.4 (0.25)	5.8 (0.23)	2.5 (0.10)	4.6 (0.18)	21.0 (0.83)	43.5 (1.71)	81.0 (3.19)	501.1 (19.73)
Average precipitation days (≥ 0.2 mm)	11.6	8.6	7.4	2.0	2.1	1.2	0.9	0.3	0.9	4.1	6.9	10.1	56.1
Average afternoon relative humidity (%)	31	35	28	20	23	23	20	14	14	15	19	28	23
Average dew point °C (°F)	13.9 (57.0)	14.7 (58.5)	11.3 (52.3)	5.6 (42.1)	3.0 (37.4)	0.8 (33.4)	−0.9 (30.4)	−2.9 (26.8)	0.0 (32.0)	1.9 (35.4)	6.7 (44.1)	11.6 (52.9)	5.5 (41.9)
Mean monthly sunshine hours	294.5	251.4	285.2	294.0	275.9	288.0	306.9	325.5	309.0	310.0	294.0	275.9	3,510.3
Percentage possible sunshine	72	70	76	84	80	88	90	92	86	80	75	67	80
Source: Bureau of Meteorology (1996-2024 normals, extremes 1969-2024)

== Map reference ==
- Westprint Heritage Maps.(2002) Tanami Track: Alice Springs, The Granites, Rabbit Flat, Billiluna, Halls Creek / compiled by John Deckert; cartographic design and production by Flat Earth Mapping. 3rd ed. Scale 1:1,000,000 (E 127°20' -- E 134°00'/S 17°25' --S 24°00') Nhill, Vic. : Westprint Heritage Maps. ISBN 978-1-875608-11-9 also known as Westprint Heritage Maps for modern explorers.
