= Hilda Tuxworth =

Australian historian and nurse (1908–1994)

Hilda Elise (Biddy) Tuxworth MBE (25 June 1908 – 19 January 1994) was a nurse, community worker and historian who spent much of her life living in the Northern Territory of Australia. She was the mother of politician Ian Tuxworth.

== Early life ==
Tuxworth was born in Woy Woy in New South Wales and was the seventh of nine children born to Herbert Henry and Elizabeth Ellen Phegan. She attended school at Bondi Domestic Science School and, after completing her education, worked as a governess and began training as a nurse at Wollongong Hospital.

On 18 May 1935, she married Lindsay John Tuxworth, an engineer, at the Church of Our Lady of Dolours in Chatswood. In the early years of their marriage they moved regularly for Lindsay's work, including in New Guinea, and later, after Japan entered World War II they returned to Wollongong where Lindsay served in the Citizen Military Forces: it was here that their son Ian was born on 18 June 1942 and they had two other sons.

== Life in the Northern Territory ==
After the war, in 1951, Tuxworth and her husband moved to Tennant Creek where Lindsay worked as an engineer, first with the Eldorado mine and then for the Peko mine. While there Tuxworth worked as a nurse for the Peko mine and also for the Red Cross and St John's Ambulance. She also taught ballet and painted local wildflowers in both oils and watercolours.

In 1965, started researching local history and begun working as a historian. One of her primary interests was oral history and she collected interviews from many residents and so called 'old timers' of Tennant Creek which are now held by Library & Archives NT. Alongside her friend Marjorie Fullwood she also collected and copied significant amount of documents and photographs relating to the region which were then deposited with the Fryer Library and within the Tuxworth-Fullwod archives.

During her career as a historian, Tuxworth published a series of books and small publications, including Tennant Creek: yesterday and today (1966), and was a contributor to the Northern Territory Dictionary of Biography.

In 1974, Tuxworth was instrumental to the formation of the Tennant Creek Branch of the National Trust and served for many years on its board. As a part of this, helped lobby for the prevention of the demolition of the former outpatients department of the Tennant Creek Hospital and this is now known as Tuxworth Fullwood House which holds their archives as well as being the headquarters of the National Trust. Tuxworth was also involved in other local community organisations including the Country Women's Association, the St Johns Ambulance Association and the Tennant Creek District Association and, for this community work, was appointed an MBE in January 1969.

Tuxworth's husband Lindsay died in 1981 and she remained in Tennant Creek until 1993 when she moved to Perth to be closer to her sons.

She died on 19 January 1994 in Perth and her ashes where transferred to Tennant Creek.
