= Beni Burnett =

Beni Carr Glyn Burnett (1889–1955) was the Commonwealth principal architect for the Northern Territory of Australia. He designed many well-known heritage buildings in both Darwin and Alice Springs. He is known for designing innovative, climate-appropriate buildings.

== Early life ==
Burnett was born in Pao T'eo, Shansi Province of China, on 16 June 1889. The son of missionaries (his father from the Isle of Wight, England, his mother from Cardigan, Wales), he spent part of his youth at the China Inland Mission School in Chefoo. At 15 years of age, he began work with the architectural firm Smedly and Denham in Shanghai. He went on to work in Singapore, Japan and China. Some of this buildings are thought to be influenced by the colonial architecture of Malaysia and Singapore.

He married Florence Mary Draper-Bentley in Shanghai on 8 December 1914. After separating in 1934, Burnett moved to Australia. His wife and two children moved to Scotland. He was known to say that he was "the happiest of married men as his dear wife lived 12,000 miles away".

== Work in the Northern Territory ==
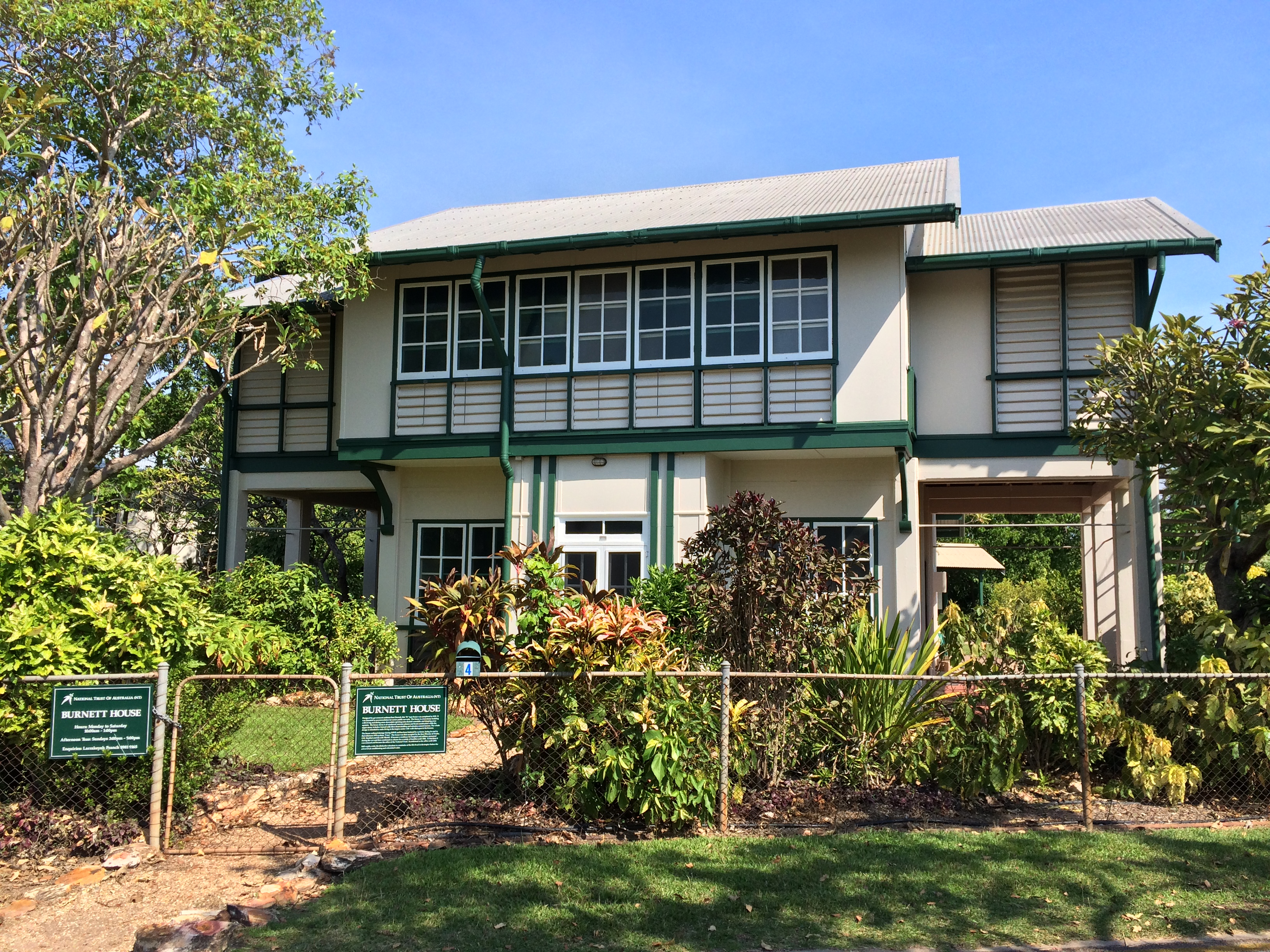
Burnett House at Myilly Point

In July 1937 Burnett was appointed Architect Grade One in the Works and Services Branch of the Department of the Interior. He commenced work in the newly created Darwin office. His role was to design a series of tropical houses for senior public servants and military personnel. He produced several different designs which had similar features. They predominantly were elevated, with steeply pitched roofs. The bedrooms were grouped around or adjacent to the central living area. Asbestos louvres and screened walls allowed for airflow throughout the house. Of his remaining houses, the heritage-listed Burnett House in Myilly Point in Darwin is his best known.

In February 1942, Darwin was bombed by the Japanese and Burnett was evacuated to Alice Springs. He designed a number of houses for the Central Australian climate, including the Riverside Hotel (now the Todd Tavern). Many of his residential buildings now make up the Hartley Street heritage precinct in Alice Springs. These include number 75, 80, 81, 82, 84 and 86 Hartley Street and 81 Bath Street.

Burnett often performed in the role of Magistrate and Coroner in Alice Springs. He was known to have had an unconventional approach to the law. On one instance when he was overseeing a case of two youths arrested for fighting, it became apparent that neither party knew who had begun the fight, nor who had won it. Burnett ordered the fight recommence under the supervision of a local policeman and adjourned the case. They were then fined five Shillings and told that it would be cheaper to confine their fighting to the youth club from now on.

== Later life ==
Burnett spent the later part of his life sketching the clientele in public bars throughout Alice Springs. He was known for his signature dress, which included knee-high woollen socks with tartan tabs from Scotland. He did not take kindly to comments about his socks. Burnett became a Licentiate of the Royal Institute of British Architects in 1925 and a Fellow in 1955.

Burnett died of a stroke in Alice Springs Hospital on 8 March 1955. He is buried at the Alice Springs Cemetery.
