= Nobles Nob mine =

Gold mine in the Northern Territory, Australia

Nobles Nob
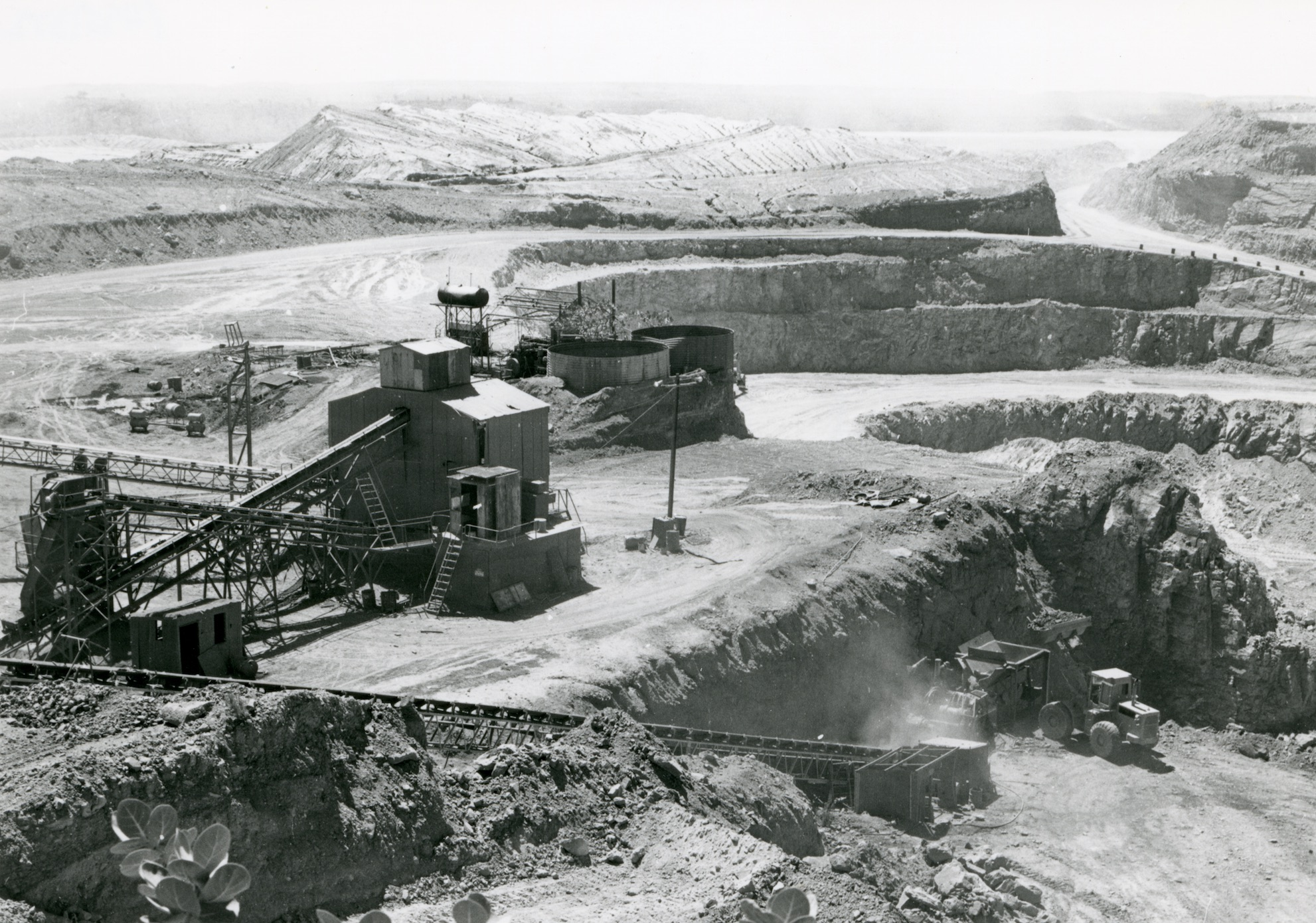
- Nobles Nob in 1980

- Location in the Northern Territory
- Location: Warumunga, Northern Territory, Australia; 19°42′46.6″S 134°17′31.9″E
- Products: gold
- Closed: 1985
- Company: Excalibur Mining

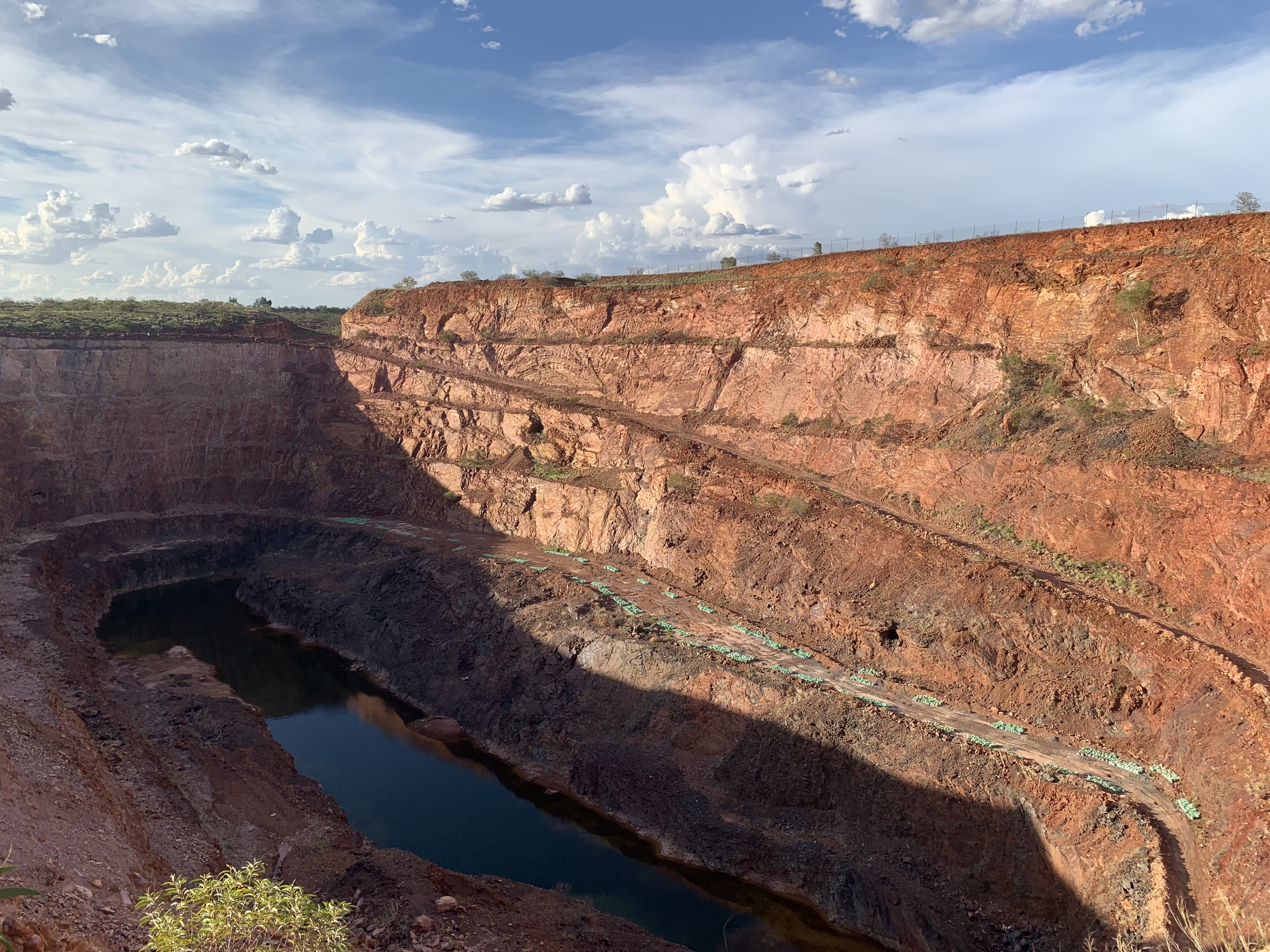
The abandoned Nobles Nob Mine pit

Nobles Nob mine is a gold mine in the Northern Territory of Australia located in the locality of Warumunga about 13 kilometres (8.1 mi) south-east of the town of Tennant Creek. It was once the richest gold mine for its size in the world.

== Establishment ==
The Nobles Nob deposit was first prospected by blind cattleman Bill Weaber and his wife Kathleen, who came to Tennant Creek from Wyndham in Western Australia, arriving on 16 November 1933. He began prospecting the following day with prospector Jack Noble, who was blind in one eye. Noble is best known for discovering The Pinnacles in Western Australia and Wheal Doria mines in Tennant Creek. Kathleen Weaber, later named the mine after him. Weaber was granted four leases on the site on 2 March 1934, pegged out by Noble. (Note: An urban myth associated with the establishment of Nobles Nob mine is that Noble would select a specimen and describe it to the blind Weaber, who would then handle it for some time, "seeing" with his fingers. The two men would then discuss it again and decided whether to process it or not. This is an urban legend. Bill undertook the management of the venture only.)

The mine was bought by Australian Development NL in 1937. The Weabers left Tennant Creek in 1940 following a series of family tragedies. They sold the lease, unaware of the mine's potential.

A battery was operational at the mine by 1947.

== Production ==
During the mine's life, Nobles Nob produced over a million ounces (32 tons) of gold. By 1949, the mine's ore was valued at £1,003,860. Nobles Nob produced assays which regularly exceeded 100 oz (3.2 kg) of gold per metric ton. One particularly rich area within the ore body produced over 300 oz per ton.

A worker, Mr. Veskimae, was electrocuted at the mine on 6 November 1951.

In August 1953, the mine dismissed 57 workers for striking over the poor quality of food at the mine. Local residents billeted the sacked workers, and the mine was 'declared black' by the North Australian Workers' Union. The workers' jobs were reinstated two weeks later.

The main shaft collapsed at 5 am on 11 August 1967. There were no fatalities, and Nobles Nob became an open-cut mine. Milling resumed in January 1968 using stockpiled ore from the caved-in area.

It closed on 14 January 1985 after almost 50 years of production. The announcement followed the production of only 7299 ounces of gold in the prior financial year.

The Nobles Nob lease is currently owned by Excalibur Mining.
