= Tanami Road =

Road in the Northern Territory and Western Australia

Tanami Road Tanami Track / McGuire Track Northern Territory–Western Australia
- Map of the Northern Territory and northern Western Australia with Tanami Road highlighted in red

General information
- Type: Road
- Length: 1,035 km (643 mi)
- Route number(s): State Route 5 (Northern Territory)

Major junctions
- South-east end: Stuart Highway (National Highway 87), Burt Plain
- North-west end: Great Northern Highway (National Highway 1), Mueller Ranges

Location(s)
- Region: Alice Springs Region

Restrictions
- Fuel supply: Tilmouth Well

The Tanami Road, also known as the Tanami Track, Tanami Highway, and the McGuire Track, is a road in Australia that runs between the Stuart Highway in the Northern Territory and the Great Northern Highway in Western Australia. It is also known as State Route 5 in the Northern Territory. Its southern junction is 19 km (12 mi) north of Alice Springs and the northern junction is 17 km (11 mi) south-west of Halls Creek. It follows a cattle droving route northwest from the MacDonnell Ranges area of central Australia to Halls Creek in the Kimberley.

The Tanami Road is the most direct route from Alice Springs to the Kimberley, passing through the Tanami Desert. Along its route are Yuendumu, the tiny community of Yuelamu, and The Granites gold mine owned by Newmont Mining. In the Northern Territory it passes through land owned by the Aboriginal Warlpiri people, and in Western Australia it passes through pastoral land.

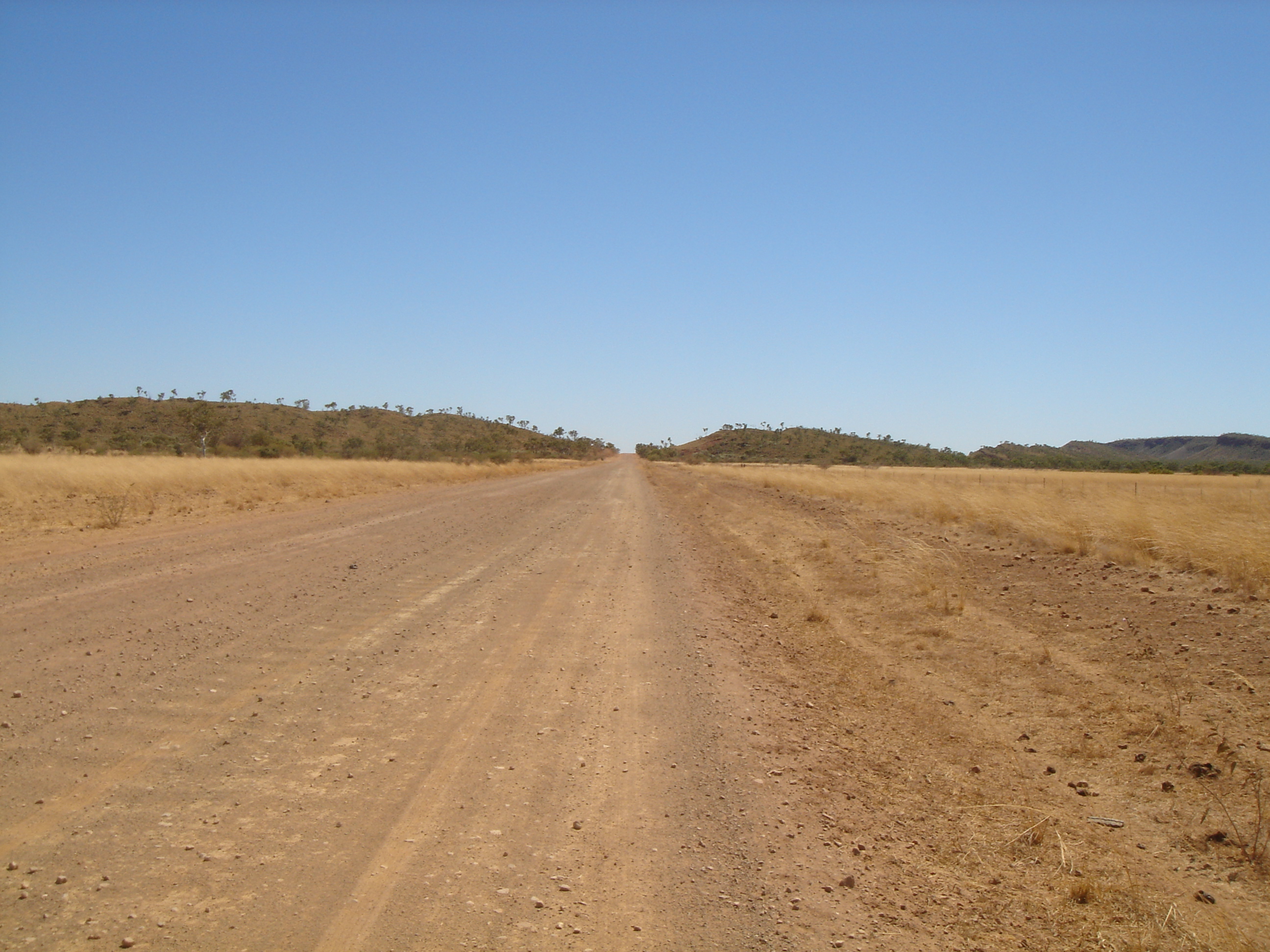
Gravel section of the track

As of 2013, much of the road was unsealed, with 20% of the road bitumen, and the remainder dirt and gravel. Although it is navigable by two-wheel drive vehicles, a four-wheel drive is recommended. Some parts of the road are prone to severe corrugations, making for an uncomfortable and slow drive at times. In January 2020, the federal government committed $235 million to upgrade and seal the road. The Western Australian government committed more than $250 million to sealing its portion of the road in 2022. As of July 2025, over 175 km (109 mi) of the unsealed segments of the road has been upgraded, with work continuing in stages.

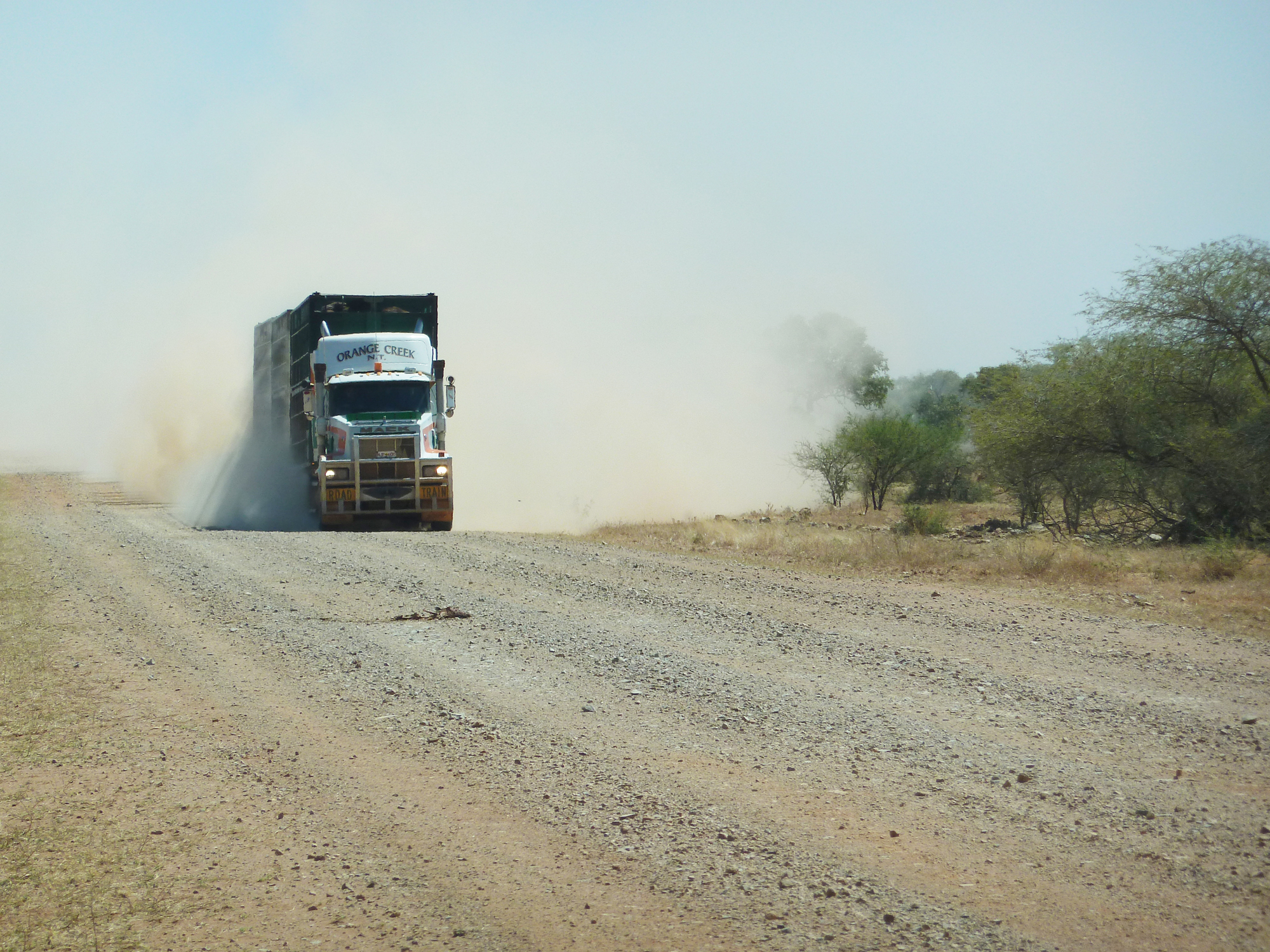
Road train on Tanami Road

The mid-way point, Rabbit Flat, formerly a public roadhouse, was closed indefinitely at the end of 2010, so planning for this journey must take the lack of fuel and supplies into account. Tilmouth Well, located 186 km (116 mi) from Alice Springs between Alice Springs and Rabbit Flat, provides fuel service seven days a week. Carrying adequate fuel and water supplies is essential.

== See also ==
- Canning Stock Route
