= Peko mine =

Mine in Northern Territory, Australia

Peko
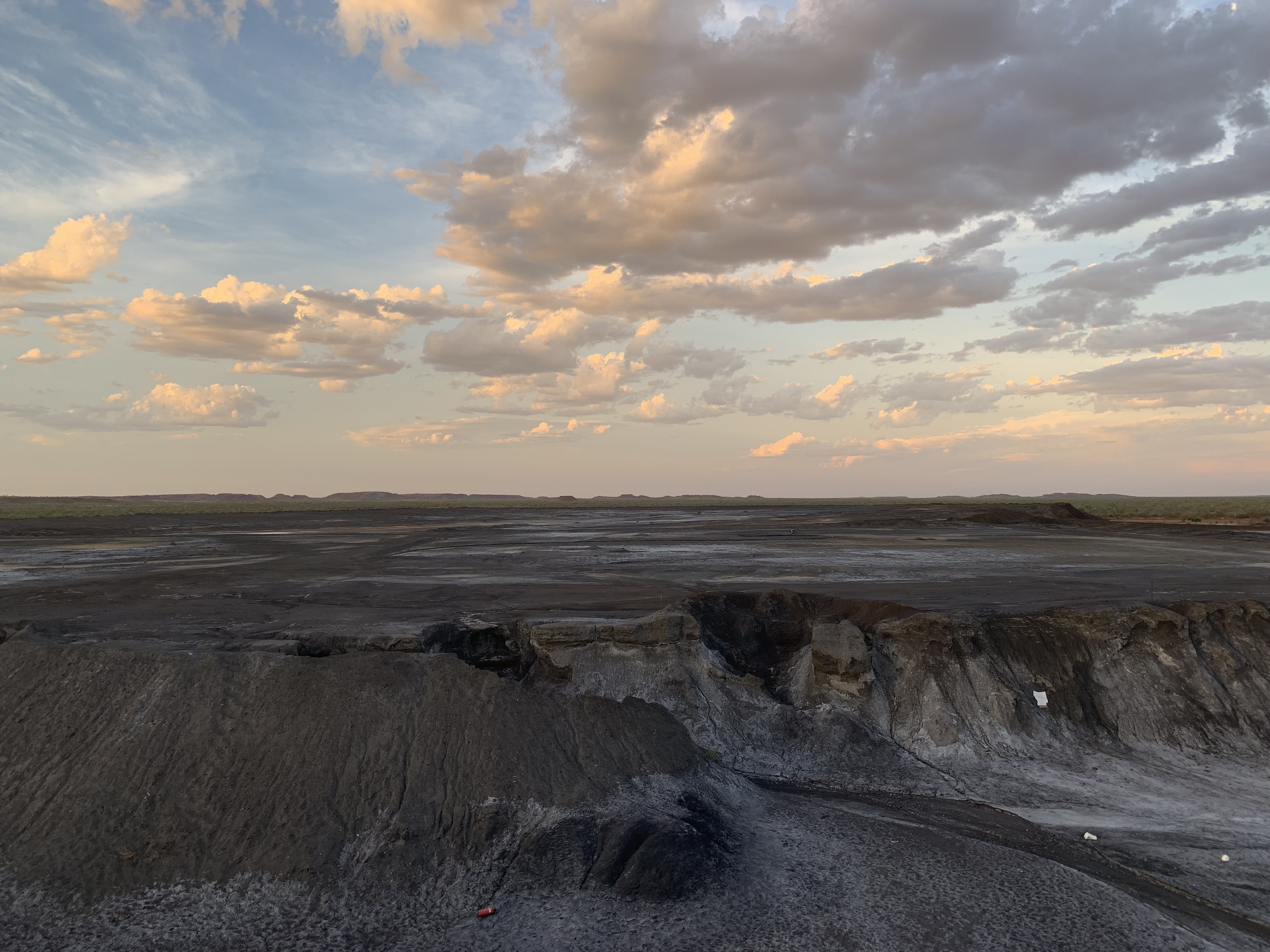
- The Peko Mine Tailings

- Location in the Northern Territory
- Location: Tennant Creek, Northern Territory, Australia; 19°40′59.9988″S 134°16′59.9988″E
- Products: Iron, Gold, Copper, Cobalt

Peko Mine is a mine in Tennant Creek in the Northern Territory of Australia.

== History ==
Peko Mine was located in 1934 by Joe Zaczinski and Bill Bohning. The deposit is named after Joe's dog who was named Peko. They commenced a small gold mining operations before selling their lease to Schmidt in 1934. There was no activity during World War II.

In 1947 a company Peko Gold Mines No Liability was formed, managed by Mr W MacDonald. The mine began operation in 1949 and was further develop developed during 1951 and 1952. The government battery processed the first ore from Peko on 13 March 1951.

Peko closed in November 1981 and is now being restarted for operations with Elmore Limited.
