= Tennant Creek =

Tennant Creek Jurnkkurakurr (Warumungu)
- Town
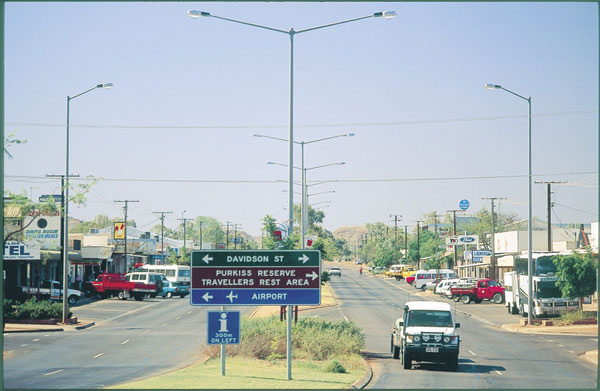
- Main street of Tennant Creek

- Coordinates: 19°38′50″S 134°11′25″E
- Country: Australia
- State: Northern Territory
- LGA: Barkly Region
- Location: 989 km (615 mi) from Darwin; 1,754 km (1,090 mi) from Cairns; 508 km (316 mi) from Alice Springs
- Established: 3 June 1954 (town)

Government
  - Territory electorate: Barkly
  - Federal division: Lingiari

Population
  - Total: 3,080 (2021 census)
- Time zone: UTC+9:30 (ACST)
- Postcode: 0860
- Mean max temp: 31.9 °C (89.4 °F)
- Mean min temp: 19.8 °C (67.6 °F)
- Annual rainfall: 475.0 mm (18.70 in)

Tennant Creek (Warumungu: Jurnkkurakurr) is a town in the Northern Territory of Australia. It is the seventh largest town in the Northern Territory, and is located on the Stuart Highway, just south of the intersection with the western terminus of the Barkly Highway. At the 2021 census, Tennant Creek had a population of 3,080 people, of whom 55% (1,707) identified as Indigenous.

The town is approximately 1,000 kilometres south of the capital of the Northern Territory, Darwin, and 500 kilometres north of Alice Springs. It is named after a nearby watercourse of the same name, and is the hub of the sprawling Barkly Tableland – vast elevated plains of black soil with golden Mitchell grass that cover more than 240,000 square kilometres. Tennant Creek is also near well-known attractions including the Devils Marbles, Mary Ann Dam, Battery Hill Mining Centre and the Nyinkka Nyunyu Culture Centre.

The Barkly Tableland runs east from Tennant Creek towards the Queensland border and is among the most important cattle grazing areas in the Northern Territory. Roughly the same size as the United Kingdom or New Zealand, the region consists largely of open grass plains and some of the world's largest cattle stations. It runs as far south as Barrow Creek, past Elliott to the north and west into the Tanami Desert.

The region encompasses the junction of two great highways, the Barkly and the Stuart, also known as the Overlander and Explorer's Ways. The Overlander's Way (Barkly Highway) retraces the original route of early stockmen who drove their cattle from Queensland through the grazing lands in the Northern Territory.

== Geography ==
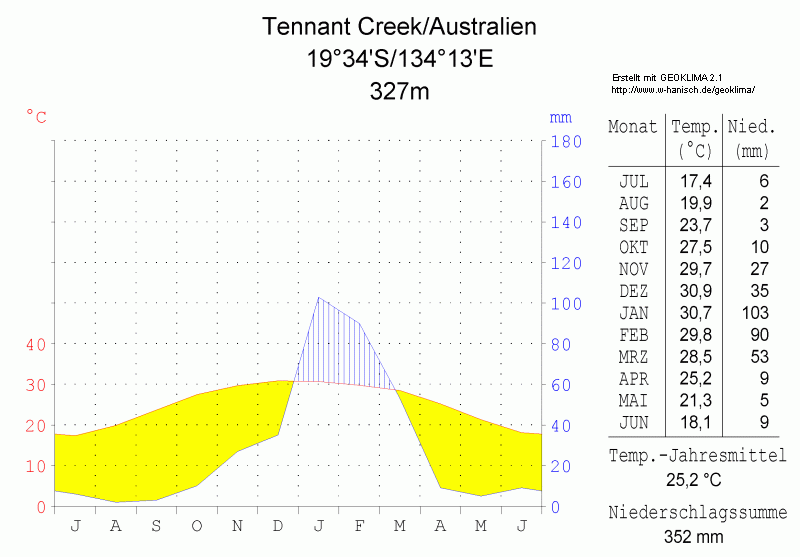
Climate chart of Tennant Creek

Tennant Creek is located in the middle of the Northern Territory, 376.5 metres above sea level. Average maximum temperatures range from 24 degrees to 38 degrees, with an average of 22 days per year exceeding 40 degrees. Minimum temperatures range from 12 degrees in winter to 25 degrees in the hotter months.

== Climate ==
Tennant Creek experiences a tropical semi-arid climate (Köppen: BSh, Trewartha: BShb/BShl), with a short, very hot wet season from December to February, and a long, hot dry season from March to November. Due to the length of the dry season, and very high evapotranspiration, the vegetation exhibits influences of a warm desert climate (Köppen: BWh, Trewartha: BWhb/BWhl). Tennant Creek gets 181.0 clear days annually, and its climate is comparable to Paraguay's vast, sparsely populated Gran Chaco region.

The brief wet season is very hot, moderately rainy, and experiences higher humidity than the rest of the year. The prevailing winds are from the Arafura Sea, but the large size of the Northern Territory's Top End reduces the amount of precipitation in communities further inland, such as Tennant Creek, and contributes to the season's high amount of sunshine. The moderating influence of the ocean is greater during this season, as temperature swings are not as severe as the rest of the year. Extremes range from a minimum of 15.7 °C (60.3 °F) to a maximum of 45.6 °C (114.1 °F). Additionally, over 70% of Tennant Creek's 494.7 mm (19.48 in) of annual precipitation occurs during this season, and contributes to being in the Tropical Thorn Woodlands biome under the Holdridge Life Zones classification. Occasionally, flooding can pose a major risk in the area, such as during January 2022, when one person drowned in floodwaters at Seven Mile Bridge, to the north of Tennant Creek.

The long dry season is characterised by warm to hot temperatures, little to no precipitation, very low relative humidity, and an abundance of sunshine. Due to the prevailing winds from the east to south-east, Tennant Creek sits in the rain shadow of the Great Dividing Range, where most precipitation from the Coral and Tasman Seas is dropped on the windward slopes near the Pacific Ocean. During the midst of winter, nights are usually cool, averaging 12.7 °C (54.9 °F) in July, but the settlement has never experienced frost, only falling to 5.6 °C (42.1 °F) in June, placing Tennant Creek in Hardiness Zone 11. Due to the combination of warm to hot conditions and minimal precipitation, droughts and bushfires can occur.

Climate data for Tennant Creek Airport (1991–2020 normals, extremes 1969–present); 376 m AMSL; 19° 38′ 32.28″ S
Month	Jan	Feb	Mar	Apr	May	Jun	Jul	Aug	Sep	Oct	Nov	Dec	Year
Record high °C (°F)	45.6 (114.1)	44.5 (112.1)	42.9 (109.2)	38.4 (101.1)	36.8 (98.2)	34.0 (93.2)	35.2 (95.4)	36.4 (97.5)	39.4 (102.9)	43.0 (109.4)	43.4 (110.1)	45.4 (113.7)	45.6 (114.1)
Mean daily maximum °C (°F)	36.7 (98.1)	35.8 (96.4)	34.8 (94.6)	32.4 (90.3)	27.7 (81.9)	24.8 (76.6)	25.1 (77.2)	27.6 (81.7)	32.5 (90.5)	35.2 (95.4)	36.9 (98.4)	37.0 (98.6)	32.2 (90.0)
Daily mean °C (°F)	30.9 (87.6)	30.2 (86.4)	29.2 (84.6)	26.7 (80.1)	22.1 (71.8)	19.0 (66.2)	18.9 (66.0)	21.0 (69.8)	25.8 (78.4)	28.6 (83.5)	30.6 (87.1)	31.0 (87.8)	26.2 (79.1)
Mean daily minimum °C (°F)	25.0 (77.0)	24.5 (76.1)	23.5 (74.3)	20.9 (69.6)	16.4 (61.5)	13.2 (55.8)	12.7 (54.9)	14.4 (57.9)	19.1 (66.4)	22.0 (71.6)	24.2 (75.6)	25.0 (77.0)	20.1 (68.1)
Record low °C (°F)	17.2 (63.0)	17.2 (63.0)	14.6 (58.3)	11.5 (52.7)	6.7 (44.1)	5.3 (41.5)	4.5 (40.1)	6.0 (42.8)	7.4 (45.3)	11.6 (52.9)	10.7 (51.3)	15.7 (60.3)	4.5 (40.1)
Average precipitation mm (inches)	128.2 (5.05)	132.9 (5.23)	45.7 (1.80)	15.0 (0.59)	8.1 (0.32)	4.1 (0.16)	3.9 (0.15)	2.4 (0.09)	5.0 (0.20)	16.9 (0.67)	45.7 (1.80)	86.8 (3.42)	494.7 (19.48)
Average precipitation days (≥ 1.0 mm)	8.2	8.0	3.3	1.1	1.0	0.7	0.5	0.2	1.1	2.5	3.9	6.7	37.2
Average afternoon relative humidity (%)	33	37	28	24	26	26	22	17	17	19	22	29	25
Average dew point °C (°F)	13.4 (56.1)	14.9 (58.8)	10.4 (50.7)	6.5 (43.7)	3.9 (39.0)	2.1 (35.8)	−0.2 (31.6)	−1.3 (29.7)	1.5 (34.7)	3.0 (37.4)	7.5 (45.5)	11.5 (52.7)	6.1 (43.0)
Mean monthly sunshine hours	285.2	257.1	291.4	297.0	303.8	294.0	313.1	331.7	309.0	313.1	294.0	275.9	3,565.3
Mean daily sunshine hours	9.2	9.1	9.4	9.9	9.8	9.8	10.1	10.7	10.3	10.1	9.8	8.9	9.8
Source: Australian Bureau of Meteorology

== Built environment ==
Tennant Creek has developed from its rough, tough droving and gold mining days into a modern town with shops and a supermarket, accommodation, bars, clubs and restaurants, a regional hospital, schools and banking facilities.

=== Parks and gardens ===
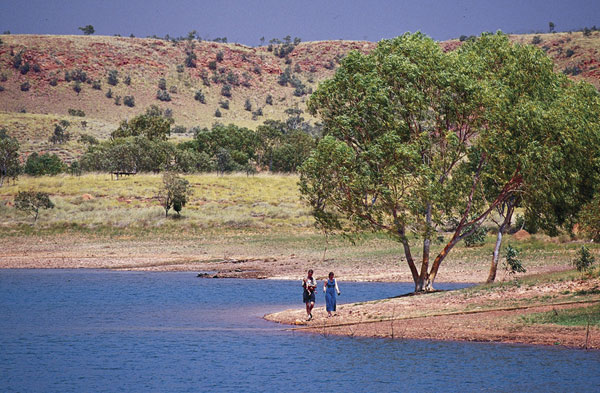
Mary Ann Dam

Mary Ann Dam is a popular recreation spot, easily accessible from town by road or bicycle track and popular for swimming, barbecues, picnics or bush walks. The area's best known attraction, Karlu Karlu / Devils Marbles Conservation Reserve, is 100 kilometres south of Tennant Creek and is one of the Territory's most photographed features. These huge granite boulders are scattered through a wide, shallow valley. The formations provide shelter to a variety of flora and fauna of the area and glow a rich red in the light of the early evening. Local Aboriginal mythology holds that the boulders are the eggs of the Rainbow Serpent. Visitors can take a self-guided walk from the car park. Bush camping facilities are available.

Another popular spot close to Tennant Creek is the Iytwelepenty / Davenport Ranges National Park, best explored by four-wheel-drive vehicle.

== History ==
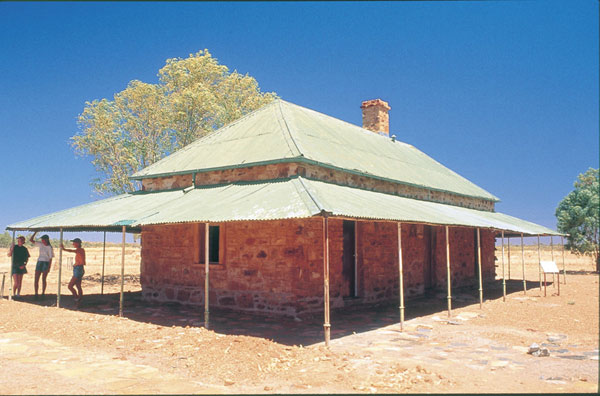
Telegraph Station – Tennant Creek

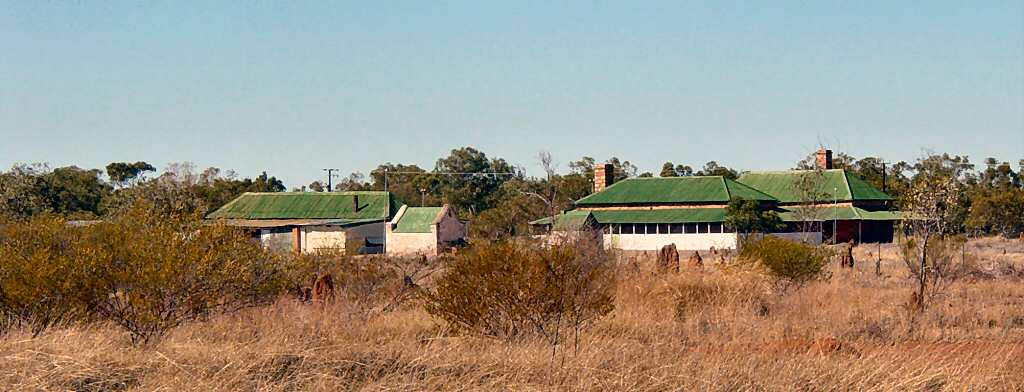
Buildings of the Overland Telegraph Station

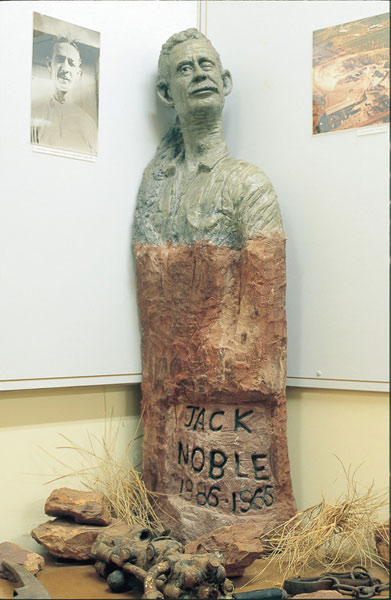
Sculpture depicting Jack Noble

The Warumungu people have lived in the region surrounding Tennant Creek for thousands of years. The traditional name for the creek north of where the town is now located is Jurnkkurakurr, although it is now used to refer to the area of the township as well. The first European explorer to pass through the region was John McDouall Stuart in 1860, on his unsuccessful first attempt to cross the continent from south to north. He named a creek to the north of the town after John Tennant, a financier of his expedition and a pastoralist from Port Lincoln, South Australia, in gratitude for the financial help Tennant had provided for Stuart's expeditions across Australia.

The Australian Overland Telegraph Line, that once allowed communication between southern Australian cities and London, was constructed in the 1870s and forged a corridor through the middle of the continent that the Explorer's Way and Ghan train now travel. A temporary building for a telegraph repeater station was erected near the watercourse of Tennant Creek in 1872. Two years later, the solid stone buildings of the Tennant Creek Telegraph Station, which remain on the site today, were completed by the occupants of the station. This is one of the four remaining original telegraph stations in Australia. Tennant Creek was the site of Australia's last gold rush during the 1930s and at that time was the third-largest gold producer in Australia. The Tennant Creek Telegraph Station remained an isolated outpost until that time.

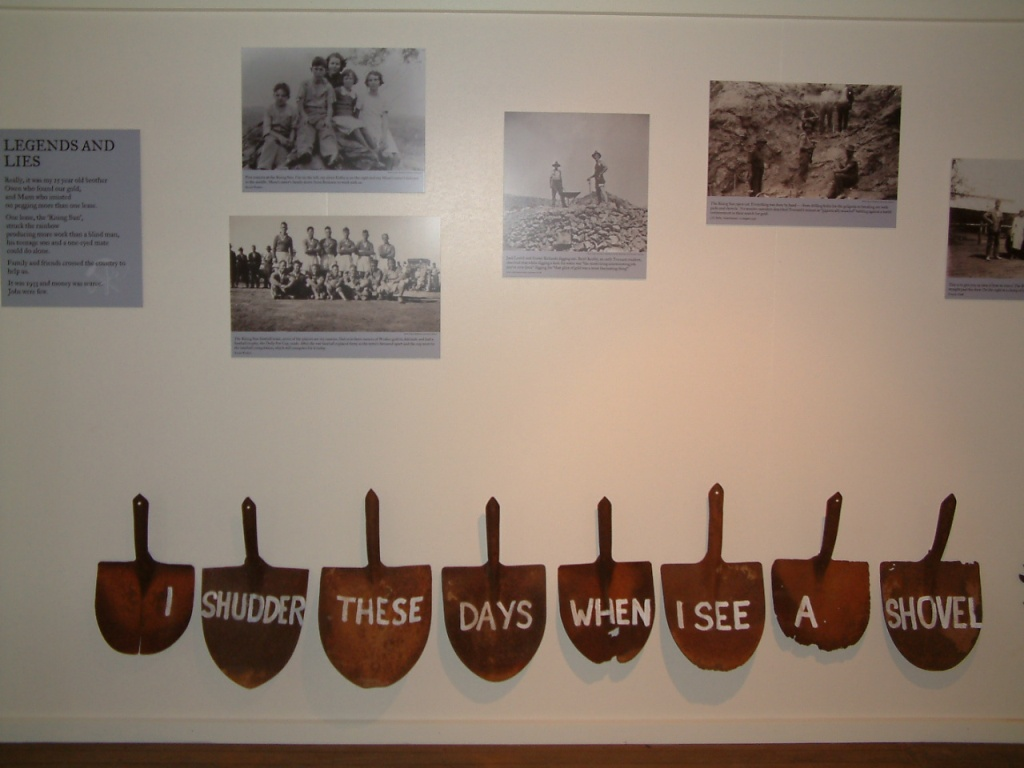
Mining in Tennant Creek was very hard work because gold in the area is found in iron ore.

Gold was discovered in the ranges three miles north of the current town area in 1926 by J Smith Roberts. In 1927 Charles Windley, a telegraph operator, found gold on what would become Tennant Creek's first mine, The Great Northern. Australia's last great gold rush did not commence, however, until after Frank Juppurla, a local Indigenous man, took gold to telegraph operator Woody Woodruffe in December 1932. The population quickly grew to about 600, 60 of whom were women and children. "Battery Hill", overlooking the town of Tennant Creek, is the site of one of the last two operating ten-head stamp batteries, a government-owned ore crushing machine.

The town of Tennant Creek was located 12 km south of the watercourse because the Overland Telegraph Station had been allocated an 11 km reserve. Local legend offers a different explanation for the town's location. In 1934 Joe Kilgarriff from Alice Springs built the Tennant Creek hotel on the eastern side of the telegraph line, the building supplies being delivered on the first commercial journey of the AEC Roadtrain from Alice Springs. The pub still exists and is a historic monument to the early days.

Cecil Armstrong was one man who made a contribution to the early development of Tennant Creek. He arrived in April 1935 and began baking bread the next day. In 1937 he built Armstrong's bakery and cafe, where he lived and worked for more than twenty years as baker and cafe proprietor. The building still stands today, albeit under a different guise. Cecil's telephone number was simply the number 1 and his post office box was also number 1.

Another important contributor to Tennant life was Mrs Weaber, wife of the blind owner of the Rising Sun Mine, one of the richest gold mines in the district before World War II. A devout Catholic, Weaber paid for the old church at Pine Creek to be transported to Tennant Creek plank by wooden plank, thereby establishing the Tennant Creek Catholic Church. Weaber also started the Tennant Creek Christmas tree event, when in the early 1930s she held a party at her husband's gold mine and gave every child on the gold field a present. Weaber's generosity continues into the present day. Every year the town erects a public Christmas tree and every child, local or visitor, is given a present. The Weaber family left Tennant Creek in 1940 following a series of personal family tragedies. They sold the lease to what would become Tennant's richest post war mine, Nobles Nob, before they realised its potential. Nobles Nob was named after Jack Noble, an old friend of the Weaber family from the days when they all lived in the Kimberley Region of Western Australia.

Gold mining was all but shut down in Tennant Creek in 1942. The only mine to remain operational was a large mine with its own crushing plant. During World War II, the Australian Army set up the 55th Australian Camp Hospital near Tennant Creek. The Royal Australian Air Force utilised Tennant Creek Airfield as an emergency landing ground.

On 22 January 1988 the town was struck by a sequence of strong earthquakes.

The town today is situated on a stretch of the Stuart Highway known as Paterson Street. As it is a regional centre, it contains government services and local business and also has a developing tourist centre. There are a number of restaurants and tourist activities. The people of Tennant Creek enjoy modern facilities including reserves, sporting venues, galleries and a civic hall. It is also home to Australia's premier go-karting event, held on a street circuit through the town.

== Demographics ==
The population of Tennant Creek as of the 2021 census is 3,080 people, of whom 1,707 (55.4%) are Aboriginal.

== Government ==
Tennant Creek had a town council headed by a mayor until 1 July 2008, when it became part of the Barkly Region.

The main Aboriginal body within the town is the Julalikari Council Aboriginal Corporation, which plays a major role in providing training and employment services for the Aboriginal people in Tennant Creek. It has developed a construction capacity and provides contract services to the town council, such as recycling. Julalikari also provides community services within the township, such as homemakers, aged care, and the night patrol.

The police district covers almost 22,000 square kilometres and has a strength of 25 officers. The force includes two Criminal Investigation Branch (CIB) officers.

== Economy ==
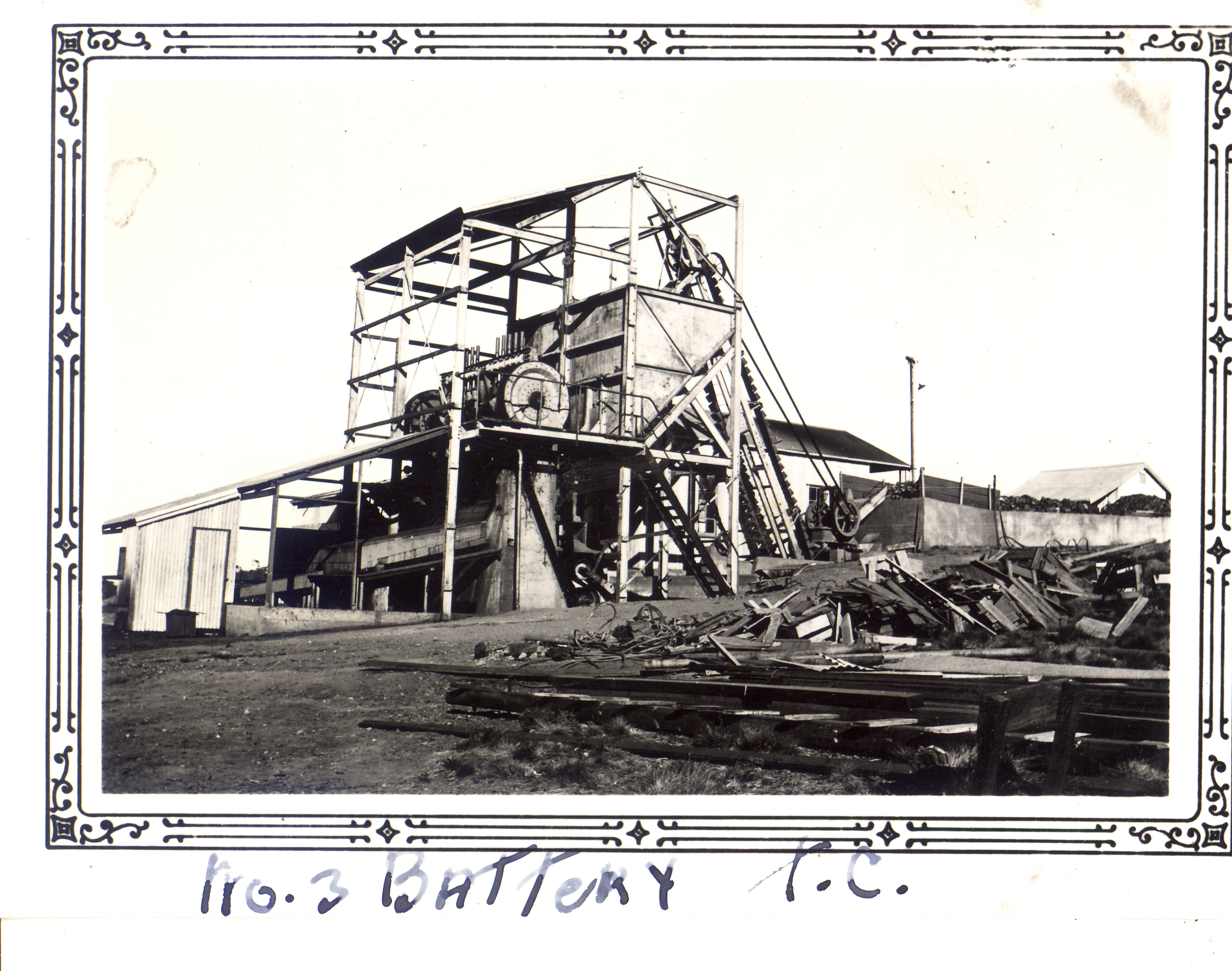
No 3 Battery Tennant Creek, 1938 - 1938

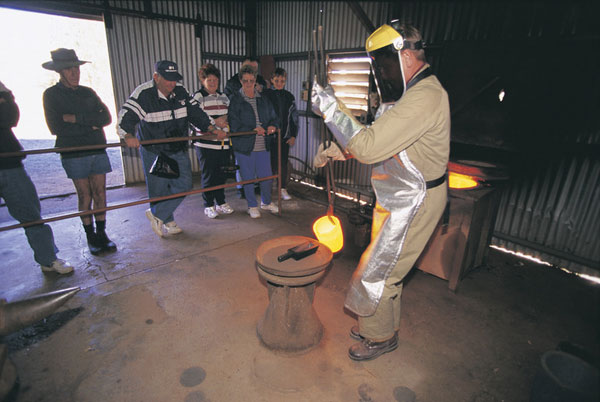
Battery Hill Complex – daily mock up of gold pouring

=== Mining ===
Tennant Creek was once the third largest gold producer in Australia and is still highly productive. Over 210 tonnes of gold have been mined in the area. Notable former mines include the Nobles Nob and the Peko mines which were established in 1933 and 1934 respectively.

The Bootu Mine to the north of town exports manganese to China and major mining companies are continuing to explore for bauxite, lead, zinc, silver and copper around the area. Exploration has commenced to the southeast of the town for unspecified minerals.

=== Energy ===
The nearby town of Elliott is the proposed site of a very large solar panel installation that is part of the Sun Cable project.

=== Tourism ===
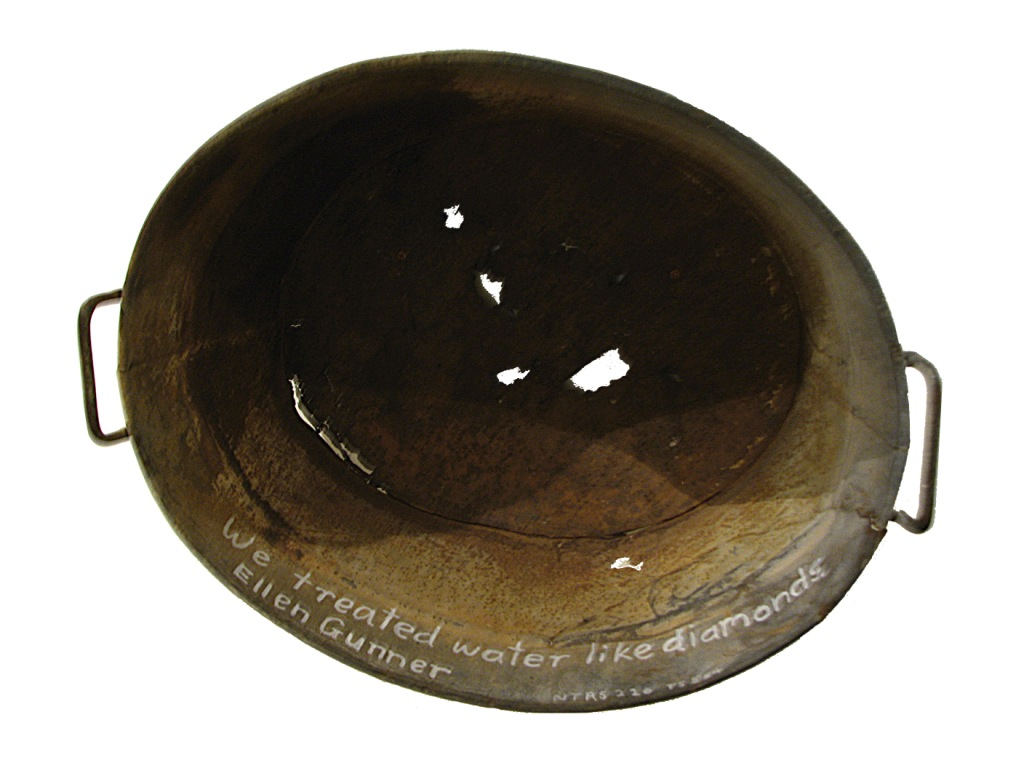
Washing bowl from Freedom, Fortitude and Flies, a social history exhibition

Tourism is a growing industry emphasising its location, history, scenery and cultural attributes, and provides tourists with an opportunity to experience the outback. The mineral collection at Battery Hill is a must-see, although the stamp battery ceased working in 2005, but has since been refurbished and now operates daily for tours. The exhibition Freedom, Fortitude and Flies in the social history museum at Battery Hill tells the story of mining in Tennant Creek through the eyes of women and children. It was designed by award-winning artist Alison Alder, a former Tennant Creek resident.

Nyinkka Nyunyu Arts and Culture Centre opened in July 2003, offering visitors and the community an opportunity to learn about Aboriginal life, history, and culture.

== Transport ==
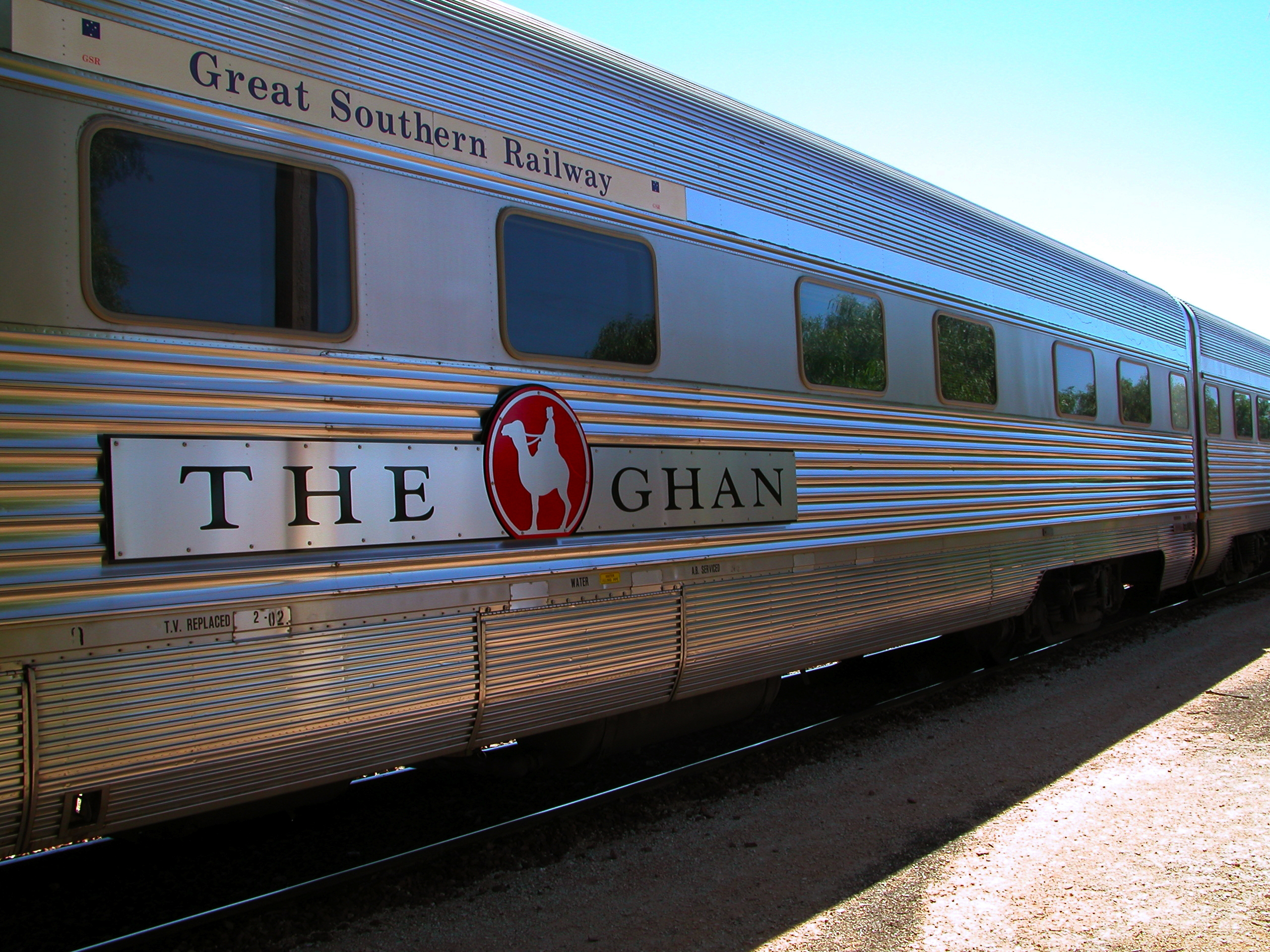
A Ghan carriage

Tennant Creek has been accessible by train since the completion of the Adelaide-Darwin railway north from Alice Springs in 2004. The Ghan, run by Great Southern Rail between Adelaide and Darwin, passes twice weekly in each direction.

Tennant Creek is serviced by Tennant Creek Airport, with scheduled flights to Alice Springs and Darwin. Outback Airlines currently services Tennant Creek, providing mining charters between Alice Springs and Tennant Creek with seats available to the general public.

Tennant Creek has daily coach services from Darwin, Alice Springs, and previously Queensland (closed due to the COVID-19 pandemic). The Barkly Tablelands are best explored via Tennant Creek, which can be accessed on the fully sealed Explorer's Way, 1,000 kilometres south of Darwin, 670 kilometres south of Katherine and 510 kilometres north of Alice Springs. The Overlander's Way (Barkly Highway) is another tourism drive from Queensland that meets the Explorer's Way at Threeways – 25 kilometres north of Tennant Creek.

In May 2005, Minemakers and ATEC signed an agreement to study a 250 km open access railway from Tennant Creek to Wonarah.

Historically, there has been suggestion of a rail link between Tennant Creek and Mount Isa. This link would allow resources companies to gain access to both the Adelaide-Darwin (The Ghan) and Townsville-Mount Isa (The Inlander) lines. The missing rail link would also provide rail passengers with direct rail access to Darwin from the east coast of Australia. The Australian Defence Force may also use the link to provide a rail access between the 1st Brigade in Darwin, and the 3rd Brigade in Townsville.

== Education ==
Tennant Creek has a primary and high school. In the 1970s and 1980s, secondary students tended to leave Tennant Creek and board at secondary schools in Darwin and Alice Springs, but today young people prefer to remain at schools in Tennant Creek.

== Society and culture ==
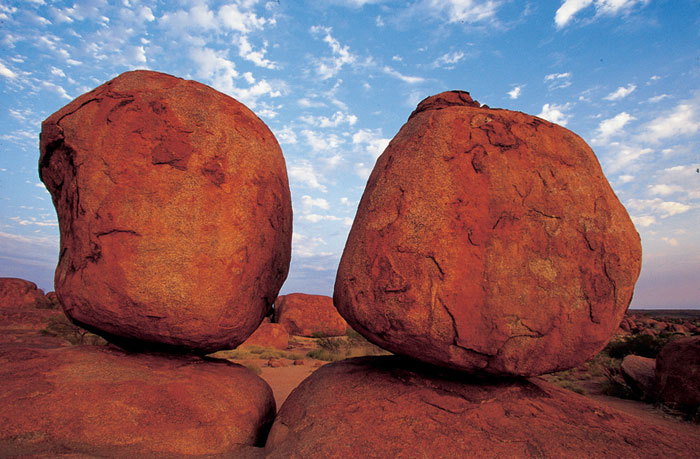
Karlu Karlu / Devils Marbles

Aboriginal people have lived in the Barkly region for over 40,000 years. The Barkly region is steeped in the ancient traditions and beliefs of its traditional custodians, and around nine Aboriginal groups, including the Warumungu, Warlpiri, Kaytetye and Alyawarre people, call the area home. Tennant Creek is an important social, cultural and business centre for many Aboriginal people of various language groups.

=== Leisure and entertainment ===
The Northern Territory holds several regional events throughout the year, which in some cases can have an impact on visitor numbers to the region. Events located within the Barkly Area during the year include the Desert Harmony Festival, the Barkly Campdraft and Rodeo, Saint Patrick's Day Races, Barkly May Day Muster and the Brunette Downs Races. The World Solar Car Challenge takes place every second year.

The Tennant Creek Public Library services the people of the town and surrounding area.

=== The arts ===
Tennant Creek has a musical community, and the Winanjjikari Music Centre is home to a number of emerging singers, songwriters and musicians.

The Artists of the Barkly collective is supported by Barkly Regional Arts. It represents more than 50 Aboriginal artists living in five remote communities across the region: Tennant Creek, Wutunugurra (Epenarra), Owairtilla (Canteen Creek), and Kulumindini (Elliott), and Mungkarta (McLaren Creek).

Initiated by the Warumungu community of Tennant Creek in 1995, the Nyinkka Nyunyu Art and Culture Centre was opened in 2003. It is a purpose-built centre, which houses displays covering five topics: bush tucker and resources, Country, language, history, and Punttu (family). It is run by the Julalikari Council Aboriginal Corporation.

=== Sport and recreation ===
There are a number of sports and recreation clubs in Tennant Creek for locals some are Tennant Creek Bowling Club, Tennant Creek Golf Club, Tennant Creek Gun Club, Tennant Creek Soccer Club, Tennant Creek Swimming Pool.

Tennant Creek Speedway (19°37′28″S 134°11′56″E) just north of the town, on the Kaczinsky Road, hosted important motorcycle speedway events, including qualifying rounds of the Speedway World Championship (starting in 1985).

Four Tennant Creek based clubs play in the regional Barkly Australian Football League Australian rules football competition.

Tennant Creek Cricket Association returned after 20 years without a competition.

The Tennant Creek Youth Centre will host basketball.

NRL Northern Territory administered Central Australian Rugby Football League, with teams playing from Alice Springs and wider communities including Tennant Creek and Yuendumu.

== Crime ==
Tennant Creek is known for having one of the highest crime rates in Australia, especially among its local Aboriginal population. Much of the crime is violent and stems from alcohol.

Tennant Creek is consistently ranked among the most dangerous towns in Australia, and as of 2023 it was the most dangerous town in the Northern Territory.

In January 2017, the estimated homicide rate in Tennant Creek was 59.6 per 100,000 people, almost double the rate in the United States.

=== Domestic violence and sexual assault ===
Rising rates of sexual assaults (including on children), alcohol abuse, domestic violence and family disputes between locals have been raised by numerous media sources and identified as a region of legitimate concern in comparison to other states and isolated townships.

== Twin towns ==
- Ballard, Utah, United States
