= Electoral results for the Division of Northern Territory =

Historical election results for Division of Northern Territory, Australia

This is a list of electoral results for the Division of Northern Territory in Australian federal elections from the division's creation in 1922 until its abolition in 2001.

== Members ==
Member	Party	Term
Harold Nelson	Labor	1922–1934
Adair Blain	Independent	1934–1949
Jock Nelson	Labor	1949–1966
Sam Calder	Country	1966–1974
Sam Calder	Country Liberal	1974–1980
Grant Tambling	Country Liberal	1980–1983
John Reeves	Labor	1983–1984
Paul Everingham	Country Liberal	1984–1987
Warren Snowdon	Labor	1987–1996
Nick Dondas	Country Liberal	1996–1998
Warren Snowdon	Labor	1998–2001

== Election results ==
=== Elections in the 1990s ===
==== 1998 ====
1998 Australian federal election: Northern Territory
Party	Candidate	Votes	%	±%
Labor	Warren Snowdon	38,469	42.30	−1.20
Country Liberal	Nick Dondas	36,014	39.60	−5.44
One Nation	Peter Schirmer	7,401	8.14	+8.14
Democrats	Craig Seiler	4,658	5.12	+5.12
Greens	Ilana Eldridge	2,753	3.03	−3.23
Independent	Barry Nattrass	1,018	1.12	+1.12
Democratic Socialist	Natalie Zirngast	624	0.69	+0.69
Total formal votes		90,937	95.84	−0.77
Informal votes		3,951	4.16	+0.77
Turnout		94,888	90.33	+1.23
Two-party-preferred result
Labor	Warren Snowdon	45,986	50.57	+0.94
Country Liberal	Nick Dondas	44,951	49.43	−0.94
Labor gain from Country Liberal		Swing	+0.94	

==== 1996 ====
1996 Australian federal election: Northern Territory
Party	Candidate	Votes	%	±%
Country Liberal	Nick Dondas	38,302	45.04	+0.35
Labor	Warren Snowdon	36,994	43.50	−11.81
Greens	Philip Nitschke	5,324	6.26	+6.26
Independent	Bernie Brian	2,710	3.19	+3.19
Independent	Pamela Gardiner	1,713	2.01	+2.01
Total formal votes		85,043	96.61	−0.29
Informal votes		2,985	3.39	+0.29
Turnout		88,028	89.10	+0.30
Two-party-preferred result
Country Liberal	Nick Dondas	42,630	50.37	+5.68
Labor	Warren Snowdon	42,003	49.63	−5.68
Country Liberal gain from Labor		Swing	+5.68	

==== 1993 ====
1993 Australian federal election: Northern Territory
Party	Candidate	Votes	%	±%
Labor	Warren Snowdon	43,578	55.31	+5.35
Country Liberal	Arthur Palmer	35,207	44.69	+4.15
Total formal votes		78,785	96.90	+0.28
Informal votes		2,518	3.10	−0.28
Turnout		81,303	88.79	
Labor hold		Swing	+0.29	

==== 1990 ====
1990 Australian federal election: Northern Territory
Party	Candidate	Votes	%	±%
Labor	Warren Snowdon	34,106	50.0	+3.1
Country Liberal	Helen Galton	27,668	40.5	+4.5
Independent	Don Beaton	1,900	2.8	+2.8
Independent	Bob Liddle	1,427	2.1	+2.1
Independent	Tig Donnellan	1,380	2.0	+2.0
Independent	Strider	975	1.4	+1.4
Independent	Ron Sterry	801	1.2	+1.2
Total formal votes		68,257	96.6	
Informal votes		2,387	3.4	
Turnout		70,644	89.4	
Two-party-preferred result
Labor	Warren Snowdon	37,498	55.0	+2.8
Country Liberal	Helen Galton	30,650	45.0	−2.8
Labor hold		Swing	+2.8	

=== Elections in the 1980s ===
==== 1987 ====
1987 Australian federal election: Northern Territory
Party	Candidate	Votes	%	±%
Labor	Warren Snowdon	28,195	46.9	+2.0
Country Liberal	Peter Paroulakis	21,668	36.0	−12.8
NT Nationals	Bob Liddle	10,273	17.1	+17.1
Total formal votes		60,136	94.2	
Informal votes		3,684	5.8	
Turnout		63,820	79.9	
Two-party-preferred result
Labor	Warren Snowdon	31,386	52.2	+3.6
Country Liberal	Peter Paroulakis	28,723	47.8	−3.6
Labor gain from Country Liberal		Swing	+3.6	

==== 1984 ====
1984 Australian federal election: Northern Territory
Party	Candidate	Votes	%	±%
Country Liberal	Paul Everingham	27,335	48.8	+2.0
Labor	John Reeves	25,140	44.9	−1.7
Democrats	Wiyendji Roberts	1,906	3.4	−0.1
Independent	Phil Ward	1,191	2.1	+2.1
Independent	Strider	390	0.7	+0.1
Total formal votes		55,962	95.1	
Informal votes		2,909	4.9	
Turnout		58,871	85.5	
Two-party-preferred result
Country Liberal	Paul Everingham	28,747	51.4	+3.3
Labor	John Reeves	27,194	48.6	−3.3
Country Liberal gain from Labor		Swing	+3.3	

==== 1983 ====
1983 Australian federal election: Northern Territory
Party	Candidate	Votes	%	±%
Labor	John Reeves	20,764	46.6	+6.2
Country Liberal	Grant Tambling	20,479	45.9	+2.3
Democrats	Joy King	1,571	3.5	−2.3
Independent	Bill Cain	1,132	2.5	+2.5
Independent	Pamela Gardiner	395	0.9	−1.7
Independent	Strider	252	0.6	+0.6
Total formal votes		44,593	95.6	
Informal votes		2,070	4.4	
Turnout		46,663	81.4	
Two-party-preferred result
Labor	John Reeves	23,132	51.9	+3.1
Country Liberal	Grant Tambling	21,461	48.1	−3.1
Labor gain from Country Liberal		Swing	+3.1	

==== 1980 ====
1980 Australian federal election: Northern Territory
Party	Candidate	Votes	%	±%
Country Liberal	Grant Tambling	18,805	43.6	−3.8
Labor	John Waters	17,426	40.4	−2.2
Democrats	Max Stewart	2,509	5.8	−1.3
Independent	Galarrwuy Yunupingu	2,415	5.6	+5.6
Independent	Pamela Gardiner	1,129	2.6	+2.6
Marijuana	Graham Gillian	486	1.1	+1.1
Christian Democrat	John McElroy	272	0.6	+0.6
Independent	Malcolm Womersley	130	0.3	+0.3
Total formal votes		43,172	95.1	
Informal votes		2,231	4.9	
Turnout		45,403	82.3	
Two-party-preferred result
Country Liberal	Grant Tambling	22,090	51.2	−1.3
Labor	John Waters	21,082	48.8	+1.3
Country Liberal hold		Swing	−1.3	

=== Elections in the 1970s ===
==== 1977 ====
1977 Australian federal election: Northern Territory
Party	Candidate	Votes	%	±%
Country Liberal	Sam Calder	16,462	50.0	+3.1
Labor	John Waters	14,811	42.6	−1.1
Democrats	Josephine Read	2,478	7.1	+7.1
Progress	Ian Smith	987	2.8	+2.8
Total formal votes		34,738	96.5	
Informal votes		1,244	3.5	
Turnout		35,982	81.2	
Two-party-preferred result
Country Liberal	Sam Calder	18,250	52.5	−2.4
Labor	John Waters	16,488	47.5	+2.4
Country Liberal hold		Swing	−2.4	

==== 1975 ====
1975 Australian federal election: Northern Territory
Party	Candidate	Votes	%	±%
Country Liberal	Sam Calder	15,976	53.9	+4.6
Labor	Jock Nelson	12,944	43.7	−1.8
Australia	James Forbes	701	2.4	+2.4
Total formal votes		29,621	96.7	
Informal votes		996	3.3	
Turnout		30,617	74.9	
Two-party-preferred result
Country Liberal	Sam Calder		54.9	+2.2
Labor	Jock Nelson		45.1	−2.2
Country Liberal hold		Swing	+2.2	

==== 1974 ====
1974 Australian federal election: Northern Territory
Party	Candidate	Votes	%	±%
Country	Sam Calder	14,514	49.3	+2.0
Labor	John Waters	13,397	45.5	+6.2
Independent	Alexander Allan-Stewart	1,557	5.3	−2.1
Total formal votes		29,468	97.2	
Informal votes		852	2.8	
Turnout		30,320	83.1	
Two-party-preferred result
Country	Sam Calder	15,522	52.7	−1.8
Labor	John Waters	13,946	47.3	+1.8
Country hold		Swing	−1.8	

==== 1972 ====
1972 Australian federal election: Northern Territory
Party	Candidate	Votes	%	±%
Country	Sam Calder	11,657	47.3	−1.1
Labor	Ted Robertson	9,676	39.3	+8.9
Independent	Alexander Allan-Stewart	1,821	7.4	+7.4
Australia	Gordon Briscoe	944	3.8	+3.8
Independent	William Walsh	349	1.4	+1.4
Australia	Charles Moffatt	185	0.8	+0.8
Total formal votes		24,632	95.4	
Informal votes		1,176	4.6	
Turnout		25,808	86.2	
Two-party-preferred result
Country	Sam Calder	13,416	54.5	−4.7
Labor	Ted Robertson	11,216	45.5	+4.7
Country hold		Swing	−4.7	

=== Elections in the 1960s ===
==== 1969 ====
1969 Australian federal election: Northern Territory
Party	Candidate	Votes	%	±%
Country	Sam Calder	8,281	48.4	−3.3
Labor	Ted Robertson	5,204	30.4	−17.9
Independent	Harold Brennan	3,377	19.7	+19.7
Independent	Alan Gray	252	1.5	+1.5
Total formal votes		17,114	96.5	
Informal votes		613	3.5	
Turnout		17,727	83.7	
Two-party-preferred result
Country	Sam Calder	10,137	59.2	+7.5
Labor	Ted Robertson	6,977	40.8	−7.5
Country hold		Swing	+7.5	

==== 1966 ====
1966 Australian federal election: Northern Territory
Party	Candidate	Votes	%	±%
Country	Sam Calder	7,221	51.7	+51.7
Labor	Richard Ward	6,734	48.3	−51.7
Total formal votes		13,955	96.5	
Informal votes		500	3.5	
Turnout		14,455	83.1	
Country gain from Labor		Swing	+51.7	

==== 1963 ====
1963 Australian federal election: Northern Territory
Party	Candidate	Votes	%	±%
Labor	Jock Nelson	unopposed		
Labor hold		Swing		

==== 1961 ====
1961 Australian federal election: Northern Territory
Party	Candidate	Votes	%	±%
Labor	Jock Nelson	4,659	51.0	−22.9
Independent	Harold Brennan	4,468	49.0	+49.0
Total formal votes		9,127	96.4	
Informal votes		343	3.6	
Turnout		9,470	78.1	
Labor hold		Swing	−22.9	

=== Elections in the 1950s ===
==== 1958 ====
1958 Australian federal election: Northern Territory
Party	Candidate	Votes	%	±%
Labor	Jock Nelson	4,153	73.9	−26.1
Independent	James Martin	1,469	26.1	+26.1
Total formal votes		5,622	96.2	
Informal votes		221	3.8	
Turnout		5,843	76.1	
Labor hold		Swing	−26.1	

==== 1955 ====
1955 Australian federal election: Northern Territory
Party	Candidate	Votes	%	±%
Labor	Jock Nelson	unopposed		
Labor hold		Swing		

==== 1954 ====
1954 Australian federal election: Northern Territory
Party	Candidate	Votes	%	±%
Labor	Jock Nelson	4,021	77.6	+13.5
Country	Ralph Edwards	1,163	22.4	+0.8
Total formal votes		5,184	97.8	
Informal votes		115	2.2	
Turnout		5,229	77.1	
Labor hold		Swing	+1.3	

==== 1951 ====
1951 Australian federal election: Northern Territory
Party	Candidate	Votes	%	±%
Labor	Jock Nelson	3,213	64.1	+19.8
Country	Ralph Edwards	1,085	21.6	+21.6
Independent	Jessie Litchfield	717	14.3	+14.3
Total formal votes		5,015	98.1	
Informal votes		95	1.9	
Turnout		5,110	78.4	
Two-party-preferred result
Labor	Jock Nelson		71.3	+18.6
Country	Ralph Edwards		28.7	+28.7
Labor hold		Swing	+18.6	

=== Elections in the 1940s ===
==== 1949 ====
1949 Australian federal election: Northern Territory
Party	Candidate	Votes	%	±%
Labor	Jock Nelson	2,303	44.3	+21.9
Independent	Adair Blain	1,932	37.2	−5.2
Ind. (Non-Socialist) Labor	Victor Webster	961	18.5	+18.5
Total formal votes		5,196	97.7	
Informal votes		122	2.3	
Turnout		5,318	80.7	
Two-party-preferred result
Labor	Jock Nelson	2,737	52.7	+52.7
Independent	Adair Blain	2,459	47.3	−8.6
Labor gain from Independent		Swing	+8.6	

==== 1946 ====
1946 Australian federal election: Northern Territory
Party	Candidate	Votes	%	±%
Independent	Adair Blain	1,281	42.4	+6.9
Independent Labor	Leigh Wallman	924	30.6	+30.6
Labor	Bob Murray	677	22.4	−5.8
Independent	Ralph Edwards	141	4.7	+4.7
Total formal votes		3,023	99.0	
Informal votes		30	1.0	
Turnout		3,053	73.3	
Two-party-preferred result
Independent	Adair Blain	1,690	55.9	+3.3
Independent Labor	Leigh Wallman	1,333	44.1	+44.1
Independent hold		Swing	+3.3	

==== 1943 ====
1943 Australian federal election: Northern Territory
Party	Candidate	Votes	%	±%
Independent	Adair Blain	859	35.5	−3.4
Independent Labor	Bob Murray	682	28.2	−3.4
Independent Labor	Jock Nelson	602	24.9	+24.9
Independent	Sydney Barker	99	4.1	+4.1
Independent	Hector Fuller	99	4.1	+4.1
Independent	Alexander Grant	43	1.8	+1.8
One Parliament	Harry Russell	36	1.5	+1.5
Total formal votes		2,420	97.7	
Informal votes		58	2.3	
Turnout		2,478	59.1	
Two-party-preferred result
Independent	Adair Blain	1,274	52.6	−9.2
Independent Labor	Bob Murray	1,146	47.4	+9.2
Independent hold		Swing	−9.6	

==== 1940 ====
1940 Australian federal election: Northern Territory
Party	Candidate	Votes	%	±%
Independent	Adair Blain	1,622	38.9	+0.7
Labor	Lindsay Craig	1,321	31.6	−4.9
Independent	Fred Colson	841	20.1	+20.1
Independent Labor	John McDonald	391	9.4	+9.4
Total formal votes		4,175	97.9	
Informal votes		88	2.1	
Turnout		4,263	74.3	
Two-party-preferred result
Independent	Adair Blain	2,579	61.8	+9.8
Labor	Lindsay Craig	1,596	38.2	−9.8
Independent hold		Swing	+9.8	

=== Elections in the 1930s ===
==== 1937 ====
1937 Australian federal election: Northern Territory
Party	Candidate	Votes	%	±%
Independent	Adair Blain	963	38.2	−11.6
Labor	Robert Toupein	920	36.5	−9.2
Independent	Ronald Hughes-Jones	333	13.2	+13.2
Independent	Harold Nelson	305	12.1	+12.1
Total formal votes		2,521	98.8	
Informal votes		32	1.2	
Turnout		2,553	80.1	
Two-party-preferred result
Independent	Adair Blain	1,310	52.0	+0.2
Labor	Robert Toupein	1,211	48.0	−0.2
Independent hold		Swing	+0.2	

==== 1934 ====
1934 Australian federal election: Northern Territory
Party	Candidate	Votes	%	±%
Independent	Adair Blain	926	49.8	+49.8
Labor	Harold Nelson	850	45.7	−4.7
Communist	Charles Priest	85	4.6	+4.6
Total formal votes		1,861	98.1	
Informal votes		37	1.9	
Turnout		1,898	78.8	
Two-party-preferred result
Independent	Adair Blain	964	51.8	+51.8
Labor	Harold Nelson	897	48.2	−7.5
Independent gain from Labor		Swing	+7.5	

==== 1931 ====
1931 Australian federal election: Northern Territory
Party	Candidate	Votes	%	±%
Labor	Harold Nelson	747	50.4	−49.6
Independent	William Easton	577	39.0	+39.0
Independent Labor	John McMillan	157	10.6	+10.6
Total formal votes		1,481	97.6	
Informal votes		37	2.4	
Turnout		1,518	67.7	
Two-party-preferred result
Labor	Harold Nelson		55.7	−44.3
Independent	William Easton		44.3	+44.3
Labor hold		Swing	−44.3	

=== Elections in the 1920s ===
==== 1929 ====
1929 Australian federal election: Northern Territory
Party	Candidate	Votes	%	±%
Labor	Harold Nelson	unopposed		
Labor hold		Swing		

==== 1928 ====
1928 Australian federal election: Northern Territory
Party	Candidate	Votes	%	±%
Labor	Harold Nelson	902	68.1	+5.7
Independent	Douglas Watts	250	18.9	+18.9
Independent Labor	Arthur Love	173	13.1	+13.1
Total formal votes		1,325	96.7	
Informal votes		45	3.3	
Turnout		1,370	65.3	
Two-party-preferred result
Labor	Harold Nelson		75.2	+12.8
Independent	Douglas Watts		24.8	+24.8
Labor hold		Swing	+12.8	

==== 1925 ====
1925 Australian federal election: Northern Territory
Party	Candidate	Votes	%	±%
Labor	Harold Nelson	853	62.4	+25.0
Nationalist	Charles Story	513	37.6	+37.6
Total formal votes		1,366	98.2	
Informal votes		25	1.8	
Turnout		1,391	79.1	
Labor hold		Swing	+12.0	

==== 1922 ====
1922 Australian federal election: Northern Territory
Party	Candidate	Votes	%	±%
Labor	Harold Nelson	452	37.4	+37.4
NT Representation League	Arthur Love	362	30.0	+30.0
Independent	Walter Young	218	18.1	+18.1
Independent	George Stevens	127	10.5	+10.5
Independent	William Byrne	43	3.6	+3.6
Independent	Frederick Thompson	5	0.4	+0.4
Total formal votes		1,207	96.9	
Informal votes		38	3.1	
Turnout		1,245	90.5	
Two-party-preferred result
Labor	Harold Nelson	608	50.4	+50.4
NT Representation League	Arthur Love	599	49.6	+49.6
Labor win		(new seat)		
