= Jeannie Gilruth =

New Zealand Australian philanthropist (1876–1965)

Jeannie Gilruth OBE
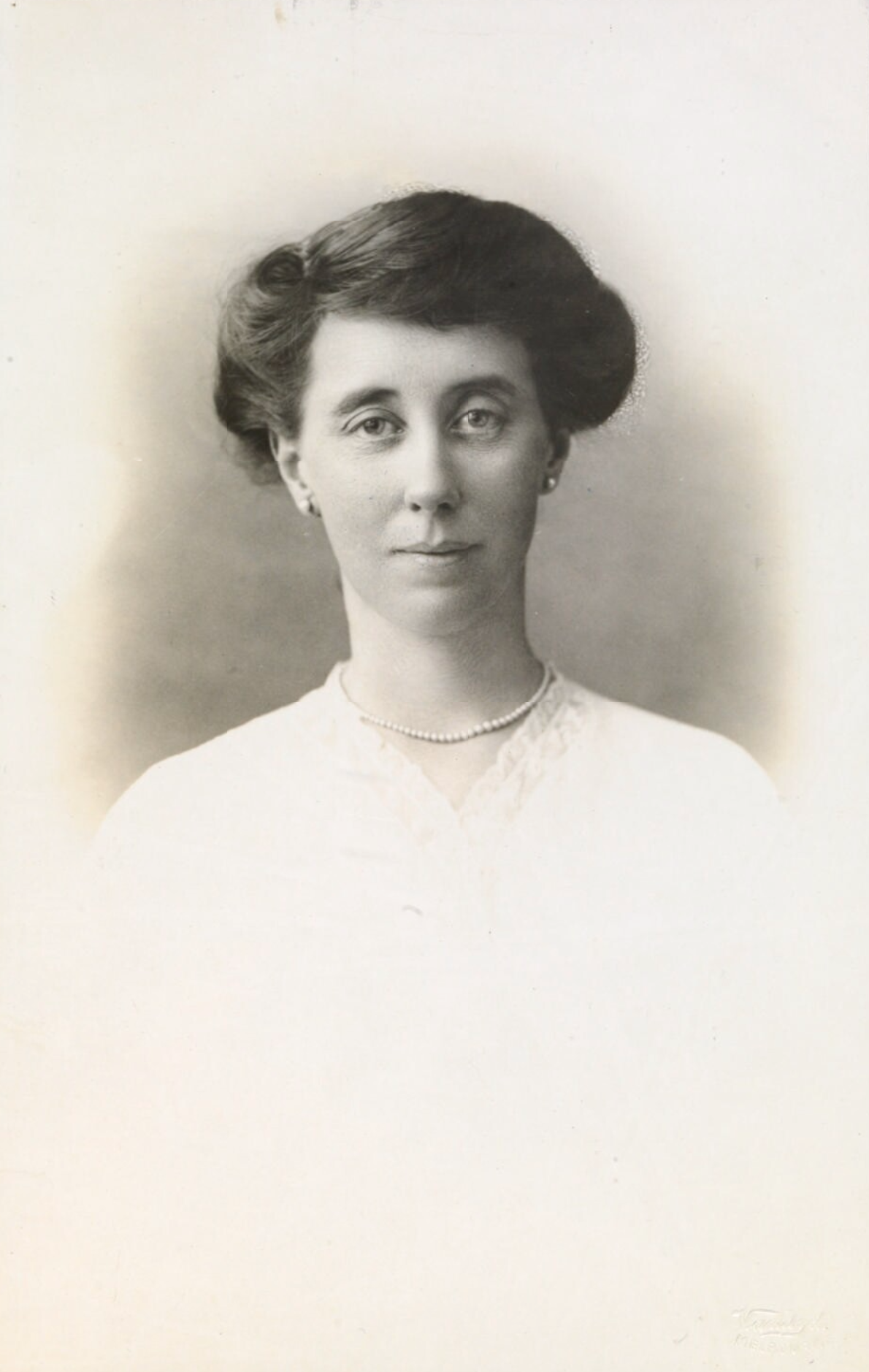
- Born: Jane Margaret McLean McKay; June 1876; Dunedin, Otago, New Zealand
- Died: 11 August 1965 (aged 89); Toorak, Victoria, Australia
- Known for: Founder and inaugural President of the Northern Territory division of the Australian Red Cross

Jeannie Gilruth OBE (born Jane Margaret McLean McKay, June 1876 – 11 August 1965) was a New Zealander, and Australian, who was the founder and president of the Northern Territory division of the Australian Red Cross. She also worked for the Queen Victoria Hospital in Melbourne for 32 years.

== Early life ==
Gilruth, was born Jane Margaret McLean McKay in June 1876 to parents Catherine Barrow and Thomas McLean McKay in Dunedin, New Zealand. She married John Anderson Gilruth in Dunedin, New Zealand on 20 March 1899 They had three children Jean, Margaret, and Ian.

== Career ==
Gilruth convened and presided over the inaugural meeting of the Northern Territory division on 19 May 1915, at Government House in Darwin. It had a large attendance of local residents. As president, Gilruth developed the division and organised the Red Cross services in the Northern Territory.

In 1918 she was made an Officer of the Order of the British Empire for her work with the Red Cross Society.

Gilruth's family moved to Melbourne after the Darwin Rebellion, in which her husband was recalled as administrator of the Northern Territory after an angry mob demanded his resignation.

After moving to Melbourne, Gilruth worked for the Queen Victoria Hospital for 32 years, retiring shortly before her death.

== Death ==
Gilruth died in Toorak, Victoria on 11 August 1965, aged 89.
