= HMAS Una =

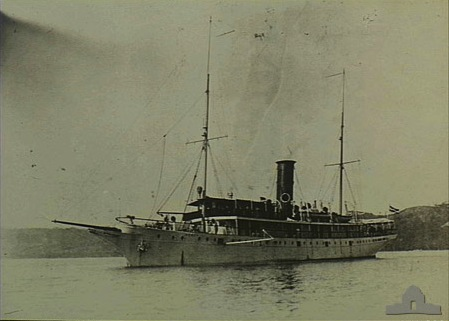
- HMAS Una, 1917

History

Germany
- Name: Komet
- Builder: Bremer Vulkan, Bremen-Vegesack
- Launched: 4 June 1911
- Fate: Captured by ANMEF, 10 October 1914

United Kingdom
- Name: Una
- Commissioned: 17 November 1914
- Decommissioned: 30 June 1920
- Fate: Sold to Pilot Office, 27 January 1925

Australia
- Name: Akuna
- Operator: Port Phillip Pilot Service
- Acquired: 27 January 1925
- In service: 1925
- Out of service: 1953
- Fate: Scrapped, 1955

General characteristics
- Type: Sloop
- Displacement: 977 long tons (993 t)
- Armament: 3 × Mk.VIII 4 in (100 mm) BL guns (as HMAS Una)

HMAS Una was a Royal Australian Navy sloop that began its life as the German motor launch Komet. The ship and her 57 crew was captured by an infantry detachment of the Australian Naval and Military Expeditionary Force led by John Paton on 9 October 1914, with no loss of life. Komet was then sailed to Sydney as a prize.

During the time in which Una was in service under Australia, the sloop was used as a patrol and general purpose vessel. The sloop was used to patrol the areas of New Guinea, New Britain, New Hebrides and Malayan waters.

In December 1918, Una was sent to Darwin to protect Administrator John Gilruth, following the Darwin Rebellion. She arrived on Christmas Eve, anchoring beneath the Government House cliffs until HMAS Encounter arrived in early 1919.

After World War I, Una was decommissioned and taken to Port Phillip Bay, renamed Akuna and used as a pilot vessel. She was finally broken up in Melbourne in 1955.
