= Harriet Douglas Daly =

Australian journalist and author (c. 1854–1927)

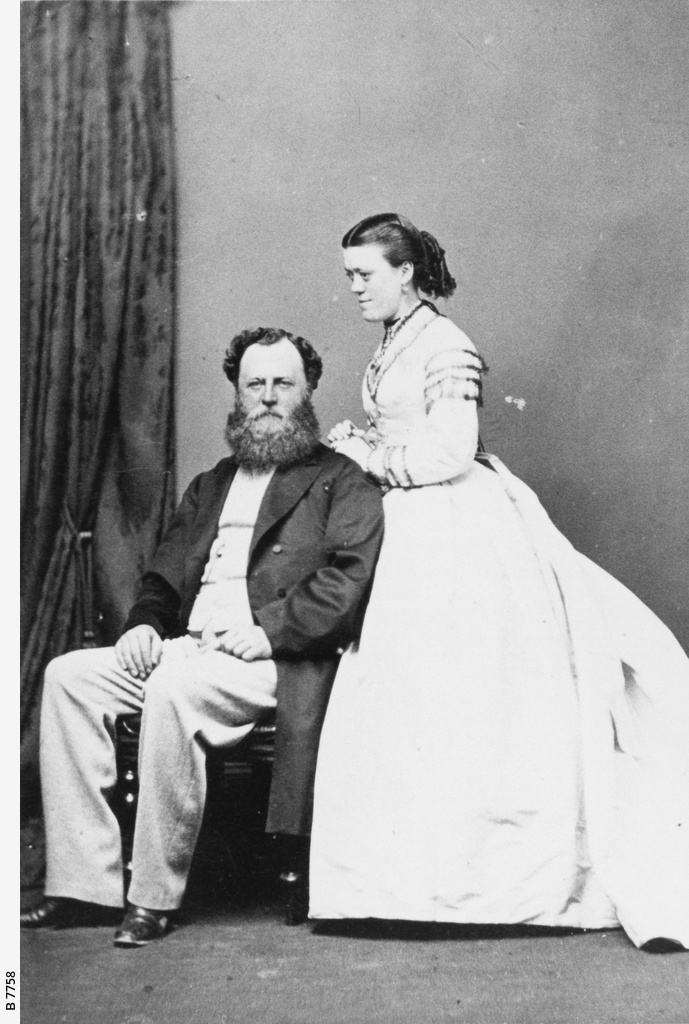
Mr Dominick Daniel and Mrs Harriet Douglas Daly, c. 1875

Harriet Douglas Daly (c. 1854 – 25 August 1927) was an Australian author and journalist who wrote about the Northern Territory and as a London correspondent for The Sydney Morning Herald.

== Early life ==
Daly was the eldest daughter of Ellen and William Bloomfield Douglas and, as a part of her father's role as a merchant marine officer, she travelled extensively in her early life. In 1854, her father first visited South Australia where he decided to settle the family and subsequently held a series of senior administrative posts in the colony.

== Life in the Northern Territory ==
In 1870, her father was appointed as the first Government Resident of the Northern Territory and Daly and the rest of the family moved with him to Palmerston (what is now known as Darwin); this included seven children (five daughters and two sons). Daly was 16 years old and expressed some regrets to the move as she did not want to leave her friends for such an isolated place. The family lived together at the newly constructed Government House, Darwin and it was then known as 'The Residency'; they were its first inhabitants.

Very soon after her arrival in Palmerston, on board the 'Gulnare', Daly met Dominick Daniel Daly, the nephew of the Governor of South Australia Dominick Daly, who arrived the same day on board the 'Bengal'. Before they met Dominick had been working as a Surveyor with GG McLachlans's No. 6 part with Goyder's Expedition of 1869. The pair married in Adelaide on 23 October 1871 and, soon after, returned to Darwin where Dominick worked for the Engineer-in-Chief.

In Darwin, Daly recorded her and her families experience and the history of the settlement in her book Digging, squatting and pioneering life in the Northern Territory of South Australia (1887). Daly researched this book using newspaper articles and official reports and she received a favourable review from The Observer (Adelaide) who noted its 'considerable humour' and 'pleasant style'.

In Darwin, Daly was one of the few women who held Miner's Rights and she was known to go on excursions on horseback and wrote of this time:

There was a sense of boundless freedom in the country, and a curious feeling that, ride as far as one liked, one could meet no strange face, or make any fresh acquaintances. We had the whole of this great tract of country entirely to ourselves. In time we knew every tree, and almost every path by heart during our long jungle rides.

— Harriet Douglas Daly, Digging, Squatting, and Pioneering Life, Chapter IV, Camp Life, p. 62

Daly also wrote about her meetings with and interactions with Larrakia people including Nilunga, a Larrakia 'King'.

Daly left Darwin in 1873 following the dismissal of her father from his role as Government Resident.

== Later life ==
After leaving the Northern Territory, Daly and her husband later moved to the Malay States where Dominick died in Borneo, while working for the British North Borneo Company, in 1889.

Following his death, Daly moved to London where she wrote a column for the Sydney Morning Herald for more than 25 years and often wrote under the name Mrs Dominic Daly. This column was first entitled 'A Lady's Letter from London' and later 'A Woman's Letter from London. She was known for helping other journalists and having a particular interest in the theatre.

She died in London on 28 August 1927.

== Publications ==
Daly, Harriet Douglas (1887). Digging, squatting and pioneering life in the Northern Territory of South Australia (PDF Copy). Sampson, Low, Marston, Searle and Rivington, London.
