= Forest Creek Monster Meeting =

Rally during the gold rush in Victoria

Recreation of the original Monster Meeting flag raised in 1851 at Forest Creek

The Forest Creek Monster Meeting was an organised protest at Forest Creek in Victoria, Australia against the increase in miner's licence fee planned by the colonial government of Victoria. Although it was one of several similar protests held around the colony, it is notable as the largest known mass rally held during the Australian gold rushes.

In December 1851 the government announced that it intended to triple the licence fee from £1 to £3 a month, from 1 January 1852.

On 15 December 1851, between 14,000 and 20,000 miners gathered for the first mass meeting of diggers, as the miners were known, at Forest Creek. The notices put about the diggings by a person who called himself "A Digger" in advance of the meeting advertised it as a 'Monster Meeting'. The Miners' Flag, also known as the standard of Australian reform, flew at this meeting for the first time. The exact design of this flag is unknown.

== Site rediscovery ==
The meeting took place at the site of a shepherd's hut, an outstation of William Campbell's sheep run 'Strathloddon" which was built around 5 km south of Major Thomas Mitchell's line of road at the junction of Wattle and Forest Creeks in the 1840s. It was claimed at the time that between 12 and 20 thousand people attended the meeting that day, a far greater number than any meeting of gold diggers before or since. The site of the shepherd's hut was rediscovered after research by Glenn Braybrook and his father Ian Braybrook local historians in 2002.

Asked by the late Doug Ralph to find the site so to end any argument in the community about the exact site as there were several sites various people thought where the meeting had taken place.-Doug himself believed the Monster Meeting took place at the top of old Post office hill, near where the old Chewton tip was located and says that in his 1995 re enactment booklet-if anybody knew where the site was they surely would have told Doug and Glenn on their quest to find the correct location, they didn't despite articles written in the local papers and newsletters asking for help in locating the site.. Glenn had an article printed on the front page of the Chewton Chat, a local newsletter asking for information from the community about the correct site. A few months passed when Glenn enlisted the help of his father, Ian Braybrook, who accompanied Glenn to the area where he thought the monster meeting site was. Armed with a Survey Map given to them by John Ellis that was given to him by the late Barbra James and other historical maps and a tape measure that afternoon they found the site again. Although some said it was in another place to the South behind the Mount Alexander hotel, and others had thought the site was to the North, Glenn and Ian proved that afternoon that they had found the spot. Barbra James had drawn a map which is placed on an information board near the East entrance of Chewton depicting the site being on the East side of Golden point road, which is where she thought the meeting had taken place one of a few different sites thought to be where the meeting was held. The Shepherds hut site where the Monster Meeting was held was confirmed by the Victorian geological survey which confirmed the Braybrooks combined evidence. By looking at the drawings completed in 1851 by David Tulloch who attended the Monster Meeting, they found and stood on the exact site of the old shepherds hut, where the Monster Meeting of Diggers was held.

== Legacy ==
The site is now marked with a cairn placed below the original spot by members of the Ballarat Reform League. Locals gather annually to commemorate the event.

== See also ==
- Darwin Rebellion
- Bendigo Petition
- Eureka Rebellion
