= John Paton (general) =

Australian merchant and army officer

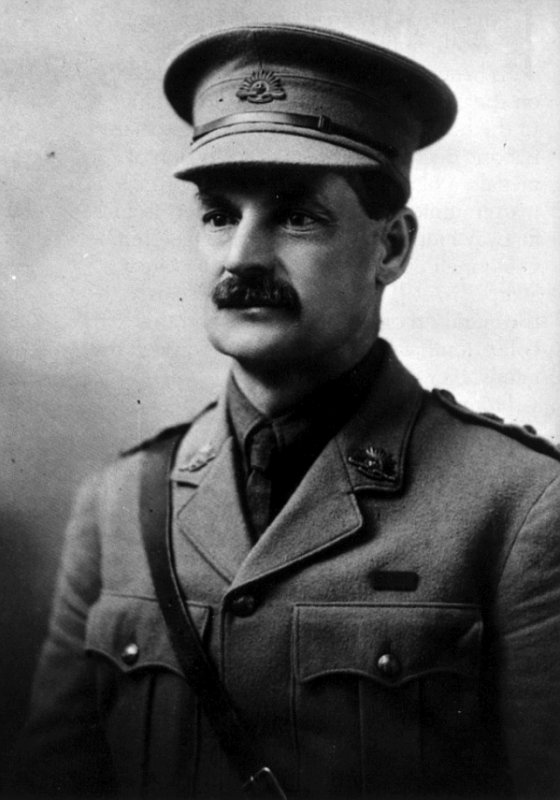
- Colonel John Paton c. 1914–15
- Born: 18 November 1867; Newcastle, New South Wales
- Died: 21 November 1943 (aged 76); Newcastle, New South Wales
- Military career
- Allegiance: Australia
- Branch: New South Wales Military Forces; Citizens Military Force
- Service years: 1887–1926
- Rank: Major General
- Commands: 2nd Division (c.1924–26); 6th Brigade (1917–18); 17th Brigade (1917); 7th Brigade (1916); 25th Battalion (1915); Newcastle Defended Port (1914); 4th Infantry Brigade (1914)
- Conflicts: First World War; Asian and Pacific theatre; Gallipoli Campaign; Western Front; Battle of Pozières; Battle of Broodseinde; Battle of Hamel
- Awards: Companion of the Order of the Bath; Companion of the Order of St Michael and St George; Colonial Auxiliary Forces Officers' Decoration; Mentioned in Despatches (3); Order of Saint Stanislaus, 2nd Class (Russia)
- Other work: Vice President of the Newcastle Chamber of Commerce

Major General John Gibson Paton, CB, CMG, VD (18 November 1867 – 21 November 1943) was an Australian merchant and army officer who served in the First World War.

== Early life and merchant career ==
Paton was born in Newcastle, New South Wales and joined the New South Wales Military Forces in December 1887 as a second lieutenant in the 4th Infantry. Paton steadily rose through the ranks and at the outbreak of the First World War was appointed to command the Newcastle Defended Port. His first action was as second in command of the Australian Naval and Military Expeditionary Force under William Holmes. During the operation, Paton captured the German motor launch Komet which later became HMAS Una.

== First World War ==
Paton joined the Australian Imperial Force on 16 March 1915 as a lieutenant colonel commanding the 25th Battalion, part of the 7th Infantry Brigade, which embarked for Egypt on 2 June 1915 where it trained until it embarked for Gallipoli on 28 August 1915. Paton took over the 7th Brigade on 15 October 1915 on direct orders from Major General James Gordon Legge. During the evacuation of Anzac, Paton was placed in command of the Rear Party, and at 0410 on 20 December Paton embarked on the last boat to leave Anzac.

Paton arrived in France on 19 March 1916 and commanded several brigades during his tour on the Western Front. On 5 November, while directing an attack on a trench known as "The Maze", Paton was wounded by a German sniper and evacuated to England. On 24 August 1918 following frustration at being passed over for divisional command multiple times, Paton elected to retire and returned to Australia.

== Post-war career and retirement ==
Following the war Paton returned to business as manager of R. Hall & Son, and was vice president of the Newcastle Chamber of Commerce from 1919 to 1920, president from 1920 to 1923, and vice president again from 1929 to 1931. Paton returned to service after the war and commanded the 5th and 1st Brigades, and then the 2nd Division, retiring in 1926 with the rank of major general. He died on 21 November 1943 and was cremated.

== See also ==
- List of Australian generals
