= Daphne Campbell (actress) =

Australian actress

Ald Daphne Calder

Alderman of Alice Springs
- In office 28 May 1988 – 2 May 1989
- Succeeded by: Carole Frost

Personal details
- Born: Daphne Campbell; 5 January 1924 Orange, New South Wales
- Died: 15 October 2013 (aged 89)

Daphne Campbell, signed picture from 1947

Daphne Calder (née Campbell; 5 January 1924 – 15 October 2013) was an Australian politician, actress and controversial entrant in the 1947 Miss Australia charity quest.

== History ==
Campbell was born in Orange, New South Wales, the eldest child of orchardist Vic Campbell, and worked with a cosmetics firm in Orange before enlisting with AAMWS at age 18.

She was a corporal stationed in Cairns with AAMWS when "discovered" by director Harry Watt for the role of Mary Parsons in the all-Australian cast for the British Ealing Studios film The Overlanders. She had been persuaded to audition by a friend when in Sydney, and was chosen for her simple good looks and easy manner. She was also an expert horsewoman. While on the set, Campbell met Stephen "Sam" Calder DFC, who had been an RAAF Typhoon pilot during the war, and had recently been taken on as a commercial pilot by Connellan Airways. They married in August 1945 and had a home in Alice Springs. Sam would later have a career in politics as MHR for the Northern Territory 1966–1980.

In August 1947 Campbell was approached by an organising committee from the Alice Springs sub-branch of the Returned Servicemen's League to represent the Northern Territory in the Miss South Australia Quest, preparatory to the Miss Australia Quest. The purpose behind the Quest was fund-raising for the RSL and for the Kindergarten Union, and Campbell was enthusiastic about these causes. An interstate protest was made against her candidature was made on the grounds of her being a married woman, but denied on the grounds of her nomination having been accepted before the rule had been instituted. A fair number of special fund-raising activities were held in the Territory in support of her campaign, including a rodeo and an Australian Rules football match, and Campbell worked as hard as anyone but support was lacking from people who could best afford it, and a spoiling campaign developed on the grounds that she wasn't a "true Territorian", with the result that her funds raised barely exceeded £800 when expectations had been for considerably more. Campbell was adjudged Miss South Australia 1947. Her eligibility for inclusion in the Miss Australia judging, on the basis of her marital status, was also questioned.

Campbell never made another film or entered another charity quest.

In 1988, Campbell was elected as to Alice Springs Town Council. Her time as an alderman was brief, resigning in May 1989 just under a year after being elected.

== Personal ==
The Calders had two daughters, Erika (born September 1946) and Diana (born 5 January 1949).
