= John Reeves (judge) =

Australian politician (born 1952)

The Honourable John Reeves QC
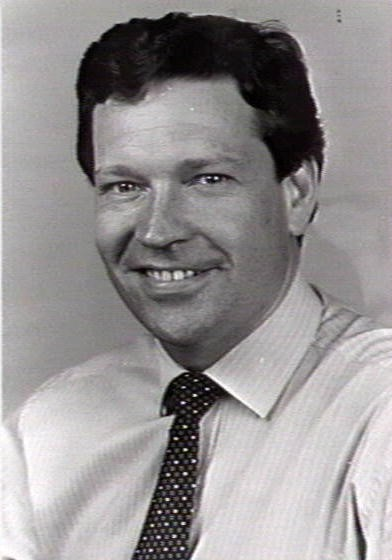

Judge of the Federal Court of Australia
- In office 19 November 2007 – 1 January 2022

Member of the Australian Parliament for Northern Territory
- In office 5 March 1983 – 1 December 1984
- Preceded by: Grant Tambling
- Succeeded by: Paul Everingham

Personal details
- Born: 2 January 1952 (age 74) Stanthorpe, Queensland, Australia
- Party: Australian Labor Party
- Occupation: Federal Court Justice

John Edward Reeves QC (born 2 January 1952) is a former Australian politician, lawyer and judge. He was a Labor member of the Australian House of Representatives from 1983 to 1984, a prominent barrister in Darwin afterwards, the author of the controversial 1999 Reeves Report on Aboriginal land rights in Australia. He served as a Judge of the Federal Court of Australia from November 2007 to January 2022.

From 2007 to 2012 (until the appointment of Duncan Kerr), he was the only former politician serving on the Federal Court, and the only former politician serving on an Australian appellate court.

== Political career ==
Reeves was born in Stanthorpe, Queensland, and was admitted as a solicitor in 1975 after completing five years articles of clerkship and the Queensland Solicitors Admission Course. He moved to Alice Springs, where he worked as a solicitor, and became involved with the Labor Party. He won preselection to contest the Northern Territory seat in the House of Representatives for the 1983 federal election. He was elected amidst the election of the Hawke government, ending a 17-year hold on the seat by the Coalition (the Country Party until 1974, and the Country Liberal Party afterward).

Another federal election was held the following year, however, and Reeves faced a strong challenge when the Chief Minister of the Northern Territory, Paul Everingham, resigned to challenge Reeves. Initially thought to have little chance against the popular Everingham, he closed the gap in the polls significantly during the campaign. Ultimately, he was defeated on the fourth count, losing by 1,800 votes.

Reeves had moved to Darwin upon his election to parliament, and returned to his legal practice there after his 1984 defeat, being admitted to the bar the following year. He remained involved in the Labor Party, where he was heavily associated with the party's right-wing faction, and initially was a staunch ally of Opposition Leader Bob Collins. Reeves subsequently nominated and won the presidency of the Northern Territory branch of the ALP in 1985 over concerted opposition from the party's left wing. Though he remained ideologically aligned with Collins during his term as party president, Reeves announced in 1986 that he intended to run for the Northern Territory Legislative Assembly at the 1987 territory election, in a move that was widely seen as a prelude to a leadership challenge against Collins. He lost preselection for the highly marginal CLP seat of Jingili, and was forced to contest the less marginal seat of Casuarina, which he went on to lose to incumbent MLA Nick Dondas.

Reeves' influence within the ALP began to wane significantly after 1987. A left-wing candidate, Warren Snowdon, won preselection for the federal seat for the 1987 federal election. Reeves strongly criticised Snowdon, stating that his victory was an "aberration" and urging the party not to shift to the left. Snowdon's supporters moved to gain control of the NT branch at the 1987 party conference, ousting both Reeves as party president and his ally Collins as delegate to the party's National Executive. Reeves attempted to make a political comeback at the 1990 territory election, but lost preselection for Casuarina and did not run for public office again.

== Legal career and the Reeves Report ==
Reeves developed a significant legal practice as a barrister in Darwin in the 1990s, and became increasingly distant from the Labor Party. In 1996, after his former rival Nick Dondas defeated Snowdon for the Northern Territory seat, he represented Dondas against a Court of Disputed Returns challenge by Snowdon. He was a close friend of Shane Stone, the CLP Chief Minister from 1995, and was appointed as a Queens Counsel by Stone in 1997.

In 1997, Liberal Prime Minister John Howard announced an inquiry into the Aboriginal Land Rights Act 1976. Reeves, known to be the CLP's preferred appointee, was tipped the head the inquiry, and was duly appointed in October 1997. The appointment was criticised by Aboriginal groups both for his lack of judicial experience and his history of defending developers accused of desecrating Aboriginal sacred sites. The Reeves Report (full title The Aboriginal Land Rights Act (Northern Territory) 1976, Building on Land Rights for the Next Generation ), was released in August 1998, and advocated sweeping changes to land rights legislation, including the scrapping of permits for access to Aboriginal land, granting the Northern Territory Government compulsory acquisition powers over Aboriginal land, and scrapping the Aboriginal land councils in favour of a new body. It notably did not, however, recommend the abolition of the right for Aboriginal communities to veto proposed mining projects on their land, a change that the mining industry had been heavily lobbying for.

The report was strongly opposed in Aboriginal communities across the territory at public hearings, with a copy of the report being publicly burned at Yuendumu and prominent Aboriginal leaders, including Galarrwuy Yunupingu and Alison Anderson, attacking the report in the media. It also received a lukewarm response in federal parliament, despite strong support from the Stone territory government; it was vigorously opposed by a number of prominent former Liberal politicians, including Malcolm Fraser, Ian Viner, Ian Wilson, Peter Baume, and Fred Chaney. A cross-party parliamentary committee in the House of Representatives unanimously declined to adopt the report's recommendations; it was also rejected by the corresponding committee in the Senate. None of its recommendations were enacted into law in the aftermath, but some were revived a decade later by the Howard government as part of the Northern Territory National Emergency Response.

== Appointment as a Judge of the Federal Court ==
Reeves remained a prominent figure in the Northern Territory legal community, serving as President of the Northern Territory Bar Association from 2000 to 2005 and vice-president of the Australian Bar Association from 2003 to 2004. He also served as Deputy Chair of the Legal Practitioner's Complaints Committee, and as Chairman of the Northern Territory division of the Australian Red Cross. He was also appointed to the taskforce of the Northern Territory National Emergency Response in 2007.

Reeves was appointed to the Federal Court of Australia in November 2007, as one of the last judicial appointments of the Howard government. He was the first judge to be specifically based in Darwin, which had previously been served by interstate judges in an acting capacity. In March 2009, however, he was transferred to Brisbane, following concerns that the judicial workload in Darwin was not sufficient to warrant a resident judge, and a number of cases from which he had to withdraw due to potential conflicts of interest with his past legal work as a barrister.

Reeves is one of only six politicians to have served in both the Parliament of Australia and the Federal Court of Australia, alongside Nigel Bowen, Robert Ellicott, Merv Everett, Tony Whitlam and Duncan Kerr.

His notable decisions include (in no particular order); Stoddart v Boulton [2009] FCA 1108 regarding spousal privilege at common law in Australia and QGC Pty Limited v Bygrave [2011] FCA 1457 dealing with the role and registration of Indigenous Land Use Agreements. Reeves was also the docket Judge for the Australian Securities and Investment Commission's litigation in 2011–12 against the collapsed Storm Financial Ltd. The litigation also involved the Commonwealth Bank, Macquarie Bank and the Bank of Queensland.

On 1 May 2009 Justice Reeves was appointed as an Additional Judge of the Supreme Court of the Northern Territory. Justice Reeves travelled to both Darwin and Alice Springs in this capacity.

Reeves retired from the Federal Court on 1 January 2022.

== See also ==
- List of Judges of the Federal Court of Australia

Parliament of Australia
Preceded by Grant Tambling	Member for Northern Territory; 1983–1984	Succeeded by Paul Everingham
