= Bendigo Petition =

The Bendigo Petition was an attempt by miners in the colony of Victoria (now part of the Commonwealth of Australia) to demand reasonable limits to taxation and improved access to land from Governor La Trobe, a representative of the British Government. In particular the miners requested reform of license fees applicable to miners on the gold fields. The Bendigo Petition built on the earlier demands enunciated by miners at the Forest Creek Monster Meeting of 1851.

The Anti-Gold Licence Association was formed by G E Thomson, Dr Jones and Edward Brown at Bendigo on 6 June 1853.

The petitions demands included:

1. To direct that the License Fee be reduced to 10 Shillings a Month.
2. To direct that Monthly or Quarterly Licenses be issued at the option of the applicants.
3. To direct that new arrivals or invalids be allowed on registering their names at the Commissioners Office fifteen clear days residence on the Goldfields before the license be enforced.
4. To afford greater facility to Diggers and others resident on the Goldfields who wish to engage in Agricultural Pursuits for investing their earnings in small allotments of land.
5. To direct that the Penalty of Five Pounds for no possession of License be reduced to One pound.
6. To direct that the sending of an Armed Force to enforce the License Tax be discontinued.

Most of the petition's demands, including the reduction in the licence fee, were rejected.
