= Grant Tambling =

Australian politician (1943–2025)

Grant Tambling AM
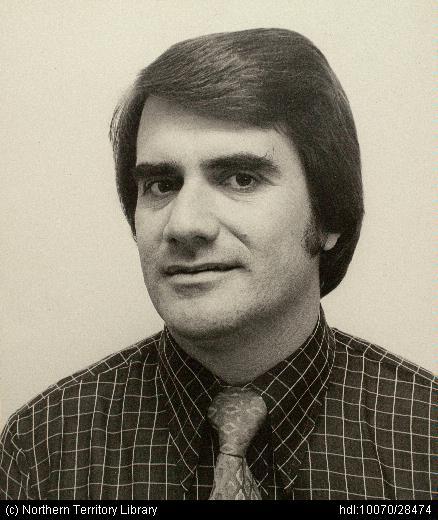

Member of the Australian Parliament for Northern Territory
- In office 18 October 1980 – 5 March 1983
- Preceded by: Sam Calder
- Succeeded by: John Reeves

Senator for Northern Territory
- In office 11 July 1987 – 9 November 2001
- Preceded by: Bernie Kilgariff
- Succeeded by: Nigel Scullion

Administrator of Norfolk Island
- In office 1 November 2003 – 7 August 2007
- Monarch: Elizabeth II
- Governor-General: Michael Jeffery
- Preceded by: Michael Stephens
- Succeeded by: Owen Walsh

Personal details
- Born: 20 June 1943 Wondai, Queensland, Australia
- Died: 24 January 2025 (aged 81)
- Party: Country Liberal Party (1974−2003; 2007–2025) (Note: Tambling was required to resign his party membership from 2003−2007 when he was Administrator of Norfolk Island.); National Party (federal)
- Spouse: Sandy Tambling

Grant Ernest John Tambling, AM (20 June 1943 – 24 January 2025) was an Australian politician. He was a member of the House of Representatives from 1980 to 1983 and then a Senator for the Northern Territory from 1987 to 2001, representing the Country Liberal Party. In federal parliament, he sat with the National Country Party, later renamed National Party. He later served as Administrator of Norfolk Island from 2003 to 2007.

Prior to his career in federal politics, he had a career in territory politics including a stint as Deputy Majority Leader between 1975 and 1977.

== Early life ==
Tambling was born in Wondai, Queensland and raised in Darwin in the Northern Territory. He attended Darwin High School and Adelaide Boys' High School, returning to Darwin before moving to Sydney for work.

== Politics ==
Northern Territory Legislative Assembly
Years	Term	Electoral division	Party
1974–1977	1st	Fannie Bay	Country Liberal

After a stint in local government on the Darwin City Council, Tambling was elected to the first Northern Territory Legislative Assembly as the Country Liberal Party member for Fannie Bay. Tambling served as Executive Member for Community Development in that first parliament. Executive members were the equivalent of ministers in later years, though that title was not used until self-government was granted in 1978.

In 1975, he became deputy leader of the CLP and hence Deputy Majority Leader (deputy premier) under Majority Leader Goff Letts. Despite that, Tambling was defeated at the 1977 election by Labor Party candidate Pam O'Neil, and began a career in business. He served as the member for the Northern Territory electorate in the House of Representatives from 1980 to 1983, but was again defeated by an ALP rival, John Reeves. He sat with the parliamentary National Country Party like his predecessor Sam Calder.

After four years out of parliament, Tambling was once again elected—this time to the Senate—at the 1987 federal election. As a senator, he replaced Bernie Kilgariff, who he had earlier replaced as Deputy Majority leader. Unlike Kilgariff who sat with the Liberal Party, Tambling continued to sit with the parliamentary National Party (since renamed from National Country Party), as he did previously as member for Northern Territory. He is the only Territorian to have served in both houses of federal parliament. He was also the Deputy National Party Leader in the Senate between 10 April 1990 and 23 March 1993, and a second time between 11 May 2000 and 9 November 2001. He also spent almost six years as parliamentary secretary in the Howard government, between 11 March 1996 and 26 November 2001.

Tambling spent fourteen years as a Senator before being disendorsed by the CLP at the 2001 election for voting in favour of anti-Internet gaming legislation. Tambling subsequently retired from politics and worked for two years in private consultancy.

== Norfolk Island ==
Tambling was appointed the Administrator of Norfolk Island, for a term lasting from 1 November 2003 to September 2007.

== Personal life and death ==
Tambling was married with two children. He died on 24 January 2025, at the age of 81.

== Notes ==
Government offices
Preceded by Michael Stephens	Administrator of Norfolk Island; 2003–2007	Succeeded by Owen Walsh
Northern Territory Legislative Assembly
New seat	Member for Fannie Bay; 1974–1977	Succeeded by Pam O'Neil
Parliament of Australia
Preceded by Sam Calder	Member for Northern Territory; 1980–1983	Succeeded by John Reeves
Preceded by Bernie Kilgariff	Senator for the Northern Territory; 1987–2001; Served alongside: Bob Collins, Trish Crossin	Succeeded by Nigel Scullion
