= Henry Ernest Carey =

Administrator of the Northern Territory (1874–1964)

Henry Ernest Carey (11 November 1874 – 5 May 1964) was a British-born Australian public servant, who was the Director of the Northern Territory from 1919 to 1920.

== Life and career ==
Carey was born in Tiverton, Devon, England on 11 November 1874. In 1894, he began working in a clerical position for the General Post Office in Britain. He later moved to New Zealand and spent 7 years working in the Ministry of Agriculture and Fisheries. From 1907, he held various jobs in both the private and public sector, before becoming manager of Northern Agency Pty Ltd.

On 1 August 1919, Carey was appointed Director of the Northern Territory in Australia, a new post that temporarily replaced the position of Administrator. He remained in this role until 22 September 1920, when the Governor-General in Council terminated his contract. Carey claimed unfair dismissal, and attempted to seek compensation, but was unsuccessful in this attempt.

After this, he returned to New Zealand where he worked on the staff of the Taranaki Daily News in New Plymouth. He died in New Plymouth on 5 May 1964.
