= Jock Nelson =

Australian politician

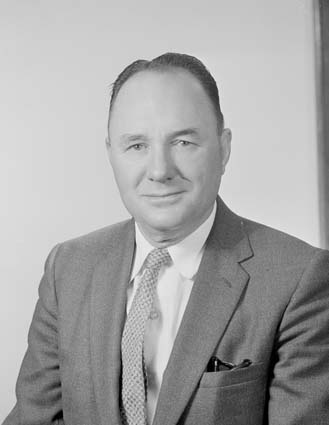

Administrator of the Northern Territory
- In office 10 December 1973 – 12 November 1975
- Preceded by: Fred Chaney Sr.
- Succeeded by: John England

Mayor of Alice Springs
- In office 1 July 1971 – 8 December 1973
- Preceded by: office established
- Succeeded by: Brian Martin

Member of the Australian Parliament for Northern Territory
- In office 10 December 1949 – 31 October 1966
- Preceded by: Adair Blain
- Succeeded by: Sam Calder

Personal details
- Born: John Norman Nelson; 28 May 1908 Bundaberg, Queensland
- Died: 20 June 1991 (aged 83) Alice Springs, Northern Territory
- Party: Labor
- Spouse: Margaret Caroline Nelson (nee Bloomfield)
- Occupation: Pastoralist

John Norman Nelson (28 May 1908 – 20 June 1991) was an Australian politician in the Australian Labor Party. He served in federal government, in the Australian House of Representatives, from 1949 until 1966.

== Early life and education ==
Born in Bundaberg, Queensland on 28 May 1908, John Norman Nelson was the son of politician Harold Nelson, a staunch trade unionist who had held the NT federal seat, first as an independent, and then Labor.

He was educated at state schools in Darwin, Northern Territory.

== Early career ==
Nelson first became a jackeroo and goldminer, and later a bore contractor at Alice Springs, Northern Territory.

After serving in the military during World War II from 1942 to 1945, he became a pastoralist.

== Political career ==
In 1949, he was elected to the Australian House of Representatives as the Labor member for Northern Territory, defeating the sitting independent, Adair Blain. At this time, the member for Northern Territory could only vote on matters relating to the Territory itself.

Nelson was selected to sit on the Parliamentary Select Committee on Aboriginal Voting Rights in 1961, although he had shown no interest in Aboriginal affairs or connections with Aboriginal people. In March 1963, however, he did question the Minister for Territories (Paul Hasluck), about the granting of mining leases to Australian and French interests (the latter being GOMINCO) on the Gove Peninsula in Arnhem Land, the land of the Yolngu people. In this he was supported by Gordon Bryant. However, Hasluck responded that Cecil Gribble (Methodist Overseas Mission secretary) had agreed to the measures being taken, such as extra royalties being paid to the people However, the people of Yirrkala mission were not at all satisfied with the lack of consultation about using their land for mining bauxite, and created the Yirrkala bark petitions to be presented to the Australian Parliament. On 14 August 1963, Nelson presented the first of these petitions to the House of Representatives, which was widely covered by the press. A photograph of him holding up the petition in his office before presenting it appeared in The Canberra Times.

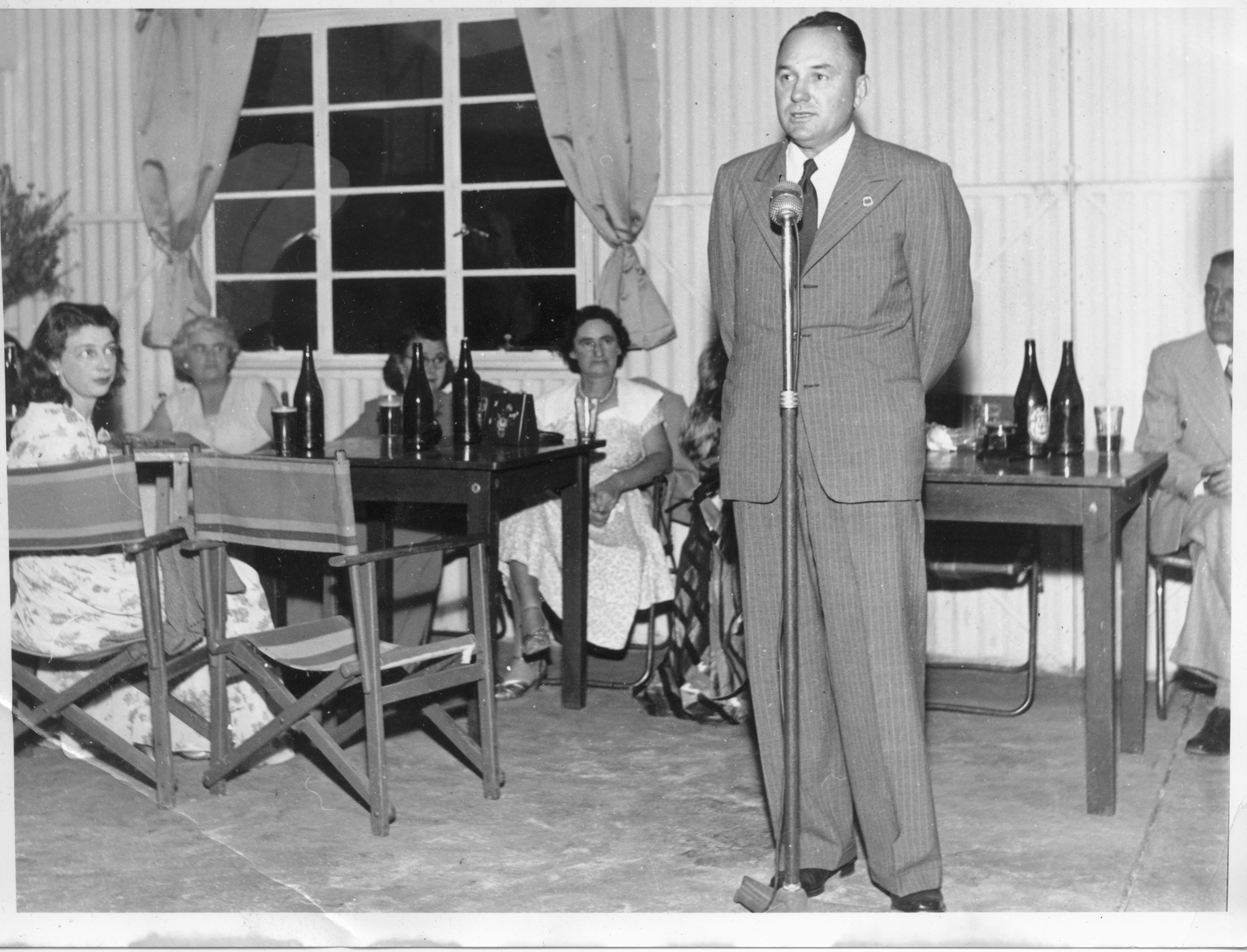
Jock Nelson at Memorial Club, Alice Springs, c. 1960

In the November 1963 federal election, Nelson was re-elected unopposed, the last occasion when a member was returned to the House of Representatives in this fashion. He retired in 1966, an occasion used by the Country Party to take the seat.

== Later life and death ==
Nelson returned to pastoralism and served as the first Mayor of Alice Springs (1971-1973), before he stepped down to become the Administrator of the Northern Territory (1973–1975). He died on 20 June 1991.

A local government building centre in Alice Springs is named after him.

== See also ==
- Darwin Rebellion

Parliament of Australia
Preceded by Adair Blain	Member for Northern Territory; 1949–1966	Succeeded by Sam Calder
Government offices
Preceded by Fred Chaney Sr.	Administrator of the Northern Territory; 1973–1975	Succeeded by John England
