= Harold George Nelson =

Australian politician

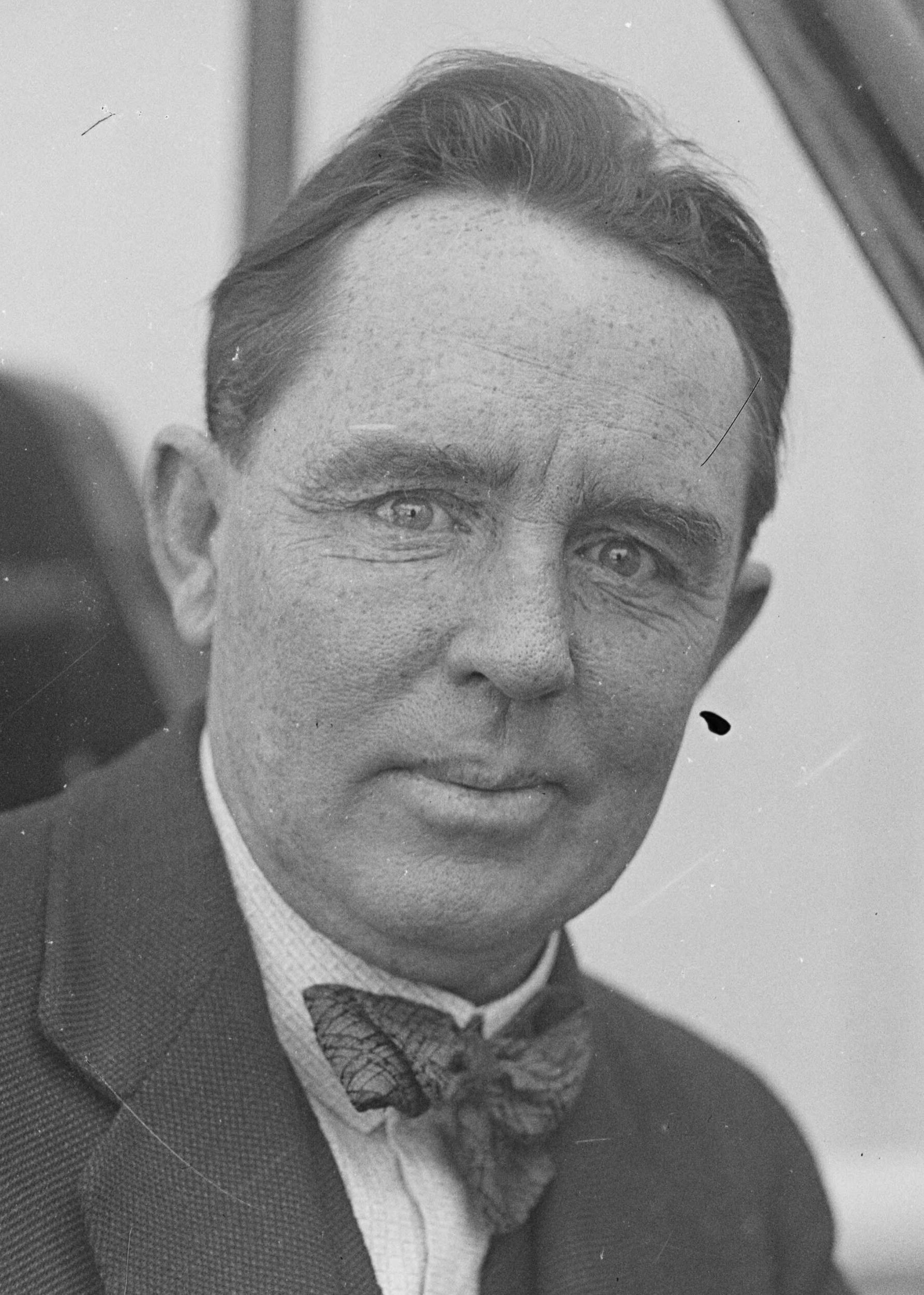

Member of the Australian Parliament for Northern Territory
- In office 16 December 1922 – 15 September 1934
- Preceded by: New seat
- Succeeded by: Adair Blain

Personal details
- Born: 21 December 1881 Botany, New South Wales, Australia
- Died: 26 April 1947 (aged 65) Alice Springs, Northern Territory, Australia
- Party: Labor
- Spouse: Maud Lawrence (m. 1904)
- Children: 5, inc. Jock Nelson
- Occupation: Trade unionist

Harold George "H. G." Nelson (21 December 1881 – 26 April 1947) was an Australian politician and trade unionist who was the first person to represent the Northern Territory in the House of Representatives. He arrived in the territory in 1914 to work as an organiser for the Australian Workers' Union (AWU), and was a leader of the Darwin rebellion of 1918. He subsequently served in the House of Representatives from 1922 to 1934, initially as an independent and then as a member of the Labor Party.

== Early life ==
Nelson was born in Botany, New South Wales, the son of Elizabeth Ann (née Tighe) and John Nelson. His father was a Scottish-born shopkeeper. According to the Australian Dictionary of Biography, "little is known of his early years and nothing of his education". Nelson moved to Queensland as a young man, working as an engine-driver at Gympie and Mount Perry.

== Politics ==
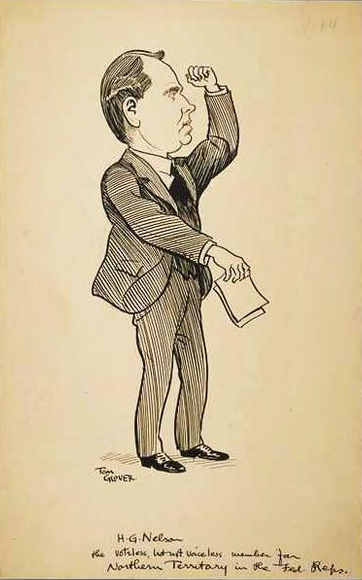
Caricature of Nelson by Thomas Glover, 1923

In 1913, Nelson, his wife Maud, and their five children moved to Pine Creek in the Northern Territory, where he continued to work as an engine driver and began his involvement in union affairs. He became an organiser for the Australian Workers' Union in 1914 and was the first secretary of the AWU's Darwin branch.

The influence of the AWU in the Northern Territory grew in significance and so did that of Nelson. By the end of 1917, 40% of all white men in the Territory belonged to the AWU and Nelson used his standing in the community to gain election to Darwin Town Council.

Described as a "medium-sized nuggety man" and a fiery orator, Nelson was an effective campaigner, as can be seen by his successful campaign to significantly raise the wages of Darwin meat workers in 1917. He also led protests against the Northern Territory Administrator Dr John A. Gilruth, which officially originated in November 1918 when Gilruth refused requests from barmaids for time off to celebrate the end of World War I (although tensions had been simmering between Gilruth and the union movement for some time). On 17 December 1918, in what has since been called the Darwin Rebellion, Nelson led a protest march to Liberty Square, in front of Government House, to demand Gilruth's removal as Administrator. Continued protests eventually led to the removal of Dr Gilruth from the Administrator position in February 1919, followed by the departure of other senior officials soon after.

During that time, he had a tendency towards an anarchist outlook, once insisting on the reformation of the AWU's Darwin branch to adopt the "One Big Union" principle. That organization later became the North Australian Workers' Union, but Nelson ultimately abandoned the idea.

He then turned his attention to campaigning for Northern Territory representation in the Australian parliament, including refusing to pay taxes in an echo of the American War of Independence cry of "no taxation without representation". After a brief gaol stint, Nelson's campaign resulted in the establishment of a Northern Territory-based seat (albeit non-voting) in the House of Representatives.

After standing down as AWU secretary, Nelson successfully stood for the new seat as an independent at the 1922 election, although he joined the Australian Labor Party soon after.

Nelson spent his time in parliament campaigning for greater expenditure and self-government for the Northern Territory, with little success. Following his defeat at the 1934 election, Nelson moved to Alice Springs to work as an agent.

== Personal life ==
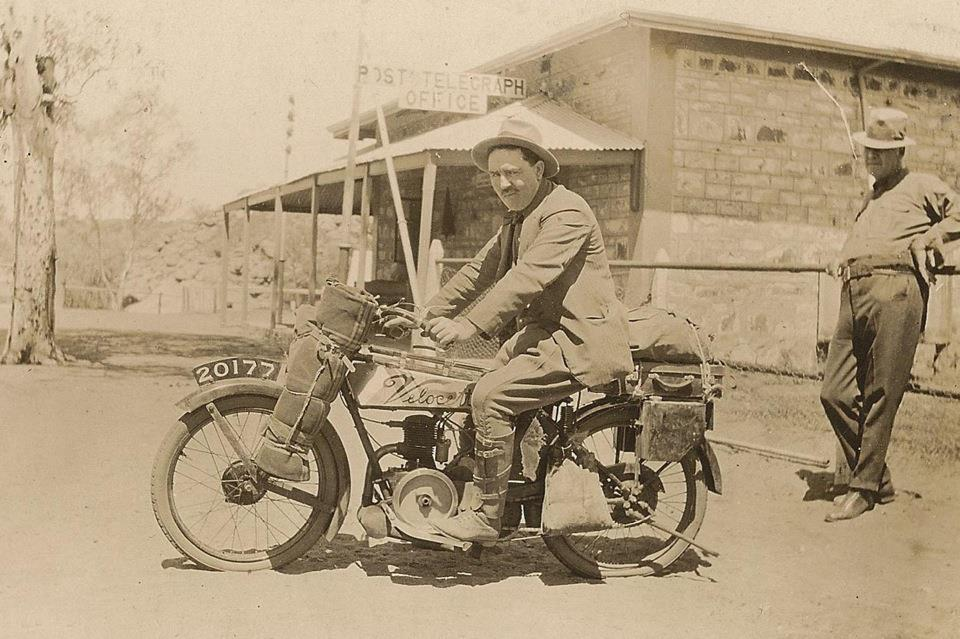
Harold Nelson in a 1922 attempt to cross Australia by motorcycle (a Velocette GC3) in 1922

Nelson married Maud Alice Lawrence on 17 March 1904 in Mount Perry, Queensland. The couple had five children, including John Norman "Jock" Nelson who followed his father into politics.

In 1922, Nelson attempted to cross Australia north-south on a 1922 Velocette motorcycle, but failed, and nearly died of dehydration en route.

Nelson died from unexpected cardiac failure after a long illness in Alice Springs on 26 April 1947, survived by his wife and five children. His son Jock Nelson also served as member for the Northern Territory and in 1973 became the first Territory born Northern Territory Administrator.

== Legacy ==
The Northern Territory Electoral division of Nelson is named for him.

== Popular culture ==
As Nelson is usually referred to by his initials "HG", it is unclear whether Australian comedian Greig Pickhaver named his character H. G. Nelson in honour of Nelson.

Parliament of Australia
| New division | Member for Northern Territory; 1922–1934 | Succeeded by Adair Blain |
