= Adair Blain =

Australian politician (1894–1983)

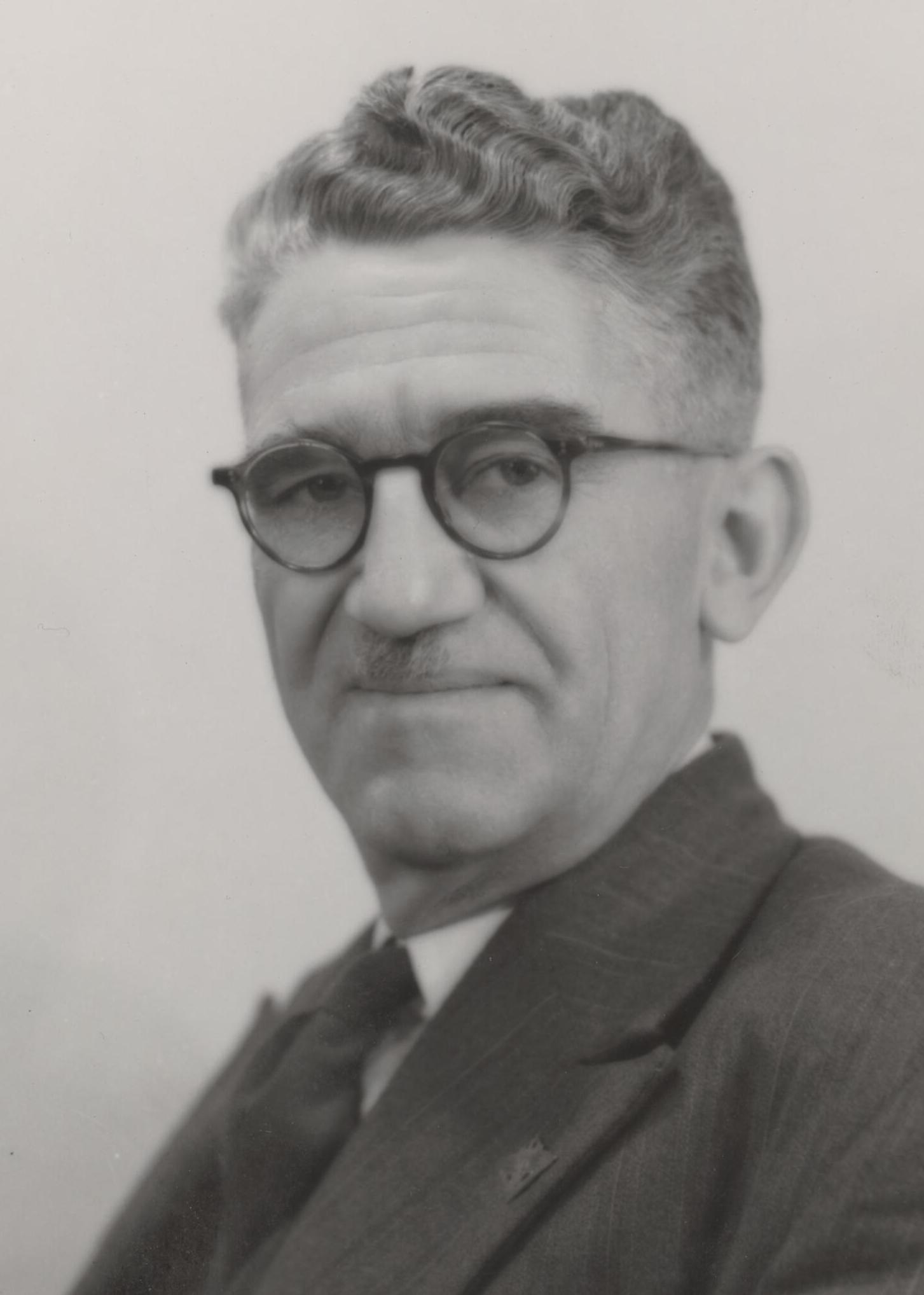

Member of the Australian Parliament for Northern Territory
- In office 15 September 1934 – 10 December 1949
- Preceded by: H. G. Nelson
- Succeeded by: Jock Nelson

Personal details
- Born: 21 November 1894 Inverell, New South Wales
- Died: 28 April 1983 (aged 88)
- Party: Independent
- Occupation: Surveyor

Adair Macalister Blain (21 November 1894 – 28 April 1983) was an Australian politician and soldier. He represented the Division of Northern Territory in the House of Representatives from 1934 to 1949, albeit with limited voting rights. He enlisted in the army during World War II and was captured by the Japanese after the Fall of Singapore, the only serving member of parliament to become a prisoner of war.

== Early life ==
Born in Inverell, New South Wales, Blain was educated in Perth, Western Australia (he was a foundation student at Perth Modern School when it opened in 1911) and the University of Adelaide and worked as a surveyor in Western Australia.

Following the outbreak of World War I, Blain served as a corporal in the 32nd Battalion of the First Australian Imperial Force in France from 1916 to 1919, during which he was wounded twice. Returning from Europe, Blain worked as a surveyor in Northern Queensland before moving to the Northern Territory in 1929 to become the Darwin area surveyor.

== Politics ==
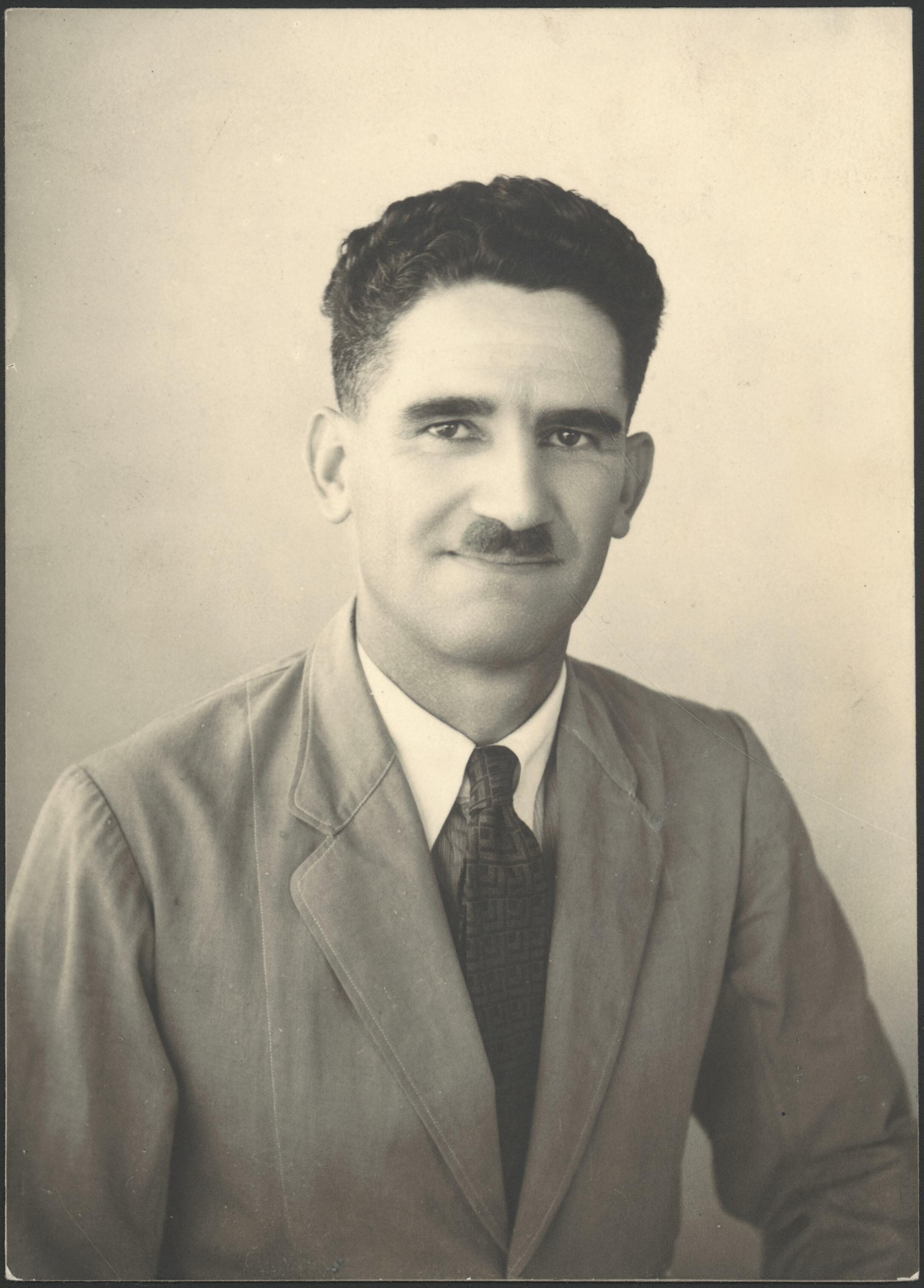
Blain in 1936

Blain's work took him throughout northern Australia, giving him the opportunity to gain a high profile, which he used at the 1934 federal election, when, standing as an independent for the Division of Northern Territory, Blain defeated the incumbent Labor member Harold Nelson.

During the 1934 election campaign Blain promised to resign from parliament if the Northern Territory representative was not granted full voting rights in parliament. He reneged on this promise but continued to campaign for greater Territory control of Northern Territory affairs.

After changing his year of birth to 1897, Blain enrolled in the Army during World War II and served as a sergeant in the 2/12 Field Company, Royal Australian Engineers (part of the ill-fated 8th Division, AIF) and sent to Malaya. Captured by the Japanese following the Fall of Singapore in 1942, Blain was a Prisoner of War, first in Singapore and later in Sandakan, Borneo, until his release in September 1945. During his time as a POW in Borneo he was tortured by the Japanese military police for planning to escape and sentenced to eighteen months in prison. Blain remains the only serving member of the House of Representatives to have been a prisoner of war. Blain returned to Australia, and upon re-entering the House, wearing his uniform, was the subject of a standing ovation from his fellow members. He was then ordered to return to hospital where he spent the next two months recovering before returning to parliament.

Although officially an Independent, Blain worked closely with the Country Party and while he was absent on wartime duties, Blain asked the Country Party member for Barker, Archie Cameron to act on his behalf.

While serving as a POW, Blain was re-elected unopposed to his Northern Territory seat at the 1943 election, and elected again in 1946 before losing his seat at the 1949 election to Labor challenger Jock Nelson (the son of Harold Nelson, who Blain defeated in 1934).

== Later life ==
Following his defeat, Blain moved to New South Wales to work as a surveyor.

The Northern Territory Electoral division of Blain is named for him.

Actor Brian Blain is his nephew.

Parliament of Australia
| Preceded by Harold Nelson | Member for Northern Territory; 1934–1949 | Succeeded by Jock Nelson |
