= John A. Gilruth =

Australian government official (1871–1937)

John Gilruth
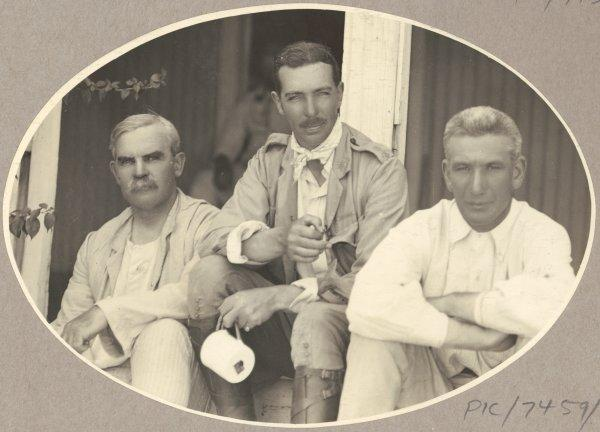
- John Gilruth 1912
- Born: 17 February 1871; Auchmithie, Scotland
- Died: 4 March 1937 (aged 66); South Yarra, Victoria, Australia
- Occupation: veterinary scientist
- Known for: Administrator of the Northern Territory from 1912 to 1918

John Anderson Gilruth FRSE (17 February 1871 – 4 March 1937) was a Scottish-Australian veterinary scientist and administrator. He is particularly noted for being Administrator of the Northern Territory from 1912 to 1918, when he was recalled after an angry mob demanded that he resign. This incident is known as the Darwin Rebellion.

== Early life and education ==
John Anderson Gilruth was born in Auchmithie near Arbroath on 17 February 1871, the son of Andrew Gilruth.

He was educated at Arbroath High School and the High School of Dundee, then served two years as clerk to an Arbroath solicitor before going to Glasgow Veterinary College, now the Faculty of Veterinary Medicine at the University of Glasgow in 1887. He was admitted to membership of the Royal College of Veterinary Surgeons, London, in 1892.

== Career ==
After qualifying, Gilruth then accepted appointment as a government veterinary surgeon in New Zealand and moved there in 1893. He spent three years investigating stock diseases, then went to Paris, France, to spend a year studying bacteriology at the Pasteur Institute.

In 1896, on returning to New Zealand, he was appointed chief veterinarian and government bacteriologist. He was appointed to a royal commission on public health and subsequently, in 1901, pathologist in the new Department of Public Health.

In 1907 he was elected a fellow of the Royal Society of Edinburgh; his proposers were Frederick Hobday, Sir John McFadyean, John Berry Haycraft, and Sir Edward Albert Sharpey-Schafer.

In 1908, he accepted the foundation chair of veterinary pathology at the University of Melbourne.

In 1911 the Australian Prime Minister Andrew Fisher invited him to join a scientific mission to the Northern Territory with Walter Baldwin Spencer (the 1911 Preliminary Scientific Expedition). On this trip he was inspired by the potential for economic development there through mining, crop-growing and pastoralism and, based on this, he accepted the position of Administrator in 1912; he was the first Commonwealth Government appointed Administrator. In the role Gilruth was frustrated and felt that, despite potential, there were unrealistically high hopes for economic development which meant that every set-back was doubly condemned.

On 17 December 1918 public discontent with John peaked in what is now known as the Darwin Rebellion. This rebellion was led by Harold Nelson, and it saw over 1,000 demonstrators march on Government House where they burnt an effigy of him.

Gilruth and his family left Darwin soon afterwards, in February 1919.

Soon after he began working for the Council for Scientific and Industrial Research, now the CSIRO in a number of roles.

He retired in 1935.

== Publications ==
Gilruth published many studies and articles on veterinary research in professional journals.

The following book has also been published about him:

- Gilruth : a complex man John Anderson Gilruth : first Commonwealth Administrator of the Northern Territory of Australia 1912-1919 by Ted Egan.

== Recognition ==
In 1933 he was elected president of the Australian Veterinary Association, and in 1936 was awarded honorary membership.

== Death and legacy ==
Gilruth died of a respiratory infection on 4 March 1937 at his home at South Yarra, Melbourne.

Several entities were named in his honour:

- Gilruth Plains, a research station near Cunnamulla, Queensland, Australia
- Gilruth Prize, the "most prestigious award" of the Australian Veterinary Association
- Gilruth Avenue, Darwin

A portrait of Gilruth, painted by Will Longstaff, hangs in the Australian Animal Health Laboratory in Geelong, Victoria.

== Personal life ==
Gilruth married Jeannie McLean McKay on 20 March 1899 at Dunedin, New Zealand. A son and two daughters survived him.
