= Sam Calder =

Australian politician and World War II flying ace

Sam Calder AM, OBE, DFC
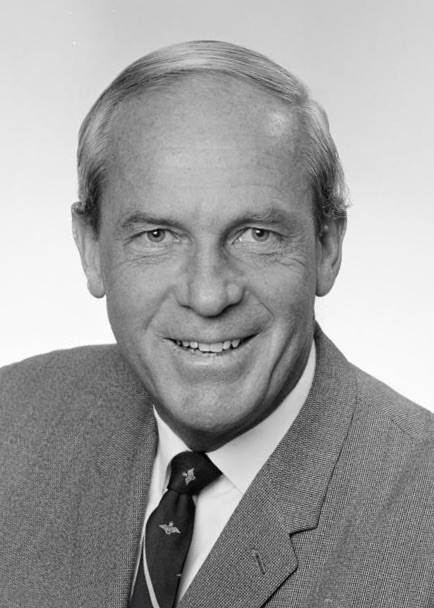

Member of the Australian Parliament for Northern Territory
- In office 26 November 1966 – 19 September 1980
- Preceded by: Jock Nelson
- Succeeded by: Grant Tambling

Personal details
- Born: 10 August 1916 Melbourne, Victoria
- Died: 30 September 2008 (aged 92) Darwin, Northern Territory
- Party: Country Party (NT) (until 1974); Country Liberal Party (since 1974); National Country Party (federal)
- Spouse: Daphne Campbell (1926-2013)
- Occupation: Pilot, Politician

Stephen Edward "Sam" Calder AM, OBE, DFC (10 August 1916 – 30 September 2008) was a decorated World War II flying ace, member of the Australian House of Representatives, and one of the founders of the Northern Territory Country Liberal Party. In federal parliament, he sat with the Country Party, later renamed the National Country Party.

== Early life ==
Calder was born in Melbourne, Victoria and educated at Melbourne Grammar before joining the Royal Australian Air Force in 1932. Trained as a pilot, Calder flew Typhoon planes throughout World War II, completing 120 missions over Europe and receiving the Distinguished Flying Cross.

Following the end of hostilities in 1945, Calder returned to Australia and worked as the chief pilot for Northern Territory-based airline Connellan Airways. The airline prospered as it provided a vast network of medical, passenger and mail services throughout the Northern Territory.

The airline eventually collapsed following a decision by Northern Territory Chief Minister Paul Everingham, a political opponent of Calder, to give competing airline Ansett Airlines the rights to the Darwin-Alice Springs route. Not content with this, Calder also took on the challenge of managing cattle stations the size of some European countries.

Calder married Australian actress Daphne Campbell after they met while she was filming the 1946 Anglo-Australian film The Overlanders in the Northern Territory.

== Politics ==
Calder's high profile in the Northern Territory led federal Country Party leader John McEwen to ask him to stand as a Country Party candidate at the 1966 federal election in the Division of Northern Territory. A conservative party had never won the seat, and it was considered a Labor stronghold. The Country Party had last run a candidate there in 1954. Calder took advantage of the retirement of longtime Labor MP Jock Nelson to win the seat by only 400-odd votes in 1966. He extended that margin into thousands over the next decade and a half.

Though he seldom addressed parliament, leading to his nickname "Silent Sam", Calder played an active role, pushing for development in the Northern Territory, and could claim some of the credit for the construction of the Adelaide-Alice Springs train line and several new roads. He also took a measure of credit for the Member for Northern Territory being granted full voting rights in 1968, as well as the Northern Territory being granted a fully elected Legislative Assembly, self-government, Senate representation, and the right to vote in national referendums.

After the creation of the Legislative Assembly, Calder helped persuade the Territory's Liberal and Country parties to merge into the Country Liberal Party, which held government in the Northern Territory for over a quarter of a century. Calder also had many ambitious plans which failed to see the light of day, including Northern Territory statehood and a nuclear power station in the Territory. He retired in 1980.

For his entire political career, Calder was a staunch opponent of Aboriginal land rights, believing that the then governing Labor Party had sold Australia to the Aboriginals. Even in retirement, Calder continued to fight the furthering of Aboriginal rights, arguing that they made Aboriginals lazy.

Calder died in Darwin late in the evening of 30 September 2008, aged 92.

== See also ==
- List of World War II aces from Australia

Parliament of Australia
Preceded by Jock Nelson	Member for Northern Territory; 1966–1980	Succeeded by Grant Tambling
