= Division of Northern Territory =

Former Australian federal electoral division

Coordinates: 20°0′S 133°0′E

Northern Territory Australian House of Representatives Division
- Map of the Northern Territory
- Created: 1922
- Abolished: 2001
- Namesake: Northern Territory
- Demographic: Provincial, rural and remote

The Division of Northern Territory was an Australian electoral division in the Northern Territory for the Parliament of Australia. Throughout its existence, it was the only Division in the Northern Territory. At the redistribution of 21 December 2000, the Division was divided into two new divisions, which were named the Division of Solomon, which covered the area immediately around Darwin, and the Division of Lingiari, which covered the remainder of the territory.

== History ==
Until 1911, the Northern Territory was a part of South Australia and from 1890 was represented in the South Australian House of Assembly by two members from the Electoral district of Northern Territory. In 1911, however, the Northern Territory was transferred to the Commonwealth government, which also deprived Territorians of all political representation. The first Commonwealth census held in 1911 disclosed the Territory had a non-Aboriginal population of 3,271, comprising 2,673 males and 598 females.

In 1922, the Northern Territory Representation Act 1922 was passed by the Australian Parliament to give the Territory a single non-voting member in the House of Representatives.

The federal Division of Northern Territory was first contested at the 1922 federal election. Its first member was Harold George Nelson, who had led the agitation which unseated the Administrator in 1918. In 1927, the Northern Territory was split into the separate territories of Central Australia and North Australia; there remained only one electoral division and the split was reversed in 1931. Before 1968, the Member for Northern Territory did not have full voting rights, and did not count for the purposes of forming government. Between 1922 and 1936, he could speak in the House and take part in committee work, but could not vote. Between 1936 and 1959 he was only able to veto motions to disallow laws made for the Territory, and between 1959 and 1968, he could only vote on matters relating to the Territory alone. In 1968, the Member for Northern Territory acquired full voting rights.

In 1984, the external territories of Christmas Island and Cocos (Keeling) Islands were incorporated into the Division for electoral purposes.

The Division of Northern Territory was divided on 21 December 2000 into two new divisions – Solomon, which covered the Darwin area, and the Lingiari, which covers the remainder of the Territory – with Warren Snowdon, the last member for the united division, transferring to Lingiari.

On 19 February 2003, the new Divisions were nominally abolished and the Territory returned to a single Division, but on 28 April 2004 the Commonwealth Electoral Amendment (Representation in the House of Representatives) Act 2004 passed by the Australian Parliament leaved the Northern Territory divided into two Divisions.

== Members ==
Image	Member	Party	Term	Notes
	H. G. Nelson (1881–1947)	Labor	16 December 1922 – 15 September 1934	Lost seat. Son was Jock Nelson
	Adair Blain (1894–1983)	Independent	15 September 1934 – 10 December 1949	Lost seat
	Jock Nelson (1908–1991)	Labor	10 December 1949 – 31 October 1966	Retired. Last member of the House of Representatives to be elected unopposed, in 1963. Father was H. G. Nelson
	Sam Calder (1916–2008)	Country	26 November 1966 – 20 July 1974	Retired
	Sam Calder (1916–2008)	Country Liberal	20 July 1974 – 19 September 1980	Retired
	Grant Tambling (1943–2025)	Country Liberal	18 October 1980 – 5 March 1983	Previously held the Northern Territory Legislative Assembly seat of Fannie Bay. Lost seat. Later elected to the Senate in 1987
	John Reeves (1952–)	Labor	5 March 1983 – 1 December 1984	Lost seat
	Paul Everingham (1943–)	Country Liberal	1 December 1984 – 5 June 1987	Previously held the Northern Territory Legislative Assembly seat of Jingili. Previously served as Chief Minister of the Northern Territory from 1978 to 1984. Retired
	Warren Snowdon (1950–)	Labor	11 July 1987 – 2 March 1996	Lost seat
	Nick Dondas (1939–2024)	Country Liberal	2 March 1996 – 3 October 1998	Previously held the Northern Territory Legislative Assembly seat of Casuarina. Lost seat
	Warren Snowdon (1950–)	Labor	3 October 1998 – 10 November 2001	Transferred to the Division of Lingiari after Northern Territory was abolished in 2001
