= Warren Snowdon =

Australian politician

The Honourable Warren Snowdon
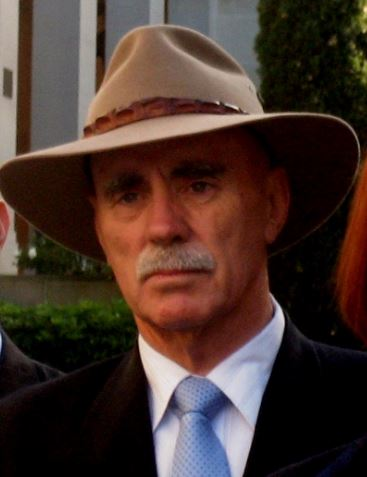
- Snowdon in 2011

Minister for Defence Science and Personnel
- In office 14 September 2010 – 18 September 2013
- Prime Minister: Julia Gillard; Kevin Rudd
- Preceded by: Alan Griffin
- Succeeded by: Stuart Robert
- In office 3 December 2007 – 9 June 2009
- Prime Minister: Kevin Rudd
- Preceded by: No immediate predecessor
- Succeeded by: Alan Griffin

Minister Assisting the Prime Minister on the Centenary of ANZAC
- In office 3 March 2011 – 18 September 2013
- Prime Minister: Julia Gillard; Kevin Rudd
- Preceded by: Office Established
- Succeeded by: Michael Ronaldson

Minister for Veterans' Affairs
- In office 13 September 2010 – 18 September 2013
- Prime Minister: Julia Gillard; Kevin Rudd
- Preceded by: Alan Griffin
- Succeeded by: Michael Ronaldson

Minister for Indigenous Health
- In office 9 June 2009 – 18 September 2013
- Prime Minister: Kevin Rudd; Julia Gillard
- Preceded by: No immediate predecessor
- Succeeded by: Fiona Nash

Member of the Australian Parliament for Lingiari
- In office 10 November 2001 – 21 May 2022
- Preceded by: New seat
- Succeeded by: Marion Scrymgour

Member of the Australian Parliament for Northern Territory
- In office 3 October 1998 – 10 November 2001
- Preceded by: Nick Dondas
- Succeeded by: Division abolished
- In office 11 July 1987 – 2 March 1996
- Preceded by: Paul Everingham
- Succeeded by: Nick Dondas

Personal details
- Born: Warren Edward Snowdon; 20 March 1950 (age 76) Canberra, Australian Capital Territory, Australia
- Party: Australian Labor Party
- Spouse: Elizabeth Verstappen
- Children: 4
- Education: Australian National University, University of Western Australia
- Occupation: Politician
- Profession: Teacher

Warren Edward Snowdon (born 20 March 1950) is an Australian former politician who served as a member of the House of Representatives from July 1987 to March 1996, and again from October 1998 until May 2022. He initially represented the Division of Northern Territory, and later the Division of Lingiari. His electorate encompassed all the residents of the Northern Territory located outside Darwin, as well as Christmas Island and the Cocos (Keeling) Islands in the Indian Ocean. He was the last sitting MP who was first elected in the 1980s, and the last who served in Old Parliament House.

Snowdon was the Minister for Defence Science and Personnel, Minister for Veterans' Affairs, Minister for Indigenous Health, and Minister Assisting the Prime Minister on the Centenary of Anzac in the Second Rudd ministry. Snowdon was a member of the left faction of the Labor Party.

Snowdon did not contest the 2022 federal election and retired from politics.

== Early life and career ==
Snowdon was born in Canberra and educated at St Edmund's College, followed by tertiary studies at the Australian National University and the University of Western Australia.

Before entering federal politics, he was a teacher in the Commonwealth and Northern Territory teaching services (1976–78, and again 1981–83). He also spent time as a researcher at ANU from 1978 to 1981.

From 1983 to 1987, Snowdon was senior project officer at Central Land Council in Alice Springs, Northern Territory. During this period he helped establish labour representation for workers in central Australia: he was founding president of the Central Australian Regional Trades and Labour Council, and later became Assistant Secretary of the Northern Territory Trades and Labour Council.

== Political career ==
Snowdon was Parliamentary Secretary to the Minister for Transport and Communications 1990–92, Parliamentary Secretary to the Minister for Employment, Education and Training 1992–96, Parliamentary Secretary to the Minister for Environment, Sport and Territories 1993 and 1994–96 and Parliamentary Secretary (Territories) 1993–94.

Defeated at the 1996 federal election, Snowdon returned to parliament two years later. He served as Parliamentary Secretary to the Shadow Minister for Regional and Urban Development, Transport and Infrastructure (Northern Australia and the Territories) 2001–04. From 2004 to 2007 he was Shadow Parliamentary Secretary for Northern Australia and Indigenous Affairs.

Snowdon was sworn in as Minister for Defence Science and Personnel in the First Rudd ministry on 3 December 2007. Following a reshuffle of the Ministry on 9 June 2009 as a result of the resignation of the Defence Minister, Joel Fitzgibbon, Snowdon was promoted to Minister for Indigenous Health, Rural and Regional Health and Regional Service Delivery. On 14 September 2010, he gained the portfolio of Veterans' Affairs and regained Defence Science and Personnel, while losing responsibility for Rural and Regional Health and Regional Service Delivery, but retaining Indigenous Health. On 12 September 2011 he was given the added responsibility of Minister Assisting the Prime Minister on the Centenary of ANZAC.

Snowdon narrowly retained his seat at the 2013 federal election, largely due to his winning all but five booths. However, Snowdon was not appointed to the shadow ministry.

Snowdon was re-elected in the 2016 federal election with a seven-point swing towards him, becoming the longest-serving MP in the House, and the only member who was first elected in the 1980s. Snowdon was however not the Father of the House due to his continuous service only beginning from 1998. Kevin Andrews, whose continuous service began from 1991, became Father of the House instead. Snowdon again retained his seat at the 2019 federal election.

He sat on the "Inquiry into the destruction of 46,000-year-old caves at the Juukan Gorge in the Pilbara region of Western Australia" from June 2020.

In reference to his service from Old Parliament House, Snowdon said: "I'm a bit of a relic. I'm the only one left in this parliament - Senate or House of Reps - from the Old Parliament House."

Snowdon did not contest the 2022 federal election and retired from politics.

Political offices
New title	Minister for Indigenous Health; 2009–2013	Succeeded by Fiona Nash as Assistant Minister for Health
Preceded by Alan Griffin	Minister for Veterans' Affairs; 2010–2013	Succeeded by Michael Ronaldson
Preceded by Greg Combet	Minister for Defence Science and Personnel; 2010–2013	Succeeded by Stuart Robert as Assistant Minister for Defence
Preceded by Bronwyn Bishop	Minister for Defence Science and Personnel; 2007–2009	Succeeded by Greg Combet
Parliament of Australia
New division	Member for Lingiari; 2001–2022	Succeeded by Marion Scrymgour
Preceded by Nick Dondas	Member for Northern Territory; 1998–2001	Division abolished
Preceded by Paul Everingham	Member for Northern Territory; 1987–1996	Succeeded by Nick Dondas
