= Government House, Darwin =

Office of the Administrator of the Northern Territory, Australia

Government House
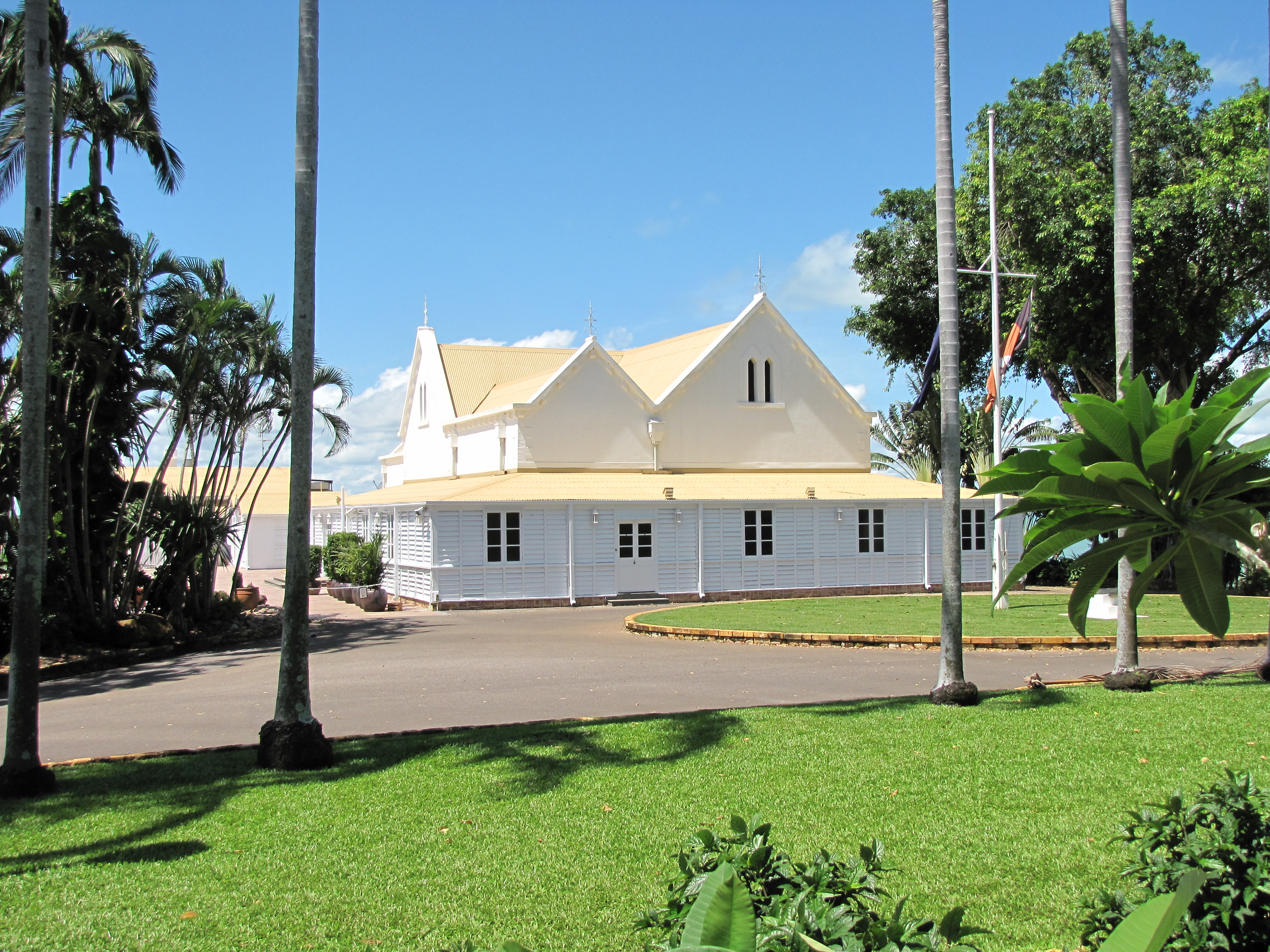
- Interactive map of the Government House area

General information
- Type: Official residence
- Architectural style: Victorian Gothic
- Location: Darwin, Australia
- Coordinates: 12°28′06″S 130°50′37″E
- Current tenants: Administrator of the Northern Territory
- Construction started: 1870
- Completed: 1871
- Renovated: 1878–1879

Technical details
- Grounds: 13,000 square metres (3.2 acres)

Government House is the office and official residence of the Administrator of the Northern Territory in Darwin, Australia. Built between 1870 and 1871, with later renovations between 1878 and 1879, the building is set on 13,000 square metres of hillside gardens in the centre of the Darwin business district, on The Esplanade.

== History ==
Government House is the oldest European building in the Northern Territory. Government House has been the home of successive Government Residents and Administrators since 1871. The house is an example of a mid-Victorian Gothic villa, here adapted for the local climate by the addition of numerous shaded verandahs and porches. It has endured cyclones, earthquakes, enemy bombing raids, infestations of white ants and rowdy public demonstrations to remain one of the most spectacular and attractive buildings in Darwin.

Of its construction early resident Harriet Douglas Daly said:

Building this house was a matter of great difficulty...In fact the word seems to be the one most frequently associated with every...enterprise connected with the Northern Territory...Robinson Crusoe had nothing like the difficulties in obtaining building material that we had...we literally had to begin at the beginning of everything...from the very laying of the foundationstone...nothing but difficulties and makeshifts attended the work

— Harriet Douglas Daly, Digging, Squatting, and Pioneering Life in the Northern Territory of South Australia, 1887, p. 109

On 17 December 1918, Government House became the focal point of political turmoil and union unrest against John Gilruth's administration. About 1000 demonstrators marched to Government House where they burnt an effigy of Gilruth and demanded his resignation. The incident became well known as the Darwin Rebellion.

Government House was entered on the now-defunct Register of the National Estate on 14 May 1991 and was added to the Northern Territory Heritage Register on 19 March 1996.

== Some former residents ==
Some former residents include:

- Bloomfield Douglas, the first Government Resident of the Northern Territory, and his family. His family included his daughter Harriet Douglas Daly, who wrote about the construction of the building and early experiences of living there in her book Digging, squatting and pioneering life in the Northern Territory of South Australia (1887).
- John Anderson Gilruth, Administrator of the Northern Territory from 1912 - 1919; during his term of office, the Darwin rebellion erupted. As a part of this rebellion, over 1,000 demonstrators marched on Government House and burnt an effigy of him.
- Aubrey Abbott, Administrator of the Northern Territory from 1937 - 1945, and his wife Hilda Abbott who lived there during the Bombing of Darwin when it was partially destroyed. The pair donated the bomb damaged flag to the Australian War Memorial as they believed it to be the first flag to have been damaged on Australian soil by enemy action.

== Gallery ==
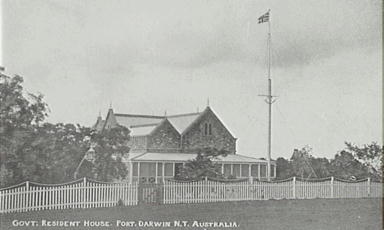
Darwin's Government House in 1913, with Liberty Square in foreground.

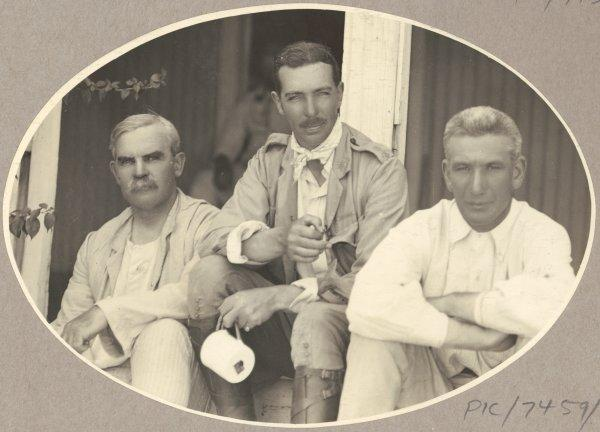
From left: Minister Josiah Thomas, Sir Walter Barttelot and Administrator John Gilruth in 1912.

== See also ==
- Government Houses of Australia
- Government Houses in the Commonwealth
- Administrators of the Northern Territory
