= Electoral results for the Australian Senate in the Northern Territory =

This is a list of electoral results for the Australian Senate in the Northern Territory since 1975.

== Election results ==
=== Elections in the 2020s ===
==== 2025 ====
The incumbent senators in the Northern Territory whose seats were vacated at this election are:

- The Hon Malarndirri McCarthy (ALP)
- Jacinta Price (CLP)

2025 Australian federal election: Senate, Northern Territory
Party	Candidate	Votes	%	±%
Quota		32,700		
Labor	1. Malarndirri McCarthy (elected 1); 2. Michael William Alsop	34,472	35.14	+2.17
Country Liberal	1. Jacinta Nampijinpa Price (elected 2); 2. Dean Hersey	32,523	33.15	+1.45
Greens	1. Aia Newport; 2. Hugo Wells	10,733	10.94	−1.32
One Nation	1. Darren Nugent; 2. Caine Hewes	7,539	7.69	+7.69
Legalise Cannabis	1. Lance Alfred Lawrence; 2. Suzette Luyken	5,184	5.28	−0.95
Sustainable Australia	1. Ian Chivers; 2. Lamaan Whyte	4,385	4.47	+2.81
Libertarian	1. Jed Hansen; 2. Trevor Smith	1,312	1.34	+1.34
Ungrouped	Que Kenny	983	1.00	+0.43
Citizens	1. Lionel Wylie; 2. Trudy Campbell	966	0.98	+0.06
Total formal votes		98,097	95.98	−0.94
Informal votes		4,113	4.02	+0.94
Turnout		102,210	65.70	−7.60

Results are not final. Last updated on 13 May 2025 at 7:20 PM AEST.

==== 2022 ====
#	Senator	Party
1	Malarndirri McCarthy	Labor
2	Jacinta Nampijinpa Price	CLP

2022 Australian federal election: Senate, Northern Territory
Party	Candidate	Votes	%	±%
Quota		34,540		
Labor	1. Malarndirri McCarthy (elected 1); 2. Kate Ganley	34,163	32.97	–4.50
Country Liberal	1. Jacinta Nampijinpa Price (elected 2); 2. Kris Civitarese	32,846	31.70	−4.97
Greens	1. Jane Anzelark; 2. Dianne Stokes	12,707	12.26	+2.02
Liberal Democrats	1. Sam McMahon; 2. Jed Hansen	9,609	9.27	+9.27
Legalise Cannabis	1. Lance Lawrence; 2. Kelly-Anne Hibbert	6,455	6.23	+2.40
Great Australian	1. Steve Arrigo; 2. Angela Marcus	4,573	4.41	+4.41
Sustainable Australia	1. Lamaan White; 2. Richard Belcher	1,715	1.66	+1.66
Citizens	1. Trudy Campbell; 2. Peter Flynn	956	0.92	+0.48
United Australia	Raj Rajwin	593	0.57	−0.66
Total formal votes		103,617	96.92	+0.56
Informal votes		3,290	3.08	−0.56
Turnout		106,907	73.30	−4.91
Party total seats			Seats	±
Labor			1	Steady
Country Liberal			1	Steady

=== Elections in the 2010s ===
==== 2019 ====
2019 Australian federal election: Senate, Northern Territory
Party	Candidate	Votes	%	±%
Quota		35,010		
Labor	1. Malarndirri McCarthy (elected 1); 2. Wayne Kurnorth	39,353	37.47	+0.03
Country Liberal	1. Sam McMahon (elected 2); 2. Joshua Burgoyne	38,513	36.67	+0.25
Greens	1. Anna Sri; 2. Lia Gill	10,752	10.24	−0.54
United Australia	1. Michael Wolf; 2. Ross McRobert	6,469	6.16	+6.16
HEMP	1. Andrew Kavasilas; 2. Lance Lawrence	4,027	3.83	+3.83
Conservative National	1. Jan Pile; 2. Leslie Harris	2,207	2.10	+2.10
Rise Up Australia	1. Carol Ordish; 2. John Ordish	1,955	1.86	−4.77
Group D	1. Braedon Early; 2. Crystal Johnson	1,290	1.23	+1.23
Citizens Electoral Council	1. Trudy Campbell; 2. Ian Barry	461	0.44	−0.79
Total formal votes		105,027	96.36	−0.31
Informal votes		3,967	3.64	+0.31
Turnout		108,994	78.21	−1.07

Elected	#	Senator	Party
2019	1	Malarndirri McCarthy	Labor
2019	2	Sam McMahon	CLP

==== 2016 ====
2016 Australian federal election: Senate, Northern Territory
Party	Candidate	Votes	%	±%
Quota		34,010		
Labor	1. Malarndirri McCarthy (elected 1); 2. Pat Honan	38,197	37.44	+4.69
Country Liberal	1. Nigel Scullion (elected 2); 2. Jenni Lillis	37,156	36.42	−4.92
Greens	1. Michael Connard; 2. Kathy Bannister	11,003	10.78	+2.11
Rise Up Australia	1. Jan Pile; 2. Jimmy Gimini	6,768	6.63	+5.69
Sex Party–HEMP joint ticket	1. Andrew Kavasilas; 2. Timothy Jones	4,956	4.86	+4.86
Christian Democrats	1. Carol Ordish; 2. John Ordish	1,660	1.63	+1.63
Citizens Electoral Council	1. Trudy Campbell; 2. Ian Barry	1,255	1.23	+0.93
Ungrouped	TS Lee; Tristan Marshall; Maurie Japarta Ryan; Marney MacDonald; Greg Strettles	1,032	1.01	+1.01
Total formal votes		102,027	96.67	−0.66
Informal votes		3,512	3.33	+0.66
Turnout		105,539	79.34	−3.03

#	Senator	Party
1	Malarndirri McCarthy	Labor
2	Nigel Scullion	CLP

==== 2013 ====
2013 Australian federal election: Senate, Northern Territory
Party	Candidate	Votes	%	±%
Quota		34,494		
Country Liberal	1. Nigel Scullion (elected 1); 2. Linda Fazldeen	42,781	41.34	+0.73
Labor	1. Nova Peris (elected 2); 2. Rowan Foley	33,889	32.75	−1.64
Greens	1. Warren H Williams; 2. Michael Brand	8,974	8.67	−4.88
Palmer United	1. Douglas Te Wake; 2. John McCabe	7,386	7.14	+7.14
Shooters and Fishers	1. Matt Graham; 2. Christopher Righton	2,814	2.72	−2.08
Sex Party	1. Joanne Edwards; 2. Tracey Randall	2,203	2.13	−2.97
Australian Independents	1. Phil Walcott; 2. Lisa Futcher	1,544	1.49	+1.49
First Nations	1. Rosalie Kunoth-Monks; 2. Jeannie Gadambua	1,495	1.44	+1.44
Rise Up Australia	1. Jan Pile; 2. Michael Cox	975	0.94	+0.94
Uniting Australia	1. Gary Bell; 2. Kathryn Watt	656	0.63	+0.63
Stable Population	1. Jim Miles; 2. Mark Russell	455	0.44	+0.44
Citizens Electoral Council	1. Vernon Work; 2. Mile Stankovic	307	0.30	−0.62
Total formal votes		103,479	97.33	+1.02
Informal votes		2,837	2.67	−1.02
Turnout		106,316	82.29	−0.64

Elected	#	Senator	Party
2013	1	Nigel Scullion	CLP
2013	2	Nova Peris	Labor

==== 2010 ====
2010 Australian federal election: Senate, Northern Territory
Party	Candidate	Votes	%	±%
Quota		32,230		
Country Liberal	1. Nigel Scullion (elected 1); 2. Rhianna Harker	39,268	40.61	+0.58
Labor	1. Trish Crossin (elected 2); 2. Matthew Gardiner	33,253	34.39	−12.55
Greens	1. Warren H. Williams; 2. Debbie Hudson	13,105	13.55	+4.73
Sex Party	1. Seranna Shutt; 2. Shana Leitens	4,930	5.10	+5.10
Shooters and Fishers	1. Phillip Hoare; 2. Matt Graham	4,640	4.80	+4.80
Citizens Electoral Council	1. Vernon Work; 2. Graham Setterberg	888	0.92	−1.09
Independent	Ian Lee	314	0.32	+0.32
Democrats	Duncan Dean	170	0.18	+0.18
First Nations	Liam Flenady	119	0.12	+0.12
Total formal votes		96,687	96.31	−1.75
Informal votes		3,708	3.69	+1.75
Turnout		100,395	82.93	−3.95

Elected	#	Senator	Party
2010	1	Nigel Scullion	CLP
2010	2	Trish Crossin	Labor

Country Liberals Senator Nigel Scullion, who is also deputy leader of the National Party of Australia, was re-elected with well over a quota of votes. Labor Senator Trish Crossin was also re-elected, with just over (1.04x) a quota of votes. Although the Greens received the next highest number of votes, the two NT Senators were elected on quotas, leaving no room for preference flows.

=== Elections in the 2000s ===
==== 2007 ====
Elected	#	Senator	Party
2007	1	Trish Crossin	Labor
2007	2	Nigel Scullion	CLP

2007 Australian federal election: Senate, Northern Territory
Party	Candidate	Votes	%	±%
Quota		33,524		
Labor	1. Trish Crossin (elected 1); 2. Kim Hill	47,205	46.94	+5.57
Country Liberal	1. Nigel Scullion (elected 2); 2. Bernadette Wallace	40,253	40.03	−5.37
Greens	1. Alan Tyley; 2. Gregory Goodluck	8,870	8.82	+1.22
Citizens Electoral Council	1. Peter Flynn; 2. Vernon Work	2,019	2.01	+2.01
Democrats	1. Duncan Dean; 2. Joe Faggion	1,949	1.94	−2.79
Independent	Bernardine Atkinson	273	0.27	
Total formal votes		100,569	98.06	+1.18
Informal votes		1,994	1.94	−1.18
Turnout		102,563	86.88	+2.47

==== 2004 ====
Elected	#	Senator	Party
2004	1	Nigel Scullion	CLP
2004	2	Trish Crossin	Labor

2004 Australian federal election: Senate, Northern Territory
Party	Candidate	Votes	%	±%
Quota		30,785		
Country Liberal	1. Nigel Scullion (elected 1); 2. Bernadette Greg	41,923	45.40	+1.69
Labor	1. Trish Crossin (elected 2); 2. Wayne Connop	38,204	41.37	+2.15
Greens	1. Mark Wakeham; 2. Shan McKenzie	7,016	7.60	+3.33
Democrats	1. Janeen Bulsey; 2. Fay Lawrence	4,368	4.73	−2.57
Socialist Alliance	1. Ray Hayes; 2. Kathy Newnam	569	0.62	+0.62
Independent	Wayne Wright	270	0.29	+0.29
Total formal votes		92,350	96.88	−0.36
Informal votes		2,973	3.12	+0.36
Turnout		95,323	84.73	−1.47

==== 2001 ====
Elected	#	Senator	Party
2001	1	Nigel Scullion	CLP
2001	2	Trish Crossin	Labor

2001 Australian federal election: Senate, Northern Territory
Party	Candidate	Votes	%	±%
Quota		31,021		
Country Liberal	1. Nigel Scullion (elected 1); 2. John Lopes	40,680	43.71	+4.9
Labor	1. Trish Crossin (elected 2); 2. Olga Havnen	36,500	39.22	−2.0
Democrats	1. David Curtis; 2. Joe Faggion	6,796	7.30	+2.8
One Nation	1. Rob Phillips; 2. Jim King	4,353	4.68	−4.6
Greens	1. Melanie Ross; 2. Charlotte McCabe	3,978	4.27	+0.2
Group D	1. June Mills; 2. Gary Meyerhoff	650	0.70	+0.70
Citizens Electoral Council	Peter Flynn	105	0.11	+0.11
Total formal votes		93,062	97.24	−0.76
Informal votes		1,901	2.76	+0.76
Turnout		95,702	86.20	−4.40

=== Elections in the 1990s ===
==== 1998 ====
Elected	#	Senator	Party
1998
1998	1	Trish Crossin	Labor
1998	2	Grant Tambling	CLP

1998 Australian federal election: Senate, Northern Territory
Party	Candidate	Votes	%	±%
Quota		31,001		
Labor	1. Trish Crossin (elected 1); 2. Charlie Phillips	38,259	41.2	−3.9
Country Liberal	1. Grant Tambling (elected 2); 2. Maisie Austin	36,063	38.8	−7.9
One Nation	1. Ted Hagger; 2. Dee Mills	8,657	9.3	+9.3
Democrats	1. Victor Edwards; 2. Peter Clements	5,119	5.5	+3.7
Greens	1. Lex Martin; 2. Andy Gough	4,232	4.5	−1.9
Independent	Jonathan Polke	672	0.7	+0.7
Total formal votes		93,002	98.0	+0.8
Informal votes		1,901	2.0	−0.8
Turnout		94,903	90.6	+1.4

==== 1996 ====
Elected	#	Senator	Party
1996
1996	1	Grant Tambling	Liberal
1996	2	Bob Collins	Labor

1996 Australian federal election: Senate, Northern Territory
Party	Candidate	Votes	%	±%
Quota		28,569		
Country Liberal	1. Grant Tambling (elected 1); 2. Kym Cook	40,050	46.7	+2.0
Labor	1. Bob Collins (elected 2); 2. Susan Bradley	38,667	45.1	−10.2
Greens	1. Margie Friel; 2. Ilana Eldridge	5,453	6.4	+6.4
Democrats	Geoff Carr	1,535	1.8	+1.8
Total formal votes		85,705	97.2	0.0
Informal votes		2,422	2.8	0.0
Turnout		88,127	89.2	+0.2

==== 1993 ====
Elected	#	Senator	Party
1993	1	Bob Collins	Labor
1993	2	Grant Tambling	CLP

1993 Australian federal election: Senate, Northern Territory
Party	Candidate	Votes	%	±%
Quota		26,382		
Labor	1. Bob Collins (elected 1); 2. Patty Ring	43,740	55.3	+1.0
Country Liberal	1. Grant Tambling (elected 2); 2. Bob Truman	35,405	44.7	+2.5
Total formal votes		79,145	97.2	0.0
Informal votes		2,312	2.8	0.0
Turnout		81,457	89.0	−0.5

==== 1990 ====
Elected	#	Senator	Party
1990
1990	1	Bob Collins	Labor
1990	2	Grant Tambling	CLP

1990 Australian federal election: Senate, Northern Territory
Party	Candidate	Votes	%	±%
Quota		22,908		
Labor	1. Bob Collins (elected 1); 2. Di Shanahan	37,343	54.3	+4.0
Country Liberal	1. Grant Tambling (elected 2); 2. Richard Lim	29,045	42.2	+9.7
Nuclear Disarmament	Citizen Limbo	1,197	1.7	+1.7
Independent	Ilana Eldridge	1,138	1.7	+1.7
Total formal votes		68,723	97.2	+0.9
Informal votes		1,977	2.8	−0.9
Turnout		70,700	89.5	+9.6

=== Elections in the 1980s ===
==== 1987 ====
1987 Australian federal election: Senate, Northern Territory
Party	Candidate	Votes	%	±%
Quota		20,506		
Labor	1. Bob Collins (elected 1); 2. Lyn Reid	30,872	50.2	+4.5
Country Liberal	1. Grant Tambling (elected 2); 2. Ian Towns	19,970	32.5	−16.6
NT Nationals	1. Jim Petrich; 2. Joan Small	8,892	14.5	+14.5
Group C	1. Lyn Allen; 2. Catherin Paul	1,632	2.7	+2.7
Independent	Yuri Juriev	151	0.2	+0.2
Total formal votes		61,517	96.3	−0.5
Informal votes		2,374	3.7	+0.5
Turnout		63,891	79.9	−5.6

#	Senator	Party
1	Bob Collins	Labor
2	Grant Tambling	CLP

==== 1984 ====
Elected	#	Senator	Party
1984
1984	1	Bernie Kilgariff	CLP
1984	2	Ted Robertson	Labor

1984 Australian federal election: Senate, Northern Territory
Party	Candidate	Votes	%	±%
Quota		19,004		
Country Liberal	1. Bernie Kilgariff (elected 1); 2. Patricia Davies	27,972	48.9	+0.8
Labor	1. Ted Robertson (elected 2); 2. Warren Snowdon	26,040	45.4	−0.6
Democrats	1. Betty Pearce; 2. Fay Lawrence	2,449	4.2	−1.1
Independent	Vincent Forrester	548	0.9	+0.9
Total formal votes		57,009	96.8	+1.5
Informal votes		1,862	3.2	−1.5
Turnout		58,871	85.5	+4.1

==== 1983 ====
1983 Australian federal election: Senate, Northern Territory
Party	Candidate	Votes	%	±%
Quota		14,826		
Country Liberal	1. Bernie Kilgariff (elected 1); 2. Dallas Drake	21,406	48.1	+2.6
Labor	1. Ted Robertson (elected 2); 2. Denise Fincham	20,467	46.0	+7.1
Democrats	Fay Lawrence	2,359	5.3	−4.5
Independent	Harold Brown	245	0.6	+0.6
Total formal votes		44,477	95.3	+2.6
Informal votes		2,186	4.7	−2.6
Turnout		46,663	81.4	−0.9

#	Senator	Party
1	Bernie Kilgariff	Country Liberal
2	Ted Robertson	Labor

==== 1980 ====
Elected	#	Senator	Party
1980
1980	1	Bernie Kilgariff	Country Liberal
1980	2	Ted Robertson	Labor

1980 Australian federal election: Senate, Northern Territory
Party	Candidate	Votes	%	±%
Quota		14,027		
Country Liberal	1. Bernard Kilgariff (elected 1); 2. Graeme Lewis	19,129	45.5	−0.5
Labor	1. Ted Robertson (elected 2); 2. Hunter Harrison	16,384	38.9	−1.5
Democrats	1. Jack Hunt; 2. William Evans	4,113	9.8	+1.6
Christian Democrat	1. Ronald Mann; 2. Charles Coombs	1,648	3.9	+3.9
Marijuana	1. Jennifer Smether; 2. Lance Lawrence	804	1.9	+1.9
Total formal votes		42,078	92.7	−0.8
Informal votes		3,325	7.3	+0.8
Turnout		45,403	82.3	+1.1

== See also ==
- List of senators from the Northern Territory
