= List of senators from the Northern Territory =

Northern Territory Australian Senate
- Created: 1975
- Party: Labor (1); Liberal (1) (Note: Jacinta Nampijinpa Price is a member of the Country Liberal Party and sits with the Liberal Party in federal parliament.)

The Northern Territory was first allowed to elect senators in 1975, following the amendment of the Senate (Representation of Territories) Act 1973. Northern Territory senators also represent Christmas Island and Cocos (Keeling) Islands.

== List ==
Parties	Number of elected Senators by party
Labor Party	5
CLP	5

Election	Senator (Party)	Senator (Party)
1975	Ted Robertson (Labor)	Bernie Kilgariff (Note: Member of the Country Liberal Party; sat with the parliamentary National Country Party until 8 March 1979 when he transferred to the parliamentary Liberal Party.) (National Country/ Liberal)
1977	Ted Robertson (Labor)	Bernie Kilgariff (National Country/ Liberal)
1979	Ted Robertson (Labor)	Bernie Kilgariff (National Country/ Liberal)
1980	Ted Robertson (Labor)	Bernie Kilgariff (National Country/ Liberal)
1983	Ted Robertson (Labor)	Bernie Kilgariff (National Country/ Liberal)
1984	Ted Robertson (Labor)	Bernie Kilgariff (National Country/ Liberal)
1987	Bob Collins (Labor)	Grant Tambling (Note: Member of the Country Liberal Party sitting with the parliamentary National Party.) (National)
1990	Bob Collins (Labor)	Grant Tambling (National)
1993	Bob Collins (Labor)	Grant Tambling (National)
1996	Bob Collins (Labor)	Grant Tambling (National)
1998	Trish Crossin (Labor)	Grant Tambling (National)
1998	Trish Crossin (Labor)	Grant Tambling (National)
2001	Trish Crossin (Labor)	Nigel Scullion (National)
2004	Trish Crossin (Labor)	Nigel Scullion (National)
2007	Trish Crossin (Labor)	Nigel Scullion (National)
2010	Trish Crossin (Labor)	Nigel Scullion (National)
2013	Nova Peris (Labor)	Nigel Scullion (National)
2016	Malarndirri McCarthy (Labor)	Nigel Scullion (National)
2019	Malarndirri McCarthy (Labor)	Sam McMahon (National/ Independent/ Liberal Democratic)
Jan 2022	Malarndirri McCarthy (Labor)	Sam McMahon (National/ Independent/ Liberal Democratic)
April 2022	Malarndirri McCarthy (Labor)	Sam McMahon (National/ Independent/ Liberal Democratic)
2022	Malarndirri McCarthy (Labor)	Jacinta Nampijinpa Price (Note: Member of the Country Liberal Party; sat with the parliamentary National Party until 8 May 2025 when she transferred to the parliamentary Liberal Party.) (National/Liberal)
2025	Malarndirri McCarthy (Labor)	Jacinta Nampijinpa Price (National/Liberal)
2025	Malarndirri McCarthy (Labor)	Jacinta Nampijinpa Price (National/Liberal)
