= Hugh Gordon (parasitologist) =

Australian veterinary scientist and parasitologist

Hugh Gordon jpg

Hugh McLeod Gordon AM, (28 March 1909 – 23 April 2002) was a pioneering Australian veterinary scientist and parasitologist.

Gordon had a long and distinguished career in veterinary research, becoming a world-renowned expert in the field of veterinary parasitology. Amongst his most important contributions in that field was the discovery that phenothiazine was a safe and effective anthelmintic in sheep and cattle. This discovery, along with the recognition that this compound could be manufactured locally, saved Australian sheep farmers millions of dollars.

== Early life ==
Hugh Gordon was born in Armidale, New South Wales, Australia to Hugh Hungerford Gordon (1883–1969) of Armidale; and Frederica Marion Taylor (1885–1962) of "Terrible Vale" Station, Kentucky, NSW. Hugh Hungerford (known as "Bob") was a grazier in the Armidale district of New South Wales, purchasing the property "Elsinore" in 1911.

Gordon spent his early years at Elsinore, attending Armidale High School from 1922 to 1926.

In 1927, Gordon entered the Faculty of Veterinary Science at the University of Sydney, residing at St. Paul's College. He applied for entry after reading a letter from Professor James Douglas Stewart, Dean of the Veterinary Science faculty, that appeared in the Sydney Morning Herald on 26 January 1927, asking country students to consider veterinary science as a career.

Gordon graduated with Honours in 1930 and was awarded the William Cooper & Nephews Prize for Parasitology, and the Baker and Ridley Memorial Prize for Animal Husbandry. He won the University Blues for hockey in 1928 and 1929.

== Marriage and children ==
Gordon married Rita Godfrey Killingley (1908–1996) of Balmain in 1937. They fell in love with Manly, settling there following marriage and spending their entire lives there. They had four children, Hugh McLeod (born 1938), David Dunvegan (born 1941), Ian Arthur (born 1943), and Anne Godfrey (born 1949).

At the time of his death, Gordon also had seven grandchildren and two great grandchildren. His eldest grandchild (son of Hugh McLeod), Adam Stewart Gordon (born 1967) graduated from the University of Sydney with an Honours degree in Veterinary Science in 1990. At his graduation, Adam wore the gown and hood that Gordon wore at his graduation in 1930.

== Career ==
=== Early career ===
Following graduation, Gordon was granted a Walter and Eliza Hall Fellowship to continue postgraduate studies in Veterinary Parasitology. From 1931 to 1933 he worked on parasitic diseases of sheep with Dr. (later Sir) Ian Clunies Ross at the McMaster Laboratory of the CSIRO located on the Camperdown campus of the University of Sydney.

His earliest research was incorporated in the groundbreaking publication (Clunies-Ross and Gordon) "The Internal Parasites and Parasitic Diseases of Sheep". This research came at a time when Australian woolgrowers were suffering enormous losses due to failure to identify parasites causing losses, lack of treatment, and limited knowledge of the factors leading to pasture infection.

=== University of Sydney ===
Gordon was a part-time lecturer in Veterinary Parasitology at the University of Sydney from 1937 until 1970. During this time he was responsible for teaching more than 1000 future veterinarians. Following his retirement from the CSIRO in 1974, he resumed teaching at the University of Sydney as a part-time demonstrator in Veterinary Parasitology. He continued in this role until 1996.

In 1968 he was awarded the Degree of Doctor of Veterinary Science from the University of Sydney for his thesis "Studies on Helminthosis in Sheep".

=== McMaster Laboratory, CSIRO ===
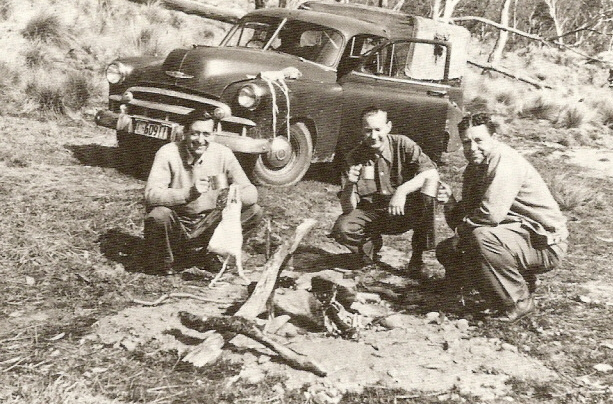
From left to right: Fred Hamilton, Harold Whitlock and Hugh Gordon on a parasitological field trip.

Gordon was appointed to the staff of the McMaster Laboratory in 1934, and remained there until his retirement in 1974. Gordon's time at the McMaster laboratory was marked by a prolific output of substantial papers, encompassing laboratory research and results from numerous field studies.

Gordon's major contribution was in laying the foundations of modern epidemiological thinking in the control of internal parasites of grazing ruminants, and sheep in particular. His understanding of the epidemiology of internal parasitism and parasitic diseases of sheep allowed him to develop control strategies that minimised reliance on drenching.

Dr Gordon's ideas were quickly recognised internationally, and in the 1960s and 70's he was frequently invited to make major contributions to International Veterinary Conferences and present invited specialist lectures in Europe, North and South America and South Africa.

The internationally recognised Wormkill program, which was most effective at controlling worms in the New England region of New South Wales in the 1980s, was based on principles developed by Gordon in the 1940s.

In addition to his epidemiological research, Gordon also researched and published extensively on the use of various anthelmintics in sheep. He was responsible for the discovery in the late 1930s of phenothiazine, a safe and effective anthelmintic. His research showed that this compound could effectively control intestinal parasites in sheep and cattle. This discovery, and local production of the required chemicals, resulted in a massive cut in the economic losses suffered by farmers due to intestinal parasitism. Phenothiazine was the mainstay of internal parasite control in sheep in Australia until the 1960s, when broad-spectrum anthelmintics became available.

Gordon also played a major role in the introduction of thiabendazole (a member of the benzimidazole family) as an anthelmintic for sheep in the early 1960s. In September 1961 in the journal Nature, he reported on his laboratory and field trials that demonstrated this compound exhibited a very high degree of anthelmintic activity against most of the major internal parasites of sheep.

Whilst the use of thiabendazole has waned, newer generation benzimidazole compounds such as albendazole and fenbendazole are to this day used widely in people and domestic animals.

=== Australian Veterinary Association ===
Hugh Gordon actively served the veterinary profession in many other roles. He was active in the affairs of the Australian Veterinary Association (AVA) at state and national level. He served the NSW division as secretary from 1933 to 1944 and president in 1941 and 1942. He was elected National President of the AVA in 1951. He also served as Honorary Librarian of the AVA's Max Henry Memorial Library from 1932 until 1990.

In recognition of his services to the Australian Veterinary Association, he was elected a Fellow. His Fellowship citation in 1959 stated that "through his work and writings, through the many students who have sat at his feet and by his willingness at all times to extend help and friendship to his colleagues, Mr. Gordon has attained a worldwide reputation both as a parasitologist and for his personal qualities".

== Retirement ==
Such was Gordon's dedication to veterinary science and parasitology, he continued to devote his time to these pursuits following his official retirement from the CSIRO in 1974. He continued to make his daily trek from Manly, taking the Manly Ferry then the 440 bus to the Camperdown campus of the University of Sydney.

He divided his time between the Veterinary Science faculty, where he was a demonstrator in parasitology practical classes, and the Max Henry Memorial Library, where he was Honorary Librarian. He continued to devour scientific journal articles on parasitology, keeping abreast of new developments and discoveries. In 1995 the Max Henry Memorial Library was disbanded much to Hugh's dismay. This marked the end of his time at the University of Sydney, 21 years after his official retirement and 64 years after he started at the McMaster Laboratory.

In "Hugh McLeod Gordon an appreciation on his 80th birthday", Alan D. Donald of the CSIRO wrote: "He has a truly enquiring mind, a constant capacity for lateral thinking, and an encyclopaedic knowledge of many things but of manners parasitological above all. At the same time, he has a gentle, self-effacing manner which has always made him instantly approachable by the most junior of his colleagues or students, and he has never been too busy to answer their requests for help or advice. These attributes, together with his origins, have also made him a highly effective communicator with the farming community who hold him in very high regard. His highly developed sense of humour, enormous mental storehouse of jokes, not all of them suitable for all occasions, and his skills as a raconteur, are widely known around the world."

Hugh McLeod Gordon died in Manly Hospital after a short illness on 23 April 2002.

== Honours ==
Throughout his career, Hugh Gordon was active in and honoured by many professional associations, both in Australia and overseas. These included:

- Australian Society for Parasitology; Foundation Member, President (1968–1969), elected Fellow 1972.
- World Association for the Advancement of Veterinary Parasitology; Foundation Member, former member of the Executive Board, First Vice-President, elected Honorary Member 1981.
- Helminthological Society of Washington; Elected Honorary Member 1981.
- Australian Veterinary Association; elected Fellow 1959, awarded Gilruth Prize in 1965.
- Australian College of Veterinary Scientists; Foundation Fellow and President 1976–1977.
- Australian and New Zealand Association for the Advancement of Science; President Section L (Veterinary Science), 1949.
- The Payne Exhibition, awarded for the "most important contribution to Veterinary Science during the preceding five years", 1958.
- Presented with the Order of the Golden Fleece by the California Wool Growers Association, 1970.
- Australian Sheep Veterinary Society established the Hugh Gordon Australian Sheep Veterinary Society Scholarship in his honour, first awarded 1998.
- University of Sydney inaugural Alumni Award for Achievement in Community Service, 1992. This award was created to honour graduates for excellence in their chosen field and outstanding community contributions.
- Appointed Member of the Order of Australia for Services to Veterinary Science, 1986.

== Publications ==
Hugh Gordon co-authored the definitive text "The Internal Parasites and Parasitic Diseases of Sheep" with Dr Ian Clunies Ross in 1936. He had in excess of 100 publications appear in various scientific journals, mostly the Australian Veterinary Journal.
