= Jacinta Nampijinpa Price =

Aboriginal Australian politician (born 1981)

Senator Jacinta Nampijinpa Price
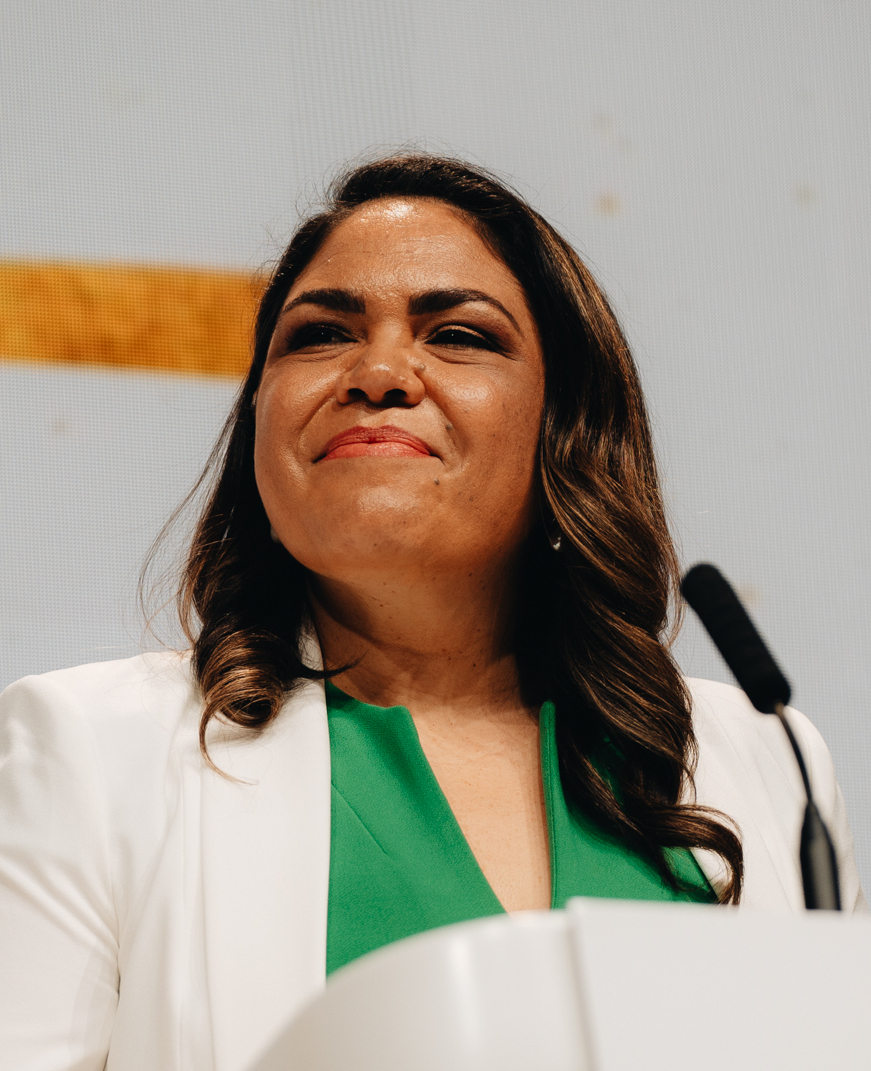
- Price in 2023

Shadow Minister for Small Business
- Incumbent
- Assumed office 17 February 2026
- Leader: Angus Taylor
- Preceded by: Tim Wilson

Shadow Minister for Skills and Training
- Incumbent
- Assumed office 17 February 2026
- Leader: Angus Taylor
- Preceded by: Scott Buchholz
Previous shadow ministerial offices
Shadow Minister for Defence Industry Shadow Minister for Defence Personnel
In office 28 May 2025 – 10 September 2025
Leader	Sussan Ley
Preceded by	Andrew Hastie
Succeeded by	Phillip Thompson
Shadow Minister for Government Efficiency
In office 25 January 2025 – 28 May 2025
Leader	Peter Dutton; Sussan Ley
Preceded by	Position established
Succeeded by	Position abolished
Shadow Minister for Indigenous Australians
In office 18 April 2023 – 28 May 2025
Leader	Peter Dutton; Sussan Ley
Preceded by	Julian Leeser
Succeeded by	Kerrynne Liddle

Senator for the Northern Territory
- Incumbent
- Assumed office 21 May 2022 Serving with Malarndirri McCarthy
- Preceded by: Sam McMahon
Local government offices
Mayor of Alice Springs
Acting; 7 August 2020 – 7 September 2020
Mayor	Damien Ryan
Deputy Mayor of Alice Springs
In office 29 September 2020 – 28 August 2021
Preceded by	Jamie DeBrenni
Succeeded by	Eli Melky
Councillor for the Town of Alice Springs
In office 10 October 2015 – 28 August 2023
Preceded by	Liz Martin
Succeeded by	Michael Liddle

Personal details
- Born: Jacinta Suzette Yangapi Nampijinpa Price; 12 May 1981 (age 45) Darwin, Northern Territory, Australia
- Party: Country Liberal
- Other political affiliations: Liberal (since 2025); National (2022–2025)
- Spouse: Colin Lillie
- Relations: Bess Price (mother); Karl Hampton (cousin)
- Children: 3, 1 step-child
- Website: Official website

Jacinta Suzette Yangapi Nampijinpa Price (Warlpiri pronunciation: [jaŋabi nambiɟ̊inba]; born 12 May 1981) is an Aboriginal Australian politician. She is of Irish, Scottish and Warlpiri descent. She has been a senator for the Northern Territory since the 2022 federal election. She is a member of the Country Liberal Party, a conservative party operating in the Northern Territory and affiliated with the Liberal–National Coalition on a federal level. Since May 2025, she has sat with the Liberal Party in federal parliament, having formerly sat with the Nationals. She was the shadow defence minister until September 2025. She then returned to the shadow cabinet after the 2026 Liberal Party of Australia leadership spill as part of the Taylor shadow ministry.

After a career as an entertainer singing, songwriting and hosting a Yamba Playtime children's program on Imparja TV, Price was elected to the Alice Springs Town Council in a by-election in October 2015, with her swearing-in overseen by her mother, then the NT Minister for Local Government. In the 2019 federal election, she unsuccessfully stood for the Country Liberal Party in the Division of Lingiari. She later worked for right-wing lobby group Advance and wrote opinion pieces for media owned by News Corp.

Price's activism and views focus primarily on issues faced by Aboriginal communities include domestic violence, herself being a victim, and she is a vocal advocate for conservative politics in Australia, appearing frequently on Sky News Australia. She has also received significant donations from Gina Rinehart and been described by Lachlan Murdoch as 'a beacon of light in a sea of woke darkness'. She has highlighted the high rates of domestic and other violence in Aboriginal communities, and advocates for a harder law and order approach. She is critical of welfare dependency and what she describes as "opportunistic collectivism". She opposed the proposed Indigenous Voice to Parliament, and believes that calls to change Australia Day and the Australian flag are counterproductive to Aboriginal advancement. Price has also been critical of alleged mass migration from India.

== Early life ==
Price was born on 12 May 1981 in Darwin, Northern Territory, and grew up in Alice Springs. Her father, David Price, is of Anglo-Celtic descent and was born in Newcastle, New South Wales. Her mother, Bess Price, who served in the Northern Territory Legislative Assembly, is a Warlpiri woman. Her parents met in Yuendumu in 1976, working at the local school; David as a teacher in the bilingual program, while Bess was 15–16 years old, producing Warlpiri literacy materials.

Bess Price is a fellow member of the CLP, who served as a minister in the Adam Giles NT Government, holding portfolios including housing and statehood, and was a vocal supporter of the Howard government's 2007 Northern Territory Intervention, that implemented new legislation in response to the crises facing Aboriginal communities.

Price's older half brother, Leonard/Linawu, died of cancer when he was 10.

Price has written that her mother was "born under a tree and lived within an original Warlpiri structured environment through a kinship system on Aboriginal land. Her first language was Warlpiri, and her parents, my grandparents, only came into contact with white settlers in their early adolescence in the 1940s."

She travelled widely with her family as a child, camping in the bush on swags. By the age of seven she had visited every Australian state and, by 12, had travelled around the world.

In Year 12, she gave birth to her first son.

=== TV and musical career ===
Price is a NAIDOC Award-winning singer, songwriter and recording artist. As a child, she learned the violin before joining local hip-hop groups Flava 4 and C-Mobs. She began performing rap and hip-hop on stage with her cousins around the age of 15. In 2001, she was chosen to sing the national anthem for the Yeperenye Federation Festival. She was a member of the Alice Springs trio Catch the Fly, who wrote and performed songs about "friendship and the silliness that comes with friendship, and the poking fun at one another and laughing at ourselves". In Catch the Fly, Price adopted the persona of a "sexy, sassy, rap hip-hop chick" by the name of "Sassy J".

In 2013, she released her first music album Dry River, a mix of folk, soul and country music, paying tribute to her life growing up in Central Australia. Triple J likened her sound to that of Tracy Chapman, while Land Rights News described her sound as a blend of folk, blues and country which "reflects her Aboriginal/Celtic heritage". The album was produced by Bill Chambers and Price's husband Colin Lillie. Within the music industry, Price developed the Desert Divas program, which nurtures female Indigenous musical talent.

Price also had a TV career in the children's television program, Yamba's Playtime, where she played the best friend of the lead character Yamba the Honey Ant. Price is in addition a regular guest on Sky News Australia.

== Entry into politics ==
=== Alice Springs Council (2015–2021) ===
Price was elected as a councillor on the Alice Springs Town Council at a by-election in October 2015. At her swearing in to the Alice Springs council in 2015, Price's mother Bess Price officiated, as NT Minister for Local Government.

Price shared a close relationship with fellow councillor Jamie di Brenni, and agreed with him on most issues. She said in a 2017 interview that her values aligned with generally "with the old white fellas" on the council; however, she was against fracking as there is a potential risk to water sources from this practice. Price said that council had not done enough to combat the disproportionate amount of violence against women seen in Alice Springs, and she would like to see more campaigning on the issue. She had called a forum with women, including town camp residents, to discuss community needs and antisocial behaviour. She had also worked with the council's Youth Action Group, and had championed recreational and creative opportunities for youth in the town.

Price was the top scoring councillor candidate at the 2017 Alice Springs local government election, and stated at the time that she was committed to the Alice Springs Town Council, however six months into her four-year term, she announced she was seeking endorsement to be the CLP candidate for the Division of Lingiari at the upcoming 2019 Australian federal election. She became the Deputy Mayor of Alice Springs in September 2020. She served until August 2021, when she did not stand for re-election as a councillor.

=== 2019 federal election candidate ===
Price stood unsuccessfully, as the Country Liberal Party candidate, for the Division of Lingiari at the 2019 federal election. She secured 44.54 percent of the two-party preferred vote against long-serving Labor incumbent Warren Snowdon, to his 55.46 percent.

In January of that year, Greens Lingiari candidate George Hanna, who is also indigenous, had shared a meme about Price, referring to her as a "coconut", a metaphor for someone of indigenous background who is attuned more to white cultural norms and values than those of native culture: like a coconut "white on the inside". Price described the post as despicable and racist, and called for the Greens to disendorse Hanna, but the Greens refused. Aboriginal activist Steve Hodder Watt accused Price of hypocrisy, and published messages in which Price referred to him as "white".

Price was also criticised over a video of an Al Jazeera video which she had posted to her Facebook page in 2014, and which had featured a critique of violence in Islam by writer-psychiatrist Wafa Sultan, a Syrian-American ex-Muslim. The Australian National Imams Council called the video Islamophobic. In response, a CLP spokesperson told the ABC News that her motivation for sharing the video was part of her long campaign against the use of religion or culture to justify violence against women.

== Senator for the Northern Territory (2022–present) ==
Price became a Senator for the Northern Territory at the 2022 federal election, replacing Sam McMahon, whom she defeated for preselection in June 2021. She was pre-selected in the Country Liberal Party's number one Senate ticket position for the election, and successfully won the second of two seats alongside Labor's Malarndirri McCarthy. As a senator elected from a territory, Price's term commenced immediately, as opposed to senators elected from the states, whose terms are fixed to start from 1 July.

=== Maiden speech ===
Price delivered her first speech in the Senate on 27 July 2022. Prior to making the address, she took part in a traditional ceremony with her grandmother handing her a nulla-nulla hunting stick sourced from her Country. "The ceremony was telling the story about Jukurrpa, which is Dreaming relating to our family", Price said. "Passing on through this nulla-nulla the authority to me to speak on behalf of our area." Wearing traditional headdress for her maiden speech, she then outlined her priorities for office, citing housing, women's safety and economic development as key concerns. The Age reported that Price made an "impassioned plea against 'false narratives' of racism and [called] the push for an Indigenous Voice to Parliament a symbolic gesture that could divide black and white Australia". Price called for a restoration of law and order in remote communities to combat the scourge of violence:

My vision, my hope, my goal, is that we can effect change that will see women, children and other victims in these communities become as safe as any of those living in Sydney, Melbourne or any other Australian city. My goal is to halt the pointless virtue signalling and focus on solutions that brings real change that changes the lives of Australia's most vulnerable citizens. Solutions that give them real lives, not the enduring nightmare of violence and terror they currently live. It is not good enough that the streets of our Northern Territory towns — and other towns across regional Australia — have gangs of children aged from 6 to 16 wandering around with no adult supervision in the early hours of the morning. It is not good enough that almost all of these children have witnessed or been subject to normalised alcohol abuse, domestic, family and sexual violence throughout their young lives and is the reason for their presence on our streets. Such neglect in great numbers would not be accepted in the prosperous suburbs of any of our capital cities.

— Jacinta Price, maiden speech to the Senate.

Price invoked the legacy of the first Aboriginal Senator Neville Bonner to criticise welfare dependency and "opportunistic collectivism" as barriers to Aboriginal advancement:

Like my distinguished predecessor Senator Neville Bonner, I believe free enterprise coupled with sound fiscal management in a progressive commercial environment forms the basis for economic independence. In other words, business and jobs are the key to economic health for a community, not the shackles of welfare dependency. Under the current Land Rights Act, coupled with growing welfare dependency, this environment has not had the opportunity to materialise... The intent of the Act was to provide access to conduct traditional activity and provide opportunity for economic use. But despite traditional owners having around 45% of NT land mass and 80% of the NT coastline under the Act, and it serving over 30% of the NT population, it has failed to deliver economic independence or generate employment opportunities. Traditional Owners have been left to pick the lock that the layers of gatekeepers have so welded around the Act ... It is a constant cycle of Indigenous Industry gravy train consumers, in a static system that gathers under the banner of 'opportunistic collectivism'.

— Jacinta Price, maiden speech to the Senate

Indigenous leader and politician Warren Mundine called the address the "greatest speech" he'd heard in parliament. Journalist Greg Sheridan called it "magnificent... a kind of Australian Gettysburg Address that should be read by all Australians". The Age newspaper called the speech a "red flag for Albanese" on the Indigenous Voice issue.

=== Shadow minister (2023–2025) ===
Price was appointed the Shadow Minister for Indigenous Australians in the Dutton shadow ministry on 18 April 2023. The prospect of her becoming Minister for Indigenous Australians had been viewed with concern by left-wing Indigenous activists.

In early 2025, Price was appointed the Minister for Government Efficiency, a new portfolio based on the United States' Department of Government Efficiency.

After Sussan Ley became leader, the government efficiency portfolio was abolished and Price was replaced as Indigenous Minister by Kerrynne Liddle. Price was appointed the Minister for Defence Industry and Personnel.

In September 2025, after Price made comments about Indian-Australians voting predominantly for Labor, she was stood down from the shadow ministry.

==== Leaving the Nationals ====
In federal parliament, Price sat in the National Party room upon becoming a senator, but switched to sitting in the Liberal Party room in May 2025, saying that the Liberals were her "natural home". CLP senators normally sit in the National party room, since the CLP has full voting rights with the Nationals and observer status with the Liberals.

Price announced on 11 May that she would contest the Liberal deputy leadership election. She endorsed Angus Taylor's run for the leadership, saying that the Liberals needed to stand for "forgotten people." Her decision to defect was criticised by National senators Matt Canavan and Bridget McKenzie. Ultimately, following Taylor's loss to Sussan Ley for the leadership, Price did not contest the deputy leadership, won by Queensland MP Ted O'Brien. Former prime minister Tony Abbott was instrumental in encouraging Price to run for the deputy leadership. He thought it would energise the party's base.

=== Financial Disclosures ===
Price has reportedly had to refund improperly claimed parliamentary expenses, totalling almost $11,000, on 13 occasions. In 2022, Price was criticized for delays in declaring gifts, including free flights and accommodation from groups like Advance Australia and CPAC, which were not registered until May 2023.

=== Return to Shadow Ministry (2026–present) ===
Price was appointed to the shadow cabinet as part of the Taylor shadow ministry, holding the portfoilos as Shadow Minister for Skills and Training and Shadow Minister for Small Business.

== Political positions and activism ==
Price's activism primarily focuses on issues faced by Aboriginal communities.

=== Aboriginal autonomy ===
Price generally takes a conservative view towards issues facing Aboriginal communities. Price has criticised what she terms "paternalistic" approaches to Aboriginal autonomy. She advocates for law and order, racial equality before the law, and an end to welfare dependency and what she calls an "opportunistic collectivism" in Indigenous policy.

Price criticised former Australian Labor Party leader Bill Shorten for paternalism during his visit to Barunga in 2018.

=== Crime in Aboriginal communities ===
Price has highlighted the high rates of domestic and other violence in Aboriginal communities. She advocates for law and order, and racial equality before the law. She rejects the notion of white privilege, and has criticised left-wing public discourse around Indigenous deaths due to violence and, in particular, Aboriginal deaths in custody. In her maiden speech, Price rejected the idea of racism causing Aboriginal deaths in custody as a "false narrative", and told Parliament: "We cannot support legislation that prioritises freedom of the perpetrator over justice for the victim, in an attempt to reduce rates of incarceration."

Price rejects claims of systemic racism in the Australian prison system against Aboriginal people, citing the finding of the Royal Commission into Aboriginal Deaths in Custody (1987–1991) that there was no evidence that proportionately more Aboriginal Australians die in custody than non-Indigenous Australians. In her maiden speech, Price said "Our greatest problem lies with the fact that in the [30 years after the Royal Commission], over 750 Indigenous Australians were murdered at the hands of other Indigenous Australians — yet there is little concern or acknowledgment that this is why Indigenous Australians are incarcerated at such high rates."

Following a June 2020 Black Lives Matter protest in Melbourne, Price accused protesters of being ignorant and uncaring, stating: "70 percent of Aboriginal men and women incarcerated are incarcerated for acts of violence against their loved ones. [The Left] don't care because the perpetrators are also black, people only care if there is seen to be a white perpetrator. It's not racism that is killing our people, it is the actions of our own people". She argued that Black Lives Matter activists have been "ignoring the real crisis" facing Indigenous people.

=== Australia Day debate ===
Price thinks that calls to change Australia Day and the Australian flag are counterproductive to Aboriginal advancement.

In 2018, Price supported the "Save Australia Day" campaign promoted by One Nation politician Mark Latham. In 2021, she again criticised the push to change the date of Australia Day, saying that changing the date would not improve the lives of Aboriginal people. Price described Australia Day as a "magical day" and rejected claims that the day commemorates the subjugation of Aboriginal people.

=== Indigenous welfare policies ===
Price has been a vocal supporter of alcohol restrictions in remote Aboriginal communities and the cashless debit card, and criticised the Labor government for overturning these welfare policies. In her maiden speech, she said the overturning of grog bans would allow alcoholism and accompanying violence to flourish, while the cashless welfare card had improved the lives of many families on welfare, who could "feed their children rather than seeing their money claimed by kinship demand from alcoholics, substance abusers and gamblers". In August 2022, she called for urgent action on the alcohol crisis in remote communities.

=== Voice to Parliament ===
Price opposed the Albanese government's proposal for a referendum to enshrine an Indigenous Voice to Parliament within the Australian Constitution on the grounds that it would be a racially divisive bureaucracy that couldn't be dismantled, that it would set Indigenous and non-Indigenous people on an unequal footing, and would imply that Aboriginal people are a "separate entity to the rest of Australia". Noting her objections to the Voice, Aboriginal journalist Stan Grant told the ABC's Insiders program on 31 July 2022 that Price will be "a significant and important voice on [the issue] and clearly others in the Coalition Opposition have gathered around her..."

In her maiden speech, Price told Parliament that the Labor government was "yet to demonstrate how this proposed Voice will deliver practical outcomes and unite rather than drive a wedge further between Indigenous and non-Indigenous Australia". In a 2022 book entitled Beyond Belief... Rethinking the Voice to Parliament, Price wrote: "The globally unprecedented Voice proposal will divide Australia along racial lines... It will constitutionally enshrine the idea that Aboriginal people are perpetual victims – forever in need of special measures."

In November 2022, Price spoke to the media alongside Nationals leader David Littleproud to support the party's formal announcement of opposition to the Voice, telling reporters, "What we need now is practical measures and we have to stop dividing our nation along the lines of race."

==== "No" campaign ====
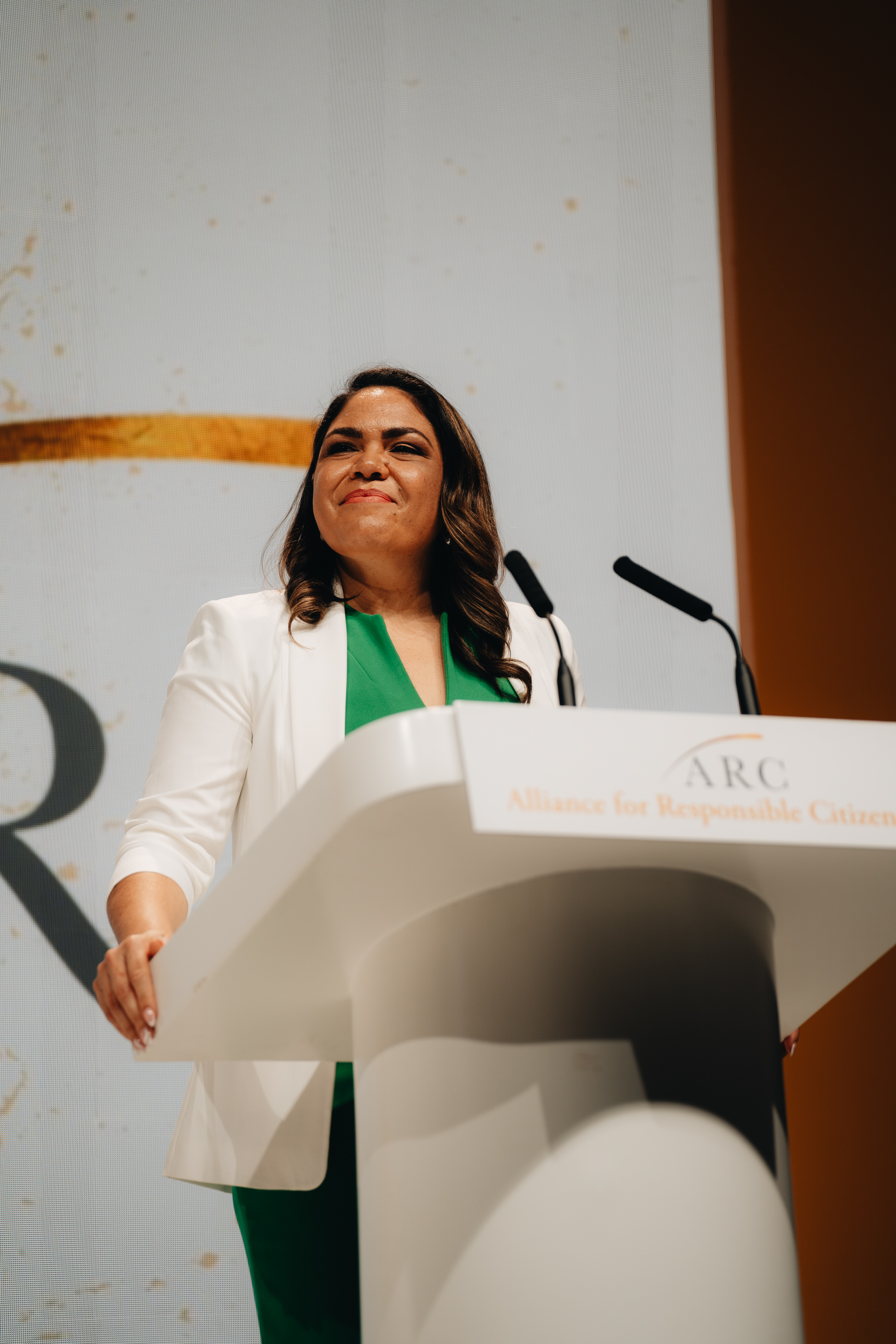
Jacinta Nampijinpa Price speaking at the Alliance for Responsible Citizenship, London, October 2023.

Price fronted the "No to Voice" campaign. She, along with her Scottish husband, featured in an advertisement that talked about her life, and her upbringing in Alice Springs, and advocated for people to vote against a "race-based referendum". In the advertisement, she said she did not want her family to be divided along the lines of race. In a Sky News interview, she called the Indigenous Voice to Parliament a "bureaucratic structure which I think is divisive and dangerous and undermines democracy as we know it", but mentioned she supports the recognition of Indigenous Australians in the constitution. The Australian electorate voted against the proposal 60% to 40%.

Three weeks later, in a keynote speech to the Alliance for Responsible Citizenship in London, Price described the outcome of the referendum as a turning point in the fight against identity politics:

They tried to teach everyday Australians that we belong to a racist country, tried to teach our children that they shouldn't be proud to call themselves Australian, tried to suggest that if you voted No that you belonged to the wrong side of history – well, we showed them.

A correspondent from The Sydney Morning Herald said that Price received a standing ovation. In an interview on the sidelines of the conference she mentioned that several European diplomats had wondered why Australia had even considered creating division along lines of race.

=== 'Make Australia Great Again' ===
During a campaign rally in Perth on 12 April 2025, Price said she wanted to "make Australia great again". When asked during a press conference if this was a nod to the "Make America Great Again" slogan used extensively by US president Donald Trump and the broader MAGA movement, Price claimed she "hadn't realised" what she had said. National Party leader David Littleproud called Price's phrasing a "slip of the tongue".

However, one day later, The Guardian obtained a photo shared on Price's Facebook page that showed her and her husband Colin Lillie each wearing "Make America Great Again" baseball caps while Price also held a Donald Trump Christmas tree ornament. In response, Price claimed the picture to be "a stunt" and a "joke in her family", and criticised reporters for digging through her private social media.

In a heated election interview on the night of the 2025 Australian federal election, Price again distanced herself from the 'Make Australia Great Again' slogan after questions were put to her by Sarah Ferguson, on whether she was partly responsible for the Liberal Party's shock landslide loss, and Liberal leader Peter Dutton's defeat in his own seat of Dickson. Price angrily rebuked Ferguson accusing her and the media of 'mud-slinging', 'smearing' and "misleading the Australian people", then repeated allegations of significant wrongdoing first raised by incumbent Labor MP Marion Scrymgour.

Scrymgour alleged that Aboriginal women in unspecified remote communities were targeted "by interstate volunteers for the Liberal Party" and that "men were standing over them". Price urged the ABC to "send an investigative journalist out" to investigate the allegations, suggesting that the Australian Electoral Commission (AEC) had been repeatedly alerted to the allegations, also accusing the AEC of 'doing very little' to investigate the allegations. Despite echoing allegations of Liberal Party wrongdoing, Price joined the Liberal Party several days later on 8 May 2025.

In a statement the AEC refuted the claims of inaction, noting that it had not observed wrongdoing of the nature Price had described, and had said that it had not received a specific complaint from Scrymgour. The day after the election an AEC spokesperson stated that the commission had not received any complaints or referrals from Price during the campaign. Price's allegations echo similar comments she made in 2023 alleging electoral misconduct around the Indigenous Voice to Parliament referendum. Some journalists have noted that whilst allegations of electoral fraud have become a major part of U.S. politics, they have generally remained in the periphery of Australian politics.

=== Immigration ===
On 3 September 2025, Price claimed in an interview that the Labor government was giving preference to immigrants from particular countries, specifically India, expecting them to be likely to vote Labor. Price soon afterwards retracted this claim, acknowledging that Australian immigration law does not permit ethnic preference.

Her party leader, Sussan Ley, affirmed the party's respect for Indian-Australians and commitment to a non-discriminatory immigration policy, and said that Price had made an amendment, but Price stated: "I don't believe I have anything to apologise about." After calls from Indian-Australians for an apology, as well as a split opinion within the parliamentary Liberal Party, shadow federal attorney-general Julian Leeser made an 'unreserved' apology to Indian-Australians in his constituency.

On 10 September, she was removed from the shadow ministry by Liberal leader Sussan Ley after refusing to apologise for these comments and refusing to support Ley's leadership. Ley was eventually deposed in February 2026 after a leadership spill was won by Angus Taylor.

== Awards and recognition ==
Price was presented with the inaugural Freedom and Hope Award at the Australian Conservative Political Action Conference held in Sydney in October 2022. Crikey described her as "the breakout star" of the event.

During her artistic career, Price was named Artist of the Year at the NAIDOC Awards in 2011, and was nominated for Most Promising New Talent in Music in the 2012 Deadly Awards. Her album Dry River, was a finalist in the folk category for the NT Song of the Year Awards in 2012.

== Legal proceedings ==
Price launched defamation proceedings against the Australian Broadcasting Corporation in 2019 in response to its coverage of her "Mind the Gap" tour. She received a full public apology for "false and defamatory" material in April 2021.

In 2020, Price was sued for defamation by Nova Peris, former federal government senator for the NT, who is also Aboriginal. Price had accused Peris of protecting sexual predators while on the television program Studio 10. According to transcripts provided by the Supreme Court of Victoria, Price stated that Peris had been involved with "powerful men who have made it to powerful positions who have never been condemned". Price later apologised to Peris for these remarks.

In August 2022, journalist Peter FitzSimons threatened to sue Price for defamation when she complained that he had been rude and aggressive in a telephone interview. Price urged FitzSimons and his newspaper, The Sydney Morning Herald, to release the recording of the interview but they declined to do so.

== Personal life ==
Price has three sons from a first marriage, including one with whom she became pregnant as a teenager. She experienced domestic violence in a later relationship; after a lamp was thrown at her head, she required six stitches, and believed that if she returned to the relationship "he [would] kill me". By 2008 she had met Colin Lillie, a Scottish-Australian singer and songwriter, whom she married in a traditional ceremony before being married under Australian law. Price is a stepmother to Lillie's son from a previous relationship.

Outside of elected office, Price served as Indigenous program director for the Centre for Independent Studies, a libertarian think tank based in Sydney. Her January 2021 paper, Worlds Apart: Remote Indigenous disadvantage in the context of wider Australia, surveyed the statistics on third-world conditions and extreme levels of violence in remote communities.
