= Australian Veterinary Association =

Australian professional association

The Australian Veterinary Association (AVA) is a not-for-profit association representing more than 7000 Australian veterinarians working in private practice, government, industry, and academia. The AVA was mooted before the First World War but not founded until 1921. The nineteenth century predecessor organisation was the Australasian Veterinary Medical Association.

Prominent veterinarians who have been members of the Australian Veterinary Association include Professor J.D. Stewart (who was the first AVA President), Ian Clunies Ross (former head of the CSIRO), and parasitologist Hugh Gordon.

The AVA provides information resources, continuing education opportunities, publications, public education programs, and professional support. The AVA also advocates for the profession to government on a number of fronts. Special interest groups (SIGs) have existed within the AVA since the early 1960s. These include groups dedicated to equine medicine, cattle, practice management, avian health, sheep, conservation and animal welfare. Some of the special interest groups publish their own peer reviewed journals. The Australian Veterinary History Society is a division of the association. Recent lobbying efforts include, HECS debt relief for rural veterinarians, mental health awareness in the veterinary profession, advocating for veterinarians as essential services during the COVID-19 pandemic and research into the deadly Hendra Virus.

The AVA has published the Australian Veterinary Journal since 1925.

== Past and current presidents ==
- 2026–present: Dr Diana Barker
- 2025–2026: Dr Gemma Chuck
- 2024–2025: Dr Sally Colgan
- 2023–2024: Dr Diana Barker
- 2023: Dr Alistair Webb (resigned August 2023)
- 2022–2023: Dr Bronwyn Orr
- 2020–2022: Dr Warwick Vale
- 2019–2020: Dr Julia Crawford
- 2017–2019: Dr Paula Parker
- 2015–2017: Dr Robert Johnson
- 2012–2014: Dr Ben Gardiner
- 2010–2012: Dr Barry Smyth
- 2008–2010: Dr Mark Lawrie
- 2007–2008: Dr Dianne Sheehan
- 2006–2007: Dr Kersti Seksel
- 2005–2006: Dr Matt Makin
- 2004–2005: Dr Norm Blackman
- 2002–2003: Dr Joanne Sillince
- 2001–2002: Dr Robert Baker
- 2000–2001: Dr Ian Denney
- 1999–2000: Dr Garth McGilvray
- 1998–1999: Dr Geoffrey Niethe
- 1997–1998: Dr Roger Clarke
- 1996–1997: Dr Bill Scanlan
- 1995–1996: Dr Pamela Scanlon
- 1994–1995: Dr Michael Banyard
- 1993–1994: Dr Jakob Malmo
- 1991–1992: Dr John Plant
- 1989–1990: Dr Ian Fairnie
- 1988–1989: Professor Mary Barton
- 1987–1988: Dr Russell Duigan
- 1986–1987: Dr Terence Collins
- 1985–1986: Dr David Lindsay
- 1983–1984: Dr Jack Arundel
- 1982–1983: Dr Helen Jones
- 1981–1982: Dr Bryan Woolcock
- 1980–1981: Dr William Pryor
- 1978–1979: Dr Ian Pearson
- 1966–1967: Dr Bruce Eastick

== Past notable board members ==
- Sam McMahon, an Australian politician for the Country Liberal Party and a Senator for the Northern Territory in the Parliament of Australia in 2019, served on the board from 2004-2009.
