= Libertarian Party (Australia) =

Australian political party

- Abbreviation: LP; LBT
- President: Anthony Bull
- Registered Officer (AEC): Robert McCathie
- Founder: John Humphreys
- Founded: 2001; 25 years ago
- Registered: 2007 (as LDP); 2024 (as Libertarian Party)
- Headquarters: Docklands, Melbourne, Victoria
- Ideology: Right-libertarianism; Conservatism (Australian); Classical liberalism
- Political position: Right-wing
- Colours: Burgundy; Yellow
- House of Representatives: 0 / 150
- Senate: 0 / 76
- New South Wales Legislative Council: 1 / 42
- Victorian Legislative Council: 1 / 40
- Local government councillors (NSW): 10 / 1,480
- Local government councillors (Vic): 2 / 656

Website
- www.libertarians.org.au

The Libertarian Party (LP), formerly known as the Liberal Democratic Party (LDP), is an Australian political party founded in Canberra in 2001. The party espouses smaller government and a philosophy stated in 2013 to be "broadly described as classical liberal or libertarian", such as lower taxes, decentralisation, uranium mining, opposing restrictions on civil liberties, and the relaxation of smoking laws. The party is also socially conservative.

As of February 2025, the party is registered in the Australian Capital Territory, New South Wales, Queensland, South Australia, Victoria, and Western Australia as well as for federal elections with the Australian Electoral Commission (AEC).

== History ==
=== Formation ===
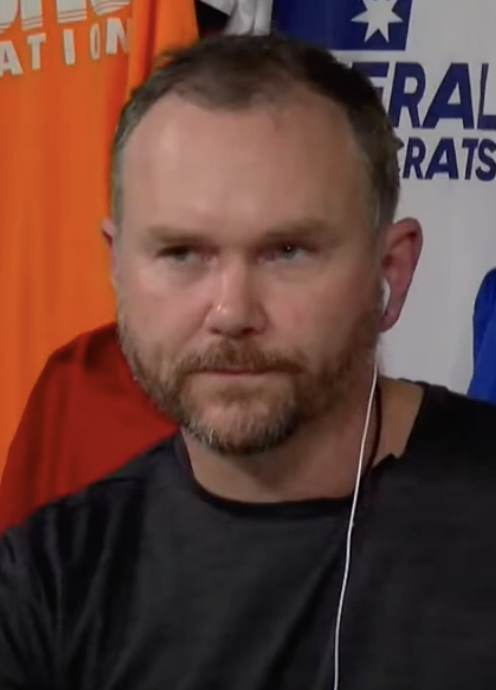
Liberal Democratic Party founder John Humphreys

The Liberal Democratic Party was founded in 2001 as a political party registered in the Australian Capital Territory. It first contested elections in the 2001 ACT election, receiving 1 percent of the vote. The party also contested the 2004 ACT election, receiving 1.3 percent of the vote.

In 2006, changes to the Electoral Act by the Howard government forced all parties without parliamentary representation to deregister and re-register under stricter naming rules. Advised by the Australian Electoral Commission that federal registration under the original name was uncertain given opposition by the Liberal Party of Australia, the party chose to register federally as the Liberty and Democracy Party in 2007. The Liberty and Democracy Party contested 2007 federal election, winning 17,048 votes (0.14 percent) in the lower house and 16,942 votes (0.13 percent) in the upper house.

In 2008, the party successfully applied to the Australian Electoral Commission to change its federally registered name to Liberal Democratic Party. During this period, the party remained registered under its original name in the Australian Capital Territory (ACT).

=== Initial electoral contests ===
Party logo used briefly between 2021 and 2022

In 2010, the party contested the 2010 federal election, receiving 1.8 percent of the national senate vote and an average of 1.3 percent across the 21 lower house seats it contested, with a best of 5.52 percent in Gippsland.

In 2012, the Liberal Democratic Party had its first successful election win. Jeff Pettett was elected as a Councillor to the Ku-ring-gai Council in northern metropolitan Sydney at the New South Wales local government elections, gaining 24 per cent of vote in the absence of Liberal Party candidates. Clinton Mead was elected as a Councillor to the Campbelltown Council in southern metropolitan Sydney at the New South Wales local government elections.

Prior to the 2012 Ramsay and Port Adelaide state by-elections in South Australia, the polls in The Advertiser newspaper gave the LDP 23 percent and 14 percent of the vote respectively in the absence of Liberal Party candidates. The LDP ended up with votes of 13.3 percent and 7.3 percent respectively. The paper described the LDP as "a hardline liberal party that demands abolition of government welfare as well as the minimum wage, seatbelts and bike helmets. It backs legalisation of marijuana and increased freedom to access pornography".

At the 2013 federal election, LDP candidate David Leyonhjelm was elected to the Senate after polling the third highest vote in the state of New South Wales after the Liberal Party of Australia and the Australian Labor Party. According to Leyonhjelm, a portion of their vote probably came from their 'first position' on the long senate ballot paper and voters potentially being confused with his party and other contesting parties such as the Liberals, the Australian Democrats and the Christian Democratic Party. However, Leyonhjelm points to the fact that the Liberal Democrats' vote in South Australia, where they were fifth on the ballot, rose 3 percentage points. He also points to the fact that the donkey vote generally only produces swings of +1 or 2 percentage points to the party listed first on the ballot. Leyonhjelm organised preferences for several different, but closely entwined, political parties seeking election to the Senate, including the Outdoor Recreation Party, Smokers' Rights Party and the Republican Party of Australia. Australian Sex Party candidate Fiona Patten alleged Leyonhjelm intentionally failed to lodge ticket voting preferences forms, reneging on a preference deal, but Leyonhjelm claimed that there was a mistake entering the AEC fax number. The Liberal Democrats were not involved in Glenn Druery's Minor Party Alliance during the election which assisted in negotiating preference flows between minor parties. On 1 July 2014, David Leyonhjelm became the Liberal Democratic Party's first senator.

Shortly after David Leyonhjelm's Senate victory, Liberal Democrats councillor Clinton Mead was elected Mayor of the City of Campbelltown in New South Wales.

In 2015, the Liberal Democrats registered with the Victorian Electoral Commission (VEC), and announced it would field upper-house candidates in the upcoming Victorian state election on 29 November 2014. In 2016, the Liberal Party sought to challenge the name of the party with the electoral commission, but ultimately abandoned the action.

David Leyonhjelm was re-elected with a 3.1 percent (−6.4) primary vote, or 139,000 votes, at the 2016 double dissolution federal election. Gabriel Buckley, the LDP's lead candidate in Queensland, marginally misses out on a seat.

WA elections were held 11 March 2017, where the state's first LDP member, Aaron Stonehouse, was elected.

In May 2017, former Leader of the Opposition and political commentator Mark Latham left the Australian Labor Party and joined the LDP.

In 2018, candidates Tim Quilty and David Limbrick were elected to the Victorian Legislative Council (state upper house). In the same year, Mark Latham left the party to become the leader of One Nation NSW division.

In 2019, David Leyonhjelm announced that he will be quitting federal parliament in order to contest the New South Wales state election. This resulted in Duncan Spender being sworn in to fill Leyonhjelm's former seat until the next Federal election. David Leyonhjelm did not get elected in the 2019 New South Wales election, securing only 0.46 of a seat quota. Duncan Spender also lost their Senate seat in the 2019 election.

In the 2020 Victorian local elections, the party fielded 11 candidates state-wide. Two endorsed candidates were elected, Olga Quilty in Wodonga with a 5.83% first preference vote against 18 other candidates and Paul Barker in Torquay with a 11.67% first preference vote against nine other candidates.

=== Recent developments ===
On 18 May 2017, the Liberal Democratic Party formed a 'conservative bloc' with One Nation and the Shooters, Fishers and Farmers Party in the Western Australia Legislative Council.

High Court challenge by John Ruddick bought on by the Liberal party consequential to legislative changes to prevent 'voter confusion' specifically with the 'Liberal Democrats'.

During the COVID-19 pandemic, Victorian MPs Quilty and Limbrick became outspoken critics of the Victorian Parliament, the Federal Parliament, and Australia's COVID response in whole. On August 17, 2021, while the Victorian Parliament was closed due to restrictions, the two protested park closures on the steps of Parliament in the presence of armed police. They refused to comply with a vaccine mandate for MP's, with Limbrick publicly destroying his vaccination status card.

In July 2021, Campbell Newman, the former Premier of Queensland and Leader of the Liberal National Party of Queensland, resigned from the LNP, stating the LNP candidate in the 2021 Stretton state by-election was "let down by a party and leadership that never stands up for anything". In August 2021, he announced he had joined the LDP to run as the party's lead Senate candidate in Queensland at the 2022 Australian federal election.

On 16 October 2021, Quilty, Limbrick, and other opposition MPs were ejected from Victorian Parliament for refusing to disclose their vaccination status. After two weeks of exclusion, the MPs submitted their vaccination status on 28 October 2021, in order to return to parliament to oppose the legislative agenda of the government.

On 23 November 2021, the LDP announced a preference deal with the United Australia Party in the upcoming Australian elections where each party would encourage its members to choose the other as their second preference.

On 24 November 2021, Krystle Mitchell − an acting Senior Sergeant of Victoria Police who resigned after speaking publicly against enforcing health orders − announced she would be running for the Senate with the LDP as the second candidate on their ticket in Victoria.

On 8 April 2022, Senator Sam McMahon joined the party after defecting from the Country Liberal Party in January. This gave the federal parliamentary representation to the Liberal Democratic Party. McMahon would also be the lead Senate candidate for the party at the May federal election. She was unsuccessful in her election and the party lost parliamentary representation. AEC's consideration to deregister the party continued after the writs for the election were returned in June, and the party was deregistered at the federal level on 19 July 2022.

On 16 July 2023, the Libertarian Party Queensland (LPQ) was created as a standalone political party affiliated with the Libertarian Party (Australia). Richard Davies was elected as the president. It was then registered with Electoral Commission of Queensland (ECQ) on 2 August 2024.^{[81]}

=== Name change ===
Logo used from 2022 until the party's name change in 2023

Logo and new LP abbreviation used since the name change until 2024

Election poster using the new party name and logo for the first time at the 2023 Mulgrave state by-election

Due to changes in the Commonwealth Electoral Act 1918 and a subsequent objection to the party's name by the Liberal Party, the Liberal Democratic Party applied to the Australian Electoral Commission (AEC) to change its name to the Liberty and Democracy Party in February 2022 in order to remain registered. The party then withdrew the name change application on 22 March 2022. On 1 April 2022, the AEC gave notice to the party that it would consider deregistering the latter, giving one month for the party to appeal the notice. However, as the writs for the May federal election were issued the following week on 11 April, the party register then would be "frozen" and this meant the party was allowed to contest the election with its current name.

In May 2023, LDP members voted on a new name for the party. The party adopted the new name "Libertarian Party", and the logo of the party bears the abbreviation of the new name "LP". By January 2024, the Party had regained registration with the Australian Electoral Commission, under the new name.

The Victorian Electoral Commission received an application from the party about a name change in June 2023. On 16 July 2023, all state party branches, with the exception of New South Wales, formally changed their names to the Libertarian Party. In October 2023, the party also applied for party registration federally with the AEC under the new party name. The federal party registration was approved on 12 January 2024.

The party contested under the new name for the first time at the Mulgrave state by-election in Victoria in November 2023, and federally at the Dunkley by-election in March 2024.

=== 2025 Australian federal election ===
In March 2025, the Libertarian Party formed a joint ticket alliance called the Australia First Alliance (AFA) with the vaccine-sceptic HEART Party and Gerard Rennick People First. The party received its worst result since its initial founding receiving 0.54% of the vote for the House of Representatives.

== Policies and political positions ==
The LP states that it adheres to classical liberal, small government and laissez-faire principles coupled with what the party considers as a high regard for individual freedom and individual responsibility.

The party does not hold a stance on abortion. In March 2025, the Libertarian Party member of the New South Wales (NSW) Parliament, John Ruddick opposed a proposed amendment to a law that would mean the majority of hospitals in NSW would provide abortion-related services.

Libertarian Party supported policies include:

=== National policy ===
- Opposes government imposed restrictions and mandates curtailing personal freedoms
- Make the company tax rate zero
- Reduce economic regulations, such as by cutting the number of workers at the Australian Taxation Office by 50% and privatising ABC, SBS, and NBN
- Get rid of renewable energy targets and net-zero goals
- Abolish the Clean Energy Finance Corporation and the Renewable Energy Target
- Federal budgets which are neither in surplus, nor deficit, but balanced
- Abolish the Department of Education
- Support of a 20% flat rate income tax with a $50,000 tax free threshold
- Supports voluntary superannuation
- Supports freezing and decentralising the minimum wage
- Supports utilisation of nuclear energy
- Supports decentralising education
- Supports free speech and opposes censorship (supports no government censorship of the internet)
- Supports targeting the production of pornography, where one or more parties may not be capable of giving consent
- Opposes mass surveillance and digital identities
- Define a woman as "a member of the female sex irrespective of age."
- "Protect women's-only spaces"
- Opposes gender self-identification (would restrict identity documents such as birth certificates and passports from reflecting a person's gender identity)
- "Restrict gender transition surgery and hormone treatment to adults"
- Wants Australia to leave the World Health Organization (WHO)

== Election results ==
=== Federal parliament ===
Senate
| Election year | No. of overall votes | % of overall vote | No. of overall seats won | No. of overall seats | +/– |
|---|---|---|---|---|---|
| 2007 (Note: Ran as the Liberty and Democracy Party) | 16,942 | 0.13 | 0 / 40 | 0 / 76 | — |
| 2010 (Note: Ran as the Liberal Democratic Party (LDP)) | 230,191 | 1.81 | 0 / 40 | 0 / 76 | 0 |
| 2013 | 523,831 | 3.91 | 1 / 40 | 1 / 76 | ▲1 |
| 2016 | 298,915 | 2.16 | 1 / 76 | 1 / 76 | 0 |
| 2019 | 169,735 | 1.16 | 0 / 40 | 0 / 76 | ▼1 |
| 2022 | 340,132 | 2.26 | 0 / 40 | 0 / 76 | 0 |
| 2025 (Note: Ran as the Libertarian Party) | 83,746 | 0.54 | 0 / 40 | 0 / 76 | 0 |

=== State parliament ===
==== New South Wales ====
Legislative Council
| Election year | No. of overall votes | % of overall vote | No. of overall seats | +/– |
|---|---|---|---|---|
| 2019 | 96,999 | 2.18 | 0 / 42 | — |
| 2023 | 162,755 | 3.3 | 1 / 42 | ▲1 |

==== Queensland ====
Legislative Assembly of Queensland
| Election year | No. of overall votes | % of overall vote | No. of overall seats | +/– |
|---|---|---|---|---|
| 2024 | 4,141 | 0.13 | 0 / 93 | — |

==== South Australia ====
Legislative Council
| Election year | No. of overall votes | % of overall vote | No. of overall seats | +/– |
|---|---|---|---|---|
| 2014 | 6,091 | 0.60 | 0 / 22 | — |
| 2018 | 25,956 | 2.47 | 0 / 22 | — |
| 2022 | 36,445 | 3.35 | 0 / 22 | — |

==== Victoria ====
Legislative Council
| Election year | No. of overall votes | % of overall vote | No. of overall seats | +/– |
|---|---|---|---|---|
| 2014 | 104,516 | 3.06 | 0 / 40 | |
| 2018 | 89,428 | 2.50 | 2 / 40 | ▲2 |
| 2022 | 99,054 | 2.64 | 1 / 40 | ▼1 |

==== Western Australia ====
Legislative Council
| Election year | No. of overall votes | % of overall vote | No. of overall seats | +/– |
|---|---|---|---|---|
| 2017 | 23,848 | 1.77 | 1 / 36 | ▲1 |
| 2021 | 9,218 | 0.64 | 0 / 36 | ▼1 |
| 2025 | 6,154 | 0.62 | 0 / 37 | |

==== Australian Capital Territory ====
Legislative Assembly
| Election year | No. of overall votes | % of overall vote | No. of overall seats | +/– |
|---|---|---|---|---|
| 2001 | 1,873 | 0.98 | 0 / 17 | |
| 2004 | 2,666 | 1.31 | 0 / 17 | |
| 2008 | 774 | 0.37 | 0 / 17 | |
| 2012 | 2,340 | 1.06 | 0 / 17 | |
| 2016 | 5,028 | 2.06 | 0 / 25 | |
| 2020 | 1,209 | 0.45 | 0 / 25 | |
| 2024 | 399 | 0.15 | 0 / 25 | |

== Elected representatives ==
=== Current ===
==== State ====
| Image | Name | Term | State | Office | Notes |
|---|---|---|---|---|---|
| | David Limbrick | 22 June 2022 – present | VIC | Victorian Legislative Council (South-Eastern Metropolitan) | First in office from 2018 until April 2022 |
| | John Ruddick | 20 April 2023 – present | NSW | New South Wales Legislative Council | First Libertarian member of the NSW parliament |

==== Local ====
| Image | Name | Term | State | Office | Notes |
|---|---|---|---|---|---|
| | John Larter | 17 July 2024 – present | NSW | Snowy Valleys Council | First elected in 2017, joined party while in office |
| | Paul Barker | October 2020 – present | VIC | Surf Coast Shire Council (Torquay Ward) | |
| | Olga Quilty | October 2020 – present | VIC | Wodonga City Council | |
| | Vince Ferreri | October 2024 – present | NSW | Camden Council (North) | |
| | Rose Sicari | October 2024 – present | NSW | Camden Council (South) | |
| | Michael Graham | October 2024 – present | NSW | Midcoast Council | |
| | Phil Beazley | October 2024 – present | NSW | Midcoast Council | |
| | Mal McKenzie | October 2024 – present | NSW | Midcoast Council | |
| | Vanessa Pollak | October 2024 – present | NSW | Penrith City Council (South) | |
| | Mark Hornshaw | October 2024 – present | NSW | Port Macquarie-Hastings Council | |
| | Scott Yeomans | October 2024 – present | NSW | Singleton Council | |
| | Gregory Harris | October 2024 – present | NSW | Upper Lachlan Shire Council | |

=== Former ===
==== Federal ====
| Image | Name | Term | Office | Notes |
|---|---|---|---|---|
| | David Leyonhjelm | 1 July 2014 – 1 March 2019 | Senator for New South Wales | Resigned to unsuccessfully contest 2019 New South Wales state election |
| | Duncan Spender | 20 March 2019 – 30 June 2019 | Senator for New South Wales | Replaced Leyonhjelm. Lost seat at 2019 election |
| | Sam McMahon | 8 April 2022 – 20 May 2022 | Senator for the Northern Territory | Joined party after leaving CLP. Lost seat at 2022 election |

==== State ====
| Image | Name | Term | State | Office | Notes |
|---|---|---|---|---|---|
| | Aaron Stonehouse | 22 May 2017 – 21 May 2021 | WA | Western Australian Legislative Council (South Metropolitan) | Lost seat at 2021 election |
| | Tim Quilty | 24 November 2018 – 26 November 2022 | VIC | Victorian Legislative Council (Northern Victoria) | Lost seat at 2022 election |

==== Local ====
| Image | Name | Term | State | Office | Notes |
|---|---|---|---|---|---|
| | Ben Buckley | October 2012 – October 2020 | VIC | East Gippsland Shire Council | |
| | Clinton Mead | 8 September 2012 – 10 September 2016 | NSW | Campbelltown City Council | Lost seat at 2016 election |
| | Jeff Pettett | 8 September 2012 – 2017 | NSW | Ku-ring-gai Council (Comenarra Ward) | Left party |
| | Tim Quilty | 22 October 2016 – 12 December 2018 | VIC | Wodonga City Council | Elected to Victorian Legislative Council in 2018 |
| | Samuel Gunning | 9 September 2017 – 4 December 2021 | NSW | North Sydney Council (Wollstonecraft Ward) | Did not seek re-election in 2021 |

== Donors ==
The Australia Institute's 2019 report found that the Liberal Democratic Party had received political donations of $37,311 from pro-gun groups between July 2011 and March 2019. The report contextualises their donations as similar in value to the Nationals, Labor and Country Alliance, whilst being less than those to Katter's Australia Party, the Shooters Party, and the Liberal Party.

== See also ==
- List of political parties in Australia
- Free Trade Party
