= Sam McMahon =

Australian politician

Senator for the Northern Territory
- In office 18 May 2019 – 20 May 2022
- Preceded by: Nigel Scullion
- Succeeded by: Jacinta Nampijinpa Price

Personal details
- Born: 11 December 1967 (age 58) Sydney, New South Wales, Australia
- Party: Liberal Democratic (since April 2022)
- Other political affiliations: Independent (January–April 2022); Country Liberal/Nationals (until January 2022)
- Spouse: Wayne Nayda
- Education: University of Queensland
- Occupation: Veterinarian

Samantha Jane McMahon (born 11 December 1967) is a former Australian politician who was a Senator for the Northern Territory between the 2019 federal election and the 2022 federal election. McMahon is a member of the Liberal Democratic Party (LDP), having joined the party in April 2022, several months after resigning from the Country Liberal Party (CLP). While she was a CLP member, she sat in the Nationals party room in federal parliament. She was a veterinarian in Katherine before entering politics.

== Early life ==
McMahon was born in Sydney on 11 December 1967. She grew up on a farm in Nanango, Queensland. She completed a Bachelor of Veterinary Science at the University of Queensland.

== Career ==
McMahon accepted a position in the Northern Territory after her graduation. She has owned and operated veterinary practices in Katherine, Howard Springs, Nhulunbuy, Tennant Creek, and Alice Springs. She was a national director of the Australian Veterinary Association for five years and president of the Northern Territory division for two years. She became a Fellow of the Australian Institute of Company Directors in 2003. She won the Centenary Medal for business leadership in 2001, was awarded the Australian Veterinary Association Meritorious Service Award in 2014, and was awarded the NT Telstra small business award in 2017.

== Politics ==
In March 2019, McMahon won preselection to replace Nigel Scullion as the Country Liberal Party's lead Senate candidate at the 2019 federal election. She was elected to a term beginning on 18 May 2019, and chose to sit with the National Party in federal parliament, following her predecessor. In May 2021 she was appointed chair of the Joint Standing Committee on the National Capital and External Territories.

In June 2021, McMahon was defeated for CLP preselection at the 2022 federal election by Jacinta Price. In the week leading up to the ballot, Nine Publishing reported that at least ten senators believed she had been visibly drunk while in the Senate chamber on 23 June. A spokesman stated that she was feeling "unwell" and that the allegations were part of a smear campaign to discredit her in the lead-up to the preselection.

In December 2021 it was alleged that following a 'boozey' Christmas party McMahon was escorted from the premises to a waiting taxi, at which point McMahon physically assaulted Nationals federal director and event organiser Jonathan Hawkes.

In January 2022, McMahon resigned from the Country Liberal Party and moved to the crossbench to sit as an independent. She later explained in March 2022 that she resigned due to alleged abuse by former staffer Jason Riley. On 8 April 2022, McMahon announced she had joined the Liberal Democrats, and would run on the party's Northern Territory Senate ticket at the May federal election. The Liberal Democrats won approximately 9% of the vote in the Northern Territory Senate race, not enough for McMahon to retain her seat in the chamber.

=== Positions ===
In January 2020, during the 2019–20 Australian bushfire season, McMahon tweeted that the Australian Greens' "ridiculous agenda" of opposing logging had "lead [sic] to these horrible fires". A Guardian Australia article published in the same month identified her as one of the "climate doubters" within the Coalition. In March 2020, McMahon argued that a nuclear power plant should be built in northern Australia to lower emissions and improve the country's economy.

In August 2021, McMahon announced she had drafted a bill to expand the legislative powers of the Northern Territory Legislative Assembly and reduce the power of federal parliament to veto territory legislation. This would include a partial repeal of the Euthanasia Laws Act 1997, allowing the Legislative Assembly to legalise assisted suicide.

In November 2021, McMahon was one of five Coalition senators who voted against the government in support of One Nation's COVID-19 Vaccination Status (Prevention of Discrimination) Bill 2021.

== Personal life ==
McMahon lives on a farm outside Katherine and is an avid water skier and horse rider. In September 2019, McMahon announced that she had separated from her husband, Wayne Nayda.
