= Trish Crossin =

Australian politician (1956–2026)

Trish Crossin AM
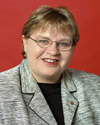

Senator for the Northern Territory
- In office 16 June 1998 – 6 September 2013
- Preceded by: Bob Collins
- Succeeded by: Nova Peris

Personal details
- Born: 21 March 1956 Melbourne, Victoria, Australia
- Died: 13 April 2026 (aged 70)
- Party: Australian Labor Party
- Spouse: Mark Crossin
- Children: 4
- Website: Trish Crossin

Patricia Margaret Crossin (21 March 1956 – 13 April 2026) was an Australian politician, who served as a Senator for the Northern Territory from June 1998 to September 2013 representing the Australian Labor Party.

== Life and career ==
Crossin was born in Melbourne and was educated at Deakin University, where she graduated in education. She worked as a teacher, and was an industrial officer of the National Tertiary Education Union between 1996 and 1998.

In 1998, she was appointed by the Northern Territory Legislative Assembly to fill the casual Senate vacancy created by the resignation of Bob Collins. Crossin was Deputy Opposition Whip in the Senate from 2001 to 2004.

On 21 January 2013, Crossin was informed by prime minister Julia Gillard, ahead of the official public announcement, that her support for the Senate candidacy in the 2013 Australian federal election would instead go to Aboriginal activist and former Olympic gold medallist Nova Peris.

On 20 October 2015, she became a director of the Indigenous Land and Sea Corporation.

She was married to Mark Crossin, and had four children.

Crossin was made a Member of the Order of Australia in the 2023 King's Birthday Honours, for "significant service to the Parliament of Australia, and to the community of the Northern Territory".

Crossin died on 13 April 2026, following a heart attack on a flight to Australia from the United States, where she had been celebrating her 70th birthday.

Parliament of Australia
Preceded by Bob Collins	Senator for the Northern Territory; 1998–2013; Served alongside: Grant Tambling, Nigel Scullion	Succeeded by Nova Peris
