= Ian Clunies Ross =

Australian veterinary scientist (1899–1959)

Sir Ian Clunies Ross CMG FAA
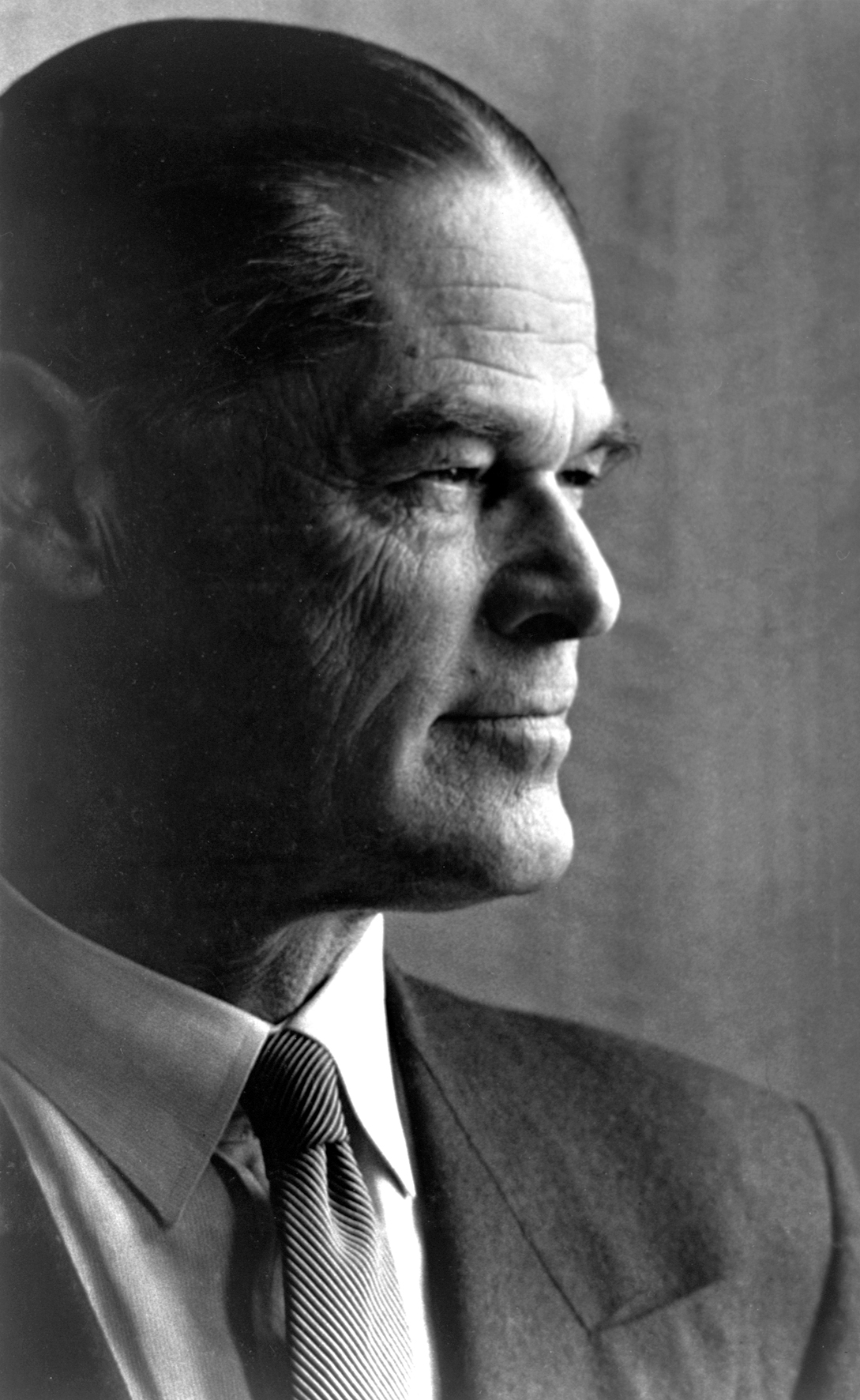
- Clunies Ross circa 1950

Chairman of the CSIRO
- In office 19 May 1949 – 20 June 1959
- Preceded by: David Rivett
- Succeeded by: Fred White

Personal details
- Born: 22 February 1899 Bathurst, New South Wales, Australia
- Died: 20 June 1959 (aged 60) Victoria, Australia
- Spouse: Janet Carter
- Education: Newington College; University of Sydney
- Occupation: Veterinary scientist
- Awards: James Cook Medal (1956)

Sir William Ian Clunies Ross CMG FAA (22 February 1899 – 20 June 1959) was an Australian veterinary scientist. He has been described as the "architect" of Australia's scientific boom, for his stewardship of the Commonwealth Scientific and Industrial Research Organisation (CSIRO), the Australian scientific organisation.

== Family ==
Ian Clunies Ross was born in Bathurst, New South Wales on 22 February 1899. His grandfather, Robert Clunies Ross, was a brother of John Clunies-Ross, who settled with his family and crew on Cocos (Keeling) Islands in 1826–7 and proclaimed a kingdom. He married Janet Leslie Carter on 6 October 1927, in Sydney, Australia. The couple had three sons, Anthony, Adrian and David.

== Education ==
Clunies Ross was educated at Newington College (1912–1916) and in 1917 he entered the University of Sydney, in the Agriculture Faculty, and transferred to veterinary science at the beginning of 1918, graduating with second class honours in 1920.

His father died in 1914, and his brothers Egerton and Rob died in WWI, killed in action and from pneumonic influenza respectively.

== Veterinary career ==
In 1921, Clunies Ross was given a temporary lectureship in veterinary anatomy; the following year he was made a Fellow of The Walter and Eliza Hall Institute of Medical Research, allowing him to a travel overseas. He spent a year working on animal parasites at the Molteno Institute for Research in Parasitology in Cambridge and the School of Tropical Medicine in London. He also spent time in the United States, mainly in Texas and Louisiana, where he looked at methods of field control of parasitic diseases. When he returned to Sydney he set up a veterinary practice, lectured at the university and continued his own research on the hydatid parasite (Echinococcus granulosus), the liver fluke (Fasciola hepatica), and the dog-tick (Ixodes holocyclus). He developed an immunization for dogs to protect against the dog-tick.

== CSIR ==
In 1926 Clunies Ross was appointed parasitologist to the newly established Council for Scientific and Industrial Research (CSIR), and was funded to continue research at the Sydney University Veterinary School. On 6 October 1927, he married English honours graduate Janet Carter at the Catholic Apostolic Church, Redfern. They had three sons: Anthony, Adrian and David. By mid-1931, three other researchers were working with him, and in November 1931 the team moved into CSIR's new McMaster Animal Health Laboratory. Clunies Ross was appointed as the officer-in-charge of the laboratory. In 1928, his thesis on the hydatid parasite was accepted by the University of Sydney for the degree of Doctor of Veterinary Science. Work at the McMaster Laboratory on the control of sheep liver-fluke, made a significant improvement to animal health and the returns from agriculture in the 1930s.

== Science administration ==
Following his time at the McMaster Laboratory, Clunies Ross spent time in Asia, and he was the Australian representative at the International Wool Secretariat in London from 1937 to 1940. He enjoyed this administrative role. He also served as a member of Australia's delegation to the League of Nations Assembly in 1938. He and his family returned to Australia when World War II broke out, he returned to the Veterinary school at the University of Sydney. He was president of the Australian Institute of International Affairs from 1941 to 1945. He was a notable member of the Australian Veterinary Association. He was a vocal commentator on international affairs throughout the remainder of his career.

== CSIRO ==
In 1943, Clunies Ross was appointed Director of Scientific Personnel in the Commonwealth Directorate of Manpower and also Adviser on the Pastoral Industry to the Department of War Organization of Industry. He held these positions until 1945 while continuing work connected with his university position. At the end of the war he left the university to assist the CSIR in planning sheep and wool-textile research. In 1946 he was appointed a full-time member of the CSIR Executive Committee, which was situated in Melbourne. He served as the executive officer of the CSIR until 1949 when it was renamed the CSIRO. He was chairman of the CSIRO until his death in 1959. During this time he oversaw the release of myxomatosis for rabbit control in Australia. In his retirement he was president of the Melbourne Wallaby Club 1954 – 1955.

While in his role at the CSIRO Clunies Ross came into conflict with pioneering radio astronomer Ruby Payne-Scott over the role of women in the organization, and her role in particular. The two met in person to discuss the disparity in pay and working conditions between male and female employees of CSIRO, but this did not result in change to the status quo. When Payne-Scott's marriage and pregnancy were revealed, the two had a hostile exchange of letters, and CSIRO consequently deprived her of permanent employee status and pension funds.

== Later years and legacy ==
In 1954, Clunies Ross was knighted and appointed Order of St Michael and St George (CMG), and made a Foundation Fellow of the Australian Academy of Science (FAA).

He died of atherosclerotic heart disease on 20 June 1959 in Melbourne, and is buried in Box Hill cemetery.

The career of Ian Clunies Ross is widely commemorated in Australia. The Australian $50 bank note issued in 1973 celebrated Ian Clunies Ross on one side, and Howard Florey on the other. The National Science Centre in Parkville, Victoria was renamed as Clunies Ross House in 1968, and decorated with a mural by Robert Ingpen celebrating Clunies Ross' career.

== Honours ==
From 1973 until 1995 an image of Clunies Ross was featured on the reverse of the Australian $50 banknote.

- Companion of the Order of St Michael and St George (CMG) (1 January 1954) as Chairman of the CSIRO
- Knight Bachelor (10 June 1954) as Chairman of the CSIRO

=== Namesakes ===
- Clunies Ross National Science and Technology Award
- Clunies Ross Street in Canberra, Australian Capital Territory, Australia
- Clunies Ross Street in Prospect, New South Wales, Australia
- Clunies Ross Court in Brisbane Technology Park, Eight Mile Plains, Queensland, Australia
- Clunies Ross Award or the Australian Academy of Technological Sciences and Engineering Clunies Ross Award from 1959
- Clunies Ross House at Newington College
- Ian Clunies Ross lecture theatre in the J.D.Stewart Building, School of Veterinary Science, University of Sydney

== Bibliography ==
- O'Dea, C. 1997. Ian Clunies Ross – a biography. Hyland House, South Melbourne ISBN 1-86447-018-6
- Australian Academy of Science Biography – Ian Clunies Ross
