= Nigel Scullion =

Australian politician

The Honourable Nigel Scullion
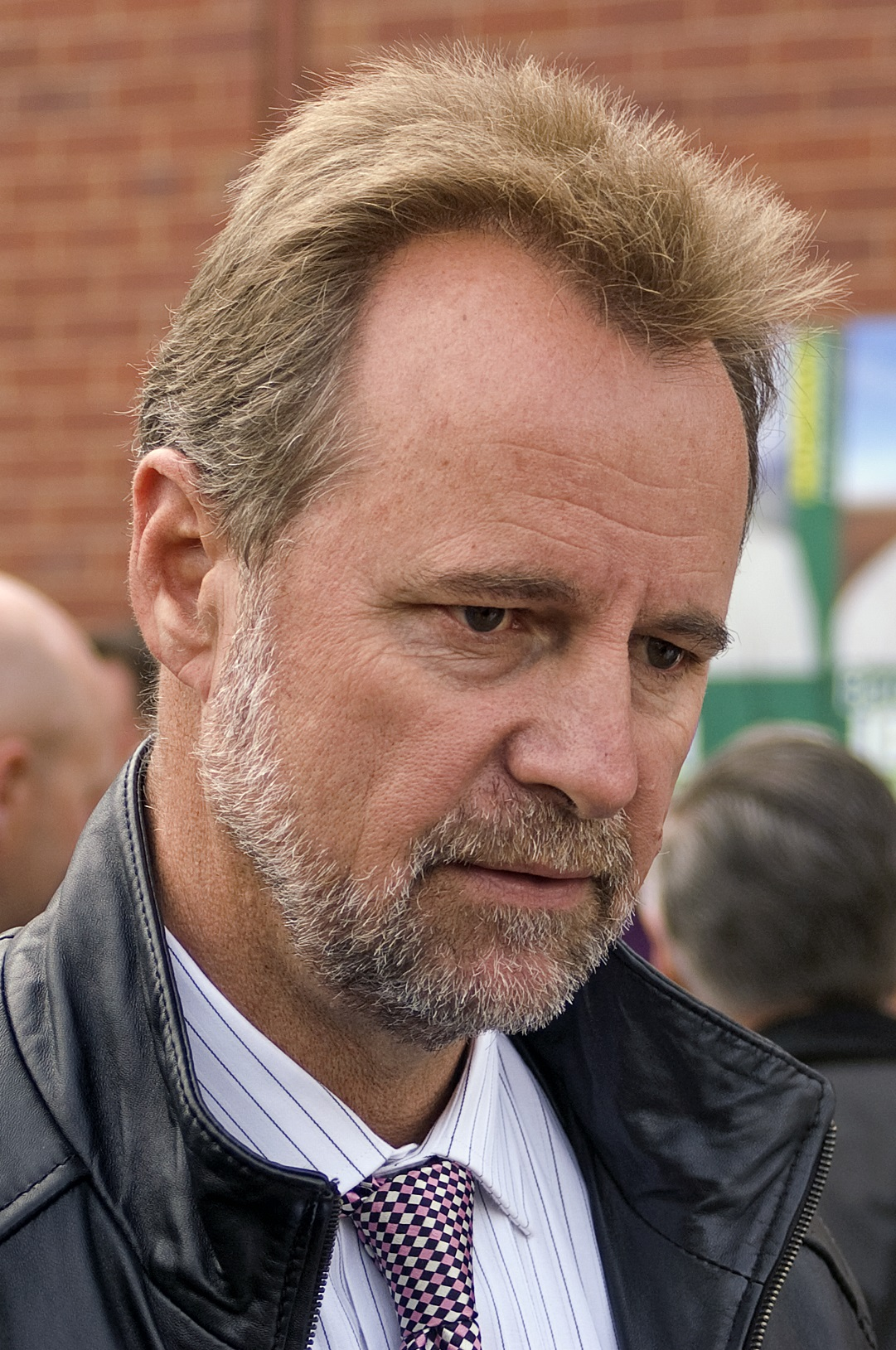

Minister for Indigenous Affairs
- In office 18 September 2013 – 29 May 2019
- Prime Minister: Tony Abbott; Malcolm Turnbull; Scott Morrison
- Preceded by: Jenny Macklin
- Succeeded by: Ken Wyatt

Deputy Leader of the National Party
- In office 3 December 2007 – 13 September 2013
- Leader: Warren Truss
- Preceded by: Warren Truss
- Succeeded by: Barnaby Joyce

Minister for Community Services
- In office 30 January 2007 – 3 December 2007
- Prime Minister: John Howard
- Preceded by: John Cobb
- Succeeded by: Jenny Macklin

Senator for the Northern Territory
- In office 10 November 2001 – 17 May 2019
- Preceded by: Grant Tambling
- Succeeded by: Sam McMahon

Personal details
- Born: Nigel Gregory Scullion; 4 May 1956 (age 70) London, England
- Citizenship: Australian; British (1956–2001)
- Party: Country Liberal Party
- Other political affiliations: The Nationals (federal caucus)
- Spouse(s): Jenny Scullion (divorced); Carol Sexton
- Children: 3
- Occupation: Fisherman

Nigel Gregory Scullion (born 4 May 1956) is a former Australian politician who served as a senator for the Northern Territory from 2001 until 2019. He was a member of the Country Liberal Party (CLP) and sat with the National Party in federal parliament. He held ministerial office under four prime ministers.

Scullion was a professional fisherman prior to entering politics. He was first elected to the Senate at the 2001 federal election, and briefly served as Minister for Community Services in the Howard government in 2007. He was deputy leader of the National Party from 2007 to 2013, the first senator to hold the position, and served two terms as the party's Senate leader (2007–2008 and 2013–2019). In 2013, Scullion was appointed Minister for Indigenous Affairs in the Abbott government. He held the same position in the Turnbull and Morrison governments before retiring from parliament at the 2019 election. He was the only minister to hold the same portfolio in those three governments.

== Early life ==
Scullion was born in London, England, then moved to live in Australia. He went to High School in Deakin, Canberra.

He is married with three children. Before entering the Senate he was a professional fisherman and graduated from the Australian Rural Leadership Program.

== Career ==
Scullion received media attention early in his career when questions arose over how his business relationships with government bodies might have affected his eligibility to sit in parliament. Investigations continued for some time, but in the end did not affect his membership of Parliament.

On 30 January 2007, he was appointed Minister for Community Services in the Australian Government. He held office for only 10 months before the Howard government was defeated in an election.

In February 2007, Scullion was elected to the position of deputy Senate leader of the federal National Party and was subsequently promoted to the positions of deputy parliamentary leader of the National Party and leader of the party in the Senate on 3 December 2007, following the coalition's defeat. On 6 December 2007 he was named as Shadow Minister for Agriculture, Forestry and Fisheries in the shadow ministry chosen by new Opposition Leader Brendan Nelson. In 2008, he was defeated by Barnaby Joyce for the Senate leadership, but retained the deputy leadership of the National Party.

Scullion was re-elected at the 2010 election and appointed Shadow Minister for Indigenous Affairs by Opposition leader, Tony Abbott. In February 2012, Scullion appeared in the second episode of Kitchen Cabinet with Annabel Crabb, when they went into the mud flats for crustaceans, which she has recalled as the most memorable show. Following Joyce's move to the House of Representatives in 2013, Scullion reclaimed his position of Senate leader but lost the deputy parliamentary leadership to Joyce.

On 11 February 2016 Joyce was elected leader of the Nationals with Fiona Nash as his deputy. As Nash was also a Senator, Scullion had to relinquish the Senate leadership to Senator Nash. In fact, Senator Nash had been Senator Scullion's Senate deputy prior to her election as deputy leader of the parliamentary party.

After the High Court ruled that Joyce and Nash were ineligible during the 2017 Australian parliamentary eligibility crisis, Scullion was appointed interim parliamentary leader of the National Party. Despite this appointment, Scullion did not become Acting Prime Minister during an overseas trip by Prime Minister Malcolm Turnbull. On 26 January 2019 he announced he would not recontest his Senate seat at the forthcoming election.

Parliament of Australia
Preceded by Grant Tambling	Senator for the Northern Territory; 2001–2019	Succeeded by Sam McMahon
Political offices
Preceded by John Cobb	Minister for Community Services; 2007	Succeeded by Jenny Macklin
Preceded by Jenny Macklin as Minister for Families, Community Services and Indigenous Affairs	Minister for Indigenous Affairs; 2013–2019	Succeeded by Ken Wyatt
Party political offices
Preceded by Sandy Macdonald	Deputy Leader of the National Party in the Senate; 2007	Succeeded by Ron Boswell
Preceded by Ron Boswell	Leader of the National Party in the Senate; 2007–2008	Succeeded by Barnaby Joyce
Preceded by Warren Truss	Deputy Leader of the National Party; 2007–2013	Succeeded by Barnaby Joyce
Preceded by Barnaby Joyce	Leader of the National Party in the Senate; 2013–2019	Succeeded by Bridget McKenzie
