= Ted Robertson =

Australian politician

Senator for Northern Territory
- In office 13 December 1975 – 10 July 1987
- Succeeded by: Bob Collins

Personal details
- Born: 18 March 1929 Albany, Western Australia
- Died: 5 January 1991 (aged 61) Canberra, Australia
- Party: Labor
- Spouse: Audrey Curnow (m. 1954)
- Education: University of Western Australia
- Occupation: Schoolteacher

Edward Albert Robertson (18 March 1929 – 5 January 1991) was an Australian politician. Born in Albany, Western Australia, he was educated at the University of Western Australia before becoming a teacher. Having moved to the Northern Territory, he became Chairman of the Northern Territory Council of Social Services. In 1975, he was elected to the Australian Senate as one of the first two senators from the Northern Territory (the other was Bernie Kilgariff). He represented the Labor Party. He remained in the Senate until his retirement in 1987.

== Early life ==
Robertson was born on 18 March 1929 in Albany, Western Australia. He was the only child of Ethel Lucy (née Bamford) and Neil "Jock" Robertson. His mother was born in England and his father in Scotland.

Robertson's parents separated before he was born and he was raised by his mother and maternal grandparents. He attended Albany Primary School and Albany High School, going on to train as a schoolteacher at Claremont Teachers College in Perth. He later completed the degrees of Bachelor of Arts and Bachelor of Education as a distance student at the University of Western Australia.

== Teaching career ==
Robertson taught at schools around Western Australia, including as a senior master at Albany High School. In 1963 he was seconded to Darwin, as a supervisor of publications and adult education in the Northern Territory Education Department. He returned to Perth after two years, but in 1968 moved his family back to Darwin where he became an inspector of schools and adviser on education policy. He was chairman of the Regional Council for Social Development and the Northern Territory Council of Social Services.

== Politics ==
Robertson first joined the ALP while living in Perth and was secretary of the East Cannington branch. He served on the state executive in Western Australia from 1966 to 1967. In the Northern Territory, he was secretary and later president of the party's Darwin branch and served as secretary (1968–1971) and president (1972–1974) of the Australian Labor Party (Northern Territory Branch).

Robertson stood as the ALP candidate for the House of Representatives seat of Northern Territory at the 1969 and 1972 federal elections, losing to Country MP Sam Calder on each occasion.

=== Senate ===
Robertson was elected to the Senate at the 1975 federal election, becoming one of the Northern Territory's first two senators alongside Bernie Kilgariff of the Country Liberal Party. He would be re-elected on four occasions.

In the Senate, Robertson advocated for the passage of the Aboriginal Land Rights Act 1976 and chaired a select committee into substance abuse in the Northern Territory, as well as serving on the Joint Select Committee on Aboriginal Land Rights in the Northern Territory and Senate Standing Committee on Education and the Arts.

== Personal life ==
Robertson married Hazel Audrey Curnow in 1954, with whom he had two sons and a daughter. He settled in Canberra after the end of his political career and served as national president of YMCA Australia. He died at his home in Canberra on 5 January 1991.

Parliament of Australia
New seat	Senator for the Northern Territory; 1975–1987; Served alongside: Bernie Kilgariff	Succeeded by Bob Collins
