= Nova Peris =

Australian politician and sportswoman (born 1971)

Nova Peris OAM
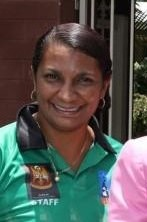
- Peris in 2012

9th Chair of the Australian Republic Movement
- In office 13 March 2023 – 10 July 2024 Serving with Craig Foster
- Succeeded by: Esther Anatolitis; Nathan Hansford

Senator for the Northern Territory
- In office 7 September 2013 – 9 May 2016
- Preceded by: Trish Crossin
- Succeeded by: Malarndirri McCarthy

Personal details
- Born: Nova Maree Peris; 25 February 1971 (age 55) Darwin, Northern Territory, Australia
- Party: Australian Labor Party
- Spouse(s): Sean Kneebone (1995–2001); Daniel Batman (2002–2010); Scott Appleton (2012–present)
- Sports career
- Height: 171 cm (5 ft 7 in)
Medal record
Representing Australia
Women's field hockey
Olympic Games
Gold medal – first place	1996 Atlanta	Team competition
World Cup
Gold medal – first place	1994 Dublin	Team competition
Champions Trophy
Gold medal – first place	1993 Amstelveen	Team competition
Gold medal – first place	1995 Mar del Plata	Team competition
Women's Athletics
Commonwealth Games
Gold medal – first place	1998 Kuala Lumpur	200 metres
Gold medal – first place	1998 Kuala Lumpur	4x100m relay
- Updated on 22 January 2013

Nova Maree Peris OAM (born 25 February 1971) is an Aboriginal Australian athlete and former politician. As part of the Australian women's field hockey (Hockeyroos) team at the 1996 Olympic Games, she was the first Aboriginal Australian to win an Olympic gold medal. She later switched sports to sprinting and went to the 1998 Commonwealth Games and 2000 Olympic Games. She was elected to the Australian Senate at the 2013 federal election, after then Prime Minister Julia Gillard named her as a "captain's pick", installing her as the preselected Labor candidate over incumbent Labor senator Trish Crossin. She retired from the Senate in 2016.

== Early life and education ==
Peris was born in Darwin, Northern Territory. Her biological father was Indigenous rights activist John Christophersen, although she had no contact with him between the ages of 2 and 16. Her mother, Joan, had been removed from her own mother, and raised in the Catholic mission on Melville Island, as one of the Stolen Generations. She lived with her family in a Housing Commission unit in Fannie Bay, an inner northern suburb; though her family descends from the Gija people people of East Kimberley, the Yawuru people of West Kimberley and the Muran Clan of the Iwatja people of West Arnhem Land. She is said to have frequently ran away from school, with sport being her main interest. At age 13, she gave up athletics when she was selected for the national schoolgirl hockey team.

== Sporting career ==
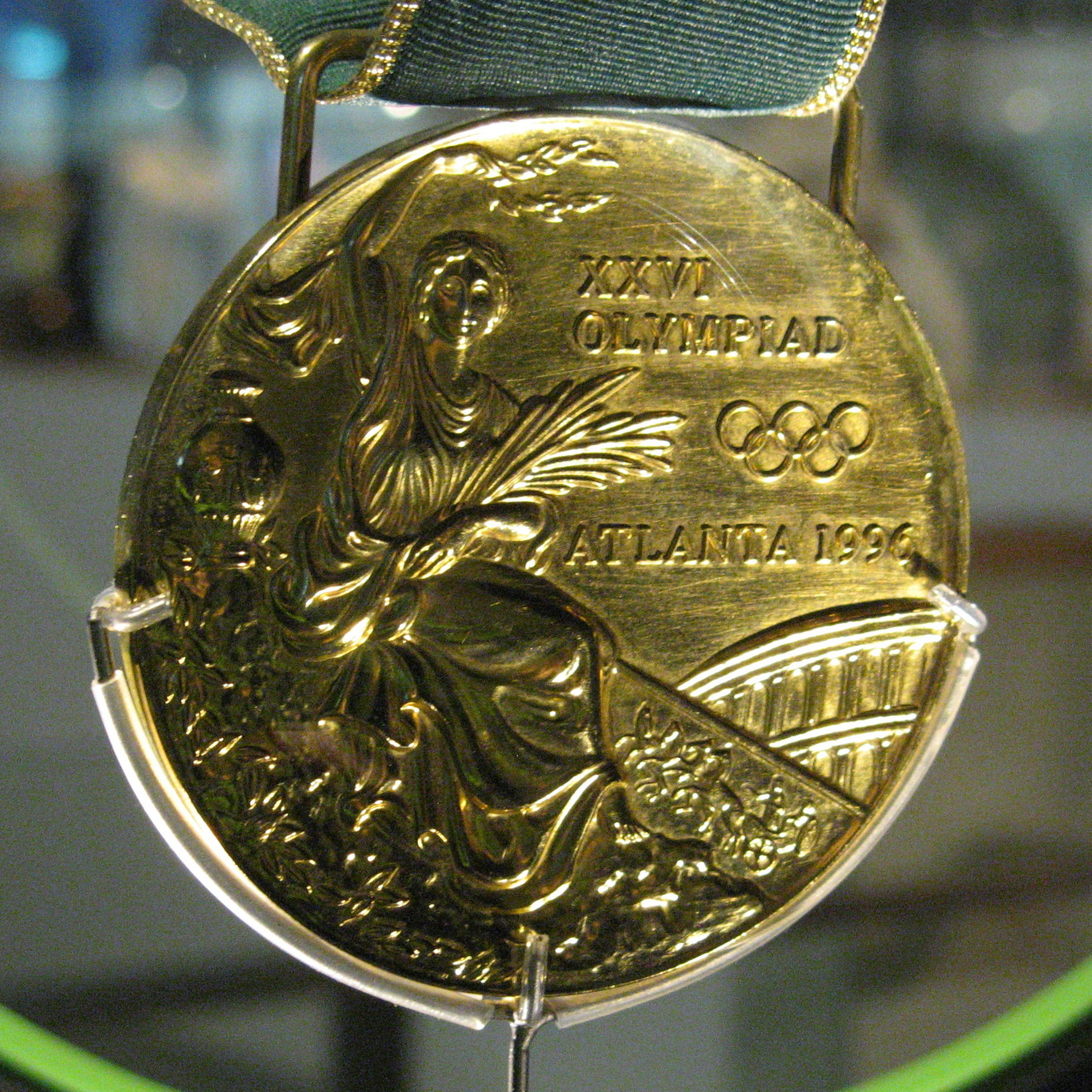
The Gold Medal of Nova Peris, from the 1996 Olympics in Atlanta

Peris was chosen for the Australian Women's Hockey Team, the Hockeyroos, in 1992. By that time she already had a young daughter, Jessica. She remained in this highly successful team until 1996 when they won the gold medal at the Atlanta Olympic Games.

Peris was a representative in the Australian Women's Hockey team at the 1996 Summer Olympics, becoming the first Aboriginal Australian to win an Olympic gold medal. In 1997, she switched sports and a year later she became a double gold medalist in the 1998 Commonwealth Games (Kuala Lumpur) winning the 200m sprint with a time of 22.77 seconds and sharing in Australia's 4 × 100 metres relay win. Peris was named Young Australian of the Year in 1997.

Peris continued to represent Australia on the athletics track, running over 200 metres at the 1999 World Athletics Championships and 400 metres at the Sydney Olympics in 2000. She made the Olympic semi-finals in her individual event and ran in the Australian 4 × 400 metres relay team, which made the final, finishing fifth.

In the Olympic year of 2000, a portrait of her was hung in the Sporting Archibald Prize, painted by Glenda Jones.

In 2005, she sold her Olympic memorabilia to the National Museum of Australia for $140,000. It included her gold medal, hockey stick, Sydney Olympic torch and the running shoes she wore in the Sydney Olympics.

== Political career ==
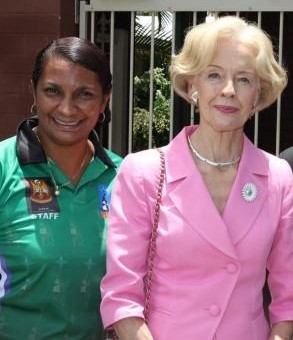
With Governor General Quentin Bryce, shortly before joining Parliament

On 22 January 2013 the Australian Prime Minister Julia Gillard announced she would invite Peris to join the Australian Labor Party and stand as a candidate for the Senate in the Northern Territory at the 2013 election. On 29 January 2013 her preselection was endorsed by the ALP executive 19 votes to 2, meaning her name was placed first on the ALP's senate ticket in the Northern Territory, supporting the likelihood that she would become Australia's first female Indigenous federal parliamentarian.

On 7 September 2013 Peris became Australia's first Indigenous woman elected to federal parliament. Peris was sworn into parliament on 12 November, and noted the apology to the stolen generation in her maiden speech.

The Northern Territory News obtained, what they claimed were private emails of Peris, in October 2014. The newspaper claimed she was conducting an affair with another athlete, and had sought government funding to arrange a trip together. No evidence was ever produced for the allegations and claims about hacked emails were later dismissed by Federal Police.

Peris announced on 24 May 2016 that she would not nominate to re-contest her Senate seat at the 2016 federal election. Fairfax and the ABC reported that Peris was one of the frontrunners being considered to replace Jason Mifsud as head of diversity for the Australian Football League (AFL). Malarndirri McCarthy announced on 25 May 2016 that she had been invited by Labor to nominate herself as Peris' Senate replacement and that she would do so. Nova Peris's Senate term ended at the double dissolution of 9 May 2016.

== Post political life ==
Although she has left Parliamentary politics, Peris has stayed involved in several high-level political causes, such as the 2023 Voice to Paraliament referendum. In speeches and in an opinion piece, she argued the reform would include Indigenous Australians in national life more. In 2023, she was one of several high-profile Indigenous Australians calling for reparations.

She is a strong advocate for education. In 2012 she became the founder and Patron of the Nova Peris Girls' Academy at St Johns Catholic College, in Darwin. As of November 2020 Peris is an Ambassador for the Australian Indigenous Education Foundation.

Peris has actively supported the Australian Republic Movement (ARM) since 1999, serving as one of its two Deputy Chairs by 2022, and its co-chair from March 2023. However, by May 2024, she had resigned from the role, saying it had become untenable whilst co-chair, footballer and human rights activist Craig Foster, was making "inaccurate and divisive public statements" regarding Israel and Gaza. She has been a vocal supporter of Israel, of the Australian Jewish Community, and has been recently noted for her public advocacy against antisemitism. Peris also argued that the Australian Aboriginal flag has been "misappropriated" by Palestine supporters in the Gaza war protests, a claim challenged by indigenous senator Lidia Thorpe and indigenous academic Chelsea Watego. In a 2024 interview with Sky News Australia, she defended her decision to resign from ARM by saying:

"I have a duty I feel as an Aboriginal person who has always stood against all forms of racial discrimination, and I hate the rise of anti-Semitism in this country and I feel for the Jewish people and everyone who has been affected..."

Peris told The Times of Israel that she could not "just sit back and see young Jewish kids being attacked the way that they are".

While no longer an athlete, Peris competed in the sixth season of Australian Survivor. She was eliminated on Day 10 and finished in 21st place.

Since 2024, Peris has publicly supported Israel; she spoke at a 7 October commemoration in Sydney and travelled to Israel with Indigenous delegations in 2025. She is a patron of the Labor Israel Action Committee.

In June 2025, Peris was accused of sharing Islamophobic content, after she retweeted a post on X (formerly known as Twitter) which described Muslims as "Satan worshipping cockroaches [that] need to be eradicated". That same month she was elected to the board of Hockey Australia.

In July 2026, it was reported that Peris is no longer a member of the Australian Labor Party, although she remains a patron of Labor Friends of Israel.

== Personal life ==
Peris has been married to Scott Appleton since 2012.

She had previously been married to Daniel Batman. The couple had two children, though they separated in 2010; with Batman later dying in a car accident. Previous to that she had been married to Sean Kneebone, who she had met when she was 17 and married in 1995. While married to Kneebone, she adopted the surname Peris-Kneebone but reverted following their divorce in 2001. From this time, Peris has three children: Jessica (with Kneebone) and Destiny and Jack (with Batman). She became a grandmother at the age of 40. Her son Jack was a footballer for the St Kilda Football Club in 2023, and subesequently joined the reserves for Essendon in the VFL.

As a child, her family attended St Martin De Porres Catholic Community at Casuarina church regularly; she still considers herself a Christian, while keeping an active interest in Australian spirituality.

== Published work ==
- Peris, Nova (2003). Nova: my story; the autobiography of Nova Peris (with I Heads). Sydney: ABC Books. ISBN 0-7333-1166-0. OCLC 57206438.
- Peris, Nova (1 August 2018). Finding my voice. Sydney: Wilkinson Publishing. ISBN 978-1-925642-50-6. OCLC 57206438.

== Recognition ==
- 1996 – Gold Medal, Women's Hockey, Atlanta 1996 Summer Olympics
- 1997 – Medal of the Order of Australia
- 2001 – Victorian Honour Roll of Women
- 2019 – "Lifetime Achievement" Dreamtime Awards
- 2023 – Sport Australia Hall of Fame inductee

== See also ==
- List of Indigenous Australian politicians
- Dual sport and multi-sport Olympians

Awards
Preceded by Rebecca Chambers	Young Australian of the Year; 1997	Succeeded by Tan Le
