= Fiji Focus =

- "A better Fiji, for you and me"
- Type: bi-monthly
- Owner: Government of Fiji
- Publisher: Ministry of Information
- Founded: June 13, 2009
- Political alignment: Pro-government
- Language: English, Fijian and Hindustani
- Headquarters: Suva
- Website: New Dawn

Fiji Focus is a Fijian bi-monthly newspaper, originally launched as New Dawn by the government of Fiji's Ministry of Information and Archives in June 2009. Its motto is "A better Fiji, for you and me".

== New Dawn ==
Front page of the seventh edition of New Dawn, on September 12, 2009. The main headline is the meeting of Fijian Prime Minister and coup leader Voreqe Bainimarama (left) with Commonwealth envoy Sir Paul Reeves, in talks following Fiji's suspension from the Commonwealth of Nations on September 1. The masthead depicts the coat of arms of Fiji.

The purpose of New Dawn, as stated by interim Prime Minister Voreqe Bainimarama's government, was "to effectively and directly inform Fiji’s citizens of [the government's] numerous policies and programmes". It also contained a section on civil service vacancies. Articles were written in any of Fiji's three official languages - English, Fijian or Hindustani. It was founded with an aim to counter what the authorities described as an anti-government bias in the media. Permanent Secretary for Information Lt.Col. Neumi Leweni stated:

"Much too often the people have learnt of Government policies and programmes of assistance through secondary sources. Information on Government policies, programmes and achievements had always been conveyed to the people largely through the mainstream media. While Government appreciates that some section of the media practice true journalism ethics by focusing on accurate, balanced and responsible reporting, majority of the media organisations have failed miserably to abide by fair and accountable standards."

At that date, however, the media were subject to strict censorship, following the constitutional crisis of April 2009.

The newspaper contained articles highlighting government policies and their effects, with a positive slant. The inaugural edition of the newspaper, on June 13, 2009, included articles entitled "Tourism grows", "US Senator moots new approach to Fiji", "Support for Peoples Charter expands", "Govt to improve services", and "Devaluation positive".

The New Dawn contained twelve pages and was published by Sun News Limited, the publishers of the Fiji Sun. It was also available online on the Fiji government website.

Front page of the first edition of Fiji Focus, on June 12, 2010. The main headline is the concurrent launch of Fiji Today News, a Ministry of Information news programme on Mai TV. The image, however, depicts Permanent Secretary for Information Sharon Smith-Johns viewing the new layout of Fiji Focus at the Ministry. The masthead depicts the national flag.

== From New Dawn to Fiji Focus ==
In the twenty-fourth edition, on 29 May 2010, the publisher's note by Sharon Smith-Johns (Permanent Secretary to the Ministry of Information) stated:

"New Dawn celebrates its first anniversary in June. The establishment of the Government newspaper last year was intended to provide you news on Government’s key programmes, initiatives, and policies that impact Fiji. The objective remains and we hope to continue to improve New Dawn in the coming year. You will see a new look New Dawn appear in the anniversary edition due for publication June 12th."

On June 12, the paper was launched under a new name: Fiji Focus. Smith-Johns' note explained:

"The decision to change the name ‘New Dawn’ to Fiji Focus is [...] timely. We felt that as a Ministry we had moved on from the concept of a new beginning as clearly articulated in the People’s Charter and encapsulated in the name New Dawn to a complete focus on capturing the implementation of the various stages of the People’s Charter and the milestones of the Strategic Framework for Change and Road Map.
Fiji Focus is simply modernising itself to meet the Government’s objectives. Much has been achieved in the past year. The Ministry of Information must continue to be at the forefront of public awareness of Government’s policies, programmes and achievements."

Indeed, unlike New Dawn, the masthead of Fiji Focus identifies it explicitly as "a publication by the Ministry of Information". The motto "A better Fiji, for you and me" is retained. It also retains the other features of New Dawn, including articles in all three national languages, and a list of civil service vacancies. The inaugural edition was twenty pages long.

- List of newspapers in Fiji
