= 2013 Australian federal election =

Election for the 44th Parliament of Australia

- 7 September 2013

All 150 seats in the House of Representatives 76 seats needed for a majority 40 of 76 seats in the Senate
- Opinion polls
- Registered: 14,723,385 ▲4.52%
- Turnout: 13,726,070 (93.23%) (▲0.01 pp)
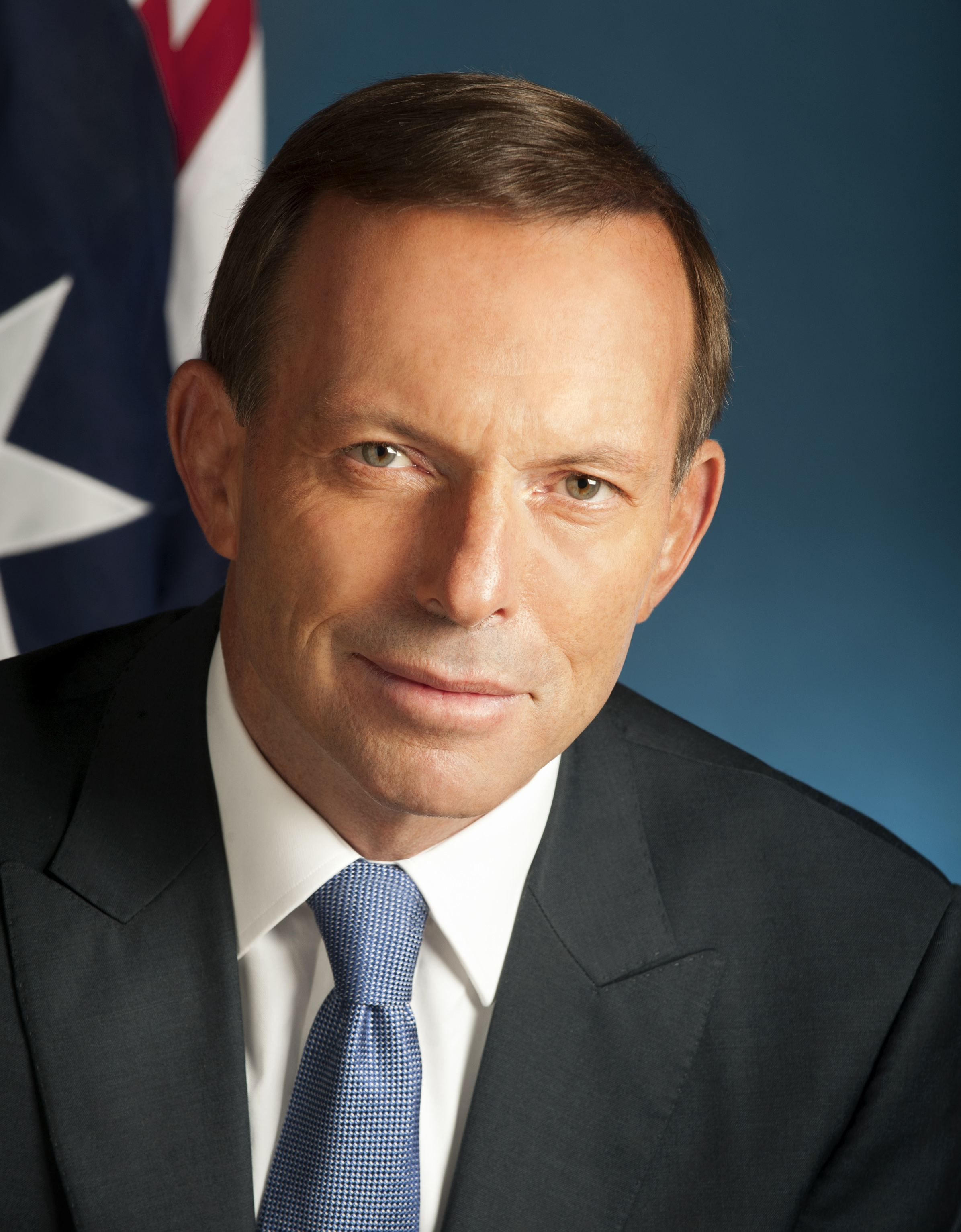

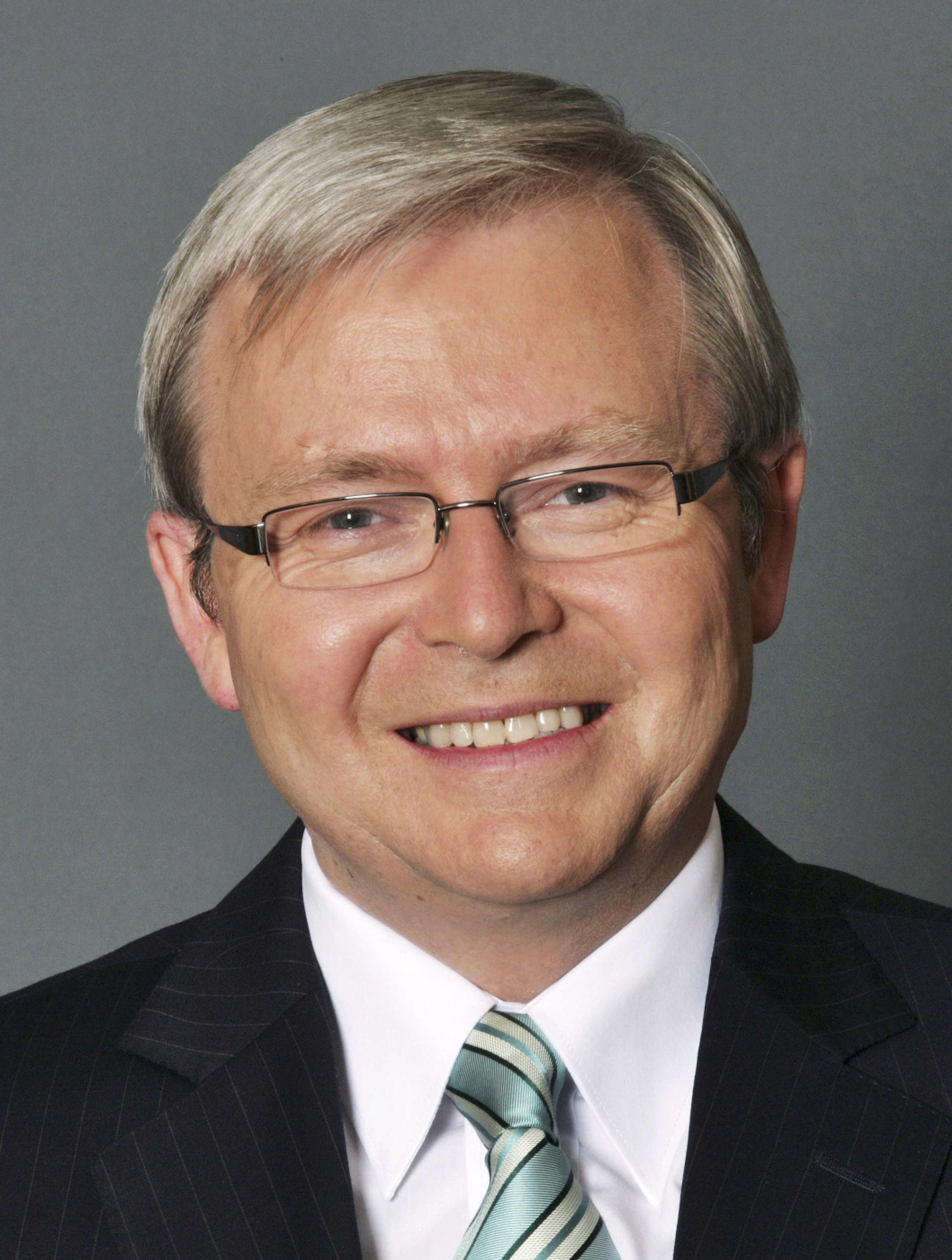

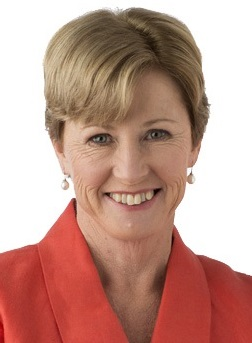

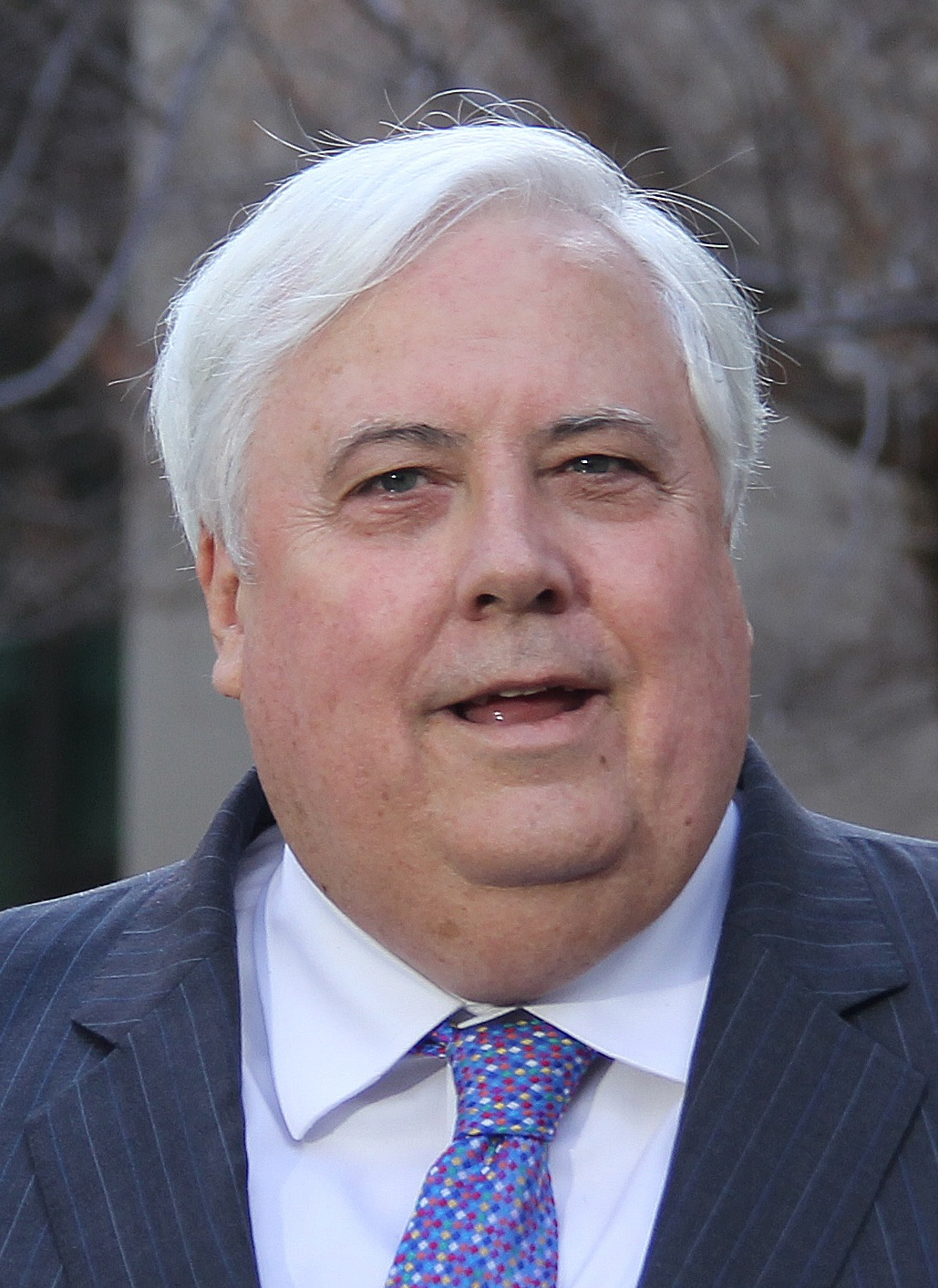

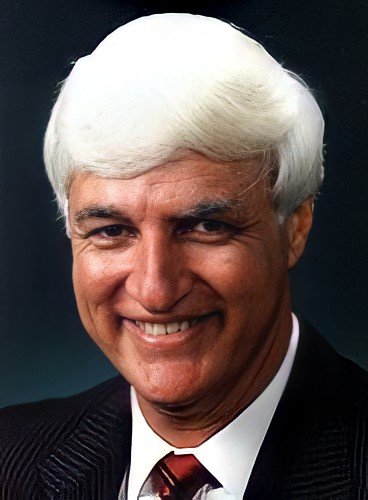
	First party	Second party	Third party
Leader	Tony Abbott	Kevin Rudd	Christine Milne
Party	Coalition	Labor	Greens
Leader since	1 December 2009	26 June 2013	13 March 2012
Leader's seat	Warringah (NSW)	Griffith (Qld.)	Tasmania (Senate)
Last election	72 seats, 43.32%	72 seats, 37.99%	1 seat, 11.76%
Seats before	71 (Note: On 24 November 2011, Peter Slipper (Fisher, Qld) left the Liberal National Party to sit as an independent upon assuming the Speakership.; On 2 May 2012, Tony Crook (O'Connor, WA) joined the Nationals partyroom but remained not a member of the Coalition. He is a member of the WA Nationals which is not a member of the Coalition and previously sat as a crossbencher caucusing separately from the rest of the National Party.)	71 (Note: On 29 April 2012 Craig Thomson (Dobell, NSW) resigned from the Labor Caucus amid the Health Services Union expenses affair to sit as an Independent Labor MP.)	1
Seats won	90	55	1
Seat change	▲19	▼16	Steady
Primary vote	5,882,818	4,311,365	1,116,918
Percentage	45.55%	33.38%	8.65%
Swing	▲1.93	▼4.61	▼3.11
TPP	53.49%	46.51%
TPP swing	▲3.61	▼3.61
	Fourth party	Fifth party	Sixth party
			IND
Leader	Clive Palmer	Bob Katter	—
Party	Palmer United	Katter's Australian	Independents
Leader since	1 April 2013	3 June 2011	—
Leader's seat	Fairfax (Qld.) (won seat)	Kennedy (Qld.)	—
Last election	Did not exist	Did not exist	4 seats
Seats before	0	1	5 (Note: On 5 June 2011, Bob Katter (Kennedy, Qld) created and joined Katter's Australian Party.; On 24 November 2011, Peter Slipper (Fisher, Qld) left the Liberal National Party to sit as an independent upon assuming the Speakership.; On 16 May 2013, Craig Thomson (Dobell, NSW) resigned from the Labor Party for which he was a non-caucusing member to recontest his seat as an independent.)
Seats won	1	1	2
Seat change	▲1	▲1	▼3
Primary vote	709,035	134,226	177,217
Percentage	5.49%	1.04%	1.37%
Swing	▲5.49	▲1.04	▼1.15
- Results by division for the House of Representatives, shaded by winning party's margin of victory.
Prime Minister before election
Kevin Rudd
Labor
Subsequent Prime Minister
Tony Abbott
Liberal/National coalition

A federal election was held on 7 September 2013 to elect the members of the 44th Parliament of Australia. The incumbent Labor government, led by Prime Minister Kevin Rudd, sought to win a third consecutive term, but was defeated by the opposition Liberal–National Coalition, led by Tony Abbott, in a landslide. It was the third instance in Australian history that a party won 90 or more seats at an election.

Labor had been in government for six years since being elected in the 2007 election. This election marked the end of the Rudd-Gillard-Rudd Labor government and the start of the 9 year long Abbott-Turnbull-Morrison Liberal-National Coalition government. Abbott was sworn in by the Governor-General, Quentin Bryce, as Australia's new prime minister on 18 September 2013, along with the Abbott Ministry. The 44th Parliament of Australia opened on 12 November 2013, with the members of the House of Representatives and territory senators sworn in. The state senators were sworn in by the next Governor-General Peter Cosgrove on 7 July 2014, with their six-year terms commencing on 1 July.

The proclamation dissolving the House of Representatives and formally beginning the election period had been issued by Governor-General Bryce on 5 August 2013. The writs of election were subsequently issued by Bryce for the election of members of the House of Representatives and territory senators, and by the state governors for the senators for each state.

Voting in Australia's federal elections has been compulsory since 1925. For the House of Representatives, a preferential ballot system has been in use since 1919, in single-member seats. For the Senate—the proportionally representative upper house—a single transferable vote system has been in use since 1949, with optional group voting tickets since 1984. Elections are conducted by the Australian Electoral Commission (AEC).

A special half-Senate election was conducted on 5 April 2014 in Western Australia as a result of 1,375 lost ballot papers.

Future Opposition Leader Angus Taylor entered parliament at this election.

== Key dates ==
- Governor-General accepted Kevin Rudd's advice to dissolve Parliament and hold a general election – 4 August 2013
- Prorogation of 43rd Parliament – 5:29 pm Monday 5 August 2013
- Dissolution of House of Representatives – 5:30 pm Monday 5 August 2013
- Issue of writs – Monday 5 August 2013
- Close of rolls – 8 pm Monday 12 August 2013
- Close of candidate nominations – 12 noon Thursday 15 August 2013
- Declaration of candidate nominations – 12 noon Friday 16 August 2013
- Election day or Polling day – Saturday 7 September 2013
- Swearing-in of 44th Parliament – Wednesday 18 September 2013
- Last day for the return of writs – Monday 13 November 2013
- Deadline for first meeting of the 44th Parliament – Wednesday 13 December 2013

On 30 January 2013, the then Prime Minister Julia Gillard had announced the election would be held on 14 September. However, following a leadership ballot in June 2013, she was replaced as leader and prime minister by Rudd, who then abandoned the originally planned date. A referendum on amending the constitution to allow the federal government to directly fund local councils, which was initially planned to be held on the same day as the federal election, could not go ahead on the date announced by Rudd. This is because Section 128 of the Constitution of Australia requires that a referendum be submitted to electors between two and six months after its passage through Parliament. As early voting started on 20 August it could not be submitted then.

== 43rd Parliament ==
=== House of Representatives ===
House of Representatives seat numbers prior to the 2013 election Government (71) Labor (71) Opposition Coalition (72) Liberal (44) LNP (20) Nationals (6) Nat. WA (1) CLP (1) Crossbench (7) Ind. (5) Greens (1) KAP (1)

At the 2010 federal election, Labor and the Liberal/National Coalition each won 72 seats in the 150-seat House of Representatives, four short of the requirement for majority government, resulting in the first hung parliament since the 1940 federal election. On the crossbench, one member of the Australian Greens, one member of the National Party of Western Australia and four independent members held the balance of power. After gaining the support of the Greens and three independents on confidence and supply votes, Labor was able to form a minority government with 76 seats, the smallest possible margin in the 150-seat House.

==== Changes in House numbers ====
On 24 November 2011, Harry Jenkins resigned as Speaker of the House of Representatives and returned to the Labor backbench. Later, that day, Deputy Speaker Peter Slipper was elected Speaker and quit the Liberal National Party to become an independent. This changed nominal confidence and supply numbers on the floor of the house from 75–74 to 76–73. In January 2012, Andrew Wilkie withdrew his guarantee of confidence to the incumbent government, changing numbers to 75–73 in the event of his abstention, or 75–74 in the event of his support for a vote of no confidence in the government. In April 2012, Labor's Craig Thomson moved to the crossbenches as an independent MP, and in May, WA National Tony Crook moved from the crossbenches to the Nationals, but did not join the Coalition. Changes brought the government to 71 seats, the Coalition 72 seats and seven crossbenchers. On 9 October 2012, after an unsuccessful vote of no confidence in the speakership, Slipper resigned as Speaker and was replaced by Labor Deputy Speaker Anna Burke. Slipper remained an independent MP.

=== Senate ===
Senate seat numbers prior to the 2013 election Government (31) Labor (31) Opposition Coalition (34) Liberal (24) LNP (6) Nationals (3) CLP (1) Crossbench (11) Greens (9) DLP (1) Ind. (1)

Before the election, the 76-seat Senate was made up of senators from the Coalition (34), Australian Labor Party (31), Australian Greens (9), Democratic Labour Party (1) and one independent senator, Nick Xenophon. The Greens held the sole balance of power. Previously the Greens had held a shared balance of power with the Family First Party and Xenophon.

Of the 76 Senate seats, 40 are contested. This corresponds to half of each state's allocation as well as both senators from the two major territories. Newly elected state senators commenced their terms on 1 July 2014 and the senators of the territories began their terms immediately after their elections.

State/Territory	Seats	ALP	Coalition	Greens	Other
NSW	6	3	3		
VIC	6	3	3		
QLD	6	3	3		
WA	6	2	3	1	
SA	6	2	2	1	1 (Ind., Xenophon)
TAS	6	3	2	1	
ACT	2	1	1		
NT	2	1	1		
To be contested	40	18	18	3	1
Elected in 2010	36	13	16	6	1 (DLP)
Total	76	31	34	9	2

=== Election period ===
On 30 January 2013, at a speech at the National Press Club, Prime Minister Julia Gillard announced the election would be held on Saturday 14 September 2013, although the Governor-General was not formally advised and no writ of election was issued. Kevin Rudd succeeded Julia Gillard as prime minister on 27 June 2013.

The Broadcasting Services Act 1992 was checked by various commercial broadcasting media outlets and media councils as a result of Gillard's announcement. The Act says, in part,

"Election period" means:
(a) in relation to any other election to a Parliament – the period that starts on:
– (i) the day on which the proposed polling day for the election is publicly announced; or
- (ii) the day on which the writs for the election are issued;
whichever happens first, and ends at the close of the poll on the polling day for the election;

— Broadcasting Services Act 1992, Schedule 2, Section 1

and

PART 2
b. (i) If, during an election period, a broadcaster broadcasts election matter, the broadcaster must give reasonable opportunities for the broadcasting of election matter to all political parties contesting the election, being parties which were represented in either House of the Parliament for which the election is to be held at the time of its last meeting before the election period.

— Broadcasting Services Act 1992, Schedule 2, Section 3(2)

This is interpreted as "equal time, over time" rather than equal time in the same broadcast, and that this requirement began with the announcement on 30 January 2013.

== Retiring MPs and senators ==
The terms of members of the House of Representatives who did not renominate ended at the dissolution of the parliament (5 August 2013).

The terms of senators who did not renominate ended on 30 June 2014, unless they represented the Australian Capital Territory or the Northern Territory, in which case their term ended on the day before polling day (6 September 2013). That date also applies to territory senators who contest the election but are defeated.

Members and senators who chose not to renominate are as follows:

=== Independent ===
- Rob Oakeshott MP (Lyne, NSW) – announced retirement 26 June 2013
- Tony Windsor MP (New England, NSW) – announced retirement 26 June 2013

=== Labor ===
- Greg Combet MP (Charlton, NSW) – announced retirement 29 June 2013
- Simon Crean MP (Hotham, VIC) – announced retirement 1 July 2013
- Craig Emerson MP (Rankin, Qld) – announced retirement 26 June 2013
- Martin Ferguson MP (Batman, Vic) – announced retirement 29 May 2013
- Peter Garrett MP (Kingsford Smith, NSW) – announced retirement 26 June 2013
- Steve Gibbons MP (Bendigo, Vic) – announced retirement 29 August 2011
- Julia Gillard MP (Lalor, Vic) – announced retirement 26 June 2013
- Sharon Grierson MP (Newcastle, NSW) – announced retirement 18 July 2012
- Harry Jenkins MP (Scullin, Vic) – announced retirement 26 July 2012
- Kirsten Livermore MP (Capricornia, Qld) – announced retirement 27 November 2012
- Robert McClelland MP (Barton, NSW) – announced retirement 29 January 2013
- Nicola Roxon MP (Gellibrand, VIC) – announced retirement 2 February 2013
- Stephen Smith MP (Perth, WA) – announced retirement 27 June 2013
- Senator Mark Bishop (WA) – announced retirement 15 April 2013
- Senator Trish Crossin (NT) – lost preselection 28 January 2013
- Senator John Hogg (Qld) – announced retirement 10 August 2012

=== Liberal ===
- Joanna Gash MP (Gilmore, NSW) – announced retirement 25 January 2012
- Barry Haase MP (Durack, WA) – announced retirement 15 June 2013
- Judi Moylan MP (Pearce, WA) – announced retirement 28 July 2011
- Alby Schultz MP (Hume, NSW) – announced retirement 17 April 2012
- Patrick Secker MP (Barker, SA) – announced retirement on 25 June 2013
- Alex Somlyay MP (Fairfax, Qld) – announced retirement 25 September 2010
- Mal Washer MP (Moore, WA) – announced retirement 28 July 2011
- Senator Sue Boyce (Qld) – announced retirement 8 October 2012
- Senator Alan Eggleston (WA) – announced retirement 9 April 2012
- Senator Gary Humphries (ACT) – lost preselection 23 February 2013

=== National ===
- John Forrest MP (Mallee, Vic) – announced retirement 6 March 2013
- Paul Neville MP (Hinkler, Qld) − announced retirement 10 October 2012
- Senator Ron Boswell (Qld) – announced retirement 21 September 2012

=== WA Nationals ===
- Tony Crook MP (O'Connor) – announced retirement 9 April 2013

== Electoral events timeline ==
- 30 January – Prime Minister Julia Gillard announces planned election date of 14 September 2013.
- 2 February – Attorney-General Nicola Roxon announces she will be retiring at the election. Higher Education Minister Senator Chris Evans, whose term was not due to finish until 2017, announces he will be resigning in the near future.
- 19 February – Greens leader Christine Milne announces that the alliance agreement with the ALP is over, but her party will not vote against confidence or supply.
- 26 February – Gillard announces she will "campaign" in western Sydney for the following week, from Sunday night until Friday.
- 19 March – Richard Torbay is forced to resign from the Nationals, forfeiting his candidature for the Division of New England. Barnaby Joyce puts his name forward as a possible replacement candidate, hoping to move from the Senate to the House of Representatives.
- 21 March – Former Labor leader, Minister Simon Crean asks Gillard for a party leadership vote, and publicly declares his support for Kevin Rudd. In parliament, the Opposition attempts to suspend standing orders for a no confidence vote and although gaining 73 votes to the government's 71 votes, fails to gain the absolute majority of 76 votes required. Crean is sacked from the ministry. At the leadership ballot no alternative candidate nominates, and Gillard is re-elected as ALP leader unopposed. Rudd supporters Joel Fitzgibbon, Ed Husic, Janelle Saffin and Richard Marles quit their positions in the executive government.
- 22 March – Rudd issues a statement that he will never again return to the ALP leadership. Kim Carr, Martin Ferguson and Chris Bowen quit their ministries.
- 23 March – Key independent MP Andrew Wilkie warns that ongoing instability within the ALP means the government will have difficulty surviving a vote of confidence when parliament resumes in May.
- 2 May – The opposition indicates it will support the Government's National Disability Insurance Scheme policy, including an increase in the Medicare levy from 1.5% to 2%.
- 26 June – Independents Rob Oakeshott and Tony Windsor both announce they won't recontest their seats at the election. Kevin Rudd defeats Julia Gillard in another Labor leadership spill by a 57–45 margin. After the spill, Gillard along with ministers Craig Emerson and Peter Garrett announce their retirement at the coming election.
- 27 June – Rudd is sworn in as prime minister by Governor-General Quentin Bryce, with Anthony Albanese and Chris Bowen sworn in as deputy prime minister and Treasurer respectively. Defence Minister Stephen Smith MP announces his retirement at the coming election.
- 29 June – Greg Combet MP announces his retirement at the coming election.
- 1 July – The Second Rudd Ministry is sworn in. Simon Crean MP announces his retirement at the coming election.
- 1 July – Wikileaks party receives formal registration as a political party.
- 22 July – The ALP caucus approves changes to the way the federal parliamentary leader is chosen. The new rules make it more difficult to change leaders and require a ballot of the party membership on contested leadership spills.
- 4 August – Kevin Rudd announces the election date as 7 September 2013.
- 5 August – Quentin Bryce, the Governor-General, issues the election writ.
- 11 August – The first of three televised leaders debates between Rudd and Abbott is held in Canberra.
- 21 August – The second televised leaders debate between Rudd and Abbott is held in Brisbane.
- 25 August – The Coalition's formal campaign launch is held in Brisbane.
- 27 August – Treasurer Chris Bowen and shadow treasurer Joe Hockey debate at the National Press Club. Later that evening, the third and final televised leaders debate between Rudd and Abbott is held at the Rooty Hill RSL in Sydney.
- 28 August – The Coalition releases a document outlining $31.6 billion of proposed budget savings.
- 29 August – The Rudd government releases several costings estimates which it claims show a $10 billion shortfall in the Coalition's claimed savings released the previous day. In a strongly-worded statement, the secretaries of the Department of Treasury and Department of Finance criticise the use of these confidential costings prepared for the government, re-iterating that the assumptions used differ from the costings prepared for the Coalition.
- 1 September – Labor's formal campaign launch is held in Brisbane.
- 5 September – The Coalition releases its remaining policy costings, claiming a further $9 billion worth of savings, including a $4.5 billion reduction in Australia's foreign aid budget. Later in the day, the Coalition releases a policy document announcing the implementation of an opt-out Internet filter. That evening, Shadow Communications Minister Malcolm Turnbull states that the document was "poorly worded" and released by mistake, and that the Coalition had no such policy.
- 7 September (election day) – The Liberal-National coalition defeats the Australian Labor Party with the Coalition expected to win about 90 seats in the House of Representatives. Kevin Rudd conceded defeat and announced that he would not renominate for the ALP's leadership.
- 18 September – The Abbott Ministry is sworn in by Governor-General Quentin Bryce.
- 17 October – A recount of all "above-the-line" Senate votes made in Western Australia is initiated after an appeal by the WA Greens and the Australian Sports Party is upheld.
- 31 October – The AEC announces that it is unable to find 1,375 ballot papers during the WA Senate recount.
- 31 October – The AEC declares Clive Palmer the winner of the seat of Fairfax, after two recounts, by a margin of 53 votes. Palmer claims the result vindicates his decision to challenge more than half the ballot papers cast.
- 4 November – The AEC declares the result of the WA Senate recount, awarding the last two seats to the Greens and Australian Sports Party, instead of the ALP and Palmer United Party.
- 15 November – The AEC disputes its own declaration of the WA Senate result, by lodging a petition with the Court of Disputed Returns, asking that the WA Senate result be declared null and void.
- January 2014 – Justice Kenneth Hayne, in the Court of Disputed Returns, hears submissions from the AEC and political parties. On 30 January 2014, Hayne reserved his decision.
- 20 February 2014 – The Court of Disputed Returns voids the results of the WA Senate election.
- 21 February 2014 – Electoral Commissioner Ed Killesteyn announces his resignation, to take effect on 4 July 2014.

== Campaign ==
The incumbent Labor-led government argued for a need for a "safe pair of hands" to manage an economic shift from mining-oriented growth to something else; while the opposition said that it would prevent a recession that could be caused by a budget deficit. The Sydney Morning Herald suggested both arguments hedged on the mining boom going bust. Rudd officially began the campaign season on 1 September in his hometown of Brisbane. At the rally, he promised tax breaks for small businesses and more work for local contractors on infrastructure projects. He said: "In this election, we are now engaged in the fight of our lives. It is a fight about the values that underpin Australia's future, a fight about our vision for Australia's future. It's a fight about how we go about building Australia's future, a future for the many, not just for the few." He also dismissed the opinion polls that showed him trailing to Abbott in gaining a parliamentary plurality.

=== Newspaper endorsements ===
The press overwhelmingly favoured the Coalition over Labor, with all of News Corp's publications endorsing Tony Abbott's opposition over Kevin Rudd's government, as well as Fairfax's publications such as The Age, The Sydney Morning Herald and The Canberra Times, backing the Coalition over Labor. Fairfax's newspapers, The Sydney Morning Herald and The Canberra Times both considered the need for political stability a primary reason for supporting the Coalition, as well as criticising Labor's continuing infighting and scandals. The Age backed Labor, praising Labor's stewardship of the economy during the 2008 financial crisis and noting that, of the two parties, they were the one with a vision for Australia. The Sunday Age, however, supported the Coalition, rejecting their daily counterpart's editorial that Labor had vision and that the election amounted to choosing a lesser evil, noting that during the election campaign a "genuine contest of ideas [had] not materialised", that "the campaign [had] contained no vision or policy clarion call commanding our attention and demanding our vote" and subsequently that "in the absence of policies and detailed economic information, voter decisiveness will depend on one issue: trust." During this period, various News Corp's papers published numerous front-page articles supporting The Coalition and denigrating Labor. During the campaign, The Daily Telegraph ran front pages depicting Labor as Nazis, displaying a picture of Rudd above a headline telling readers to "Kick this mob out, and, on election day, ran the headline "After 33 days campaigning, 18 babies kissed, 104,275 km flown and six years of an incompetent Labor government, now it's... your turn." The Sunday Telegraph, meanwhile, printed a front-page editorial with the headline "Australia needs Tony". Additionally, The Courier-Mail used a front page to depict Labor as clowns, and ran a headline of "Does This Guy Ever Shut Up" alongside a photo of Rudd during a debate. Similarly, in the weeks preceding the election, the Herald Sun ran the headline "Trust Me" alongside a photo Abbott and on the day of the election ran a front page consisting of the headline "It's Tony's Time" alongside another photo of Abbott.

==== National daily newspapers ====
Newspaper	Publisher	2013 endorsement	Link	2010 endorsement	Link
The Advertiser	News Corp Australia	Coalition		Labor	
The Age	Fairfax Media	Labor		Labor	
The Australian	News Corp Australia	Coalition		Coalition	
The Australian Financial Review	Fairfax Media	Coalition		Coalition	
The Canberra Times	Fairfax Media	Coalition		Labor	
The Courier-Mail	News Corp Australia	Coalition		Coalition	
The Daily Telegraph	News Corp Australia	Coalition		Coalition	
The Guardian Australia	Guardian Media Group	Labor		N/A	
The Herald Sun	News Corp Australia	Coalition		Coalition	
The Mercury	News Corp Australia	Coalition		Labor	
Northern Territory News	News Corp Australia	Coalition		Labor	
The Sydney Morning Herald	Fairfax Media	Coalition		Labor	
The West Australian	Seven West Media	Coalition		Coalition	

==== National Sunday newspapers ====
Newspaper	Publisher	2013 endorsement	2010 endorsement	Link
The Sunday Age	Fairfax Media	Coalition	Labor	
The Weekend Australian	News Corp Australia	Coalition	Coalition	
The Sunday Mail	News Corp Australia	Coalition	Coalition	
The Sunday Telegraph	News Corp Australia	Coalition	Labor	
The Sunday Herald Sun	News Corp Australia	Coalition	Labor	

==== International and foreign press ====
Newspaper	Endorsement	Link
Fiji Sun	Coalition	
The Economist	Labor	

== Opinion polls ==
Two-party-preferred.

Primary vote.

Aggregate of voting intention polls between the 2013 election and the previous election. A local regressions (LOESS) is shown in a solid line.
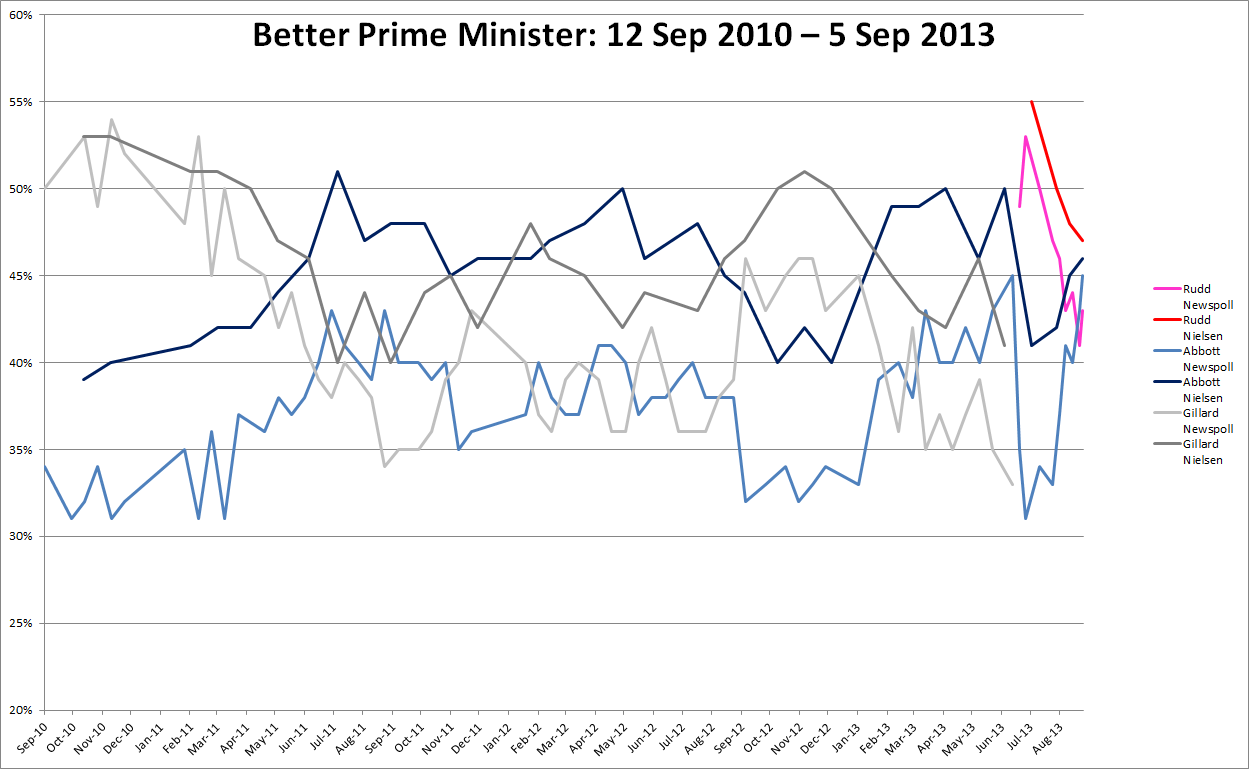
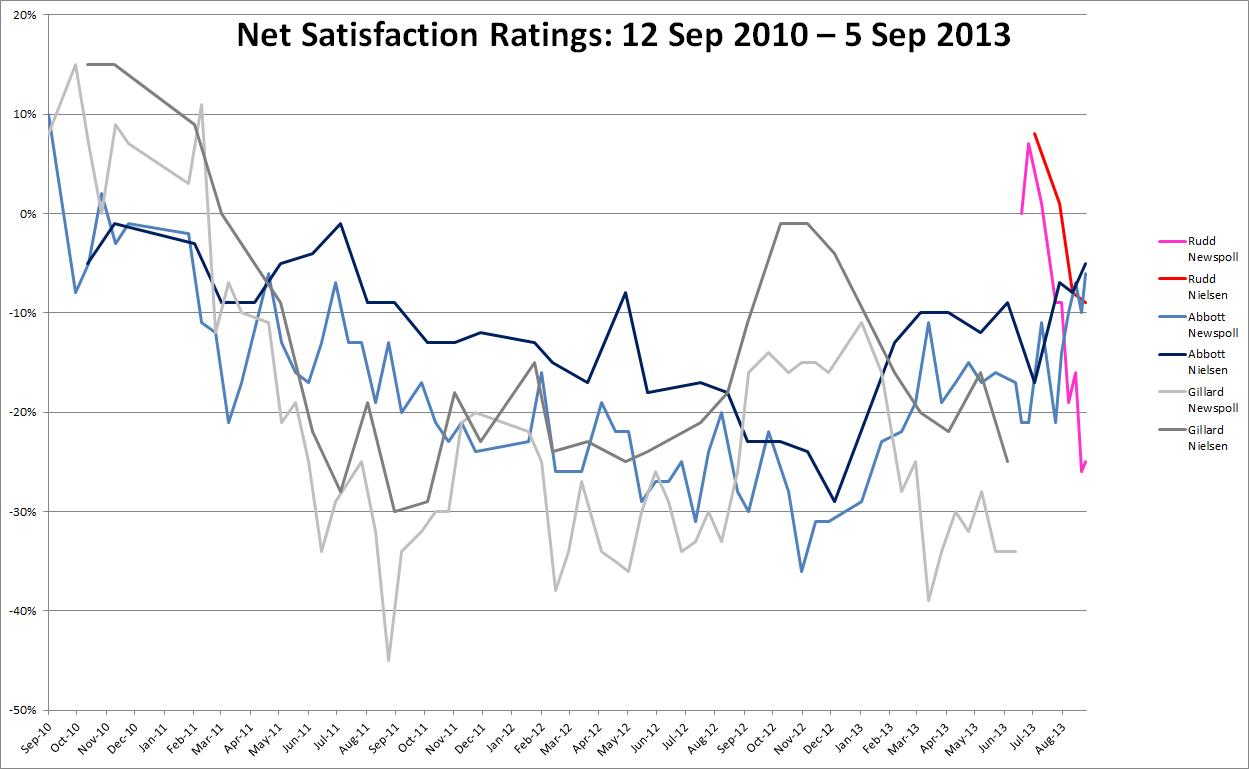

== Results ==
=== House of Representatives ===
Government (90) Coalition Liberal (58) LNP (22) National (9) CLP (1) Opposition (55) Labor (55) Crossbench (5) Green (1) Palmer (1) Katter (1) Independent (2) (Note: The two independents elected were: Cathy McGowan Andrew Wilkie (first elected in 2010))

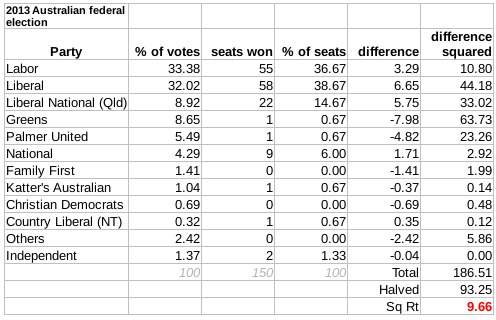
The disproportionality of the lower house in the 2013 election was 9.66 according to the Gallagher index, mainly between the Coalition and Green parties.

House of Representatives (IRV) Turnout 93.23% (CV) — Informal 5.91%
Party	Votes	%	Swing	Seats	Change
Labor	4,311,365	33.38	−4.61	55	▼16
Coalition	5,882,818	45.55	+2.23	90	▲19
Liberal	4,134,865	32.02	+1.56	58	▲14
Liberal National	1,152,217	8.92	−0.20	22	▲2
National	554,268	4.29	+0.56	9	▲2
Country Liberal (NT)	41,468	0.32	+0.01	1	Steady
Greens	1,116,918	8.65	−3.11	1	Steady
Palmer United	709,035	5.49	+5.49	1	▲1
Family First	181,820	1.41	−0.84		
Katter's Australian	134,226	1.04	+0.73	1	▲1
Independents	177,217	1.37	−1.15	2	▼4
Others	401,528	3.11			
Total	12,914,927			150	
Two-party-preferred vote
Liberal/National Coalition	6,908,710	53.49	+3.61	90	▲18
Labor	6,006,217	46.51	−3.61	55	▼17
Invalid/blank votes	811,143	5.91	+0.36		
Registered voters/turnout	14,723,385	93.23			
Source: Federal Election 2013

Popular vote
Labor	33.38%
Liberal	32.02%
LNP (QLD)	8.92%
Greens	8.65%
Palmer United	5.49%
National	4.29%
Family First	1.41%
Katter's Australian	1.04%
CLP	0.32%
Independent	1.37%
Other	3.11%

Two-party-preferred vote
Coalition	53.49%
Labor	46.51%

Parliament seats
Coalition	60.00%
Labor	36.67%
Greens	0.67%
Palmer United	0.67%
Katter's Australian	0.67%
Independent	1.33%

=== Senate ===
Government (33) Coalition Liberal (23) LNP (6) National (3) CLP (1) Opposition (25) Labor (25) Crossbench (18) Green (10) Palmer (2) Motoring (1) Liberal Democrat (1) Family First (1) DLP (1) Independent (2)

This table includes votes and percentage from the 2013 election and the seat allocation is based on the void election in Western Australia. The 2014 Australian Senate special election in Western Australia includes the revised national totals after that election.

Senate (STV GV) — Turnout 93.88% (CV) — Informal 2.96%
Party	Votes	%	Swing	Seats won	Total seats	Change
Liberal/National joint ticket (Note: The Liberal and National parties ran a joint ticket in New South Wales and Victoria. It includes the Liberal National Party in Queensland.)	3,938,204	29.36	–0.04	8	16	▼1
Liberal (Note: The Liberals-only ticket ran in Western Australia, South Australia, Tasmania and the Australian Capital Territory.)	1,006,710	7.51	+1.08	8	16	Steady
National (Note: The Nationals-only ticket ran in Western Australia and South Australia.)	69,523	0.52	–0.19	0	0	Steady
Country Liberal (NT)	42,781	0.32	–0.01	1	1	Steady
Coalition total	5,057,218	37.70	–0.92	17	33	▼1
Labor	4,038,591	30.11	–5.02	12	25	▼6
Greens	1,159,588	8.65	–4.46	4	10	▲1
Palmer United	658,976	4.91	+4.91	2	2	▲2
Liberal Democratic Party	523,831	3.91	+2.10	1	1	▲1
Xenophon Group	258,376	1.93	+1.93	1	1	Steady
Family First	149,306	1.11	–0.99	1	1	▲1
Motoring Enthusiasts	67,560	0.50	+0.50	1	1	▲1
Others	1,499,570	11.18				
Total	13,413,016			40	76	
Invalid/blank votes	409,149	2.96	–0.79			
Registered voters/turnout	14,086,869	93.71				
Source: Commonwealth Election 2013

The Senate has 76 seats. Forty seats were up for election; six in each of the six states, two for the ACT and two for the Northern Territory. The terms of the four senators from the territories commenced on election day. The terms of the six longest-serving state senators ended on 30 June 2014; the terms of the new state senators commenced on 1 July 2014, and were originally supposed to end on 30 June 2020—however, the entire Senate was dissolved at the double-dissolution 2016 election.

The Senate saw the Coalition government on 33 seats with the Labor opposition on 25 seats, the Greens on 10 seats and a crossbench of eight—Palmer United on three seats, with other minor parties and independents on five seats (the LDP's David Leyonhjelm, Family First's Bob Day, Motoring's Ricky Muir and incumbents Nick Xenophon and the DLP's John Madigan). Muir announced he would vote in line with Palmer United. The initial election saw Wayne Dropulich of the Australian Sports Party win a seat in Western Australia, but the subsequent voiding of the result and ensuing special election saw the Palmer United Party gain a third seat. The Coalition government required the support of at least six non-coalition senators to pass legislation.

A record number of candidates stood at the election. Group voting tickets came under scrutiny because multiple candidates were provisionally elected with the vast majority of their 14.3 per cent quotas coming from the preferences of other parties across the political spectrum. "Preference whisperer" Glenn Druery organised tight cross-preferencing between over 30 minor parties as part of his Minor Party Alliance. Sports' Wayne Dropulich won a Senate seat on a record-low primary vote of 0.2 per cent in Western Australia, his party placing 21st out of 28 groups on primary votes. Motoring's Ricky Muir won a senate seat on a record-low primary vote of 0.5 per cent in Victoria. Family First's Bob Day won a seat on a primary vote of 3.8 per cent in South Australia. All three were involved with the Minor Party Alliance. Previous examples of winning with low vote shares include Family First's Steve Fielding in 2004 on 1.9 per cent in Victoria, the Nuclear Disarmament Party's Robert Wood in 1987 on 1.5 per cent in New South Wales, and the DLP's John Madigan won his seat in 2010 on a primary vote of 2.3 per cent in Victoria. Xenophon and larger parties including the incoming government announced they would look at changes to the GVT system.

==== Western Australia special Senate election ====
Revised national Senate totals following WA special election (STV GV) Turnout 93.45% (CV) – Informal 2.93%
Party	Votes	%	Swing	Seats won	Continuing senators	Total seats	Change
Liberal/National joint ticket	3,938,204	29.43	–0.03	8	8	16	▼1
Liberal	928,291	6.94	–1.65	8	8	16	Steady
National	41,920	0.31	–0.19	0	0	0	Steady
Country Liberal (NT)	42,781	0.32	–0.01	1	1	1	Steady
Coalition total	4,951,196	37.00	–1.29	17	16	33	▼1
Australian Labor Party	3,965,284	29.63	–5.50	12	13	25	▼6
Australian Greens	1,234,592	9.23	–3.88	4	6	10	▲1
Palmer United Party	751,121	5.61	+5.61	3	–	3	▲3
Liberal Democratic Party	502,180	3.75	+1.94	1	–	1	▲1
Xenophon Group	258,376	1.93	+1.93	1	–	1	Steady
Family First Party	149,994	1.12	–0.98	1	–	1	▲1
Democratic Labour Party	115,276	0.86	–0.20	0	1	1	Steady
Australian Motoring Enthusiast Party	66,807	0.50	+0.50	1	–	1	▲1
Other	1,385,719	10.36	+0.49				
Total	13,380,545			40	36	76	
Invalid/blank votes	403,380	2.93	–0.82				
Registered voters/turnout	14,750,392	93.45					
Source: Commonwealth Election 2013

Most Senate votes cast in Western Australia were subject to a formal recount. During the recount it was determined that 1,375 WA Senate ballot papers could not be located. After the final recount the result was duly declared which changed the last two predicted WA Senate spots from Palmer and Labor back to Sports and Green. Mick Keelty, a former AFP Commissioner, was requested by the AEC to investigate the issue of the misplaced ballot papers. On 15 November, the AEC petitioned the High Court, acting as the Court of Disputed Returns, to seek an order from the court that the WA Senate election of all six senators (3 Liberal, 1 Labor, 1 Green, 1 Sport) be declared void. On 18 February 2014, it was announced that the Court of Disputed Returns had found that the result of the Western Australia Senate election should be voided, meaning a fresh election for all six senate vacancies would be required.

The AEC notes that the Court has advised in its written decision issued today that it finds that the only relief appropriate is for the 2013 Western Australian Senate election result to be declared void.......In accordance with the Australian Constitution and the requirements of the Western Australian Election of Senators Act 1903, an election of six senators for Western Australia would occur once a writ has been issued by His Excellency Mr Malcolm McCusker AC CVO QC, the Governor of Western Australia.

— Australian Electoral Commission, 18 February 2014

On 28 February 2014 it was announced that the half-Senate election in Western Australia would take place on 5 April, which returned 3 Liberal, 1 Labor, 1 Green, 1 Palmer.

== Seats changing hands ==
Members listed in italics did not re-contest their House of Representatives seats at this election.

Seat	2010			Swing	2013		
Seat	Party	Member	Margin	Swing	Margin	Member	Party
Banks, NSW	Labor	Daryl Melham	1.45	−3.28	1.83	David Coleman	Liberal
Barton, NSW	Labor	Robert McClelland	6.86	−7.17	0.31	Nickolas Varvaris	Liberal
Bass, TAS	Labor	Geoff Lyons	6.74	−10.78	4.04	Andrew Nikolic	Liberal
Braddon, TAS	Labor	Sid Sidebottom	7.48	−10.04	2.56	Brett Whiteley	Liberal
Capricornia, QLD	Labor	Kirsten Livermore	3.68	−4.45	0.77	Michelle Landry	Liberal National
Corangamite, VIC	Labor	Darren Cheeseman	0.28	−4.22	3.94	Sarah Henderson	Liberal
Deakin, VIC	Labor	Mike Symon	0.60	−3.78	3.18	Michael Sukkar	Liberal
Dobell, NSW	Independent	Craig Thomson	5.07	N/A	0.68	Karen McNamara	Liberal
Eden-Monaro, NSW	Labor	Mike Kelly	4.24	−4.85	0.61	Peter Hendy	Liberal
Fairfax, QLD	Liberal National	Alex Somlyay	6.95	N/A	0.03	Clive Palmer	Palmer United
Fisher, QLD	Independent	Peter Slipper	4.13	N/A	9.75	Mal Brough	Liberal National
Hindmarsh, SA	Labor	Steve Georganas	6.08	−7.97	1.89	Matt Williams	Liberal
Indi, VIC	Liberal	Sophie Mirabella	9.94	N/A	0.25	Cathy McGowan	Independent
La Trobe, VIC	Labor	Laura Smyth	1.66	−5.67	4.01	Jason Wood	Liberal
Lindsay, NSW	Labor	David Bradbury	1.12	−4.11	2.99	Fiona Scott	Liberal
Lyne, NSW	Independent	Rob Oakeshott	12.73	N/A	14.77	David Gillespie	National
Lyons, TAS	Labor	Dick Adams	12.29	−13.51	1.22	Eric Hutchinson	Liberal
New England, NSW	Independent	Tony Windsor	21.52	N/A	14.46	Barnaby Joyce	National
O'Connor, WA	National WA	Tony Crook	3.56	−4.51	0.95	Rick Wilson	Liberal
Page, NSW	Labor	Janelle Saffin	4.19	−6.71	2.52	Kevin Hogan	National
Petrie, QLD	Labor	Yvette D'Ath	2.51	−3.04	0.53	Luke Howarth	Liberal National
Reid, NSW	Labor	John Murphy	2.68	−3.53	0.85	Craig Laundy	Liberal
Robertson, NSW	Labor	Deborah O'Neill	1.00	−4.00	3.00	Lucy Wicks	Liberal

== Result commentary ==
The Labor Party recorded its lowest two-party preferred vote since 1996 and lowest primary vote since 1931. Kevin Rudd announced his resignation as party leader and confirmed he would not run again in the subsequent leadership election.

With Nova Peris's victory in the Senate election in the Northern Territory, she became the first Aboriginal woman to be elected to parliament. Julian Assange failed to be elected to the Senate after running in Victoria, with his WikiLeaks Party garnering 0.62% of the popular vote. Former Queensland Premier Peter Beattie, standing in the Liberal-held seat of Forde, also failed to enter parliament.

In an unprecedented outcome in Australian electoral history, the Senate result in Western Australia was declared void after the loss of over 1,300 ballot papers, necessitating a fresh election for the Senate in that state.

Rudd suffered a large swing against him in his seat of Griffith, which was large enough for the LNP candidate, Bill Glasson, to have a higher first-preference vote than Rudd, although Rudd eventually won the seat on preferences.

As of 2025, the 2013 election was the most recent time the Coalition saw an increase in the first preference vote in the House of Representatives.

== Aftermath ==
The Coalition had campaigned on a tough stance on asylum seekers who came to Australia by boat (as had the Labor Party in the final weeks leading up to the election). Immediately after the election, Abbott reiterated his party's promise and announced that his new government would begin Operation Sovereign Borders—which would turn back any vessels carrying asylum seekers—as soon as possible. He also confirmed he would abolish the carbon price that was introduced by the Gillard government, as well as lower foreign aid by A$4.5 billion.

== Reactions ==
=== International reactions ===
- Fiji: Fijian Prime Minister Frank Bainimarama congratulated Abbott for his victory and hoped he would normalise relations between the two countries after the 2006 Fijian coup d'état, which caused Australia to sanction Fiji. Bainimarama previously criticised the sanctions and said relations would improve if Abbott replaced Rudd as prime minister. Many Fijian newspapers endorsed Abbott for the election, with the Fiji Sun printing an editorial titled "Abbott for PM".
