= List of newspapers in Fiji =

This is a list of newspapers in Fiji.

- Fiji Focus
- Fiji Live
- Fiji Samachar
- Fiji Sun (in English)
- Fiji Times (since 1869; daily, in English)
- Fiji Village
- The Jet Newspaper (monthly, in English)
- Sartaj (weekly, in Hindi)
- Shanti Dut (weekly, in Hindi)
- The Stallion
- South Sea Times
- Nai Lalakai
- Kaila
- Fiji Newswire
- Fiji One
- Fiji Broadcasting Corporation
- Duavata Broadcasting Company
- Islands Business (magazine)
- Mai Life (magazine)

== See also ==
- Lists of newspapers
- List of newspapers in Australia
- List of newspapers in Britain
- List of magazines in Australia
- List of magazines in Britain
