= The Jet Newspaper =

The Jet Newspaper is a community newspaper published in Fiji since October 2009, it is the first and only community newspaper in Fiji with a worldwide reach and is operating from the Nadi, Fiji. The newspaper is published and released every week and also an Internet edition is published and updated daily, this newspaper has tremendous support from Nadi Town Council and Nadi Chamber of Commerce.

== See also ==
- Fiji Times
- Fiji Sun
- Fiji Village
- Fiji Live
