= Opinion polling for the 2013 Australian federal election =

This article collates results of opinion polls that were conducted in relation to voting intentions of the Australian public in the lead-up to the 2013 Australian federal election.

== Polling firms ==
Galaxy Research, Newspoll, and Nielsen Australia conduct telephone polls of federal voting intentions. Essential Research reports a rolling average of its two most recent polls, which are conducted each weekend using online surveys.

Through late February 2013, Roy Morgan Research released separate polls conducted by face-to-face interviews and telephone polling. Face-to-face polling was conducted each weekend, though the data published was usually an average of two weeks' polling. Telephone polls were conducted sporadically. Since the end of February 2013, Morgan has released a "multi-mode" poll, consisting of face-to-face, online, and SMS polling.

All of the firms report two-party-preferred vote estimates calculated according to the flow of preferences at the last election. Roy Morgan additionally reports two-party preferred estimates calculated according to respondents' reported preferences (which is usually reported as the head line number in Roy Morgan publications). To ensure comparability between the results reported by different firms, the tables and charts below report only two-party-preferred vote estimates calculated according to the first method.

The polls reported here typically have sample sizes in excess of 1,000, with margins of error of approximately three per cent.

Since the 2010 election, voters were regularly polled as to which party they would vote for were an election held on the day of the survey: Labor (ALP), the Coalition, the Greens, or some other candidate. Each firm reports its calculation of the two-party preferred vote (TPP) based on the flow of preferences at the previous election.

Sources for Galaxy, Essential, and Nielsen are provided for each poll; Newspoll and Morgan maintain databases of their polling.

== Graphical summary ==
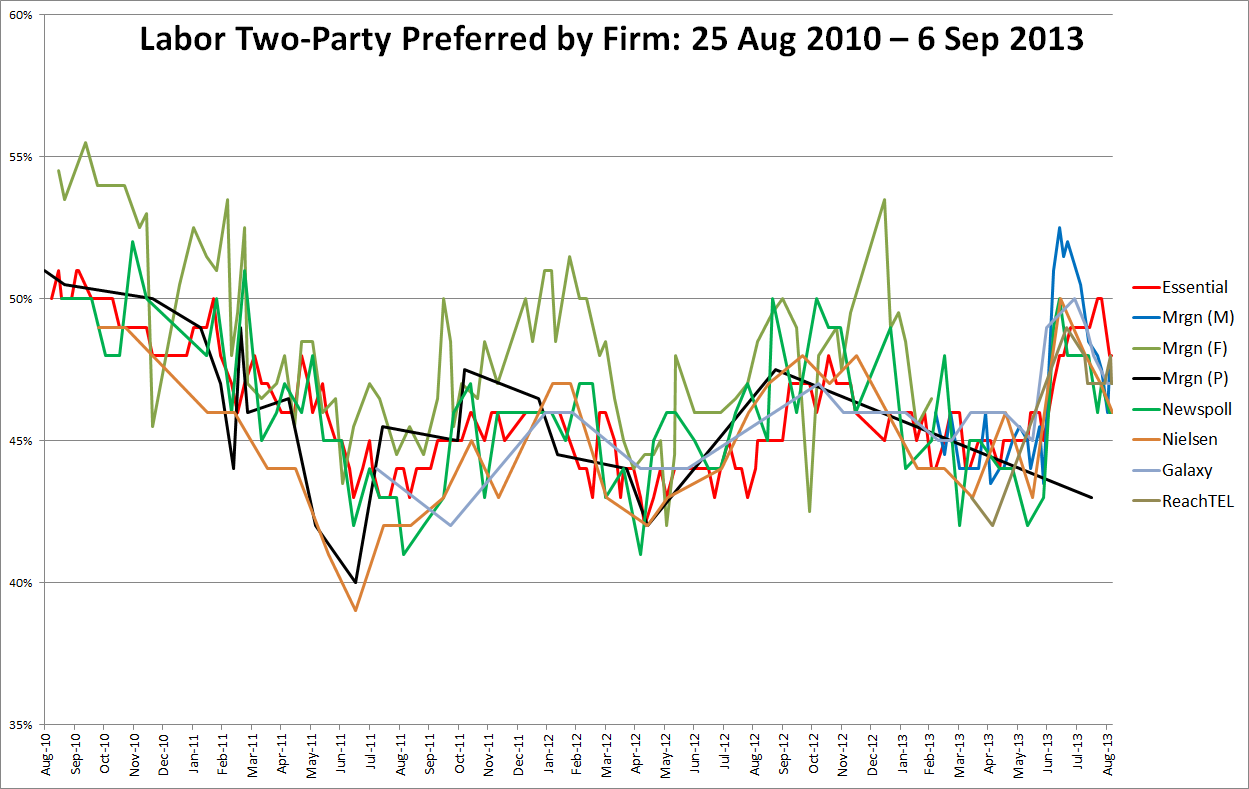

== Voting intention ==
Date	Firm	Sample size	Primary vote							TPP vote	
Date	Firm	Sample size	L/NP	ALP	GRN	PUP	KAP	IND	OTH	ALP	L/NP
7 Sep 2013	2013 election		45.5%	33.4%	8.6%	5.5%	1.0%	1.4%	4.5%	46.5%	53.5%
7 Sep 2013	Morgan (exit poll 2)	—N/a	42%	33.5%	11%	5%	—N/a	—N/a	8%	48%	52%
7 Sep 2013	Morgan (exit poll 1)	—N/a	42%	34.5%	11%	5%	—N/a	—N/a	7.5%	48%	52%
4 – 6 Sep 2013	Morgan	4,937	44%	31.5%	10.5%	6.5%	1%	—N/a	6.5%	46.5%	53.5%
5 Sep 2013	ReachTEL	3,512	43.5%	33.7%	10.2%	7.0%	1.1%	—N/a	4.6%	47%	53%
5 Sep 2013	Lonergan	862	42%	34%	14%	—N/a	—N/a	—N/a	10%	49.2%	50.8%
4 – 5 Sep 2013	Nielsen	1,431	46%	33%	11%	4%	1%	2%	2%	46%	54%
3 – 5 Sep 2013	Newspoll	2,511	46%	33%	9%	—N/a	—N/a	—N/a	12%	46%	54%
2 – 4 Sep 2013	Galaxy	1,503	45%	35%	9%	5%	—N/a	—N/a	6%	47%	53%
1 – 4 Sep 2013	Essential	1,035	43%	35%	10%	—N/a	—N/a	—N/a	10%	48%	52%
30 Aug – 2 Sep 2013	AMR	1,101	44%	34%	10%	—N/a	—N/a	—N/a	12%	47%	53%

== Sub-national polling ==
=== Queensland ===
Date	Firm	Sample size	Primary vote							TPP vote	
Date	Firm	Sample size	LNP	ALP	GRN	PUP	KAP	IND	OTH	LNP	ALP
7 Sep 2013	2013 election		45.7%	29.8%	6.2%	11.0%	3.7%	0.4%	3.2%	57.0%	43.0%
7 Sep 2013	Morgan (exit poll)	—N/a	—N/a	—N/a	—N/a	9.5%	—N/a	—N/a	—N/a	—N/a	—N/a

== Data table ==
House of Representatives (lower house) polling
Date	Firm	Primary vote				TPP vote
		L/NP^{*}	Labor	Green	Other	Labor	L/NP
4–6 Sep 2013	Morgan (multi)	45%	31.5%	9.5%	14%	44.5%	54.5%
5 Sep 2013	ReachTEL	43.5%	33.7%	10.2%	12.7%	47%	53%
4–5 Sep 2013	Nielsen	46%	33%	11%	10%	46%	54%
3–5 Sep 2013	Newspoll	46%	33%	9%	12%	46%	54%
4 Sep 2013	ReachTEL	43.6%	32.7%	10.0%	13.7%	47%	53%
2–4 Sep 2013	Galaxy	45%	35%	9%	11%	47%	53%
1–4 Sep 2013	Essential	43%	35%	10%	12%	48%	52%
3 Sept 2013	ReachTEL	44.2%	35.3%	9.7%	10.7%	48%	52%
30 Aug–1 Sep 2013	Morgan (multi)	43%	34%	11%	12%	48%	52%
30 Aug–1 Sep 2013	Newspoll	46%	33%	10%	11%	46%	54%
29 Aug–1 Sep 2013	Essential (Note: "Essential Report" (PDF). Essential Research. 2 September 2013.)	44%	35%	11%	10%	48%	52%
28–29 Aug 2013	Galaxy	46%	35%	10%	9%	47%	53%
28–29 Aug 2013	Morgan (multi)	44%	30.5%	12%	13.5%	46%	54%
26 Aug 2013	ReachTEL	46.5%	35.7%	10.1%	7.7%	47%	53%
21–25 Aug 2013	Essential	43%	38%	11%	9%	50%	50%
23–25 Aug 2013	Newspoll	47%	37%	9%	7%	47%	53%
23–25 Aug 2013	Morgan (multi)	45%	34.5%	11%	9.5%	47.5%	52.5%
18–22 Aug 2013	Nielsen	47%	35%	10%	7%	47%	53%
16–18 Aug 2013	Newspoll	47%	34%	9%	10%	46%	54%
16–18 Aug 2013	Morgan (multi)	44.5%	36.5%	9.5%	9.5%	48%	52%
16–18 Aug 2013	AMR	41%	38%	10%	11%	50%	50%
14–18 Aug 2013	Essential	44%	40%	8%	8%	50%	50%
14–15 Aug 2013	Galaxy	45%	36%	10%	9%	48%	52%
12–13 Aug 2013	Morgan (phone)	52%	31%	9%	8%	43%	57%
9–12 Aug 2013	Essential (Note: "Essential Report" (PDF). Essential Research. 13 August 2013.)	43%	39%	8%	10%	49%	51%
9–11 Aug 2013	Newspoll	46%	35%	11%	8%	48%	52%
9–11 Aug 2013	Morgan (multi)	44%	36.5%	10.5%	9%	48.5%	51.5%
10 Aug 2013	ReachTEL	46.9%	36.9%	8.9%	7.4%	47%	53%
7–9 Aug 2013	Galaxy	45%	38%	10%	7%	49%	51%
6–8 Aug 2013	Nielsen	46%	37%	10%	8%	48%	52%
4 Aug 2013	ReachTEL	45.7%	37.5%	8.2%	8.6%	48%	52%
2–4 Aug 2013	Morgan (multi)	43%	38%	9.5%	9.5%	49.5%	50.5%
2–4 Aug 2013	Newspoll	44%	37%	9%	10%	48%	52%
1–4 Aug 2013	Essential	43%	38%	9%	10%	49%	51%
26–28 Jul 2013	Morgan (multi)	41.5%	38.5%	10.5%	9.5%	50.5%	49.5%
25–28 Jul 2013	Essential	44%	39%	9%	8%	49%	51%
23–25 Jul 2013	Galaxy	44%	40%	9%	7%	50%	50%
18–22 Jul 2013	Essential	45%	39%	7%	9%	49%	51%
19–21 Jul 2013	Morgan (multi)	41%	41.5%	9%	8.5%	52%	48%
19–21 Jul 2013	Newspoll	45%	37%	10%	8%	48%	52%
18 Jul 2013	ReachTEL	45.4%	39.3%	8.3%	7.0%	49%	51%
12–14 Jul 2013	Morgan (multi)	41%	42%	7%	10%	51.5%	48.5%
11–14 Jul 2013	Essential	46%	39%	7%	8%	48%	52%
11–13 Jul 2013	Nielsen	44%	39%	9%	8%	50%	50%
5–8 Jul 2013	AMR	43%	42%	7%	8%	51%	49%
5–7 Jul 2013	Newspoll	42%	38%	9%	11%	50%	50%
5–7 Jul 2013	Morgan (multi)	39.5%	41.5%	8.5%	10.5%	52.5%	47.5%
4–7 Jul 2013	Essential	46%	38%	8%	7%	48%	52%
28–30 Jun 2013	Newspoll	43%	35%	11%	11%	49%	51%
28–30 Jun 2013	Morgan (multi)	40.5%	39.5%	8.5%	11.5%	51%	49%
27–30 Jun 2013	Essential	46%	36%	9%	9%	47%	53%
27–28 Jun 2013	Galaxy	44%	38%	10%	8%	49%	51%
27 Jun 2013	ReachTEL	45.1%	38.3%	8.7%	7.8%	48%	52%
26 June 2013	Kevin Rudd is elected Prime Minister in Labor leadership spill
21–23 Jun 2013	Newspoll	48%	29%	9%	14%	43%	57%
21–23 Jun 2013	Morgan (multi)	47%	30.5%	9%	13.5%	43.5%	56.5%
20–23 Jun 2013	Essential	47%	34%	8%	11%	45%	55%
14–16 Jun 2013	Morgan (multi)	44.5%	33%	9%	13.5%	45.5%	54.5%
13–16 Jun 2013	Essential (Note: "Essential Report" (PDF). Essential Research. 17 June 2013.)	47%	35%	8%	9%	46%	54%
13–15 Jun 2013	Nielsen	47%	29%	11%	12%	43%	57%
11–13 Jun 2013	Galaxy	47%	32%	11%	10%	45%	55%
7–10 Jun 2013	Morgan (multi)	46%	31%	9.5%	13.5%	44%	56%
6–10 Jun 2013	Essential	47%	36%	8%	9%	46%	54%
31 May–2 Jun 2013	Newspoll	49%	30%	9%	12%	42%	58%
31 May–2 Jun 2013	Morgan (multi)	45.5%	31.5%	9.5%	13.5%	44.5%	55.5%
30 May–2 Jun 2013	Essential (Note: "Essential Report" (PDF). Essential Research. 3 June 2013.)	48%	35%	8%	9%	45%	55%
24–26 May 2013	Morgan (multi)	45.5%	33.5%	9.5%	11.5%	45.5%	54.5%
23–26 May 2013	Essential (Note: "Essential Report" (PDF). Essential Research. 27 May 2013.)	48%	34%	8%	10%	45%	55%
17–19 May 2013	Newspoll	46%	31%	9%	14%	44%	56%
17–19 May 2013	Morgan (multi)	45.5%	32%	10%	12.5%	45%	55%
16–19 May 2013	Essential	48%	35%	8%	9%	45%	55%
16–18 May 2013	Nielsen	44%	32%	11%	13%	46%	54%
15–16 May 2013	Galaxy	46%	34%	10%	10%	46%	54%
10–12 May 2013	Morgan (multi)	46.5%	32%	9.5%	12%	44%	56%
9–12 May 2013	Essential	48%	34%	9%	10%	45%	55%
3–5 May 2013	Newspoll	47%	31%	10%	12%	44%	56%
3–5 May 2013	Morgan (multi)	46%	32%	8.5%	13.5%	44%	56%
2–5 May 2013	Essential	48%	33%	9%	10%	44%	56%
2 May 2013	ReachTEL	48.5%	29.3%	10.2%	11.9%	42%	58%
26–28 Apr 2013	Morgan (multi)	48%	30.5%	11%	10.5%	43.5%	56.5%
25–28 Apr 2013	Essential	48%	34%	9%	9%	45%	55%
18–22 Apr 2013	Morgan (multi)	44%	32.5%	10.5%	13%	46%	54%
18–22 Apr 2013	Essential	48%	34%	9%	9%	45%	55%
19–21 Apr 2013	Newspoll	46%	32%	10%	12%	45%	55%
11–14 Apr 2013	Morgan (multi)	47.5%	32%	10.5%	10%	44%	56%
11–14 Apr 2013	Essential	48%	34%	9%	9%	45%	55%
11–13 Apr 2013	Nielsen	49%	29%	12%	11%	43%	57%
9–11 Apr 2013	Galaxy	47%	33%	12%	8%	46%	54%
2 May 2013	ReachTEL	49.8%	31.3%	10.2%	8.8%	43%	57%
5–7 Apr 2013	Newspoll	48%	32%	11%	9%	45%	55%
4–7 Apr 2013	Morgan (multi)	46.5%	31%	10%	12.5%	44%	56%
4–7 Apr 2013	Essential	49%	32%	9%	9%	44%	56%
29 Mar–1 Apr 2013	Morgan (multi)	49%	30%	11%	10%	42.5%	57.5%
28 Mar–1 Apr 2013	Essential	49%	31%	11%	9%	44%	56%
22–24 Mar 2013	Newspoll	50%	30%	10%	10%	42%	58%
21–24 Mar 2013	Essential	47%	33%	11%	9%	46%	54%
22–23 Mar 2013	Galaxy	47%	32%	12%	9%	45%	55%
21–24 Mar 2013	Morgan (multi)	46.5%	30.5%	10.5%	12.5%	44%	56%
22–25 Mar 2013	AMR	49%	33%	9%	9%	44%	56%
14–17 Mar 2013	Essential	47%	35%	9%	8%	46%	54%
14–17 Mar 2013	Morgan (multi)	46%	33%	11%	10.5%	46%	54%
14–16 Mar 2013	Nielsen	47%	31%	10%	12%	44%	56%
7–10 Mar 2013	Essential	48%	34%	9%	9%	45%	55%
7–10 Mar 2013	Morgan (multi)	47%	31.5%	11%	10.5%	44.5%	55.5%
8–10 Mar 2013	Newspoll	44%	34%	11%	11%	48%	52%
5–7 Mar 2013	Galaxy	48%	32%	11%	9%	45%	55%
28 Feb–3 Mar 2013	Essential	49%	32%	10%	8%	44%	56%
28 Feb–3 Mar 2013	Morgan (multi)	45%	33%	10.5%	11.5%	46%	54%
21–24 Feb 2013	Essential	49%	32%	10%	8%	44%	56%
16–17/23–24 Feb 2013	Morgan (face)	44%	33.5%	10%	12.5%	46.5%	53.5%
22–24 Feb 2013	Newspoll	47%	31%	11%	11%	45%	55%
14–17 Feb 2013	Essential	47%	35%	10%	8%	46%	54%
14–16 Feb 2013	Nielsen	47%	30%	11%	12%	44%	56%
7–10 Feb 2013	Essential	48%	34%	9%	9%	45%	55%
9–10 Feb 2013	Morgan (face)	45%	33.5%	9%	12.5%	45.5%	54.5%
1–4 Feb 2013	Essential	48%	34%	10%	8%	46%	54%
2–3 Feb 2013	Morgan (face)	42.5%	38.5%	8.5%	10.5%	48.5%	51.5%
1–3 Feb 2013	Newspoll	48%	32%	9%	11%	44%	56%
1–3 Feb 2013	Galaxy	48%	35%	10%	7%	46%	54%
23–28 Jan 2013	Essential	48%	35%	10%	7%	46%	54%
19–20/26–27 Jan 2013	Morgan (face)	39%	36%	12%	13%	49.5%	50.5%
16–20 Jan 2013	Essential (Note: "Essential Report" (PDF). Essential Research. 21 January 2013.)	48%	36%	9%	8%	46%	54%
9–13 Jan 2013	Essential (Note: "Essential Report" (PDF). Essential Research. 14 January 2013.)	48%	36%	8%	8%	46%	54%
11–13 Jan 2013	Newspoll	44%	38%	9%	9%	49%	51%
5–6/12–13 Jan 2013	Morgan (face)	41.5%	36.5%	10.5%	11.5%	49%	51%
12–16 Dec 2012	Essential	48%	36%	8%	8%	45%	55%
8–9/15–16 Dec 2012	Morgan (face)	37.5%	40%	12%	10.5%	53.5%	46.5%
13–15 Dec 2012	Nielsen	43%	35%	10%	12%	48%	52%
5–9 Dec 2012	Essential	48%	36%	8%	8%	46%	54%
7–9 Dec 2012	Newspoll	46%	32%	11%	11%	46%	54%
28 Nov–2 Dec 2012	Essential	47%	37%	9%	7%	47%	53%
24–25 Nov/1–2 Dec 2012	Morgan (face)	40.5%	36%	10.5%	13%	49.5%	50.5%
29–30 Nov 2012	Galaxy	48%	34%	11%	7%	46%	54%
27–29 Nov 2012	Morgan (phone)	44.5%	36.5%	8.5%	10.5%	47.5%	52.5%
23–25 Nov 2012	Newspoll	43%	36%	11%	10%	49%	51%
21–25 Nov 2012	Essential	47%	36%	10%	8%	47%	53%
14–18 Nov 2012	Essential	46%	36%	10%	9%	47%	53%
10–11/17–18 Nov 2012	Morgan (face)	38.5%	36.5%	11.5%	13.5%	49%	51%
15–17 Nov 2012	Nielsen	45%	34%	12%	10%	47%	53%
9–11 Nov 2012	Newspoll	43%	36%	10%	11%	49%	51%
7–11 Nov 2012	Essential	45%	37%	9%	8%	48%	52%
2–6 Nov 2012	Essential	46%	37%	9%	8%	47%	53%
2–4 Nov 2012	Galaxy	47%	35%	11%	7%	47%	53%
27–28 Oct/3–4 Nov 2012	Morgan (face)	43%	35.5%	10%	11.5%	48%	52%
26–28 Oct 2012	Newspoll	41%	36%	10%	13%	50%	50%
25–28 Oct 2012	Essential	48%	36%	9%	7%	46%	54%
13–14/20–21 Oct 2012	Morgan (face)	38.5%	37.5%	12.5%	11.5%	42.5%	57.5%
17–21 Oct 2012	Essential (Note: "Essential Report" (PDF). Essential Research. 22 October 2012.)	47%	36%	9%	7%	47%	53%
18–20 Oct 2012	Nielsen	43%	34%	11%	12%	48%	52%
10–14 Oct 2012	Essential (Note: "Essential Report" (PDF). Essential Research. 14 October 2012.)	47%	36%	9%	8%	47%	53%
5–7 Oct 2012	Newspoll	45%	33%	10%	12%	46%	54%
3–7 Oct 2012	Essential	47%	37%	9%	7%	47%	53%
29–30 Sep/6–7 Oct 2012	Morgan (face)	43%	37%	10.5%	9.5%	49%	51%
26–30 Sep 2012	Essential	47%	36%	9%	7%	47%	53%
22–23 Sep 2012	Morgan (face)	41.5%	37.5%	10%	11%	50%	50%
19–23 Sep 2012	Essential	48%	35%	9%	9%	45%	55%
17–20 Sep 2012	Morgan (phone)	47%	39.5%	8%	5.5%	47.5%	52.5%
14–16 Sep 2012	Newspoll	41%	36%	12%	11%	50%	50%
12–16 Sep 2012	Essential	48%	34%	9%	9%	45%	55%
8–9/15–16 Sep 2012	Morgan (face)	40.5%	35%	12%	12.5%	49.5%	50.5%
13–15 Sep 2012	Nielsen	45%	34%	10%	11%	47%	53%
29 Aug–2 Sep 2012	Essential	48%	34%	9%	9%	45%	55%
31 Aug–2 Sep 2012	Newspoll	46%	33%	8%	13%	45%	55%
1–2 Sep 2012	Morgan (face)	41.5%	34.5%	11.5%	12.5%	48.5%	51.5%
22–26 Aug 2012	Essential	49%	32%	10%	9%	44%	56%
23–25 Aug 2012	Nielsen	45%	32%	11%	13%	46%	54%
15–19 Aug 2012	Essential	49%	32%	10%	9%	43%	57%
17–19 Aug 2012	Newspoll	45%	35%	11%	9%	47%	53%
11–12/18–19 Aug 2012	Morgan (face)	44%	34.5%	10%	11.5%	47%	53%
8–12 Aug 2012	Essential	49%	32%	10%	8%	44%	56%
3–5 Aug 2012	Newspoll	45%	33%	10%	12%	46%	54%
1–5 Aug 2012	Essential (Note: "Essential Report" (PDF). Essential Research. 7 August 2012.)	49%	33%	10%	8%	44%	56%
28–29 Jul/4–5 Aug 2012	Morgan (face)	43.5%	32%	11.5%	13%	46.5%	53.5%
25–29 Jul 2012	Essential	49%	33%	10%	8%	45%	55%
26–28 Jul 2012	Nielsen	47%	30%	12%	11%	44%	56%
20–22 Jul 2012	Newspoll	46%	28%	11%	15%	44%	56%
18–22 Jul 2012	Essential (Note: "Essential Report" (PDF). Essential Research. 23 July 2012.)	49%	33%	10%	9%	44%	56%
14–15/21–22 Jul 2012	Morgan (face)	43%	31.5%	12%	13.5%	46%	54%
11–15 Jul 2012	Essential	49%	31%	10%	9%	43%	57%
6–8 Jul 2012	Newspoll	48%	31%	11%	10%	44%	56%
4–8 Jul 2012	Essential	49%	31%	11%	9%	44%	56%
30 Jun–1/7–8 Jul 2012	Morgan (face)	43%	29.5%	14.5%	13%	46%	54%
27 Jun–1 Jul 2012	Essential	49%	32%	10%	9%	44%	56%
22–24 Jun 2012	Newspoll	46%	30%	12%	12%	45%	55%
20–24 Jun 2012	Essential	49%	33%	10%	8%	44%	56%
16–17/23–24 Jun 2012	Morgan (face)	43%	29.5%	14.5%	13%	46%	54%
13–17 Jun 2012	Essential	49%	33%	10%	8%	44%	56%
15–17 Jun 2012	Galaxy	49%	31%	12%	8%	44%	56%
6–11 Jun 2012	Essential	49%	32%	10%	9%	44%	56%
9–10 Jun 2012	Morgan (face)	42.5%	33%	12.5%	12%	48%	52%
7–10 Jun 2012	Newspoll	44%	31%	14%	11%	46%	54%
2–3 Jun 2012	Morgan (face)	45%	32.5%	10.5%	12%	44.5%	55.5%
31 May–2 Jun 2012	Nielsen	48%	26%	14%	12%	43%	57%
30 May–3 Jun 2012	Essential	50%	33%	10%	7%	44%	56%
26–27 May 2012	Morgan (face)	49%	27.5%	13%	10.5%	42%	58%
23–27 May 2012	Essential	50%	33%	10%	7%	43%	57%
25–27 May 2012	Newspoll	46%	32%	12%	10%	46%	54%
16–20 May 2012	Essential	49%	33%	10%	8%	44%	56%
19–20 May 2012	Morgan (face)	45.5%	32%	10.5%	12%	45%	55%
12–13 May 2012	Morgan (face)	46%	30.5%	12%	11.5%	44.5%	55.5%
11–13 May 2012	Newspoll	45%	30%	12%	13%	45%	55%
9–13 May 2012	Essential (Note: "Essential Report" (PDF). Essential Research. 14 May 2012.)	50%	30%	11%	9%	43%	57%
9–10 May 2012	Nielsen	49%	28%	12%	12%	42%	58%
9–10 May 2012	Morgan (phone)	50.5%	29%	10%	10.5%	42%	58%
5–6 May 2012	Morgan (face)	45.5%	29.5%	12%	13%	44.5%	55.5%
2–6 May 2012	Essential	50%	29%	11%	9%	42%	58%
27–29 Apr 2012	Newspoll	51%	27%	11%	11%	41%	59%
27–29 Apr 2012	Galaxy	49%	30%	13%	8%	44%	56%
25–29 Apr 2012	Essential	50%	31%	11%	9%	43%	57%
21–22 Apr 2012	Morgan (face)	47.5%	30%	12%	10.5%	44%	56%
18–22 Apr 2012	Essential	49%	31%	11%	9%	44%	56%
17–19 Apr 2012	Morgan (phone)	47.5%	30%	11.5%	11.5%	44%	56%
13–15 Apr 2012	Newspoll	48%	29%	12%	11%	44%	56%
11–15 Apr 2012	Essential	48%	31%	11%	9%	44%	56%
7–8/14–15 Apr 2012	Morgan (face)	46.5%	31%	12.5%	10%	45%	55%
4–9 Apr 2012	Essential	50%	31%	11%	9%	43%	57%
31 Mar–1 Apr 2012	Morgan (face)	45.5%	32%	13%	10.5%	46.5%	53.5%
28 Mar–1 Apr 2012	Essential	48%	33%	11%	8%	45%	55%
29–31 Mar 2012	Nielsen	47%	27%	13%	12%	43%	57%
21–25 Mar 2012	Essential	47%	34%	10%	9%	46%	54%
24–25 Mar 2012	Morgan (face)	45%	36.5%	12.5%	6%	48.5%	51.5%
23–25 Mar 2012	Newspoll	47%	28%	11%	14%	43%	57%
14–18 Mar 2012	Essential	48%	32%	11%	9%	46%	54%
10–11/17–18 Mar 2012	Morgan (face)	45.5%	37%	10.5%	7%	48%	52%
9–11 Mar 2012	Newspoll	43%	31%	12%	14%	47%	53%
7–11 Mar 2012	Essential	49%	31%	10%	9%	43%	57%
3–4 Mar 2012	Morgan (face)	43.5%	39%	10%	7.5%	50%	50%
29 Feb–4 Mar 2012	Essential	49%	32%	10%	9%	44%	56%
25–26 Feb 2012	Morgan (face)	42.5%	37.5%	11%	9%	50%	50%
23–26 Feb 2012	Newspoll	45%	35%	11%	9%	47%	53%
22–26 Feb 2012	Essential	49%	32%	11%	8%	44%	56%
23–24 Feb 2012	Galaxy	47%	34%	12%	7%	46%	54%
22–23 Feb 2012	Nielsen	44%	34%	12%	11%	47%	53%
15–19 Feb 2012	Essential	48%	33%	11%	9%	45%	55%
11–12/18–19 Feb 2012	Morgan (face)	41.5%	37%	14.5%	7%	51.5%	48.5%
10–12 Feb 2012	Newspoll	46%	32%	11%	11%	45%	55%
8–10 Feb 2012	Essential (Note: "Essential Report" (PDF). Essential Research. 13 February 2012.)	47%	34%	10%	9%	46%	54%
7–8 Feb 2012	Morgan (phone)	41.5%	37%	14.5%	7%	44.5%	55.5%
4–5 Feb 2012	Morgan (face)	45.5%	38.5%	9.5%	6.5%	48.5%	51.5%
1–5 Feb 2012	Essential (Note: "Essential Report" (PDF). Essential Research. 6 February 2012.)	47%	33%	11%	9%	46%	54%
2–4 Feb 2012	Nielsen	45%	33%	13%	9%	47%	53%
28–29 Jan 2012	Morgan (face)	41.5%	39.5%	9.5%	6.5%	51%	49%
27–29 Jan 2012	Newspoll	45%	30%	12%	13%	46%	54%
25–29 Jan 2012	Essential (Note: "Essential Report" (PDF). Essential Research. 30 January 2012.)	47%	34%	10%	8%	46%	54%
27–28 Jan 2012	Galaxy	48%	34%	12%	6%	46%	54%
18–22 Jan 2012	Essential	48%	35%	10%	7%	46%	54%
14–15/21–22 Jan 2012	Morgan (face)	42.5%	38.5%	12%	7%	51%	49%
17–18 Jan 2012	Morgan (phone)	46.5%	35.5%	9%	9%	46.5%	53.5%
11–15 Jan 2012	Essential	48%	35%	9%	8%	46%	54%
7–8 Jan 2012	Morgan (face)	45%	37%	10.5%	7.5%	48.5%	51.5%
14–18 Dec 2011	Essential	47%	35%	9%	8%	46%	54%
10–11/17–18 Dec 2011	Morgan (face)	43%	36.5%	13%	7.5%	50%	50%
7–11 Dec 2011	Essential (Note: "Essential Report" (PDF). Essential Research. 12 December 2011.)	48%	34%	10%	9%	45%	55%
8–10 Dec 2011	Nielsen	49%	29%	11%	11%	43%	57%
2–4 Dec 2011	Newspoll	44%	31%	13%	12%	46%	54%
30 Nov–4 Dec 2011	Essential (Note: "Essential Report" (PDF). Essential Research. 5 December 2011.)	47%	34%	10%	9%	46%	54%
26–27 Nov/3–4 Dec 2011	Morgan (face)	43%	36.5%	13%	7.5%	47%	53%
23–27 Nov 2011	Essential (Note: "Essential Report" (PDF). Essential Research. 28 November 2011.)	47%	34%	11%	8%	46%	54%
19–20 Nov 2011	Morgan (face)	45.5%	36.5%	12%	6%	48.5%	51.5%
18–20 Nov 2011	Newspoll	48%	30%	10%	12%	43%	57%
16–20 Nov 2011	Essential (Note: "Essential Report" (PDF). Essential Research. 21 November 2011.)	48%	34%	10%	7%	45%	55%
9–13 Nov 2011	Essential (Note: "Essential Report" (PDF). Essential Research. 14 November 2011.)	47%	35%	10%	8%	46%	54%
5–6/12–13 Nov 2011	Morgan (face)	47%	34.5%	11.5%	7%	46.5%	53.5%
10–12 Nov 2011	Nielsen	45%	30%	14%	12%	45%	55%
3–6 Nov 2011	Newspoll	44%	32%	12%	12%	47%	53%
2–6 Nov 2011	Essential (Note: "Essential Report" (PDF). Essential Research. 7 November 2011.)	46%	35%	9%	9%	46%	54%
2–3 Nov 2011	Morgan (phone)	45%	34%	12.5%	8.5%	47.5%	52.5%
26–30 Oct 2011	Essential (Note: "Essential Report" (PDF). Essential Research. 31 October 2011.)	47%	34%	10%	9%	45%	55%
29–30 Oct 2011	Morgan (face)	46.5%	34%	13.5%	6%	47%	53%
25–26 Oct 2011	Morgan (phone)	47%	31%	12.5%	9.6%	45%	55%
22–23 Oct 2011	Morgan (face)	49.5%	35%	10.5%	5%	45.5%	54.5%
21–23 Oct 2011	Newspoll	45%	29%	15%	11%	46%	54%
19–23 Oct 2011	Essential (Note: "Essential Report" (PDF). Essential Research. 24 October 2011.)	48%	32%	11%	8%	45%	55%
15–16 Oct 2011	Morgan (face)	44%	36.5%	10%	9.5%	48.5%	51.5%
14–16 Oct 2011	Galaxy	51%	29%	12%	8%	42%	58%
12–16 Oct 2011	Essential (Note: "Essential Report" (PDF). Essential Research. 17 October 2011.)	48%	33%	11%	8%	45%	55%
13–15 Oct 2011	Nielsen	48%	30%	12%	10%	43%	57%
8–9 Oct 2011	Morgan (face)	43.5%	38.5%	11%	7%	50%	50%
7–9 Oct 2011	Newspoll	49%	29%	12%	10%	43%	57%
4–9 Oct 2011	Essential	48%	33%	10%	9%	45%	55%
27 Sep–2 Oct 2011	Essential (Note: "Essential Report" (PDF). Essential Research. 3 October 2011.)	48%	33%	11%	9%	45%	55%
24–25 Sep/1–2 Oct 2011	Morgan (face)	46.5%	35.5%	10%	8%	46.5%	53.5%
20–25 Sep 2011	Essential (Note: "Essential Report" (PDF). Essential Research. 26 September 2011.)	49%	32%	12%	8%	44%	56%
16–18 Sep 2011	Newspoll	48%	26%	13%	13%	42%	58%
13–18 Sep 2011	Essential (Note: "Essential Report" (PDF). Essential Research. 19 September 2011.)	49%	32%	10%	9%	44%	56%
10–11/17–18 Sep 2011	Morgan (face)	46.5%	35.5%	10%	8%	44.5%	55.5%
7–11 Sep 2011	Essential	49%	32%	10%	10%	44%	56%
8–10 Sep 2011	Nielsen	48%	27%	13%	12%	42%	58%
2–4 Sep 2011	Newspoll	50%	27%	12%	11%	41%	59%
31 Aug–4 Sep 2011	Essential (Note: "Essential Report" (PDF). Essential Research. 5 September 2011.)	49%	30%	11%	10%	43%	57%
27–28 Aug/3–4 Sep 2011	Morgan (face)	46.5%	32.5%	12.5%	8.5%	45.5%	54.5%
24–28 Aug 2011	Essential	49%	32%	10%	8%	44%	56%
19–21 Aug 2011	Newspoll	47%	27%	14%	12%	43%	57%
17–21 Aug 2011	Essential (Note: "Essential Report" (PDF). Essential Research. 22 August 2011.)	50%	32%	10%	8%	44%	56%
13–14/20–21 Aug 2011	Morgan (face)	49.5%	32.5%	11%	7%	44.5%	55.5%
10–14 Aug 2011	Essential (Note: "Essential Report" (PDF). Essential Research. 15 August 2011.)	50%	31%	10%	9%	43%	57%
11–13 Aug 2011	Nielsen	48%	28%	12%	11%	42%	58%
9–10 Aug 2011	Morgan (phone)	49%	29.5%	12%	9.5%	45.5%	54.5%
5–7 Aug 2011	Newspoll	50%	30%	10%	10%	43%	57%
3–7 Aug 2011	Essential (Note: "Essential Report" (PDF). Essential Research. 8 August 2011.)	50%	31%	10%	9%	43%	57%
30–31 Jul/6–7 Aug 2011	Morgan (face)	47.5%	34.5%	12%	6%	46.5%	53.5%
c. 3 Aug 2011	Galaxy	48%	31%	13%	8%	44%	56%
27–31 Jul 2011	Essential (Note: "Essential Report" (PDF). Essential Research. 1 August 2011.)	49%	31%	11%	9%	44%	56%
22–24 Jul 2011	Newspoll	47%	29%	13%	11%	44%	56%
20–24 Jul 2011	Essential (Note: "Essential Report" (PDF). Essential Research. 25 July 2011.)	48%	32%	11%	9%	45%	55%
16–17/23–24 Jul 2011	Morgan (face)	47%	34.5%	12%	6.5%	47%	53%
13–17 Jul 2011	Essential (Note: "Essential Report" (PDF). Essential Research. 18 July 2011.)	49%	31%	11%	9%	44%	56%
14–16 Jul 2011	Nielsen	51%	26%	11%	15%	39%	61%
13–14 Jul 2011	Morgan (phone)	52.5%	27.5%	10.5%	9.5%	40%	60%
9–10 Jul 2011	Morgan (face)	48%	33.5%	11.5%	7%	45.5%	54.5%
8–10 Jul 2011	Newspoll	49%	27%	12%	12%	42%	58%
6–10 Jul 2011	Essential (Note: "Essential Report" (PDF). Essential Research. 11 July 2011.)	50%	30%	11%	9%	43%	57%
29 Jun–3 Jul 2011	Essential (Note: "Essential Report" (PDF). Essential Research. 4 July 2011.)	49%	32%	11%	9%	44%	56%
25–26 Jun/1–2 Jul 2011	Morgan (face)	49%	31.5%	11.5%	8%	43.5%	56.5%
24–26 Jun 2011	Newspoll	46%	30%	11%	13%	45%	55%
22–26 Jun 2011	Essential (Note: "Essential Report" (PDF). Essential Research. 27 June 2011.)	48%	32%	11%	9%	45%	55%
11–12/18–19 Jun 2011	Morgan (face)	46.5%	35%	11.5%	7%	46.5%	53.5%
15–19 Jun 2011	Essential (Note: "Essential Report" (PDF). Essential Research. 20 June 2011.)	47%	32%	12%	9%	45%	55%
14–16 Jun 2011	Nielsen	49%	27%	12%	12%	41%	59%
8–13 Jun 2011	Essential (Note: "Essential Report" (PDF). Essential Research. 14 June 2011.)	46%	34%	12%	8%	46%	54%
10–12 Jun 2011	Newspoll	46%	31%	11%	12%	45%	55%
4–5 Jun 2011	Morgan (face)	46.5%	33.5%	12%	8%	46%	54%
1–5 Jun 2011	Essential (Note: "Essential Report" (PDF). Essential Research. 14 June 2011.)	46%	34%	12%	8%	47%	53%
31 May–2 Jun 2011	Morgan (phone)	50%	30%	9.5%	10.5%	42%	58%
25–29 May 2011	Essential (Note: "Essential Report" (PDF). Essential Research. 30 May 2011.)	47%	34%	12%	8%	46%	54%
27–29 May 2011	Newspoll	44%	34%	14%	8%	48%	52%
21–22/28–29 May 2011	Morgan (face)	45.5%	36%	12%	6.5%	48.5%	51.5%
18–22 May 2011	Essential (Note: "Essential Report" (PDF). Essential Research. 23 May 2011.)	46%	34%	12%	8%	47%	53%
14–15 May 2011	Morgan (face)	44.5%	36%	13%	6.5%	48.5%	51.5%
13–15 May 2011	Newspoll	46%	33%	10%	11%	46%	54%
11–15 May 2011	Essential (Note: "Essential Report" (PDF). Essential Research. 16 May 2011.)	46%	36%	11%	7%	48%	52%
12–14 May 2011	Nielsen	47%	31%	10%	13%	44%	56%
7–8 May 2011	Morgan (face)	48%	34%	11%	7%	45.5%	54.5%
4–8 May 2011	Essential (Note: "Essential Report" (PDF). Essential Research. 9 May 2011.)	47%	35%	10%	8%	46%	54%
3–4 May 2011	Morgan (phone)	46%	34%	11%	9%	46.5%	53.5%
29 Apr–1 May 2011	Newspoll	44%	33%	12%	11%	47%	53%
28 Apr–1 May 2011	Essential (Note: "Essential Report" (PDF). Essential Research. 2 May 2011.)	47%	35%	9%	9%	46%	54%
23–24/30 Apr–1 May 2011	Morgan (face)	46%	37%	10.5%	6.5%	48%	52%
20–26 Apr 2011	Essential (Note: "Essential Report" (PDF). Essential Research. 27 April 2011.)	47%	35%	10%	8%	46%	54%
13–17 Apr 2011	Essential (Note: "Essential Report" (PDF). Essential Research. 18 April 2011.)	47%	35%	11%	8%	46%	54%
9–10/16–17 Apr 2011	Morgan (face)	46%	35%	11.5%	7.5%	47%	53%
14–16 Apr 2011	Nielsen	47%	31%	12%	11%	44%	56%
6–10 Apr 2011	Essential (Note: "Essential Report" (PDF). Essential Research. 11 April 2011.)	46%	35%	11%	8%	47%	53%
2–3 Apr 2011	Morgan (face)	48%	36.5%	9.5%	6%	46.5%	53.5%
1–3 Apr 2011	Newspoll	45%	32%	12%	12%	45%	55%
30 Mar–3 Apr 2011	Essential	46%	36%	10%	8%	47%	53%
26–27 Mar 2011	Morgan (face)	47%	35.5%	11.5%	6%	47%	53%
23–27 Mar 2011	Essential (Note: "Essential Report" (PDF). Essential Research. 28 March 2011.)	46%	37%	10%	7%	48%	52%
22–24 Mar 2011	Morgan (phone)	47%	34.5%	10%	8.5%	46%	54%
19–20 Mar 2011	Morgan (face)	40%	39.5%	12.5%	8%	52.5%	47.5%
18–20 Mar 2011	Newspoll	40%	36%	12%	12%	51%	49%
16–20 Mar 2011	Essential (Note: "Essential Report" (PDF). Essential Research. 21 March 2011.)	46%	36%	10%	8%	47%	53%
16–17 Mar 2011	Morgan (phone)	42.5%	35.5%	12%	10%	49%	51%
12–13 Mar 2011	Morgan (face)	44.5%	38%	11.5%	6%	49.5%	50.5%
9–13 Mar 2011	Essential (Note: "Essential Report" (PDF). Essential Research. 14 March 2011.)	47%	35%	10%	8%	46%	54%
10–12 Mar 2011	Nielsen	45%	33%	12%	10%	46%	54%
8–10 Mar 2011	Morgan (phone)	47.5%	31.5%	10%	11%	44%	56%
5–6 Mar 2011	Morgan (face)	46.5%	37%	9.5%	7%	48%	52%
4–6 Mar 2011	Newspoll	45%	30%	15%	10%	46%	54%
2–6 Mar 2011	Essential	47%	36%	10%	7%	47%	53%
26–27 Feb 2011	Morgan (face)	41%	41%	11.5%	6.5%	53.5%	46.5%
22–27 Feb 2011	Essential (Note: "Essential Report" (PDF). Essential Research. 28 February 2011.)	45%	37%	10%	7%	48%	52%
21–23 Feb 2011	Morgan (phone)	45.5%	36%	9.5%	9%	47%	53%
18–20 Feb 2011	Newspoll	41%	36%	13%	10%	50%	50%
15–20 Feb 2011	Essential (Note: "Essential Report" (PDF). Essential Research. 21 February 2011.)	43%	39%	11%	7%	49%	51%
12–13/19–20 Feb 2011	Morgan (face)	43%	39.5%	11.5%	6%	51%	49%
8–13 Feb 2011	Essential (Note: "Essential Report" (PDF). Essential Research. 14 February 2011.)	44%	40%	10%	6%	50%	50%
10–12 Feb 2011	Nielsen	46%	32%	12%	9%	46%	54%
4–6 Feb 2011	Newspoll	44%	32%	14%	10%	48%	52%
1–6 Feb 2011	Essential (Note: "Essential Report" (PDF). Essential Research. 7 February 2011.)	46%	38%	10%	7%	49%	51%
29–30 Jan/5–6 Feb 2011	Morgan (face)	43%	39%	12.5%	5.5%	51.5%	48.5%
1–3 Feb 2011	Morgan (phone)	42.5%	35%	12%	10.5%	49%	51%
25–30 Jan 2011	Essential	45%	37%	11%	7%	49%	51%
18–23 Jan 2011	Essential (Note: "Essential Report" (PDF). Essential Research. 24 January 2011.)	45%	37%	11%	7%	49%	51%
15–16/22–23 Jan 2011	Morgan (face)	41.5%	40.5%	11.5%	6.5%	52.5%	47.5%
11–16 Jan 2011	Essential (Note: "Essential Report" (PDF). Essential Research. 17 January 2011.)	46%	38%	10%	6%	48%	52%
8–9 Jan 2011	Morgan (face)	44%	38.5%	13%	4.5%	50.5%	49.5%
14–19 Dec 2010	Essential (Note: "Essential Report" (PDF). Essential Research. 20 December 2010.)	46%	38%	10%	7%	48%	52%
11–12 Dec 2010	Morgan (face)	43%	38%	13.5%	5.5%	50%	50%
8–12 Dec 2010	Morgan (phone)	46%	31%	13.5%	9.5%	45.5%	54.5%
7–12 Dec 2010	Essential (Note: "Essential Report" (PDF). Essential Research. 13 December 2010.)	46%	38%	10%	7%	48%	52%
4–5 Dec 2010	Morgan (face)	40.5%	40.5%	13.5%	5.5%	53%	47%
3–5 Dec 2010	Newspoll	41%	34%	14%	11%	50%	50%
30 Nov–5 Dec 2010	Essential (Note: "Essential Report" (PDF). Essential Research. 6 December 2010.)	45%	38%	11%	6%	49%	51%
23–28 Nov 2010	Essential	44%	38%	11%	7%	49%	51%
20–21/27–28 Nov 2010	Morgan (face)	42%	40.5%	12%	5.5%	52.5%	47.5%
19–21 Nov 2010	Newspoll	39%	36%	14%	11%	52%	48%
16–21 Nov 2010	Essential (Note: "Essential Report" (PDF). Essential Research. 22 November 2010.)	45%	38%	10%	8%	49%	51%
18–20 Nov 2010	Nielsen	43%	35%	13%	8%	49%	51%
9–14 Nov 2010	Essential	45%	39%	10%	7%	49%	51%
6–7/13–14 Nov 2010	Morgan (face)	40%	41%	12%	7%	54%	46%
5–7 Nov 2010	Newspoll	43%	34%	13%	10%	48%	52%
2–7 Nov 2010	Essential	46%	39%	8%	7%	49%	51%
26–31 Oct 2010	Essential	44%	41%	8%	7%	50%	50%
23–24/30–31 Oct 2010	Morgan (face)	40.5%	43%	10.5%	6%	54%	46%
22–24 Oct 2010	Newspoll	43%	33%	14%	10%	48%	52%
19–24 Oct 2010	Essential	44%	41%	8%	7%	50%	50%
21–23 Oct 2010	Nielsen	43%	34%	14%	8%	49%	51%
12–17 Oct 2010	Essential	44%	40%	9%	7%	50%	50%
9–10/16–17 Oct 2010	Morgan (face)	40.5%	43%	10.5%	6%	54%	46%
8–10 Oct 2010	Newspoll	42%	35%	14%	9%	50%	50%
5–10 Oct 2010	Essential (Note: "Essential Report" (PDF). Essential Research. 11 October 2010.)	44%	41%	8%	7%	50%	50%
2–3 Oct 2010	Morgan (face)	38.5%	44%	12%	5.5%	55.5%	44.5%
30 Sep–1 Oct 2010	Essential	44%	42%	8%	8%	51%	49%
21–26 Sep 2010	Essential	43%	42%	9%	6%	51%	49%
18–19 Sep 2010	Morgan (face)	41%	40.5%	13%	5.5%	53.5%	46.5%
14–19 Sep 2010	Essential	45%	40%	9%	6%	50%	50%
15–16 Sep 2010	Morgan (phone)	42.5%	35.5%	15%	7%	50.5%	49.5%
10–12 Sep 2010	Newspoll	41%	34%	14%	11%	50%	50%
7–12 Sep 2010	Essential	44%	39%	10%	6%	50%	50%
31 Aug–5 Sep 2010	Essential (Note: "Essential Report" (PDF). Essential Research. 6 September 2010.)	43%	39%	11%	8%	51%	49%
28–29 Aug/4–5 Sep 2010	Morgan (face)	39.5%	40.5%	15%	5%	54.5%	45.5%
24–29 Aug 2010	Essential	44%	38%	11%	7%	50%	50%
25–26 Aug 2010	Morgan (phone)	40%	36%	13%	11%	51%	49%
2010 election		43.3%	38.0%	11.8%	7.0%	50.1%	49.9%
c. 21 Aug 2010	Nielsen	41.5%	39%	12%	7.5%	52%	48%
17–19 Aug 2010	Newspoll	43.4%	36.2%	13.9%	6.5%	50.2%	49.8%
13–19 Aug 2010	Essential	43%	38%	12%	7%	51%	49%
*Liberal–National Coalition

== Better Prime Minister and approval ==
Since the 2010 election, Newspoll and Nielsen have regularly polled voters as to whom they believe would be the best prime minister and on their satisfaction with the performance of the prime minister, Kevin Rudd (and previously Julia Gillard), and of the leader of the opposition, Tony Abbott.

Sources for Nielsen are provided for each poll; Newspoll maintains a database of its polling.

Better Prime Minister and satisfaction polling^
Date	Firm	Better PM		Rudd		Abbott
		Rudd	Abbott	Satisfied	Dissatisfied	Satisfied	Dissatisfied
4–5 Sep 2013	Newspoll	43%	45%	33%	58%	44%	50%
4–5 Aug 2013	Nielsen	47%	46%	43%	52%	46%	51%
5 Sep 2013	ReachTEL	47.1%	52.9%	not asked
4 Sep 2013	ReachTEL	45.9%	54.1%	not asked
3 Sep 2013	ReachTEL	47.1%	52.9%	not asked
30 Aug–1 Sep 2013	Newspoll	41%	43%	32%	58%	41%	51%
26 Aug 2013	ReachTEL	46.4%	53.6%	not asked
23–25 Aug 2013	Newspoll	44%	40%	36%	52%	42%	49%
18–22 Aug 2013	Nielsen	48%	45%	43%	51%	44%	52%
16–18 Aug 2013	Newspoll	43%	41%	35%	54%	41%	51%
9–11 Aug 2013	Newspoll	46%	37%	39%	48%	38%	52%
10 Aug 2013	ReachTEL	46.8%	53.2%	not asked
6–8 Aug 2013	Nielsen	50%	42%	48%	47%	45%	52%
2–4 Aug 2013	Newspoll	47%	33%	38%	47%	34%	56%
4 Aug 2013	ReachTEL	49.1%	50.9%	not asked
19–21 Jul 2013	Newspoll	50%	34%	42%	41%	35%	56%
18 Jul 2013	ReachTEL	52.4%	47.6%	not asked
11–13 Jul 2013	Nielsen	55%	41%	51%	43%	35%	56%
5–7 Jul 2013	Newspoll	53%	31%	43%	36%	41%	56%
28–30 Jun 2013	Newspoll	49%	35%	36%	36%	35%	56%
27 Jun 2013	ReachTEL	51.6%	48.4%	not asked
		Gillard	Abbott	Gillard		Abbott
21–23 Jun 2013	Newspoll	33%	45%	28%	62%	36%	53%
13–15 Jun 2013	Nielsen	41%	50%	36%	61%	44%	53%
31 May–2 Jun 2013	Newspoll	35%	43%	28%	62%	37%	53%
17–19 May 2013	Newspoll	39%	40%	31%	59%	37%	54%
16–18 May 2013	Nielsen	46%	46%	40%	56%	42%	54%
3–5 May 2013	Newspoll	37%	42%	29%	61%	36%	51%
3 May 2013	ReachTEL	40.6%	59.4%	not asked
19–21 Apr 2013	Newspoll	35%	40%	30%	60%	36%	53%
11–14 Apr 2013	Nielsen	42%	50%	37%	59%	43%	53%
4 Aug 2013	ReachTEL	43.6%	56.5%	not asked
4–7 Apr 2013	Newspoll	37%	40%	28%	62%	35%	54%
22–24 Mar 2013	Newspoll	35%	43%	26%	65%	39%	50%
14–16 Mar 2013	Nielsen	43%	49%	38%	58%	43%	53%
8–10 Mar 2013	Newspoll	42%	38%	32%	57%	36%	55%
22–24 Feb 2013	Newspoll	36%	40%	30%	58%	33%	55%
14–16 Feb 2013	Nielsen	45%	49%	40%	56%	42%	55%
1–3 Feb 2013	Newspoll	41%	39%	36%	52%	33%	56%
11–13 Jan 2013	Newspoll	45%	33%	38%	49%	29%	58%
13–15 Dec 2012	Nielsen	50%	40%	46%	50%	34%	63%
7–9 Dec 2012	Newspoll	43%	34%	36%	52%	28%	59%
23–25 Nov 2012	Newspoll	46%	33%	37%	52%	30%	61%
15–17 Nov 2012	Nielsen	51%	42%	47%	48%	36%	60%
9–11 Nov 2012	Newspoll	46%	32%	37%	52%	27%	63%
26–28 Oct 2012	Newspoll	45%	34%	35%	51%	30%	58%
18–20 Oct 2012	Nielsen	50%	40%	47%	48%	37%	60%
5–7 Oct 2012	Newspoll	43%	33%	36%	50%	33%	55%
14–16 Sep 2012	Newspoll	46%	32%	36%	52%	30%	60%
13–15 Sep 2012	Nielsen	47%	44%	42%	53%	36%	59%
2–4 Sep 2012	Newspoll	39%	38%	31%	57%	31%	59%
23–25 Aug 2012	Nielsen	46%	45%	39%	57%	39%	57%
17–19 Aug 2012	Newspoll	38%	38%	27%	60%	34%	54%
3–5 Aug 2012	Newspoll	36%	38%	29%	59%	32%	56%
26–28 Jul 2012	Nielsen	43%	48%	37%	58%	39%	56%
20–22 Jul 2012	Newspoll	36%	40%	29%	62%	30%	61%
6–8 Jul 2012	Newspoll	36%	39%	27%	61%	32%	57%
22–24 Jun 2012	Newspoll	39%	38%	30%	59%	31%	58%
7–10 Jun 2012	Newspoll	42%	38%	32%	58%	32%	59%
31 May–2 Jun 2012	Nielsen	44%	46%	36%	60%	39%	57%
25–27 May 2012	Newspoll	40%	37%	30%	60%	31%	60%
11–13 May 2012	Newspoll	36%	40%	27%	63%	34%	56%
9–10 May 2012	Nielsen	42%	50%	35%	60%	44%	52%
27–29 Apr 2012	Newspoll	36%	41%	28%	63%	33%	55%
13–15 Apr 2012	Newspoll	39%	41%	28%	62%	35%	54%
29–31 Mar 2012	Nielsen	45%	48%	36%	59%	39%	56%
23–25 Mar 2012	Newspoll	40%	37%	31%	58%	32%	58%
9–11 Mar 2012	Newspoll	39%	37%	28%	62%	32%	58%
24–26 Feb 2012	Newspoll	36%	38%	26%	64%	31%	57%
22–23 Feb 2012	Nielsen	46%	47%	36%	60%	41%	56%
10–12 Feb 2012	Newspoll	37%	40%	32%	57%	36%	52%
2–4 Feb 2012	Nielsen	48%	46%	40%	55%	41%	54%
27–29 Jan 2012	Newspoll	40%	37%	33%	55%	32%	55%
8–10 Dec 2011	Nielsen	42%	46%	35%	58%	41%	53%
2–4 Dec 2011	Newspoll	43%	36%	36%	56%	33%	57%
18–20 Nov 2011	Newspoll	40%	35%	34%	55%	34%	55%
10–12 Nov 2011	Nielsen	45%	45%	39%	57%	41%	54%
4–6 Nov 2011	Newspoll	39%	40%	30%	60%	34%	57%
21–23 Oct 2011	Newspoll	36%	39%	31%	61%	34%	55%
13–15 Oct 2011	Nielsen	44%	48%	33%	62%	41%	54%
7–9 Oct 2011	Newspoll	35%	40%	28%	60%	36%	53%
16–18 Sep 2011	Newspoll	35%	40%	27%	61%	34%	54%
8–10 Sep 2011	Nielsen	40%	48%	32%	62%	43%	52%
2–4 Sep 2011	Newspoll	34%	43%	23%	68%	39%	52%
19–21 Aug 2011	Newspoll	38%	39%	29%	61%	36%	55%
11–13 Aug 2011	Nielsen	44%	47%	38%	57%	43%	52%
5–7 Aug 2011	Newspoll	39%	40%	33%	58%	39%	52%
22–24 Jul 2011	Newspoll	40%	41%	32%	59%	39%	52%
14–16 Jul 2011	Nielsen	40%	51%	34%	62%	47%	48%
8–10 Jul 2011	Newspoll	38%	43%	30%	59%	42%	49%
24–26 Jun 2011	Newspoll	39%	40%	28%	62%	39%	52%
14–16 Jun 2011	Nielsen	46%	46%	37%	59%	46%	50%
10–12 Jun 2011	Newspoll	41%	38%	30%	55%	35%	52%
27–29 May 2011	Newspoll	44%	37%	35%	54%	37%	53%
13–15 May 2011	Newspoll	42%	38%	34%	55%	38%	51%
12–14 May 2011	Nielsen	47%	44%	43%	52%	45%	50%
29 Apr–1 May 2011	Newspoll	45%	36%	38%	49%	42%	48%
14–16 Apr 2011	Nielsen	50%	42%	45%	50%	42%	51%
1–3 Apr 2011	Newspoll	46%	37%	39%	49%	36%	53%
18–20 Mar 2011	Newspoll	50%	31%	40%	47%	33%	54%
10–12 Mar 2011	Nielsen	51%	42%	47%	47%	43%	52%
4–6 Mar 2011	Newspoll	45%	36%	39%	51%	39%	51%
18–20 Feb 2011	Newspoll	53%	31%	50%	39%	38%	49%
10–12 Feb 2011	Nielsen	51%	41%	52%	43%	46%	49%
4–6 Feb 2011	Newspoll	48%	35%	45%	42%	42%	44%
3–5 Dec 2010	Newspoll	52%	32%	45%	38%	42%	43%
19–21 Nov 2010	Newspoll	54%	31%	46%	37%	42%	45%
18–20 Nov 2010	Nielsen	53%	40%	54%	39%	47%	48%
5–7 Nov 2010	Newspoll	49%	34%	41%	41%	44%	42%
22–24 Oct 2010	Newspoll	53%	32%	44%	37%	41%	46%
21–23 Oct 2010	Nielsen	53%	39%	54%	39%	45%	50%
8–10 Oct 2010	Newspoll	52%	31%	48%	33%	39%	47%
10–12 Sep 2010	Newspoll	50%	34%	44%	36%	48%	38%
2010 election	–	–	–	–	–	–	–
17–19 Aug 2010	Newspoll	50%	37%	44%	43%	42%	50%
^ Remainder were uncommitted.
