= Fiji Sun =

Daily newspaper in Fiji

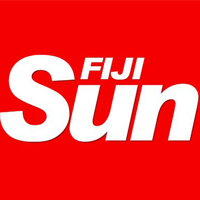
- Type: Daily newspaper
- Format: Tabloid
- Owner: Sun (Fiji) News Pte Limited
- Publisher: Rosi Doviverata
- Editor-in-chief: Rosi Doviverata
- News editor: Rosi Doviverata
- Founded: September 1999
- Political alignment: Centre; Bainimarama era: Pro-Bainimarama
- Language: English (primary), Fijian
- Headquarters: 20 Gorrie Street, Suva, Fiji
- Circulation: 25,000 (as of 2011)
- Website: www.fijisun.com.fj

The Fiji Sun is a predominantly English-language centrist daily newspaper published in Fiji since September 1999 and owned by Sun News Limited. Fiji Sun was founded by and is part of CJ Patel Group.

The Fiji Sun has its main newsroom in Suva, Fiji. Its print center remains in suburban Walu Bay, from where the paper was founded in September 1999.

The Fiji Sun also has an online edition which is updated daily. An e-paper edition is also published.

== Politics ==
=== Fijian politics ===
The Fiji Sun tends to be supportive of Frank Bainimarama's FijiFirst party, which has been confirmed by a journalist for the Fiji Sun in 2014. This has led to many accusations of media bias.

During the lead-ups to the 2014 and 2018 general elections, the Fiji Sun was the main provider of opinion polls for these elections, which were conducted for the newspaper by Razor Research in 2014 and Western Force Research in 2018. In the lead-up to the 2022 election, the Fiji Sun released very few opinion polls compared to in 2014 and 2018 due to restrictions adopted by the government. In 2022, one poll conducted for the Fiji Sun by Western Force Research (which showed that FijiFirst would lose the election) was found to have breached the set guidelines.

=== Foreign politics ===
Due to Australia's sanctions against Fiji enforced by the Labor governments of Kevin Rudd and Julia Gillard following the 2006 coup d'état, the Fiji Sun was critical of the federal Labor government and was somewhat supportive of Tony Abbott and the Liberal-National Coalition opposition. The Fiji Sun endorsed Abbott at the 2010 and 2013 federal elections. This was primarily due to Abbott's commitment to normalising relations between the two countries, which prompted Prime Minister Frank Bainimarama to personally endorse Abbott on both occasions. After Abbott's landslide victory in 2013 and the return of democratic elections in Fiji in 2014, relations were normalised.

For a similar reason to the Australia, the Fiji Sun was also critical of the New Zealand National Party government, led by John Key, though it also did not support the Labour opposition. However, the Fiji Sun's position changed to be more positive when Key's government normalised relations between the two countries in 2014.

During the lead-up to the 2016 United States presidential election, the Fiji Sun was somewhat supportive of incumbent Democratic President Barack Obama and Democratic nominee Hillary Clinton and somewhat critical of Republican nominee (and the election's eventual winner) Donald Trump. The Fiji Sun endorsed Clinton for the election.

== See also ==
- Culture of Fiji
- List of newspapers in Fiji
