= Sanctions against Fiji =

Economic sanctions, 2006–2014

A series of economic sanctions against Fiji were made in response to the 2006 Fijian coup d'état of December 2006. The sanctions began in 2006 and ended after elections were held in 2014. (Note: New Zealand lifted some sanctions in 2013.) On 31 October 2014, Australia lifted all remaining sanctions, including on weapons sales. Both countries restored their high commissioners.

Fiji was suspended from the Commonwealth of Nations. On 2 May 2009, the 16 member Pacific Islands Forum anonymously voted to suspend Fiji’s participation in the Forum, saying there was no place for a regime which displays "such a total disregard for basic human rights" and after Commodore Frank Bainimarama failed to set a date for an election by the deadline of 1 May and saying it will be at least 5 years to an election. Fiji was readmitted to the Forum on 27 October 2014, after the election, which was held in September 2014.

== Countries that sanctioned Fiji ==
Country	Reference(s)
Australia	
France	
New Zealand	
Samoa	
United States	

== Opposition to sanctions ==
The Government of Fiji actively opposed sanctions, as did several other countries, including China, India and Russia. These countries expanded their ties with Fiji after the coup.

== Public opinion ==
=== Australia ===
A 2010 Lowy Institute poll showed that 56% of Australians supported retaining the limited travel restrictions against Fiji, 24% opposed all sanctions and wanted normalisation, 16% supported more sanctions and 4% were unsure. In 2012, another Lowy Institute poll showed that 79% of Australians supported restarting dialogue with Fiji (28% "strongly in favour" and 51% were "somewhat in favour"), 17% opposed restarting dialogue (11% "somewhat against" and 6% "strongly against") and 4% were unsure.

=== Fiji ===
A Lowy Institute poll conducted in Fiji under the direction of Jenny Hayward-Jones showed that 66% of people in Fiji approved of Prime Minister Commodore Frank Bainimarama. Per ethnic group, he was approved of by 75% of Indo-Fijians and 60% of iTaukei (Indigenous Fijians). This meant that Bainimarama was three times more popular among Fijians than Julia Gillard was among Australians. 79% of Fijians also disapproved of the suspension of Fiji from the Pacific Islands Forum and the Commonwealth of Nations. The survey was disputed by some, however, including national secretary of the Fiji Trade Union Congress, Felix Anthony.
