= List of Indigenous Australian politicians =

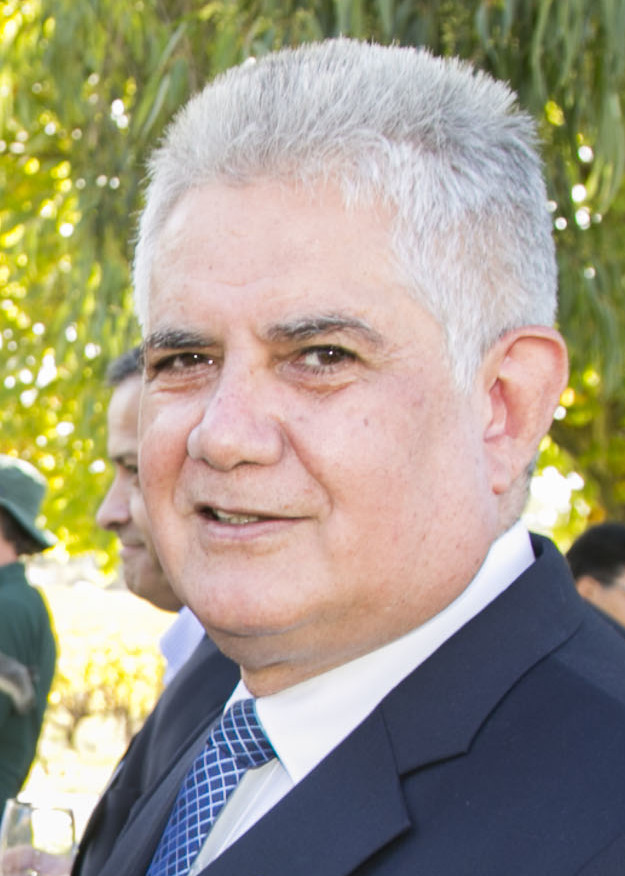
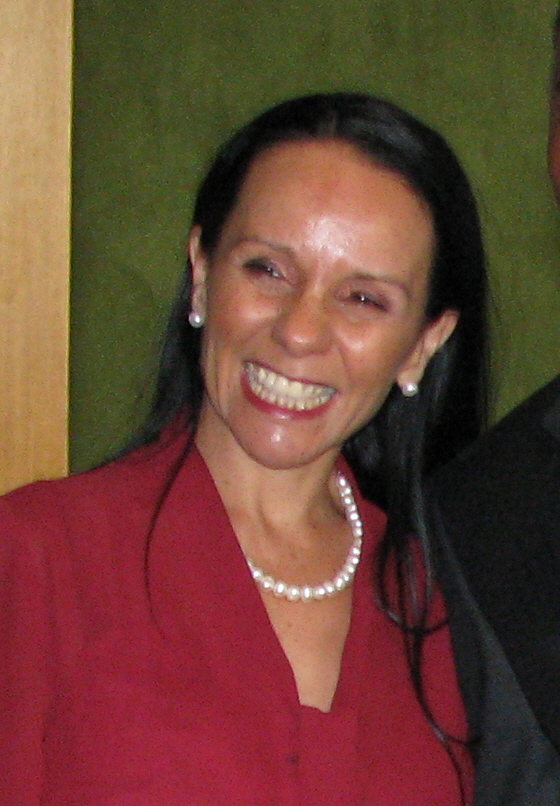
Ken Wyatt (left) was the Coalition's first and only Indigenous Australian member of the Australian House of Representatives. Linda Burney (right) is the ALP's first Indigenous Australian MP; later joined by Gordon Reid and Marion Scrymgour.

This list of Indigenous Australian politicians includes Indigenous Australians who have been members of Australian legislatures—federal, state or territory. It does not include those elected to local councils (including mayors), Governors/Governors-General, leaders of political parties (outside of parliament), Indigenous Australians actively involved in political institutions and those who have run unsuccessfully for office.

There have been 53 Indigenous members of the ten Australian legislatures, beginning when Neville Bonner entered the Australian Senate on 15 August 1971. Of these, 23 have been elected to the Northern Territory assembly, eleven to the Australian Federal Parliament, six to the parliament of Western Australia, five to the parliament of Queensland, two each to the parliaments of Tasmania, Victoria and New South Wales, and one each to the parliament of South Australia and the Australian Capital Territory assembly. Three have served in multiple parliaments.

As of 2023, Indigenous Australians make up 10.5% of the Senate and 1.9% of the House of Representatives. The total representation is at 4.8%, which is above their representation in the total population (3.3%).

Out of the 53 Indigenous Australians elected or appointed to any Australian parliament, 24 have been women.

Nobody of acknowledged Aboriginal or Torres Strait Islander ancestry has yet been a member of the Norfolk Island assembly.

Note: There is considerable debate surrounding the complexity of Indigenous identity. Therefore, this list only includes those who identify themselves as Indigenous Australian. Also note that "origin" or "ancestry" refers to the Indigenous groups, communities, countries, place names or languages which that person identifies with. Some individuals do not have any specific Indigenous group identity and some have multiple identities.

== Federal Parliament ==
Sixteen Indigenous Australian people have been members of the Parliament of Australia (the Federal Parliament), eleven in the Senate and five in the House of Representatives. Nine of them are in it today.

No.	Name	Party	Chamber	Constituency	Origin	Term start	Term end	Term length	Ref
1	Neville Bonner	Liberal	Senate	Queensland	Jagera	11 June 1971	11 February 1983	11 years, 267 days	
1	Neville Bonner	Independent	Senate	Queensland	Jagera	11 February 1983	5 March 1983	11 years, 267 days	
2	Aden Ridgeway	Democrats	Senate	New South Wales	Gumbaynggirr	1 July 1999	30 June 2005	5 years, 364 days	
3	Ken Wyatt	Liberal	House	Hasluck (WA)	Noongar; Wangai; Yamatji	21 August 2010	21 May 2022	11 years, 273 days	
4	Nova Peris	Labor	Senate	Northern Territory	Gija (WA); Iwaidja; Yawuru (WA)	7 September 2013	9 May 2016	2 years, 245 days	
5	Joanna Lindgren	Liberal National (Note: Lindgren sat in the Liberal party room.)	Senate	Queensland	Jagera; Mununjali	21 May 2015	2 July 2016	1 year, 42 days	
6	Pat Dodson	Labor	Senate	Western Australia	Yawuru	28 April 2016	26 January 2024	7 years, 273 days	
7	Linda Burney	Labor	House	Barton (NSW)	Wiradjuri	2 July 2016	3 May 2025	8 years, 305 days	
8	Malarndirri McCarthy	Labor	Senate	Northern Territory	Yanyuwa	2 July 2016	incumbent	10 years, 139 days	
9	Lidia Thorpe	Greens	Senate	Victoria	Djab Wurrung; Gunai; Gunditjmara	4 September 2020	6 February 2023	6 years, 75 days	
9	Lidia Thorpe	Independent	Senate	Victoria	Djab Wurrung; Gunai; Gunditjmara	6 February 2023	incumbent	6 years, 75 days	
10	Dorinda Cox	Greens	Senate	Western Australia	Yamatji; Noongar	14 September 2021	2 June 2025	5 years, 65 days	
10	Dorinda Cox	Labor	Senate	Western Australia	Yamatji; Noongar	2 June 2025	incumbent	5 years, 65 days	
11	Jana Stewart	Labor	Senate	Victoria	Muthi Muthi; Wemba-Wemba	6 April 2022	incumbent	4 years, 226 days	
12	Jacinta Nampijinpa Price	Country Liberal (Note: Price sat in the National party room until 8 May 2026 and has sat in the Liberal party room since.)	Senate	Northern Territory	Warlpiri	21 May 2022	incumbent	4 years, 181 days	
13	Gordon Reid	Labor	House	Robertson (NSW)	Wiradjuri	21 May 2022	incumbent	4 years, 181 days	
14	Marion Scrymgour	Labor	House	Lingiari (NT)	Tiwi	21 May 2022	incumbent	4 years, 181 days	
15	Kerrynne Liddle	Liberal	Senate	South Australia	Arrernte	1 July 2022	incumbent	4 years, 140 days	

Five other members of the federal parliament have acknowledged Indigenous ancestry, but are or were not generally regarded as Indigenous themselves.

No.	Name	Party	Chamber	Constituency	Ancestry	Term start	Term end	Ref
1	David Kennedy	Labor	House	Bendigo (Vic)	Palawa (Tas)	7 June 1969	2 December 1972	
2	Mal Brough	Liberal	House	Longman (Qld)	unknown (WA)	2 March 1996	24 November 2007	
2	Mal Brough	Liberal National (Note: Brough sat in the Liberal party room.)	House	Fisher (Qld)	unknown (WA)	7 September 2013	9 May 2016	
3	Kerry Rea	Labor	House	Bonner (Qld)	not stated	24 November 2007	21 August 2010	
4	Jacqui Lambie	Palmer United	Senate	Tasmania	Palawa	1 July 2014	24 November 2014	
4	Jacqui Lambie	Independent	Senate	Tasmania	Palawa	24 November 2014	14 May 2015	
4	Jacqui Lambie	JLN	Senate	Tasmania	Palawa	14 May 2015	14 November 2017	
4	Jacqui Lambie	JLN	Senate	Tasmania	Palawa	1 July 2019	incumbent	
5	Matt Smith	Labor	House	Leichhardt (Qld)	unknown	3 May 2025	incumbent	

== Parliament of the Australian Capital Territory ==
One Indigenous Australian person has been a member of the unicameral Australian Capital Territory Legislative Assembly.

No.	Name	Party	Constituency	Origin	Term start	Term end	Ref
1	Chris Bourke	Labor	Ginninderra	Gamilaraay (NSW–Qld)	1 June 2011	15 October 2016	

One other member of the Parliament of the Australian Capital Territory has acknowledged Indigenous ancestry, but is not generally regarded as Indigenous himself.

No.	Name	Party	Constituency	Origin	Term start	Term end	Ref
1	Mark Parton	Liberal	Brindabella	Noongar (WA)	15 October 2016	incumbent	

== Parliament of New South Wales ==
Four Indigenous Australians have been a members of the Parliament of New South Wales.

No.	Name	Party	Chamber	Constituency	Origin	Term start	Term end	Ref
1	Linda Burney	Labor	Legislative Assembly	Canterbury	Wiradjuri	22 March 2003	6 May 2016	
2	Lynda Voltz	Labor	Legislative Council	Statewide		24 March 2007	28 February 2019	
2	Lynda Voltz	Labor	Legislative Assembly	Auburn		23 March 2019	incumbent	
3	Jai Rowell	Liberal	Legislative Assembly	Wollondilly		26 March 2011	17 December 2018	
4	Greg Warren	Labor	Legislative Assembly	Campbelltown	Yuin	28 March 2015	incumbent	

== Parliament of the Northern Territory ==
Twenty-four Indigenous Australian people have been members of the unicameral Parliament of the Northern Territory.

No.	Name	Party	Constituency	Origin	Term start	Term end	Ref
1	Hyacinth Tungutalum	Country Liberal	Tiwi	Tiwi	19 October 1974	13 August 1977	
2	Neville Perkins	Labor	MacDonnell	Arrernte	13 August 1977	6 March 1981	
3	Wes Lanhupuy	Labor	Arnhem	Yolŋu	3 December 1983	25 August 1995	
4	Stan Tipiloura	Labor	Arafura	Tiwi	7 March 1987	20 September 1992	
5	Maurice Rioli	Labor	Arafura	Tiwi	7 November 1992	17 August 2001	
6	Jack Ah Kit	Labor	Arnhem	Arrernte	7 October 1995	18 June 2005	
7	Matthew Bonson	Labor	Millner		18 August 2001	8 August 2008	
8	Elliot McAdam	Labor	Barkly	Jingili	18 August 2001	8 August 2008	
9	Marion Scrymgour	Labor	Arafura	Tiwi	18 August 2001	4 June 2009	
9	Marion Scrymgour	Independent	Arafura	Tiwi	4 June 2009	4 August 2009	
9	Marion Scrymgour	Labor	Arafura	Tiwi	4 August 2009	6 August 2012	
10	Alison Anderson	Labor	MacDonnell	Arrernte	18 June 2005	4 August 2009	
10	Alison Anderson	Independent	MacDonnell	Arrernte	4 August 2009	9 September 2011	
10	Alison Anderson	Country Liberal	MacDonnell	Arrernte	9 September 2011	25 August 2012	
10	Alison Anderson	Country Liberal	Namatjira	Arrernte	25 August 2012	4 April 2014	
10	Alison Anderson	Independent	Namatjira	Arrernte	4 April 2014	27 April 2014	
10	Alison Anderson	Palmer United	Namatjira	Arrernte	27 April 2014	29 November 2014	
10	Alison Anderson	Independent	Namatjira	Arrernte	29 November 2014	8 August 2016	
11	Malarndirri McCarthy	Labor	Arnhem	Yanyuwa	18 June 2005	6 August 2012	
12	Karl Hampton	Labor	Stuart	Warlpiri; Ngulikan; Marra	23 September 2006	6 August 2012	
13	Adam Giles	Country Liberal	Braitling	Gamilaraay (NSW–Qld)	9 August 2008	27 August 2016	
14	Francis Xavier Kurrupuwu	Country Liberal	Arafura	Tiwi	25 August 2012	4 April 2014	
14	Francis Xavier Kurrupuwu	Independent	Arafura	Tiwi	4 April 2014	27 April 2014	
14	Francis Xavier Kurrupuwu	Palmer United	Arafura	Tiwi	27 April 2014	8 September 2014	
14	Francis Xavier Kurrupuwu	Country Liberal	Arafura	Tiwi	8 September 2014	27 August 2016	
15	Larisa Lee	Country Liberal	Arnhem	Jawoyn	25 August 2012	4 April 2014	
15	Larisa Lee	Independent	Arnhem	Jawoyn	4 April 2014	27 April 2014	
15	Larisa Lee	Palmer United	Arnhem	Jawoyn	27 April 2014	29 November 2014	
15	Larisa Lee	Independent	Arnhem	Jawoyn	29 November 2014	27 August 2016	
16	Ken Vowles	Labor	Johnston		25 August 2012	31 January 2020	
17	Bess Price	Country Liberal	Stuart	Warlpiri	25 August 2012	27 August 2016	
18	Lawrence Costa	Labor	Arafura	Tiwi	27 August 2016	17 December 2022	
19	Ngaree Ah Kit	Labor	Karama		27 August 2016	24 August 2024	
20	Selena Uibo	Labor	Arnhem	Nunggubuyu; Anindilyakwa	27 August 2016	incumbent	
21	Chansey Paech	Labor	Namatjira	Eastern Arrernte; Gurindji	27 August 2016	incumbent	
22	Yingiya Mark Guyula	Independent	Nhulunbuy	Yolŋu	27 August 2016	22 August 2020	
22	Yingiya Mark Guyula	Independent	Mulka	Yolŋu	22 August 2020	19 August 2026	
23	Dheran Young	Labor	Daly	Yaegl (NSW)	11 September 2021	incumbent	
24	Manuel Brown	Labor	Arafura	Tiwi	18 March 2023	incumbent	
25	Yiwarr McGrath	Labor	Mulka	Yolŋu	12 September 2026	incumbent	

== Parliament of Queensland ==
Five Indigenous Australian people have been members of the unicameral Parliament of Queensland.

No.	Name	Party	Constituency	Origin	Term start	Term end	Ref
1	Eric Deeral	Country	Cook	Guugu Yimithirr	7 December 1974	12 November 1977	
2	Leeanne Enoch	Labor	Algester	Nunukul; Quandamooka	31 January 2015	incumbent	
3	Billy Gordon	Labor	Cook		31 January 2015	29 March 2015	
3	Billy Gordon	Independent	Cook		29 March 2015	25 November 2017	
4	Cynthia Lui	Labor	Cook	Torres Strait Islander	25 November 2017	26 October 2024	
5	Lance McCallum	Labor	Bundamba	Gubbi Gubbi	28 March 2020	incumbent	

== Parliament of South Australia ==
One Indigenous Australian person has been a member of the Parliament of South Australia.

No.	Name	Party	Chamber	Constituency	Origin	Term start	Term end	Ref
1	Kyam Maher	Labor	Legislative Council	Statewide	Palawa (Tas)	17 October 2012	incumbent	

== Parliament of Tasmania ==
Two Indigenous Australian people have been a member of the Parliament of Tasmania.

No.	Name	Party	Chamber	Constituency	Origin	Term start	Term end	Ref
1	Kathryn Hay	Labor	House of Assembly	Bass	Noongar (WA)	20 July 2002	18 March 2006	
2	Jennifer Houston	Labor	House of Assembly	Bass	Palawa	3 March 2018	13 May 2021	

One other member of the Parliament of Tasmania has acknowledged Indigenous ancestry, but is not generally regarded as Indigenous himself.

No.	Name	Party	Chamber	Constituency	Ancestry	Term start	Term end	Ref
1	Paul Harriss	Independent	Legislative Council	Huon		25 May 1996	24 February 2014	
1	Paul Harriss	Liberal	House of Assembly	Franklin		15 March 2014	18 February 2016	

== Parliament of Victoria ==
Two Indigenous Australian people have been members of the Parliament of Victoria.

No.	Name	Party	Chamber	Constituency	Origin	Term start	Term end	Ref
1	Lidia Thorpe	Greens	Legislative Assembly	Northcote	Djab Wurrung; Gunai; Gunditjmara	18 November 2017	24 November 2018	
2	Sheena Watt	Labor	Legislative Council	Northern Metropolitan	Yorta Yorta	13 October 2020	incumbent	

At least two members have had acknowledged Indigenous ancestry, but were not generally regarded as Indigenous themselves.

No.	Name	Party	Chamber	Constituency	Ancestry	Term start	Term end	Ref
1	Cyril Kennedy	Labor	Legislative Council	Waverley	Palawa (Tas)	5 May 1979	2 October 1992	
2	David Kennedy	Labor	Legislative Assembly	Bendigo	Palawa (Tas)	3 April 1982	1 March 1985	
2	David Kennedy	Labor	Legislative Assembly	Bendigo West	Palawa (Tas)	1 March 1985	2 October 1992	

== Parliament of Western Australia ==
Four Indigenous Australian people have been members of the Parliament of Western Australia, all of whom were elected to the Legislative Assembly until Rosetta Sahanna was elected to the Legislative Council in 2021.

No.	Name	Party	Chamber	Constituency	Origin	Term start	Term end	Ref
1	Ernie Bridge	Labor	Legislative Assembly	Kimberley		23 February 1980	27 July 1996	
1	Ernie Bridge	Independent	Legislative Assembly	Kimberley		27 July 1996	10 February 2001	
2	Carol Martin	Labor	Legislative Assembly	Kimberley		10 February 2001	9 March 2013	
3	Ben Wyatt	Labor	Legislative Assembly	Victoria Park	Yamatji	11 March 2006	13 March 2021	
4	Josie Farrer	Labor	Legislative Assembly	Kimberley	Gija	9 March 2013	13 March 2021	
5	Divina D'Anna	Labor	Legislative Assembly	Kimberley	Yawuru; Nimanburru; Bardi	13 March 2021	incumbent	
6	Rosetta Sahanna	Labor	Legislative Council	Mining and Pastoral	Wilinggin	22 May 2021	21 May 2025	

One other member of the Parliament of Western Australia has acknowledged Indigenous ancestry, but is not generally regarded as Indigenous himself.

No.	Name	Party	Chamber	Constituency	Ancestry	Term start	Term end	Ref
1	Zak Kirkup	Liberal	Legislative Assembly	Dawesville	Yamatji	11 March 2017	13 March 2021	

== Notable unsuccessful candidates ==
Many Indigenous Australians have also stood unsuccessfully for office. This is a list of other notable Indigenous Australians to have run in state, territory or federal elections.

Name	Party	Constituency	Election	Origin	Ref
Harold Blair	Labor	Mentone	1964 Victoria		
Oodgeroo Noonuccal	Labor	Greenslopes	1969 Queensland	Nunukul	
Oodgeroo Noonuccal	Democrats	Redlands	1983 Queensland	Nunukul	
Gordon Briscoe	Australia	Northern Territory (HoR division)	1972 federal	Marduntjara; Pitjantjatjara	
Pat Eatock	Independent	Australian Capital Territory (HoR division)	1972 federal	Gayiri	
Pat O'Shane	Communist	New South Wales (Senate)	1974 federal	Kuku Yalanji	
Pat O'Shane	Socialist Alliance	Leichhardt	2022 federal	Kuku Yalanji	
Gatjil Djerrkura	Country Liberal	Arnhem	1980 Northern Territory	Wanguri Yolŋu	
Rosalie Kunoth-Monks	Country Liberal	MacDonnell	1980 Northern Territory	Anmatyerr; Arrernte	
Rosalie Kunoth-Monks	Country Liberal	MacDonnell	1981 MacDonnell by-election (Northern Territory)	Anmatyerr; Arrernte	
Rosalie Kunoth-Monks	First Nations	Northern Territory (Senate)	2013 federal	Anmatyerr; Arrernte	
Galarrwuy Yunupingu	Independent	Northern Territory (HoR division)	1980 federal	Gumatj Yolŋu	
Burnum Burnum	Independent	New South Wales (Senate)	1983 federal	Woiwurrung; Wurundjeri; Yorta Yorta	
Burnum Burnum	Independent	New South Wales (Senate)	1984 federal	Woiwurrung; Wurundjeri; Yorta Yorta	
Burnum Burnum	Democrats	North Shore	1988 North Shore by-election (New South Wales)	Woiwurrung; Wurundjeri; Yorta Yorta	
Vincent Forrester	Independent	Northern Territory (Senate)	1984 federal	Arrernte; Luritja	
Vincent Forrester	Independent	Stuart	1987 Northern Territory	Arrernte; Luritja	
Vincent Forrester	Independent	MacDonnell	2005 Northern Territory	Arrernte; Luritja	
Vincent Forrester	Greens	Namatjira	2016 Northern Territory	Arrernte; Luritja	
Getano Lui (Jnr)	National	Cook	1986 Queensland	Torres Strait Islander	
Michael Mansell	Independent	Tasmania (Senate)	1987 federal	Pinterrairer Palawa; Trawlwoolway Palawa	
Ruby Hammond	Independent	Port Adelaide	1988 Port Adelaide by-election (federal)	Arrernte; Tanganekald Ngarrindjeri	
Darby McCarthy	Indigenous Peoples	Clayfield	1992 Queensland	Gunggari	
Darby McCarthy	Indigenous Peoples	Queensland (Senate)	1993 federal	Gunggari	
Clarrie Isaacs	Independent	Fremantle	1993 Western Australia	Noongar	
Clarrie Isaacs	Racism No!	South Metropolitan Region	1996 Western Australia	Noongar	
Clarrie Isaacs	Independent	Western Australia (Senate)	2001 federal	Noongar	
Sam Watson	Indigenous Peoples	Fisher	1993 federal	Birri Gubba; Mununjali Yugambeh	
Sam Watson	Indigenous Peoples	Queensland (Senate)	1996 federal	Birri Gubba; Mununjali Yugambeh	
Sam Watson	Independent Socialist Alliance (Note: While Watson appeared on the ballot paper as an independent on these occasions, he was endorsed by Socialist Alliance, which was not registered with the relevant electoral commission for those elections.)	Queensland (Senate)	2001 federal	Birri Gubba; Mununjali Yugambeh	
Sam Watson	Socialist Alliance	Queensland (Senate)	2004 federal	Birri Gubba; Mununjali Yugambeh	
Sam Watson	Independent Socialist Alliance	Brisbane Central	2006 Queensland	Birri Gubba; Mununjali Yugambeh	
Sam Watson	Socialist Alliance	Queensland (Senate)	2007 federal	Birri Gubba; Mununjali Yugambeh	
Sam Watson	Independent Socialist Alliance	South Brisbane	2009 Queensland	Birri Gubba; Mununjali Yugambeh	
Sam Watson	Socialist Alliance	Queensland (Senate)	2010 federal	Birri Gubba; Mununjali Yugambeh	
Cedric Wyatt	Liberal	Kalgoorlie	1996 federal	Yamatji	
Warren Mundine	Labor	Dubbo	1999 New South Wales	Bundjalung; Gumbaynggirr; Yuin	
Warren Mundine	Labor	New South Wales (Senate)	2001 federal	Bundjalung; Gumbaynggirr; Yuin	
Warren Mundine	Labor	Legislative Council (statewide)	2003 New South Wales	Bundjalung; Gumbaynggirr; Yuin	
Warren Mundine	Liberal	Gilmore	2019 federal	Bundjalung; Gumbaynggirr; Yuin	
Geoff Clark	Independent	Frankston East	1999 Victoria (supplementary)	Gunditjmara	
Andrea Mason	Family First	Adelaide	2002 South Australia	Karonie; Ngaanyatjarra	
Andrea Mason	Family First	South Australia (Senate)	2004 federal	Karonie; Ngaanyatjarra	
Tauto Sansbury	Independent No Empty Promises Just Results	Legislative Council (statewide)	2002 South Australia	Narungga	
Tauto Sansbury	Labor	Flinders	2010 South Australia	Narungga	
Tauto Sansbury	Labor	Grey	2010 federal	Narungga	
Richard Frankland	Independent Your Voice (Note: While Frankland appeared on the ballot paper as an independent, he was endorsed by the Indigenous-focussed party Your Voice, which was not registered with the Australian Electoral Commission.)	Victoria	2004 federal	Gunditjmara	
Kado Muir	Greens	Kalgoorlie	2004 federal	Ngalia	
Kado Muir	Greens	Mining and Pastoral Region	2005 Western Australia	Ngalia	
Kado Muir	Greens	Western Australia (Senate)	2010 federal	Ngalia	
Kado Muir	Greens	Mining and Pastoral Region	2013 Western Australia	Ngalia	
Kado Muir	Nationals	Western Australia (Senate)	2016 federal	Ngalia	
Mark West	Family First	Solomon	2004 federal		
Marcia Ella-Duncan	Greens	New South Wales (Senate)	2007 federal	Yuin	
Warren H Williams	Greens	Northern Territory (Senate)	2010 federal	Arrernte	
Warren H Williams	First Nations	Namatjira	2012 Northern Territory	Arrernte	
Warren H Williams	Greens	Northern Territory (Senate)	2013 federal	Arrernte	
Russell Jeffrey	Labor	Brennan	2012 Northern Territory		
Dean Rioli	Labor	Arafura	2012 Northern Territory	Tiwi	
Eileen Cummings	First Nations	Solomon	2013 federal	Ngalakgan	
Des Headland	Palmer United	Durack	2013 federal	Noongar; Yamatji	
Des Headland	Palmer United	Western Australia (Senate)	2014 special Western Australia Senate (federal)	Noongar; Yamatji	
David Wirrpanda	Nationals	Western Australia (Senate)	2013 federal	Yolŋu; Yorta Yorta	
Ken Canning	Socialist Alliance	New South Wales (Senate)	2016 federal	Bidjara	
Josephine Cashman	One Nation	Lyne	2022 federal	Worimi	
Rod Jensen	Katter's Australian	Leichhardt	2022 federal		
Celeste Liddle	Greens	Cooper	2022 federal	Arrernte	

== See also ==
- Māori politics
- List of Asian Australian politicians
- List of Jewish Australian members of parliament
- List of Indigenous Australians in politics and public service
- Uluru Statement from the Heart
