= Electoral results for the division of Arafura =

This is a list of electoral results for the Electoral division of Arafura in Northern Territory elections.

== Members for Arafura ==
Member	Party	Term
Bob Collins	Labor Party	1983–1987
Stan Tipiloura	Labor Party	1987–1992
Maurice Rioli	Labor Party	1992–2001
Marion Scrymgour	Labor Party	2001–2009
Marion Scrymgour	Independent	2009
Marion Scrymgour	Labor Party	2009–2012
Francis Xavier Kurrupuwu	Country Liberal Party	2012–2014
Francis Xavier Kurrupuwu	Independent	2014
Francis Xavier Kurrupuwu	Palmer United Party	2014
Francis Xavier Kurrupuwu	Country Liberal Party	2014-2016
Lawrence Costa	Labor Party	2016–2022
Manuel Brown	Labor Party	2023–present

== Election results ==
=== Elections in the 2020s ===
2024 Northern Territory general election: Arafura
Party	Candidate	Votes	%	±%
Labor	Manuel Brown	1,887	69.7	+20.7
Country Liberal	Yanja Thompson	821	30.3	−9.8
Total formal votes		2,708	97.9	+3.1
Informal votes		57	2.1	−3.1
Turnout		2,765	44.6	−8.1
Labor hold		Swing	+16.1	

2023 Arafura by-election
Party	Candidate	Votes	%	±%
Labor	Manuel Brown	2,038	66.7	+17.7
Country Liberal	Leslie Tungatalum	897	29.4	−10.7
Federation	Alan Middleton	120	3.9	+3.9
Total formal votes		3,055	95.1	+0.3
Informal votes		159	4.9	−0.3
Turnout		3,214	58.1	+5.4
Two-party-preferred result
Labor	Manuel Brown	2,113	69.2	+15.6
Country Liberal	Leslie Tungatalum	942	30.8	−15.6
Labor hold		Swing	+15.6	

2020 Northern Territory general election: Arafura
Party	Candidate	Votes	%	±%
Labor	Lawrence Costa	1,269	49.0	+0.6
Country Liberal	Gibson Illortaminni	1,041	40.2	+4.4
Independent	Tristan Mungatopi	199	7.7	+3.5
Territory Alliance	George Laughton	82	3.2	+3.2
Total formal votes		2,591	94.8	N/A
Informal votes		142	5.2	N/A
Turnout		2,733	52.7	N/A
Two-party-preferred result
Labor	Lawrence Costa	1,388	53.6	−3.7
Country Liberal	Gibson Illortaminni	1,203	46.4	+3.7
Labor hold		Swing	−3.7	

=== Elections in the 2010s ===
2016 Northern Territory general election: Arafura
Party	Candidate	Votes	%	±%
Labor	Lawrence Costa	1,087	46.3	+11.7
Country Liberal	Francis Xavier Kurrupuwu	903	38.4	–5.5
1 Territory	Jon Lotu	284	12.1	+12.1
Independent	Tristan Mungatopi	75	3.2	+3.2
Total formal votes		2,349	98.6	N/A
Informal votes		34	1.4	N/A
Turnout		2,383	49.2	N/A
Two-party-preferred result
Labor	Lawrence Costa	1,234	54.7	+7.2
Country Liberal	Francis Xavier Kurrupuwu	1,020	45.3	−7.2
Labor gain from Country Liberal		Swing	+7.2	

2012 Northern Territory general election: Arafura
Party	Candidate	Votes	%	±%
Country Liberal	Francis Maralampuwi Xavier	1,308	43.1	+6.6
Labor	Dean Rioli	1,104	36.4	−9.7
Greens	George Pascoe	426	14.1	+14.1
First Nations	Jeannie Gadambua	194	6.4	+6.4
Total formal votes		3,032	95.3	N/A
Informal votes		148	4.7	N/A
Turnout		3,180	58.1	N/A
Two-party-preferred result
Country Liberal	Francis Maralampuwi Xavier	1,547	51.0	+15.0
Labor	Dean Rioli	1,485	49.0	−15.0
Country Liberal gain from Labor		Swing	+15.0	

=== Elections in the 2000s ===
2008 Northern Territory general election: Arafura
Party	Candidate	Votes	%	±%
Labor	Marion Scrymgour	1,300	46.1	−18.0
Country Liberal	Tristan Mungatopi	544	19.3	−3.0
Independent	Jone Lotu	487	17.3	+17.3
Country Liberal	Angie Siebert	486	17.3	+17.3
Total formal votes		2,817	94.0	N/A
Informal votes		179	6.0	N/A
Turnout		2,996	60.8	N/A
Two-party-preferred result
Labor	Marion Scrymgour	1,802	64.0	−9.6
Country Liberal	Tristan Mungatopi	1,015	36.0	+9.6
Labor hold		Swing	−9.6	

2005 Northern Territory general election: Arafura
Party	Candidate	Votes	%	±%
Labor	Marion Scrymgour	1,864	64.2	+18.6
Country Liberal	August Stevens	648	22.3	−1.6
Greens	George Pascoe	392	13.5	+13.5
Total formal votes		2,904	95.1	N/A
Informal votes		149	4.9	N/A
Turnout		3,053	66.2	N/A
Two-party-preferred result
Labor	Marion Scrymgour	2,137	73.6	+13.6
Country Liberal	August Stevens	767	26.4	−13.6
Labor hold		Swing	+13.6	

2001 Northern Territory general election: Arafura
Party	Candidate	Votes	%	±%
Labor	Marion Scrymgour	1,176	45.6	−13.4
Independent	John Christophersen	650	25.2	+25.2
Country Liberal	Marius Puruntatameri	618	24.0	−17.0
Independent	Dorothy Fox	135	5.2	+5.2
Total formal votes		2,579	91.3	N/A
Informal votes		246	8.7	N/A
Turnout		2,825	67.1	N/A
Two-party-preferred result
Labor	Marion Scrymgour	1,520	58.9	−0.1
Country Liberal	Marius Puruntatameri	1,095	41.1	+0.1
Two-candidate-preferred result
Labor	Marion Scrymgour	1,586	61.5	+2.5
Independent	John Christophersen	993	38.5	+38.5
Labor hold		Swing	N/A	

=== Elections in the 1990s ===
1997 Northern Territory general election: Arafura
Party	Candidate	Votes	%	±%
Labor	Maurice Rioli	1,552	59.0	−1.7
Country Liberal	Jacob Nayinggul	1,078	41.0	+25.6
Total formal votes		2,630	93.3	N/A
Informal votes		188	6.7	N/A
Turnout		2,818	66.7	N/A
Labor hold		Swing	−19.0	

1994 Northern Territory general election: Arafura
Party	Candidate	Votes	%	±%
Labor	Maurice Rioli	1,381	60.8	−5.7
Independent	Colin Newton	540	23.8	+23.8
Country Liberal	Lothar Siebert	349	15.4	−18.1
Total formal votes		2,270	90.4	N/A
Informal votes		240	9.6	N/A
Turnout		2,510	67.6	N/A
Two-party-preferred result
Labor	Maurice Rioli	1,481	65.3	−1.8
Country Liberal	Lothar Siebert	789	34.7	+1.8
Labor hold		Swing	−1.8	

- The two candidate preferred vote was not counted between the Labor and Independent candidates for Arafura.

1992 Arafura by-election
Party	Candidate	Votes	%	±%
Labor	Maurice Rioli	1,448	64.0	−2.5
Country Liberal	Bernard Tipiloura	684	30.3	−3.2
Independent	Colin Newton	129	5.7	+5.7
Total formal votes		2,261	90.3	N/A
Informal votes		243	9.7	N/A
Turnout		2,504	65.3	N/A
Labor hold		Swing	N/A	

- Preferences were not distributed.

1990 Northern Territory general election: Arafura
Party	Candidate	Votes	%	±%
Labor	Stan Tipiloura	1,431	66.5	+2.6
Country Liberal	Barry Puruntatameri	721	33.5	+12.3
Total formal votes		2,152	94.7	N/A
Informal votes		121	5.3	N/A
Turnout		2,273	67.8	N/A
Labor hold		Swing	−6.7	

=== Elections in the 1980s ===
1987 Northern Territory general election: Arafura
Party	Candidate	Votes	%	±%
Labor	Stan Tipiloura	1,211	63.9	+13.1
Country Liberal	Dorothy Fox	402	21.2	−10.6
NT Nationals	Peter Watton	281	14.8	+14.8
Total formal votes		1,894	93.5	N/A
Informal votes		132	6.5	N/A
Turnout		2,026	64.3	N/A
Two-party-preferred result
Labor	Stan Tipiloura	1,286	67.9	+5.9
Country Liberal	Dorothy Fox	608	32.1	−5.9
Labor hold		Swing	+5.9	

1983 Northern Territory general election: Arafura
Party	Candidate	Votes	%	±%
Labor	Bob Collins	930	50.8	N/A
Country Liberal	Robert Woodward	582	31.8	N/A
Democrats	Kevin Doolan	318	17.4	N/A
Total formal votes		1,830	95.3	N/A
Informal votes		91	4.7	N/A
Turnout		1,921	69.5	N/A
Two-party-preferred result
Labor	Bob Collins	1,129	61.7	N/A
Country Liberal	Robert Woodward	701	38.3	N/A
Labor win		(new seat)		
