= Electoral results for the district of Kimberley =

Western Australian district election results

This is a list of electoral results for the electoral district of Kimberley in Western Australian state elections.

== Members for Kimberley ==
Member	Party	Term
Francis Connor	Independent	1904–1905
Arthur Male	Ministerial	1905–1911
Arthur Male	Liberal (WA)	1911–1917
Michael Durack	Nationalist	1917–1920
Michael Durack	Country	1920–1923
Michael Durack	Country (MCP)	1923–1924
Aubrey Coverley	Labor	1924–1953
John Rhatigan	Labor	1953–1968
Alan Ridge	Liberal	1968–1980
Ernie Bridge	Labor	1980–1996
Ernie Bridge	Independent	1996–2001
Carol Martin	Labor	2001–2013
Josie Farrer	Labor	2013–2021
Divina D'Anna	Labor	2021–present

== Election results ==
=== Elections in the 2020s ===
2025 Western Australian state election: Kimberley
Party	Candidate	Votes	%	±%
Labor	Divina D'Anna	4,574	43.4	−10.5
Liberal	Darren Spackman	2,351	22.3	+1.8
Greens	Jaala Edith Ozies	1,848	17.5	+2.5
National	Millie Hills	1,169	11.1	+4.9
Christians	Zoe Golding	605	5.7	+5.7
Total formal votes		10,547	96.5	+0.2
Informal votes		386	3.5	−0.2
Turnout		10,933	59.3	−7.6

Results are not final. Last updated on 31 March 2025 at 6:30 PM AWST

2021 Western Australian state election: Kimberley
Party	Candidate	Votes	%	±%
Labor	Divina D'Anna	5,747	53.9	+9.0
Liberal	Geoff Haerewa	2,187	20.5	+3.2
Greens	Naomi Pigram	1,601	15.0	+5.8
National	Millie Hills	658	6.2	−10.1
One Nation	Roger Modolo	221	2.1	−6.0
Independent	Kai Jones	98	0.9	−1.0
No Mandatory Vaccination	A. Herman	85	0.8	+0.8
Western Australia	Karl Fehlauer	68	0.6	+0.6
Total formal votes		10,665	96.3	+0.4
Informal votes		410	3.7	−0.4
Turnout		11,075	70.4	−9.2
Two-party-preferred result
Labor	Divina D'Anna	7,618	71.5	+8.3
Liberal	Geoff Haerewa	3,044	28.5	−8.3
Labor hold		Swing	+8.3	

=== Elections in the 2010s ===
2017 Western Australian state election: Kimberley
Party	Candidate	Votes	%	±%
Labor	Josie Farrer	5,250	44.8	+18.1
Liberal	Warren Greatorex	2,038	17.4	−8.3
National	Rob Houston	1,915	16.3	−2.0
Greens	Liz Vaughan	1,085	9.3	−14.2
One Nation	Keith Wright	952	8.1	+8.1
Independent	Kai Jones	222	1.9	+1.9
Independent	Graham Chapman	165	1.4	+1.4
Flux the System!	Ryan Albrey	92	0.8	+0.8
Total formal votes		11,719	95.9	+0.9
Informal votes		498	4.1	−0.9
Turnout		12,217	72.5	+1.7
Two-party-preferred result
Labor	Josie Farrer	7,381	63.0	+7.9
Liberal	Warren Greatorex	4,333	37.0	−7.9
Labor hold		Swing	+7.9	

2013 Western Australian state election: Kimberley
Party	Candidate	Votes	%	±%
Labor	Josie Farrer	3,030	26.7	−14.6
Liberal	Jenny Bloom	2,924	25.7	−0.3
Greens	Chris Maher	2,664	23.5	+10.1
National	Michele Pucci	2,085	18.4	+0.1
Independent	Rod Ogilvie	499	4.4	+4.4
Christians	Craig Simons	158	1.4	+1.4
Total formal votes		11,360	94.0	−1.5
Informal votes		595	6.0	+1.5
Turnout		11,955	73.0	+11.0
Two-party-preferred result
Labor	Josie Farrer	6,255	55.1	−1.7
Liberal	Jenny Bloom	5,100	44.9	+1.7
Labor hold		Swing	−1.7	

=== Elections in the 2000s ===
2008 Western Australian state election: Kimberley
Party	Candidate	Votes	%	±%
Labor	Carol Martin	4,066	41.2	−1.0
Liberal	Ruth Webb-Smith	2,566	26.0	−8.9
National	John McCourt	1,809	18.3	+18.3
Greens	Annabelle Sandes	1,320	13.4	+0.1
Citizens Electoral Council	James Ockerby	100	1.0	+1.0
Total formal votes		9,861	95.5	
Informal votes		463	4.5	
Turnout		10,324	62.0	
Two-party-preferred result
Labor	Carol Martin	5,587	56.8	−0.1
Liberal	Ruth Webb-Smith	4,257	43.2	+0.1
Labor hold		Swing	−0.1	

2005 Western Australian state election: Kimberley
Party	Candidate	Votes	%	±%
Labor	Carol Martin	3,473	39.3	−0.4
Liberal	Ron Johnston	3,469	39.2	+21.9
Greens	Pat Lowe	1,298	14.7	+10.0
Independent	Peter Matsumoto	389	4.4	+4.4
One Nation	Maz Fiannaca	110	1.2	−10.1
Christian Democrats	Victoria Rafferty	106	1.2	+1.2
Total formal votes		8,845	95.5	−0.1
Informal votes		416	4.5	+0.1
Turnout		9,261	70.6	
Two-party-preferred result
Labor	Carol Martin	4,717	53.3	−5.2
Liberal	Ron Johnston	4,127	46.7	+5.2
Labor hold		Swing	−5.2	

2001 Western Australian state election: Kimberley
Party	Candidate	Votes	%	±%
Labor	Carol Martin	4,035	42.2	+42.2
Liberal	Lyne Page	1,545	16.2	−11.9
National	Peter McCumstie	1,527	16.0	+7.2
One Nation	Wayne Boys	1,003	10.5	+10.5
Independent	Mike Wevers	865	9.1	+9.1
Greens	Andrei Nikulinsky	424	4.4	+4.4
Curtin Labor Alliance	Byrne Terry	155	1.6	+1.6
Total formal votes		9,554	95.3	−1.6
Informal votes		466	4.7	+1.6
Turnout		10,020	74.5	
Two-party-preferred result
Labor	Carol Martin	5,756	60.5	+60.5
Liberal	Lyne Page	3,752	39.5	+1.0
Labor gain from Independent		Swing	+60.5	

=== Elections in the 1990s ===
1996 Western Australian state election: Kimberley
Party	Candidate	Votes	%	±%
Independent	Ernie Bridge	2,727	33.8	+33.8
Independent	Brian Martin	2,365	29.3	+29.3
Liberal	David Parker	2,265	28.1	−8.4
National	James O'Kenny	711	8.8	+8.8
Total formal votes		8,068	96.9	−1.3
Informal votes		257	3.1	+1.3
Turnout		8,325	68.7	
Two-candidate-preferred result
Independent	Ernie Bridge	4,954	61.5	+61.5
Liberal	David Parker	3,104	38.5	+2.0
Independent gain from Labor		Swing	+61.5	

1993 Western Australian state election: Kimberley
Party	Candidate	Votes	%	±%
Labor	Ernie Bridge	5,838	65.4	−4.2
Liberal	Dale Vaughan	3,086	34.6	+4.2
Total formal votes		8,924	98.3	+0.1
Informal votes		158	1.7	−0.1
Turnout		9,082	75.8	+3.2
Labor hold		Swing	−4.2	

=== Elections in the 1980s ===
1989 Western Australian state election: Kimberley
Party	Candidate	Votes	%	±%
Labor	Ernie Bridge	5,342	69.6	+2.1
Liberal	Maxine Reid	2,337	30.4	−2.1
Total formal votes		7,679	98.2	
Informal votes		140	1.8	
Turnout		7,819	72.6	
Labor hold		Swing	+2.1	

1986 Western Australian state election: Kimberley
Party	Candidate	Votes	%	±%
Labor	Ernie Bridge	8,592	66.5	+0.6
Liberal	William Shepherd	4,323	33.5	−0.6
Total formal votes		12,915	96.7	+2.3
Informal votes		439	3.3	−2.3
Turnout		13,354	74.5	−9.8
Labor hold		Swing	+0.6	

1983 Western Australian state election: Kimberley
Party	Candidate	Votes	%	±%
Labor	Ernie Bridge	6,563	65.9	
Liberal	Robert Whitton	3,396	34.1	
Total formal votes		9,959	94.4	
Informal votes		587	5.6	
Turnout		10,546	84.3	
Labor hold		Swing		

1980 Western Australian state election: Kimberley
Party	Candidate	Votes	%	±%
Labor	Ernie Bridge	2,656	56.1	+9.2
Liberal	Alan Ridge	1,902	40.2	−9.5
Independent	Josephine Boyle	173	3.7	+3.7
Total formal votes		4,731	95.9	+4.1
Informal votes		201	4.1	−4.1
Turnout		4,932	81.5	+0.4
Two-party-preferred result
Labor	Ernie Bridge	2,742	58.0	+9.3
Liberal	Alan Ridge	1,989	42.0	−9.3
Labor gain from Liberal		Swing	+9.3	

=== Elections in the 1970s ===
1977 Kimberley state by-election
Party	Candidate	Votes	%	±%
Liberal	Alan Ridge	1,705	51.3	+1.6
Labor	Ernie Bridge	1,500	45.1	−1.8
Independent	Imelda Quilty	58	1.7	+1.7
Independent	Kelvin Archer	32	1.0	+1.0
Independent	Keith Wright	31	0.9	+0.9
Total formal votes		3,326	96.3	+4.7
Informal votes		129	3.7	−4.7
Turnout		3,455	74.0	−7.1
Liberal hold		Swing	N/A	

- Preferences were not distributed.

1977 Western Australian state election: Kimberley
Party	Candidate	Votes	%	±%
Liberal	Alan Ridge	1,726	49.7	
Labor	Ernie Bridge	1,631	46.9	
Independent	Allan Rees	118	3.4	
Total formal votes		3,475	91.8	
Informal votes		311	8.2	
Turnout		3,786	81.1	
Two-party-preferred result
Liberal	Alan Ridge	1,784	51.3	
Labor	Ernie Bridge	1,691	48.7	
Liberal hold		Swing		

1974 Western Australian state election: Kimberley
Party	Candidate	Votes	%	±%
Liberal	Alan Ridge	1,785	54.6	
Labor	Robert Baker	1,327	40.6	
National Alliance	Keith Wright	156	4.8	
Total formal votes		3,268	94.7	
Informal votes		183	5.3	
Turnout		3,451	79.3	
Two-party-preferred result
Liberal	Alan Ridge	1,918	58.7	
Labor	Robert Baker	1,350	41.3	
Liberal hold		Swing		

1971 Western Australian state election: Kimberley
Party	Candidate	Votes	%	±%
Liberal	Alan Ridge	1,364	56.1	+3.9
Labor	Patrick Weir	881	36.3	−11.5
Democratic Labor	Maurice Bailey	184	7.6	+7.6
Total formal votes		2,429	95.5	−3.4
Informal votes		113	4.5	+3.4
Turnout		2,542	80.8	+0.3
Two-party-preferred result
Liberal	Alan Ridge	1,520	62.6	+10.4
Labor	Patrick Weir	909	37.4	−10.4
Liberal hold		Swing	+10.4	

=== Elections in the 1960s ===
1968 Western Australian state election: Kimberley
Party	Candidate	Votes	%	±%
Liberal and Country	Alan Ridge	1,159	52.2	
Labor	John Rhatigan	1,060	47.8	
Total formal votes		2,219	98.9	
Informal votes		25	1.1	
Turnout		2,244	80.5	
Liberal and Country gain from Labor		Swing		

1965 Western Australian state election: Kimberley
Party	Candidate	Votes	%	±%
Labor	John Rhatigan	1,368	61.6	−17.1
Liberal and Country	George Drysdale	853	38.4	+38.4
Total formal votes		2,221	94.5	−1.6
Informal votes		130	5.5	+1.6
Turnout		2,351	79.9	+0.3
Labor hold		Swing	N/A	

1962 Western Australian state election: Kimberley
Party	Candidate	Votes	%	±%
Labor	John Rhatigan	1,098	78.7	
Independent Labor	Lenin McAlear	297	21.3	
Total formal votes		1,395	96.1	
Informal votes		56	3.9	
Turnout		1,451	79.6	
Labor hold		Swing		

=== Elections in the 1950s ===
1959 Western Australian state election: Kimberley
Party	Candidate	Votes	%	±%
Labor	John Rhatigan	650	64.0	−36.0
Liberal and Country	Nolan McDaniel	366	36.0	+36.0
Total formal votes		1,016	97.6	
Informal votes		25	2.4	
Turnout		1,041	75.2	
Labor hold		Swing	N/A	

1956 Western Australian state election: Kimberley
Party	Candidate	Votes	%	±%
Labor	John Rhatigan	unopposed		
Labor hold		Swing		

1953 Kimberley state by-election
Party	Candidate	Votes	%	±%
Labor	John Rhatigan	582	62.2	N/A
Liberal and Country	Jack Murray	264	28.2	+28.2
Independent Liberal	Sam Thomas	90	9.6	+9.6
Total formal votes		936	96.2	
Informal votes		37	3.8	
Turnout		973	80.6	N/A
Labor hold		Swing	N/A	

- Preferences were not distributed.

1953 Western Australian state election: Kimberley
Party	Candidate	Votes	%	±%
Labor	Aubrey Coverley	unopposed		
Labor hold		Swing		

1950 Western Australian state election: Kimberley
Party	Candidate	Votes	%	±%
Labor	Aubrey Coverley	unopposed		
Labor hold		Swing		

=== Elections in the 1940s ===
1947 Western Australian state election: Kimberley
Party	Candidate	Votes	%	±%
Labor	Aubrey Coverley	389	65.3	−12.0
Independent	Kimberley Durack	207	34.7	+34.7
Total formal votes		596	98.5	+0.8
Informal votes		9	1.5	−0.8
Turnout		605	70.2	−4.7
Labor hold		Swing	N/A	

1943 Western Australian state election: Kimberley
Party	Candidate	Votes	%	±%
Labor	Aubrey Coverley	334	77.3	−22.7
Nationalist	Douglas Davidson	98	22.7	+22.7
Total formal votes		432	97.7	
Informal votes		10	2.3	
Turnout		442	74.9	
Labor hold		Swing	N/A	

=== Elections in the 1930s ===
1939 Western Australian state election: Kimberley
Party	Candidate	Votes	%	±%
Labor	Aubrey Coverley	unopposed		
Labor hold		Swing		

1936 Western Australian state election: Kimberley
Party	Candidate	Votes	%	±%
Labor	Aubrey Coverley	496	84.5	+32.2
Country	Ronald Herrin	91	15.5	+15.5
Total formal votes		587	99.0	+0.7
Informal votes		6	1.0	−0.7
Turnout		593	62.5	−16.1
Labor hold		Swing	+32.2	

1933 Kimberley state by-election
Party	Candidate	Votes	%	±%
Labor	Aubrey Coverley	556	67.6	+15.3
Nationalist	Arthur Povah	267	32.4	−15.3
Total formal votes		823	98.7	+0.4
Informal votes		11	1.3	−0.4
Turnout		834	73.8	−4.8
Labor hold		Swing	+15.3	

1933 Western Australian state election: Kimberley
Party	Candidate	Votes	%	±%
Labor	Aubrey Coverley	369	52.3	−21.2
Nationalist	Arthur Povah	337	47.7	+21.2
Total formal votes		706	98.3	−0.4
Informal votes		12	1.7	+0.4
Turnout		718	78.6	+18.0
Labor hold		Swing	−21.2	

1930 Western Australian state election: Kimberley
Party	Candidate	Votes	%	±%
Labor	Aubrey Coverley	439	73.5	
Nationalist	Harold Forbes	158	26.5	
Total formal votes		588	98.7	
Informal votes		8	1.3	
Turnout		604	60.6	
Labor hold		Swing		

=== Elections in the 1920s ===
1927 Western Australian state election: Kimberley
Party	Candidate	Votes	%	±%
Labor	Aubrey Coverley	431	63.7	+30.2
Ind. Nationalist	Arthur Male	144	21.3	+21.3
Ind. Nationalist	Patrick Percy	102	15.1	+15.1
Total formal votes		677	98.1	−0.2
Informal votes		13	1.9	+0.2
Turnout		690	64.0	−3.5
Labor hold		Swing	N/A	

- Preferences were not distributed.

1924 Western Australian state election: Kimberley
Party	Candidate	Votes	%	±%
Labor	Aubrey Coverley	234	33.5	+0.2
Nationalist	George Foley	174	24.9	+24.9
Ind. Nationalist	Ancell Gregory	155	22.2	+22.2
Ind. Nationalist	William Chalmers	104	14.9	+14.9
Independent	Walter Brown	32	4.6	+4.6
Total formal votes		699	98.3	−1.0
Informal votes		12	1.7	+1.0
Turnout		711	67.5	+2.3
Two-party-preferred result
Labor	Aubrey Coverley	404	57.8	
Nationalist	George Foley	295	42.2	
Labor gain from Country		Swing	N/A	

1921 Western Australian state election: Kimberley
Party	Candidate	Votes	%	±%
Country	Michael Durack	378	51.0	−21.5
Labor	Charles Cornish	247	33.3	+15.1
Independent	William Willesee	116	15.7	+15.7
Total formal votes		741	99.3	+2.1
Informal votes		5	0.7	−2.1
Turnout		746	65.2	+12.9
Country gain from Nationalist		Swing	N/A	

=== Elections in the 1910s ===
1917 Western Australian state election: Kimberley
Party	Candidate	Votes	%	±%
Nationalist	Michael Durack	511	72.5	+72.5
Labor	James Maloney	128	18.2	+18.2
Independent Labor	John Cameron	35	5.0	+5.0
Nationalist	William Hollingsworth	31	4.4	+4.4
Total formal votes		705	97.2	n/a
Informal votes		20	2.8	n/a
Turnout		725	52.3	n/a
Nationalist hold		Swing	N/A	

1914 Western Australian state election: Kimberley
Party	Candidate	Votes	%	±%
Liberal	Arthur Male	unopposed		
Liberal hold		Swing		

1911 Western Australian state election: Kimberley
Party	Candidate	Votes	%	±%
Ministerialist	Arthur Male	418	59.3	
Labor	Thomas Brown	287	40.7	
Total formal votes		705	98.0	
Informal votes		14	2.0	
Turnout		719	41.7	
Ministerialist hold		Swing		

=== Elections in the 1900s ===
1908 Western Australian state election: Kimberley
Party	Candidate	Votes	%	±%
Ministerialist	Arthur Male	410	63.3	+7.8
Ministerialist	Michael O'Donohue	238	36.7	+36.7
Total formal votes		648	97.4	−1.8
Informal votes		17	2.6	+1.8
Turnout		665	45.6	+3.1
Ministerialist hold		Swing	N/A	

1905 Western Australian state election: Kimberley
Party	Candidate	Votes	%	±%
Ministerialist	Arthur Male	263	55.5	+55.5
Independent	Francis Connor	211	44.5	–6.6
Total formal votes		474	99.2	–0.3
Informal votes		4	0.8	+0.3
Turnout		478	42.5	–6.9
Ministerialist gain from Independent		Swing	+55.5	

1904 Western Australian state election: Kimberley
Party	Candidate	Votes	%	±%
Independent	Francis Connor	288	51.1	+51.1
Independent	Sydney Pigott	276	48.9	+48.9
Total formal votes		564	99.5	n/a
Informal votes		3	0.5	n/a
Turnout		567	49.4	n/a
Independent win		(new seat)		
