= 2023 Arafura by-election =

- 18 March 2023
- Registered: 5,536
- Turnout: 58.1%

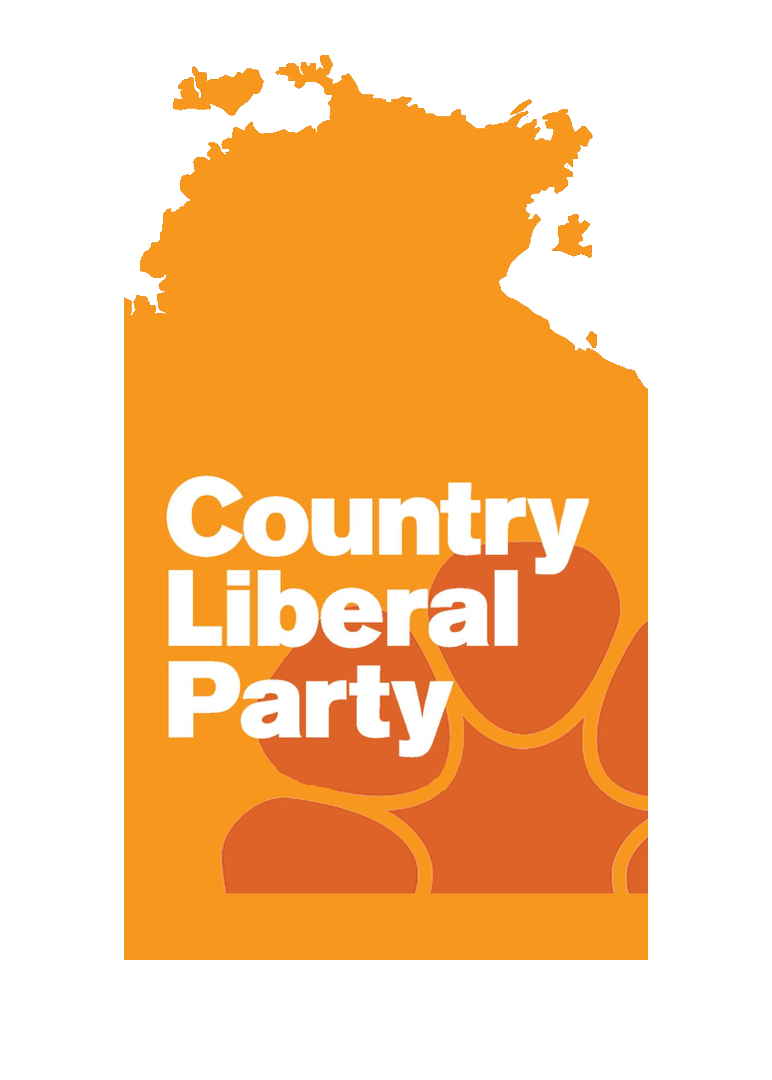
	First party	Second party
Candidate	Manuel Brown	Leslie Tungatalum
Party	Labor	Country Liberal
Popular vote	2,038	897
Percentage	66.7%	29.4%
Swing	▲17.7	▼10.8
TPP	69.2%	30.8%
TPP	▲15.6	▼15.6
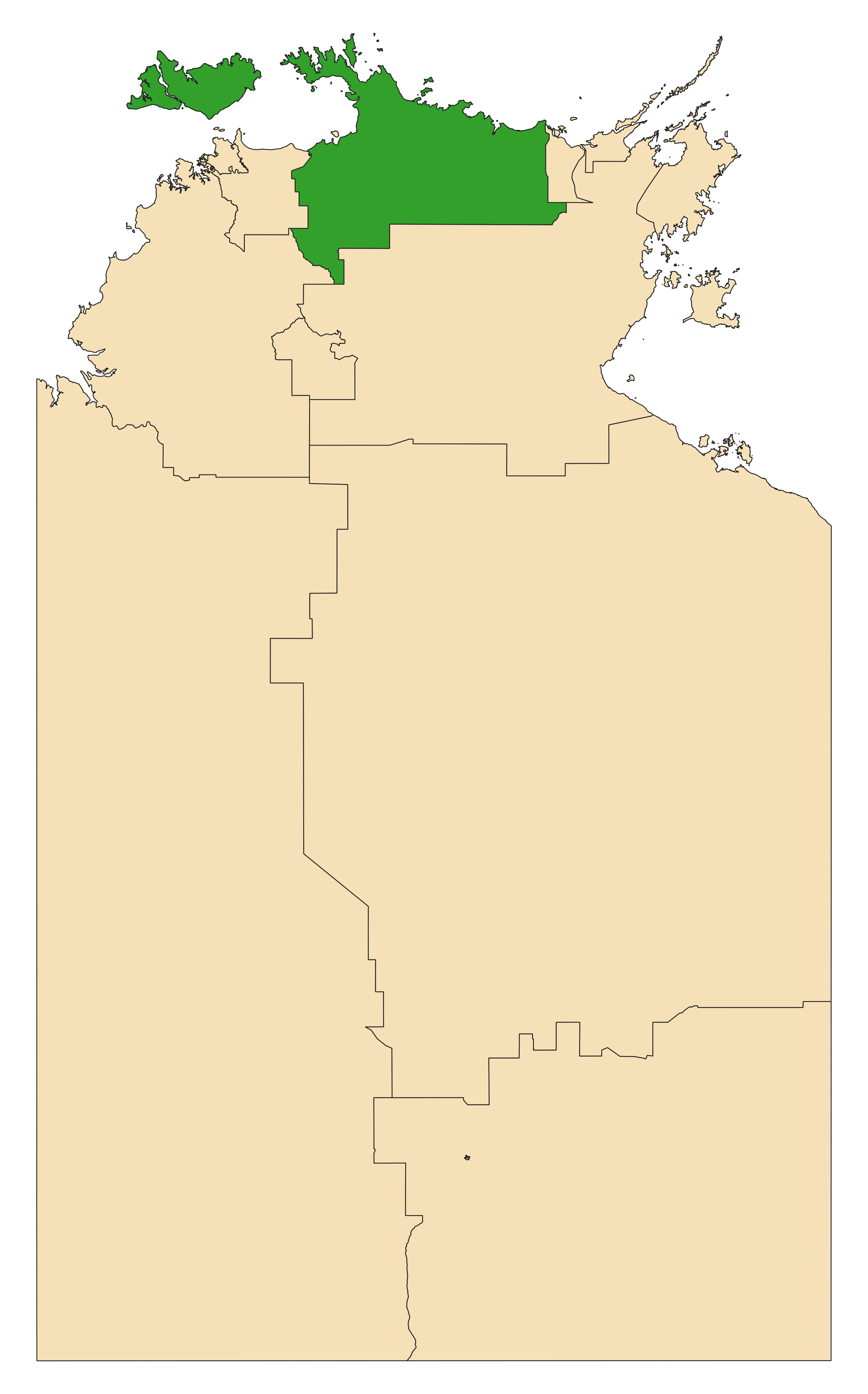
- Location of Arafura in the Northern Territory
MP before election
Lawrence Costa
Labor
Elected MP
Manuel Brown
Labor

The 2023 Arafura by-election was held on Saturday, 18 March 2023 to elect the next member of the Northern Territory Legislative Assembly for the electoral division of Arafura. The by-election was triggered by the death of incumbent Labor MP Lawrence Costa, who died on 17 December 2022 and had a state funeral held for him on 1 March. The election was won by Labor candidate Manuel Brown. Chief Minister and NT Labor leader Natasha Fyles declared victory after two hours of counting.

== Background ==
=== 2020 election results ===
2020 Northern Territory general election: Arafura
Party	Candidate	Votes	%	±%
Labor	Lawrence Costa	1,269	49.0	+0.6
Country Liberal	Gibson Illortaminni	1,041	40.2	+4.4
Independent	Tristan Mungatopi	199	7.7	+3.5
Territory Alliance	George Laughton	82	3.2	+3.2
Total formal votes		2,591	94.8	N/A
Informal votes		142	5.2	N/A
Turnout		2,733	52.7	N/A
Two-party-preferred result
Labor	Lawrence Costa	1,388	53.6	−3.7
Country Liberal	Gibson Illortaminni	1,203	46.4	+3.7
Labor hold		Swing	−3.7	

== Candidates ==
Party	Candidate	Background
Country Liberal	Leslie Tungutalum	Deputy Mayor of the Tiwi Islands Regional Council. Son of former member for Tiwi Hyacinth Tungutalum.
Labor	Manuel Brown	Former liaison officer for Costa.
Federation	Alan Middleton	Party officer.

== Results ==
2023 Arafura by-election
Party	Candidate	Votes	%	±%
Labor	Manuel Brown	2,038	66.7	+17.7
Country Liberal	Leslie Tungatalum	897	29.4	−10.7
Federation	Alan Middleton	120	3.9	+3.9
Total formal votes		3,055	95.1	+0.3
Informal votes		159	4.9	−0.3
Turnout		3,214	58.1	+5.4
Two-party-preferred result
Labor	Manuel Brown	2,113	69.2	+15.6
Country Liberal	Leslie Tungatalum	942	30.8	−15.6
Labor hold		Swing	+15.6	
