= Ernie Bridge =

Australian politician

The Honourable Ernie Bridge AM
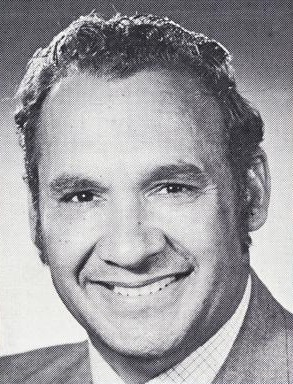

Member of the Western Australian Parliament for Kimberley
- In office 23 February 1980 – 10 February 2001
- Preceded by: Alan Ridge
- Succeeded by: Carol Martin

Personal details
- Born: Ernest Francis Bridge; 15 December 1936 Halls Creek, Western Australia, Australia
- Died: 31 March 2013 (aged 76) Perth, Western Australia
- Party: Labor (1980–1996)
- Other political affiliations: Independent (1996–2001)
- Spouse: Mavis Ida Bridge (née Granger) (1960–2009; her death)
- Children: 4

Ernest Francis Bridge, AM (15 December 1936 – 31 March 2013) was an Australian parliamentarian and country music singer. He was a member of the Western Australian Legislative Assembly from 1980 to 2001, representing the electorate of Kimberley, first as a Labor Party representative (1980–1996) and then as a Labor Independent MP (1996–2001). He was the first indigenous Australian to be a Cabinet minister in any Australian government.

== Biography ==
Bridge was born in Halls Creek; among his ancestors was First Fleet convict Matthew James Everingham. He was a pastoralist and businessman prior to entering politics, and was also a founding member of the Aboriginal Lands Trust in 1972. He served on the Halls Creek council from 1962 to 1979.

At age 4, a visiting German Pallottine priest baptised him at the Catholic mission in Balgo, making him the first person to be baptised there.

== Political career ==
Bridge contested the marginal seat of Kimberley for the Labor Party at the 1980 state election and won, defeating incumbent Liberal Alan Ridge, thus becoming the first Aboriginal member of the WA parliament. He was a backbencher for his first two terms, being re-elected at the 1983 election and 1986 election.

Bridge was promoted to the ministry by Premier Brian Burke after the return of the Labor government at the 1986 election, with his appointment as Honorary Minister assisting the Ministers for Water Resources, The North-West and Aboriginal Affairs. This made him the first indigenous politician in Australia to serve in a ministerial portfolio. He was promoted in July 1986 to Minister for Water Resources, the North-West and Aboriginal Affairs. He was shifted to the portfolio of Minister for Small Business in 1988 after the accession of Peter Dowding as Premier, but regained his old portfolios in 1989 with his appointment as Minister for Agriculture, Water Resources and the North West, a role which he held until the defeat of the Labor government at the 1993 state election.

Bridge continued as a member of the Shadow Ministry after Labor's defeat in 1993, serving as Shadow Minister for Trade from 1993 to 1994 and Shadow Minister for Aboriginal Affairs and the North West from 1993 to 1996. He resigned from the ALP, sitting as a Labor Independent and was re-elected in 1996 as the Independent Labor Member for Kimberley. He retired at the 2001 election.

In 1997, he established Unity of First People of Australia, a non-profit organisation which assists Aboriginal people in Western Australia with employment within the law and order, health and education industries.

Bridge promoted the concept of a water pipeline from the Fitzroy River to Perth. He later went on to promote a larger scale scheme including piping water from northern Queensland rivers to the south-eastern Australian cities.

In March 2013, Bridge sued a number of parties for damages after being diagnosed with several asbestos-related conditions including mesothelioma, asbestosis, and pleural disease. Bridge said he had been exposed to asbestos fibre and dust while fulfilling his ministerial duties in the 1980s, and was suing the Western Australian government, the Shire of Ashburton, CSR Limited, Midalco, Gina Rinehart's company Hancock Prospecting and Angela Bennett's Wright Prospecting.

He was married to Mavis Bridge from 1960 until her death in March 2009 and had two daughters and two sons.

== Honours ==
On 13 June 1993, Bridge received the Medal of the Order of Australia (OAM) "in recognition of service to the WA Parliament and to Aboriginal Affairs."

On 1 January 2001, he was awarded the Centenary Medal for "service to the parliament and Aboriginal affairs".

On 11 June 2012, he was named a Member of the Order of Australia (AM) for "service to the Indigenous community, particularly through support for health management programs, and to the Parliament of Western Australia."

== Discography ==
- Sings Kimberly Favourites (EMI Custom, 1979)
- "Helicopter Ringer" (EMI Custom, 1980)
- Helicopter Ringer (EMI Custom, 1980)
- Live at the Concert Hall (EMI, 1982)
- Signs It Australian (EMI, 1983)
- Great Australian Dream (1990)

=== Ernie and Noel Bridge ===
- 200 Years Ago (1994)

== See also ==
- List of Indigenous Australian politicians

Parliament of Western Australia
| Preceded by Alan Ridge | Member for Kimberley; 1980–2001 | Succeeded by Carol Martin |
