= Marion Scrymgour =

Australian politician (born 1960)

Marion Scrymgour MP
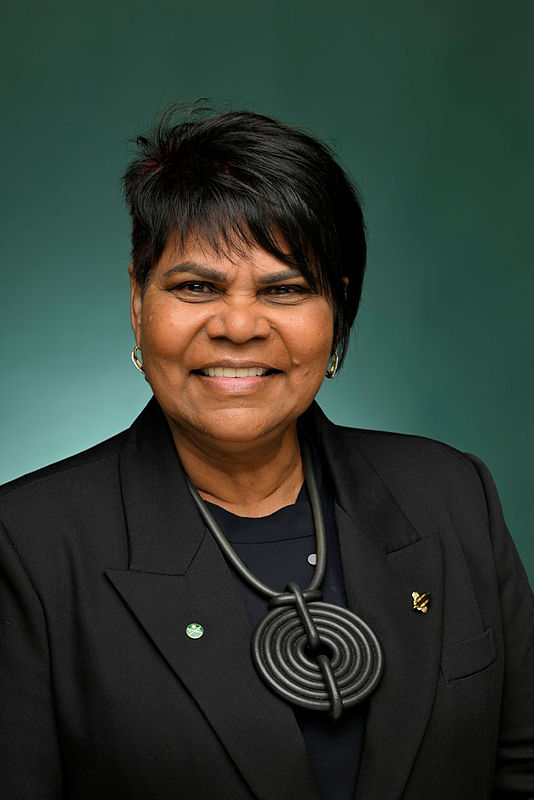
- Official portrait, 2022

Member of the Australian Parliament for Lingiari
- Incumbent
- Assumed office 21 May 2022
- Preceded by: Warren Snowdon

Deputy Chief Minister of the Northern Territory
- In office 26 November 2007 – 8 February 2009
- Preceded by: Syd Stirling
- Succeeded by: Delia Lawrie

Member of the Northern Territory Legislative Assembly for Arafura
- In office 18 August 2001 – 6 August 2012
- Preceded by: Maurice Rioli
- Succeeded by: Francis Xavier Kurrupuwu

Personal details
- Born: Marion Rose Scrymgour; 13 September 1960 (age 66) Darwin, Northern Territory, Australia
- Party: Labor (Note: Resigned membership in June 2009; rejoined in August of the same year.)
- Other political affiliations: Independent (2009)
- Spouse: David Dalrymple

Marion Rose Scrymgour (born 13 September 1960) is an Australian politician and the current member of parliament (MP) for the federal seat of Lingiari since 2022. She was a member of the Northern Territory Legislative Assembly from 2001 to 2012, representing the electorate of Arafura. She was the Labor Party Deputy Chief Minister of the Northern Territory from November 2007 until February 2009, and was the highest-ranked Indigenous Australian woman in government in Australia's history, as well as the first Indigenous deputy leader of an Australian government. She was also the first Indigenous woman to be elected to the Northern Territory legislature.

Scrymgour, a senior minister under former Chief Minister Clare Martin, had a rapid rise within the party throughout the 2000s, and despite a reputation for outspoken views on Indigenous issues, rose to become Deputy Chief Minister under Paul Henderson after the retirement of long-time deputy Syd Stirling in 2007. She had a controversial term as Education Minister under Henderson, and was shifted to the Attorney-General portfolio in February 2009, in a move widely seen as a demotion. Several days later, she resigned from Cabinet and as Deputy Chief Minister, citing "health reasons". Scrymgour remained on the Labor backbench until June 2009, when she resigned from the Labor Party over its stance on remote Indigenous communities. She sat in the Legislative Assembly as an independent, and held the balance of power; Labor had held only a one-seat majority before her departure. On 4 August 2009, Scrymgour rejoined the ALP.

== Early life and education ==
Scrymgour was born on 13 September 1960 in Darwin, the capital of the Northern Territory. She is the daughter of Claire (née Mollomini) and Jack Scrymgour. Her mother was a Tiwi Islander, and her father had been forcibly removed as a child from his home in Central Australia.

Scrymgour attended primary and secondary school in Darwin, but initially decided against tertiary education, working in several office administration positions. She later undertook correspondence courses as a mature age student in book-keeping, accounting, administration and health economics.

She subsequently served as director of the Wurli Wurlinjang Aboriginal Corporation, co-ordinated several trial community care programs around Katherine, and as Director of the Katherine West Health Board Aboriginal Corporation. Scrymgour was also an active member of the Liquor, Hospitality and Miscellaneous Union, and had represented the union at the national conference of the Australian Labor Party.

== Northern Territory political career ==
=== Early career ===
Northern Territory Legislative Assembly
Years	Term	Electoral division	Party
2001–2005	9th	Arafura	Labor
2005–2008	10th	Arafura	Labor
2008–2012	11th	Arafura	Labor
2009	Changed allegiance to:		Independent
2009–2012	Changed allegiance to:		Labor

Scrymgour contested and won Labor preselection for the Legislative Assembly seat of Arafura, after the retirement of Maurice Rioli. The seat was considered safe for Labor, and she was re-elected with a lesser majority, due to the presence of two high-profile independent candidates on the ballot. In winning the seat, she became the first Indigenous women to be elected to the Legislative Assembly.

Scrymgour was promoted to the ministry under Clare Martin on 17 December 2003, as part of a reshuffle caused by the sacking of Health Minister Jane Aagaard. She was assigned the portfolios of Family and Community Services and Environment and Heritage, and in doing so, became Australia's first Aboriginal woman cabinet minister.

As Minister for Family and Community Services, Scrymgour was tasked with responding to the issues of substance abuse and domestic violence. She chaired a select committee into substance abuse, and was the relevant minister during the roll-out of non-sniffable Opal fuel across remote Indigenous communities. She was shifted to a new portfolio after the 2005 election, being appointed Minister for Natural Resources, Environment and the Arts. After a further reshuffle in August 2007, she retained Arts and Museums, regained Family and Community Services and was made Minister for Child Protection. She also oversaw planned changes to the territory's heritage laws, which created a heritage council to protect important sites, as already exists in several states.

Scrymgour developed a reputation for outspoken views on Indigenous issues during her second term. She clashed with her own party on the issue of the MacArthur River Mine in 2006, and joined three other Indigenous MPs in crossing the floor to oppose the mine's expansion. She made national news in late 2007 when she publicly condemned the federal government's intervention into Indigenous communities, the Northern Territory National Emergency Response, labelling it "a vicious new McCarthyism."

=== Deputy Chief Minister to Independent ===
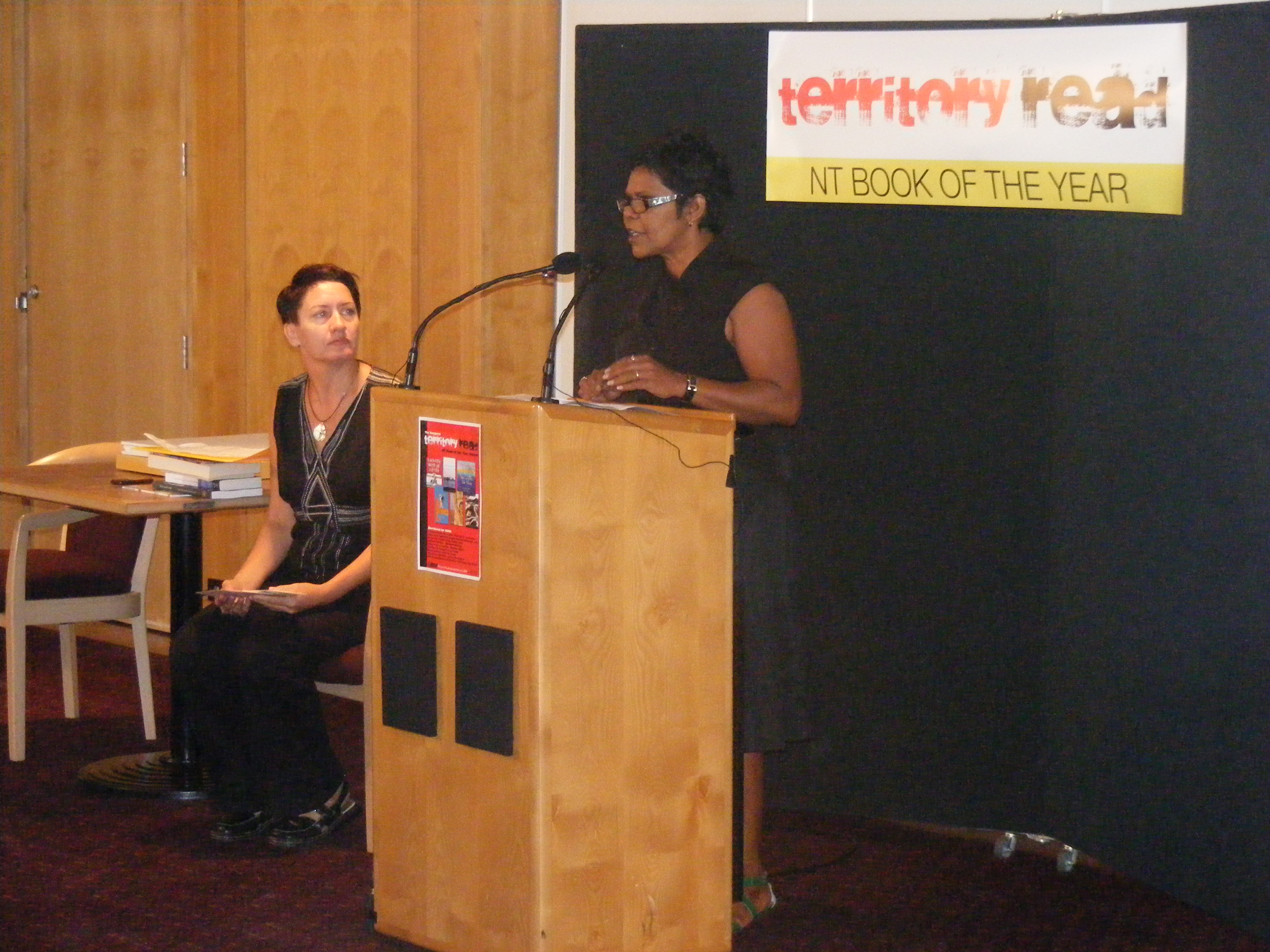
Scrymgour in 2009

Chief Minister Clare Martin resigned in November 2007 after having lost the support of her caucus, and was replaced by Paul Henderson. The newly elected Henderson appointed Scrymgour as his deputy, which was considered a surprise choice at the time. On 24 December 2007 Scrymgour spent several hours at the emergency department of Royal Darwin Hospital undergoing treatment for "an emotional and physical collapse". In January 2008 Scrymgour was appointed Acting Chief Minister of the Northern Territory while the incumbent Paul Henderson was on holiday, becoming the first Aboriginal government leader in Australian history. She served for two weeks.

Scrymgour had taken on the education portfolio upon her ascension to Deputy Chief Minister, but had been regularly criticised in the press for her performance, particularly after her controversial sacking of the head of the territory's Education Department in 2008. This culminated in Henderson's decision in February 2009 to remove Scrymgour from the portfolio, shifting her to the less politically difficult Attorney-General role. The following week, Scrymgour resigned from Cabinet and as Deputy Chief Minister, citing recurring problems with depression caused by the death of her father.

On 1 June 2009, Scrymgour publicly opposed the Government on its announced policy of concentrating Indigenous development in 20 larger communities and discouraging "homeland" or "outstation" settlement, which she labelled as insulting. She said that she realised while recovering from surgery that she had lost touch with her constituents, and that "I feel strongly because we have lied to Aboriginal people". On 4 June, after a significant degree of speculation in the media, she resigned from the Labor Party, reducing it to minority government.

On 4 August 2009, after the defection of another minister, Alison Anderson, Scrymgour announced that she would rejoin the Labor Party.

== Other roles and activities ==
After working for the Australian Red Cross in 2013–2014, Scrymgour returned to Wurli Wurlinjang Aboriginal Corporation as its CEO. In December 2013 she was elected as Chairperson of the Aboriginal Medical Services Alliance Northern Territory.

In November 2013, Scrymgour was awarded an honorary doctorate in Health Sciences by the University of Sydney, the first Aboriginal recipient of such an honour from the Faculty of Health Sciences.

In March 2019, Scrymgour was appointed CEO of the Northern Land Council and became the first woman CEO of any land council in the Northern Territory.

== Federal politics ==
In March 2021, Scrymgour was preselected as the Labor candidate for the federal seat of Lingiari in the 2022 federal election after Labor incumbent Warren Snowdon announced he would not stand for re-election. She won the seat by a narrow margin from Country Liberal candidate Damien Ryan.

Following the re-election of the Labor government in the 2025 Australian federal election, Scrymgour was named Special Envoy for Remote Communities in the second Albanese ministry.

== See also ==
- List of Indigenous Australian politicians

== Notes ==
Parliament of Australia
Preceded by Warren Snowdon	Member for Lingiari; 2022–present	Incumbent
Political offices
Preceded by Syd Stirling	Deputy Chief Minister of the Northern Territory; 2007–2009	Succeeded by Delia Lawrie
Northern Territory Legislative Assembly
Preceded by Maurice Rioli	Member for Arafura; 2001–2012	Succeeded by Francis Xavier Kurrupuwu
