= Carol Martin (politician) =

Australian politician

Carol Martin OAM

Member of the Legislative Assembly of Western Australia
- In office 10 February 2001 – 9 March 2013
- Preceded by: Ernie Bridge
- Succeeded by: Josie Farrer
- Constituency: Kimberley

Personal details
- Born: Carol Anne Pilkington; 13 October 1957 (age 68) Subiaco, Western Australia, Australia
- Party: Labor
- Spouse: Brian Martin
- Education: Curtin University
- Profession: Social worker, politician and artist
- Cultural background: Yamatji – Noongar

Carol Anne Martin OAM (née Pilkington; born 13 October 1957) is a former Australian politician who served as a Labor Party member of the Legislative Assembly of Western Australia between 2001 and 2013, representing the seat of Kimberley. She was the first Aboriginal woman to be elected to any Australian parliament.

== Background and early career ==
Born as Carol Anne Pilkington in Subiaco, Perth, Western Australia, Martin grew up in Perth, Carnarvon and Mukinbudin. Her mother, Rose Pilkington, was a Yamatji, while her father Bernard was Noongar, and she had six siblings. Her father taught her car maintenance, traditional painting in his people's style, singing and hunting.

At the age of 12, she was removed from her family and became a ward of the state, moving across several foster homes. Pat Dodson, a Yawuru elder, later wrote: "Removal had a profound impact on her. Albeit a painful and lonely time in her life, it was a period that required her to develop the constructive skills necessary to deal with her extraction and isolation." At age 15, she made the decision to follow her mother to Broome after her parents' divorce, and the local community protected her from the authorities. She completed a Business Management course in spite of not having completed formal schooling. In 1982, she moved to Derby, where she worked as a social worker and counsellor, and in 1984 married Brian Martin. Amongst other things, she worked alongside others to help return Aboriginal children who were missing in the system to their families, and help Aboriginal families deal with the consequences of the Stolen Generations. She said in 2001, "Sometimes I could help, other times my heart went out to them — for many of them their children are still lost."

In 1992, Martin won a scholarship to study a Bachelor of Arts in Social Work at Curtin University. Her husband and two young children moved to Perth to be with her. She was the first in her family to graduate from university.

== Political career ==
Martin served on the Derby-West Kimberley Shire Council, and was a member of the National Association for Loss and Grief in Western Australia, the Industry Training Advisory Board, and the Support Committee for Young Women's Health Wise. Her husband Brian was the president of the Derby branch of the Labor Party, and ran as an independent candidate at the 1996 state election against incumbent ex-Labor MLA Ernie Bridge.

Following Bridge's retirement from politics at the 2001 state election, Martin secured Labor preselection for the seat of Kimberley, and won it easily. In doing so she became the first ever Aboriginal woman elected to an Australian parliament. Martin was responsible for the establishment of EMILY's List's Partnership for Equity Network, which is aimed at involving more Indigenous women in public life.

After three full terms, Martin retired from politics in 2013, in part following racial slurs directed at her in response to her support for Woodside Petroleum's plans to build a liquefied natural hub near Broome, but also a desire to spend more time in the Kimberley and with her family. She was succeeded in the seat by Gitja woman Josie Farrer.

In January 2016, she was named as the Labor Party's candidate for the federal seat of Durack, which covers the northern part of the state.

== Personal life and honours ==
Martin is also an accomplished painter and artist, having taken it up on her return to Derby in the 1990s. Her work has been exhibited by Curtin University and still resides in the Centre for Aboriginal Studies, and former Governor-General William Deane owned several paintings. She has assisted with the creation of the Australian Indigenous Art and Culture Development Fund, which attempts to right a past wrong where traditional Aboriginal artists were not given royalty payments for the use of their work, and has been a strong supporter of the Indigenous Stock Exchange (ISX) which was founded in May 2003.

Her interests include fishing, camping, reading and spending time with her large extended family. She has two children and several grandchildren.

Martin was inducted onto the Victorian Honour Roll of Women in 2001. She was awarded the Medal of the Order of Australia in the 2023 King's Birthday Honours for "service to the Parliament of Western Australia, and to the Indigenous community".

Western Australian Legislative Assembly
Preceded by Ernie Bridge	Member for Kimberley; 2001–2013	Succeeded by Josie Farrer
