= Divina D'Anna =

Australian politician

Divina D'Anna MLA

Member of the Western Australian Legislative Assembly for Kimberley
- Incumbent
- Assumed office 13 March 2021
- Preceded by: Josie Farrer

Personal details
- Born: 5 December 1976 (age 49) Broome, Western Australia
- Party: Labor
- Website: www.divinadanna.com.au

Divina Grace D'Anna (born 5 December 1976) is an Australian politician. She has been a Labor member of the Western Australian Legislative Assembly since the 2021 state election, representing Kimberley.

A Yawuru, Nimanburr and Bardi woman, D'Anna was born and grew up in Broome, Western Australia.

In August 2020 she was selected to replace the retiring sitting member, Josie Farrer. In her election campaign D'Anna received mentoring from Senator Malarndirri McCarthy through EMILY's List Australia.

D'Anna was re-elected in the 2025 Western Australian state election.

Western Australian Legislative Assembly
Preceded by Josie Farrer	Member for Kimberley; 2021–present	Incumbent
