= Stan Tipiloura =

Australian politician

Member of the Northern Territory Parliament for Arafura
- In office 7 March 1987 – 20 September 1992
- Preceded by: Bob Collins
- Succeeded by: Maurice Rioli

Personal details
- Born: Stanley Gabriel Tipiloura; 2 September 1957 Bathurst Island
- Died: 20 September 1992 (aged 35) Melbourne, Victoria
- Cause of death: Kidney failure
- Party: Labor Party
- Education: St John's College, Darwin; Monivae College, Hamilton, Victoria

Stanley Gabriel Tipiloura (2 September 1957 – 20 September 1992) was an Australian politician. He was the Labor member for Arafura in the Northern Territory Legislative Assembly from 1987 until his death in 1992.

== Background and early career ==
Tipiloura was born on Bathurst Island. He attended primary school there, before studying for two years at St John's College, Darwin and two years at Monivae College in Victoria. He worked for the CSIRO in Darwin after leaving school, and was a successful amateur footballer with St Mary's Football Club; he also played a stint for South Adelaide Football Club in South Australia in the late 1970s. He returned to Bathurst Island in 1975, where he worked in various roles, including for the Nguiu Council, of which he would subsequently be elected president. He returned to Nguiu permanently in 1980, where served as a police aide and then officer at Nguiu from 1980 to 1985. At the time of his election to parliament, he was also the president of the newly elected local branch of the Labor Party.

== Political career ==
Northern Territory Legislative Assembly
| Years | Term | Electoral division | Party |
|---|---|---|---|
| 1987–1990 | 5th | Arafura | Labor |
| 1990–1992 | 6th | Arafura | Labor |

He was elected to the Legislative Assembly for Arafura at the 1987 election, succeeding his brother-in-law and former Labor leader Bob Collins, who was contesting a seat in the Australian Senate. Tipiloura's election made him, at the time, one of the parliament's only Aboriginal members. Upon his election, he was appointed shadow minister for local government, administrative services, libraries, conservation, museums, and police, fire and emergency services.

In recognition of his accomplishments and career promise, in 1988 he was selected to travel to the United States with young political leaders from other countries to study the U.S. national elections in November of that year. Organized by the American Council of Young Political Leaders, Tipiloura was a vital member of the group that traveled the breadth of the State of Michigan studying both voters and political campaign methods. Just before election day, all groups traveled to Washington, D.C. for series of presentations from leaders such as U.S. National Security Advisor Colin Powell, who would later become U.S. Secretary of State. Tipiloura maintained his international outreach, sending Christmas cards to his new colleagues in 1988.

He contracted kidney failure shortly after his election, and spent some time on dialysis before his uncle donated a kidney in 1990. He was re-elected at the 1990 election from his hospital bed, and was made shadow minister for Aboriginal affairs after the election. However, the disease did not rescind and he died in Melbourne in 1992, aged 35. Tipiloura was the first serving member of the Northern Territory Parliament to die.

Northern Territory Legislative Assembly
| Preceded by Bob Collins | Member for Arafura; 1987–1992 | Succeeded by Maurice Rioli |
