= Francis Xavier Kurrupuwu =

Australian politician

Councillor of the Tiwi Islands Region for Bathurst Island
- Incumbent
- Assumed office 28 August 2021

Member of the Northern Territory Legislative Assembly for Arafura
- In office 25 August 2012 – 27 August 2016
- Preceded by: Marion Scrymgour
- Succeeded by: Lawrence Costa

Personal details
- Born: Maralampuwi Kurrupuwu; 10 June 1961 (age 65) Nguiu, Tiwi Islands, Northern Territory, Australia
- Party: Country Liberal (2012–2014; 2014-present)
- Other political affiliations: Independent (2014); Palmer United (2014)
- Spouse: Ancilla Kurrupuwu
- Occupation: Teacher

Francis Xavier Kurrupuwu (born 10 June 1961), also known as Maralampuwi Kurrupuwu (Aboriginal pronunciation: [maralambuwi ɡurubuwu]), is an Australian politician. He was a member of the Northern Territory Legislative Assembly from 2012 to 2016. He was originally elected for the Country Liberal Party (CLP), but quit the party in April 2014 to sit as an independent. He briefly joined the Palmer United Party (PUP) before returning to the CLP in September 2014.

Northern Territory Legislative Assembly
Years	Term	Electoral division	Party
2012–2014	12th	Arafura	Country Liberal
2014	Changed allegiance to:		Independent
2014	Changed allegiance to:		Palmer United
2014–2016	Changed allegiance to:		Country Liberal

Kurrupuwu was born in Nguiu on Bathurst Island, the smaller of the two main Tiwi Islands. He was named Francis Xavier by Sister Anne Gardiner, after Bishop Francis Xavier Gsell, who had established a Catholic mission on the island in 1911. A staunch Catholic, he has worked with the Church for over thirty years, and is also manager of the Australian Red Cross on the islands. He has also held many local government roles, including President and Deputy Chair of the Nguiu Community Council, a member on the ATSIC regional council, Deputy Chair of the Tiwi Land Council and a councillor in the Tiwi Islands Shire.

Kurrupuwu once stood for Labor preselection, but switched sides to the Country Liberals after losing faith in progressive politics, in particular what he called Labor's "condescending" policies towards Aboriginal people. At the 2012 general election, he defeated former AFL footballer Dean Rioli who was the Labor candidate for Arafura—both men are related to former member and footballer Maurice Rioli.

In April 2014, Kurrupuwu was one of three Indigenous MPs, alongside Alison Anderson and Larisa Lee, who resigned from the Country Liberal Party and sat as independents. The three MPs joined Palmer United later that month, with Anderson becoming the party's parliamentary leader. In September 2014, Kurrupuwu resigned from PUP and re-joined the Country Liberal Party.

Northern Territory Legislative Assembly
Preceded by Marion Scrymgour	Member for Arafura; 2012–2016	Succeeded by Lawrence Costa
