= Josie Farrer =

Australian politician

Member of the Western Australian Legislative Assembly for Kimberley
- In office 9 March 2013 – 29 January 2021
- Preceded by: Carol Martin
- Succeeded by: Divina D'Anna

Personal details
- Born: 24 September 1947 (age 78) Halls Creek, Western Australia, Australia
- Party: Labor

Josephine Farrer (born 24 September 1947) is an Australian politician who was a Labor Party member of the Legislative Assembly of Western Australia from 2013 to 2021, representing the seat of Kimberley.

Farrer was born on Moola Bulla Station, but her family were forcibly relocated to the nearby town of Halls Creek when she was a child. A member of the Kija people of the East Kimberley, she was raised with Kija (or Gidja) as her first language, and later learned Kriol and English. Prior to being elected to parliament, Farrer served on the Halls Creek Shire Council for sixteen years, including as shire president for seven years. She also served on the board of the Kimberley Land Council.

In June 2012, Farrer was preselected as the Labor candidate for the seat of Kimberley at the 2013 state election, replacing the retiring Carol Martin. She recorded only 26.7 percent on first preferences, but went on to win the seat with 55.1 percent of the two-party-preferred vote. Farrer retained her seat at the 2017 state election, recording a 7.9% two-party preferred swing towards her and restoring the seat to its safe status. In August 2020, Farrer announced she was retiring from parliament and would not contest the 2021 state election.

Western Australian Legislative Assembly
Preceded by Carol Martin	Member for Kimberley; 2013–2021	Succeeded by Divina D'Anna
