= Manuel Brown =

Australian politician

Manuel Brown MLA

Member of the Northern Territory Legislative Assembly for Arafura
- Incumbent
- Assumed office 18 March 2023
- Preceded by: Lawrence Costa

Personal details
- Party: Labor Party

Manuel Brown is an Australian politician. He has been the Labor member of the Northern Territory Legislative Assembly since a 2023 election, representing the electorate of Arafura. Like his predecessor Lawrence Costa he is of Tiwi descent.

In 2009, he was convicted of driving without due care after a woman was killed following a vehicle collision in Katherine.

Northern Territory Legislative Assembly
Preceded by Lawrence Costa	Member for Arafura; 2023–present	Incumbent
