= Lawrence Costa =

Australian politician (1969/1970–2022)

Member of the Northern Territory Legislative Assembly for Arafura
- In office 27 August 2016 – 17 December 2022
- Preceded by: Francis Xavier Kurrupuwu
- Succeeded by: Manuel Brown

Personal details
- Born: 27 November 1970 Melville Island, Northern Territory, Australia
- Died: 17 December 2022 (aged 52)
- Party: Labor Party

Lawrence Costa (27 November 1970 – 17 December 2022) was an Australian politician. He was a Labor member of the Northern Territory Legislative Assembly from 2016 until his death in 2022, representing the electorate of Arafura. He was of Tiwi descent.

== Early life and career ==
Costa lived on his homeland Pitjarmirra north of Melville Island.

Costa worked for the Pirlangimpi Community Government Council running the then CDEP Program from 1996 to 2002. He was elected on Jabiru Regional Council as the deputy chairman. He was then elected chairperson of North West Regional Council from 2002 to 2005. He then became CEO of Tiwi Islands Local Government in 2008. After the amalgamations of the shires he became director of Community Development with Tiwi Islands Shire Council until 2013. Before entering politics, Costa worked as a health service development officer for the Department of Health.

== Politics ==
Northern Territory Legislative Assembly
Years	Term	Electoral division	Party
2016–2020	13th	Arafura	Labor
2020–2022	14th	Arafura	Labor

Costa was elected into the Northern Territory Legislative Assembly in 2016 for the Labor Party in the electoral division of Arafura, defeating Francis Xavier Kurrupuwu.

== Personal life and death ==
Costa died suddenly on 17 December 2022, at the age of 52. He was succeeded by Manuel Brown in the 2023 Arafura by-election.

Northern Territory Legislative Assembly
Preceded by Francis Xavier Kurrupuwu	Member for Arafura; 2016–2022	Succeeded by Manuel Brown
