= Electoral division of Arafura =

Coordinates: 12°40′S 132°50′E

Arafura Northern Territory—Legislative Assembly
- Interactive map of boundaries as of the 2024 election
- Territory: Northern Territory
- Created: 1983
- MP: Manuel Brown
- Party: Labor
- Namesake: Arafura Sea
- Electors: 6,212 (2026)
- Area: 57,410 km^{2} (22,166.1 sq mi)
- Demographic: Remote
Electorates around Arafura:
Timor Sea	Timor Sea	Timor Sea
Goyder	Arafura	Mulka
Daly	Arnhem	Barkly

Arafura is an electoral division of the Legislative Assembly in Australia's Northern Territory. It was first created in 1983, and takes its name from the Arafura Sea, which adjoins the electorate. The electorate is predominantly rural, encompassing 57,410 square kilometres (22,170 square miles) in western Arnhem Land and the Tiwi Islands, and including the towns of Gunbalanya, Jabiru, Maningrida, Milikapiti and Nguiu. There were 6,212 people enrolled in the electorate as of July 2026.

== History ==
Arafura was a safe seat for the Labor Party for most of its history. Its first MLA was Labor leader Bob Collins, who transferred to the seat from Arnhem upon the expansion of the Assembly in 1983. Collins retired 4 years later and was replaced by Stan Tipiloura. Tipiloura died of kidney failure in 1992, and was succeeded by former Australian rules footballer Maurice Rioli. Rioli retired at the 2001 election and was in turn succeeded by Marion Scrymgour. Scrymgour briefly left the Labor party in 2009 after being sacked as a minister, and retired at the 2012 election.

At that election, the CLP picked up a large and unprecedented swing in remote seats, which had traditionally been safe for Labor. Arafura was no exception, with CLP candidate Francis Xavier Kurrupuwu winning the seat on a 15 per cent swing. Kurrupuwu briefly left his party along with two other Indigenous CLP MLAs in 2014. Lawrence Costa regained the seat for Labor in 2016 as part of his party's landslide victory that year. The electorate has a particularly high Indigenous population, which has been reflected in its having been represented by five consecutive Indigenous MPs.

== Members for Arafura ==
Member	Party	Term
Bob Collins	Labor	1983–1987
Stan Tipiloura	Labor	1987–1992
Maurice Rioli	Labor	1992–2001
Marion Scrymgour	Labor	2001–2009
Marion Scrymgour	Independent	2009
Marion Scrymgour	Labor	2009–2012
Francis Xavier Kurrupuwu	Country Liberal	2012–2014
Francis Xavier Kurrupuwu	Independent	2014
Francis Xavier Kurrupuwu	Palmer United	2014
Francis Xavier Kurrupuwu	Country Liberal	2014–2016
Lawrence Costa	Labor	2016–2022
Manuel Brown	Labor	2023–present

== Election results ==
2024 Northern Territory general election: Arafura
Party	Candidate	Votes	%	±%
Labor	Manuel Brown	1,887	69.7	+20.7
Country Liberal	Yanja Thompson	821	30.3	−9.8
Total formal votes		2,708	97.9	+3.1
Informal votes		57	2.1	−3.1
Turnout		2,765	44.6	−8.1
Labor hold		Swing	+16.1	
