= Darwin, Northern Territory =

Capital city of Northern Territory, Australia

Darwin Garramilla (Laragia)
- City
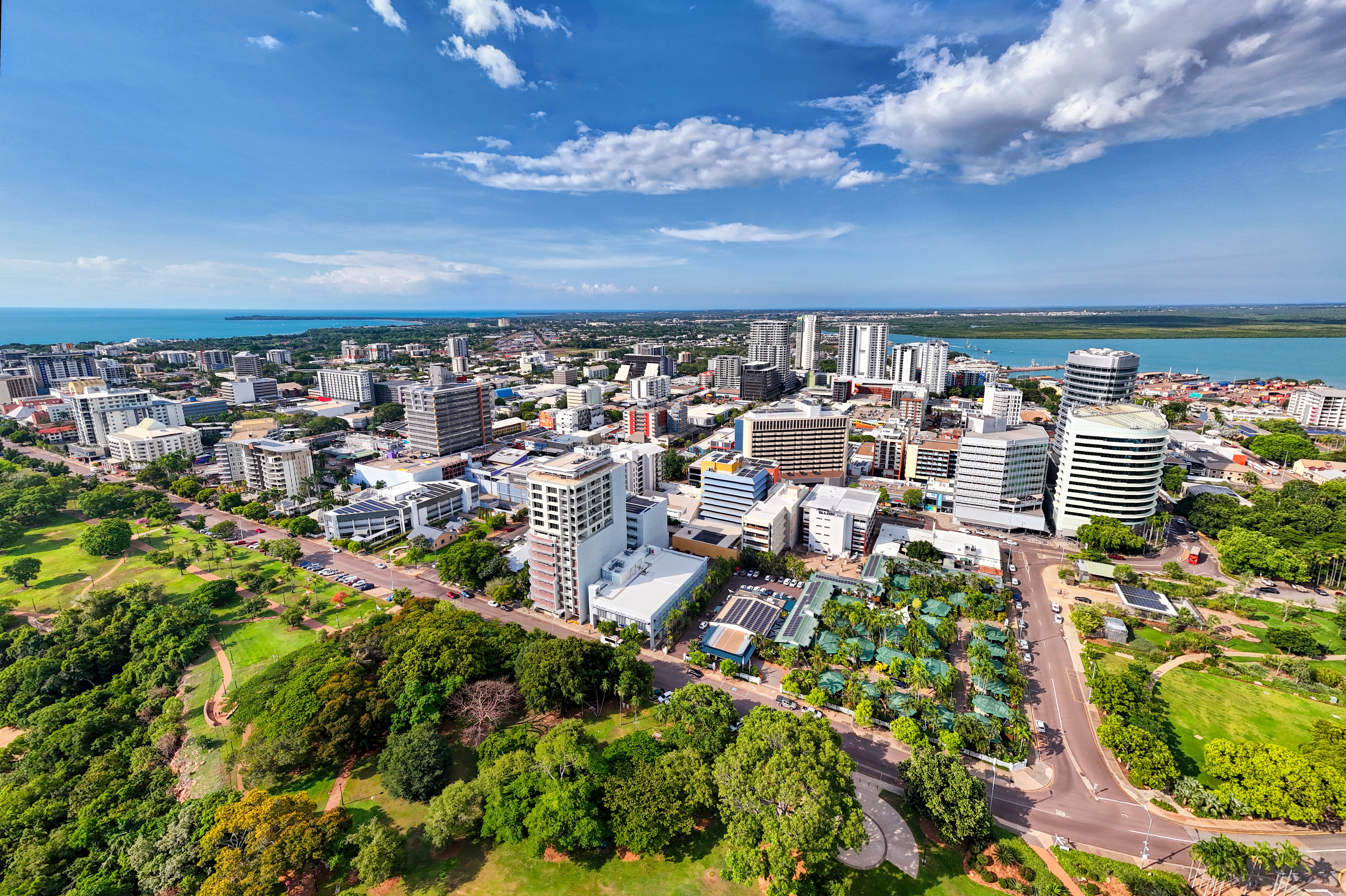
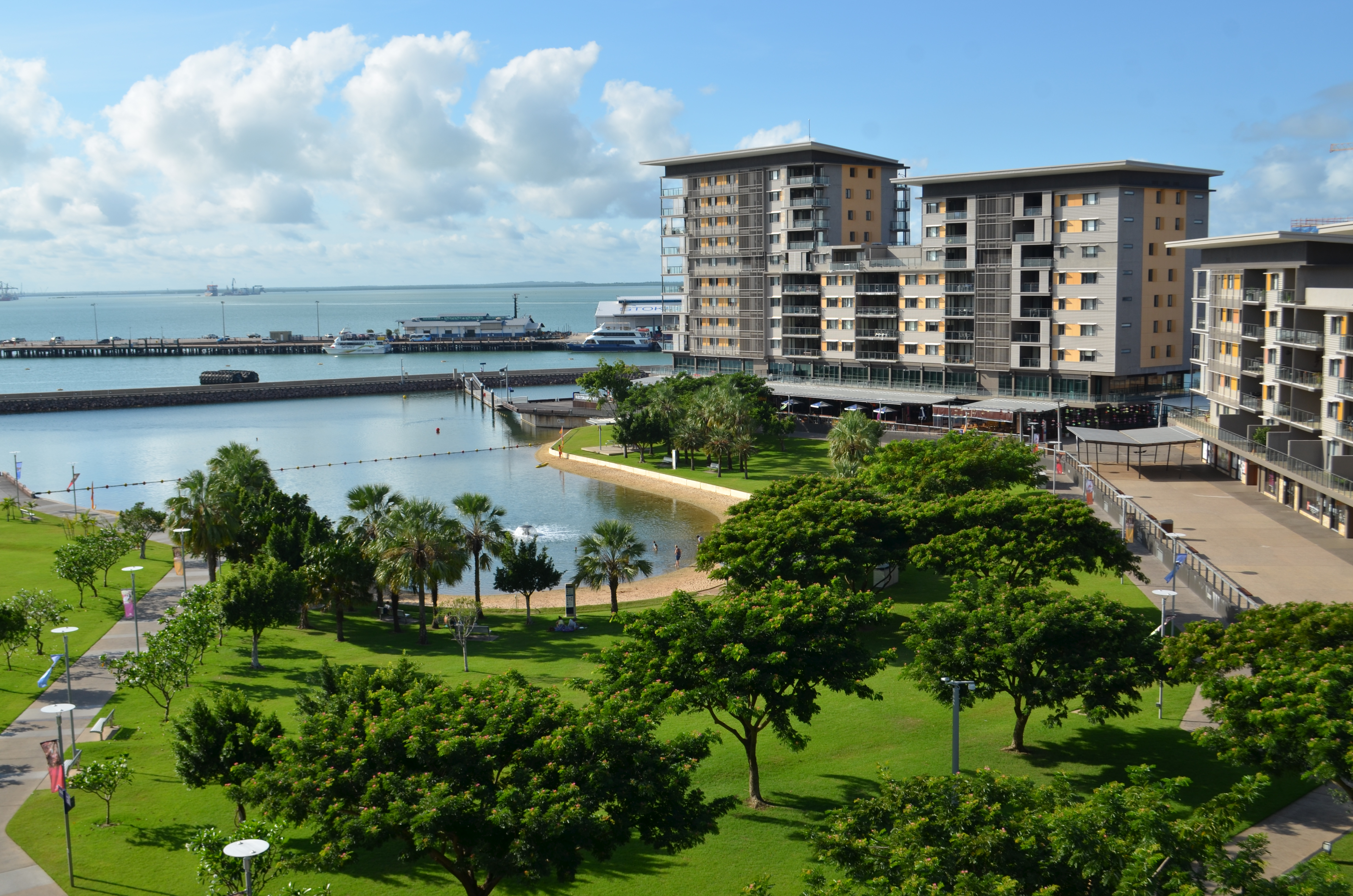
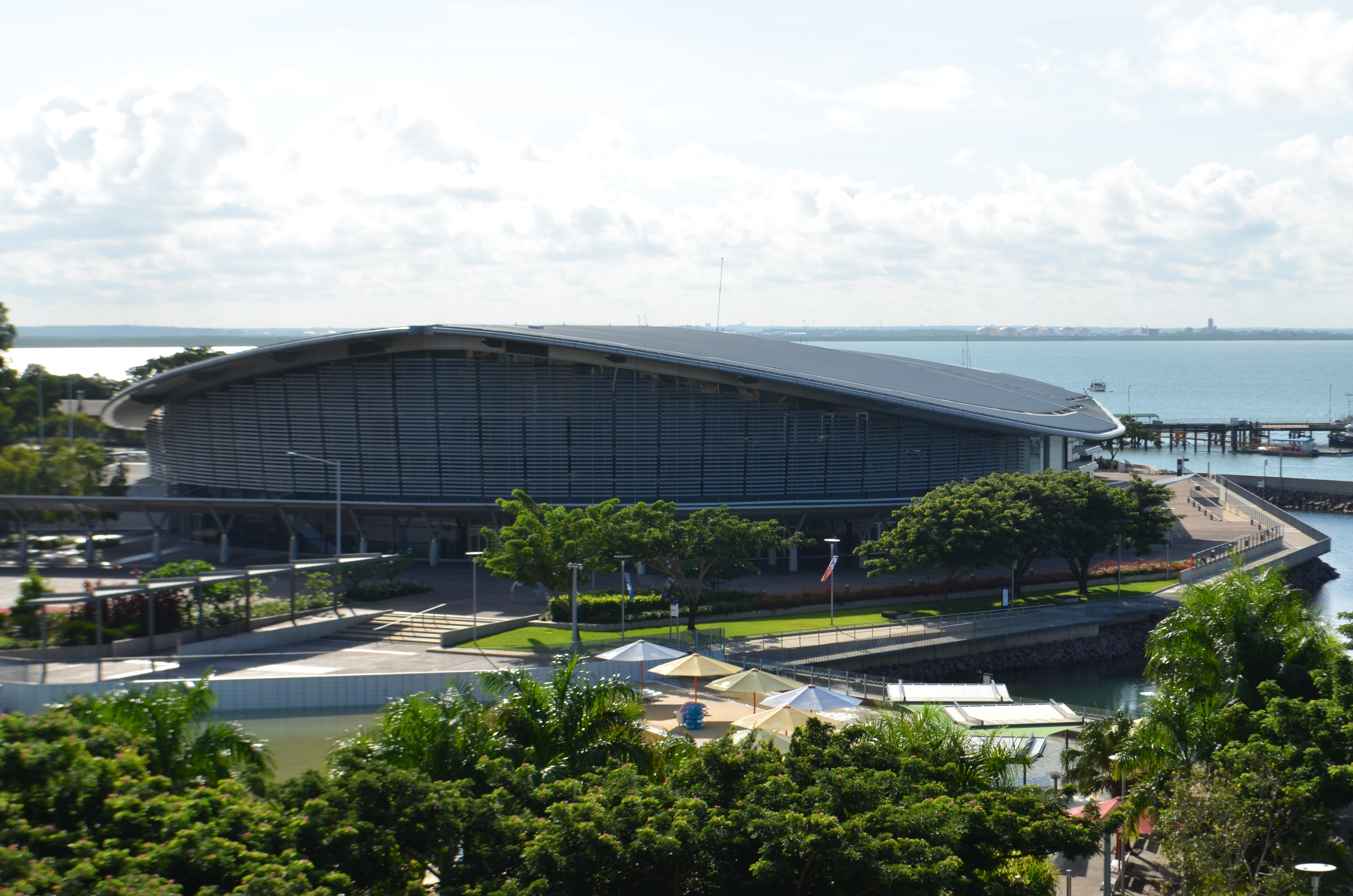
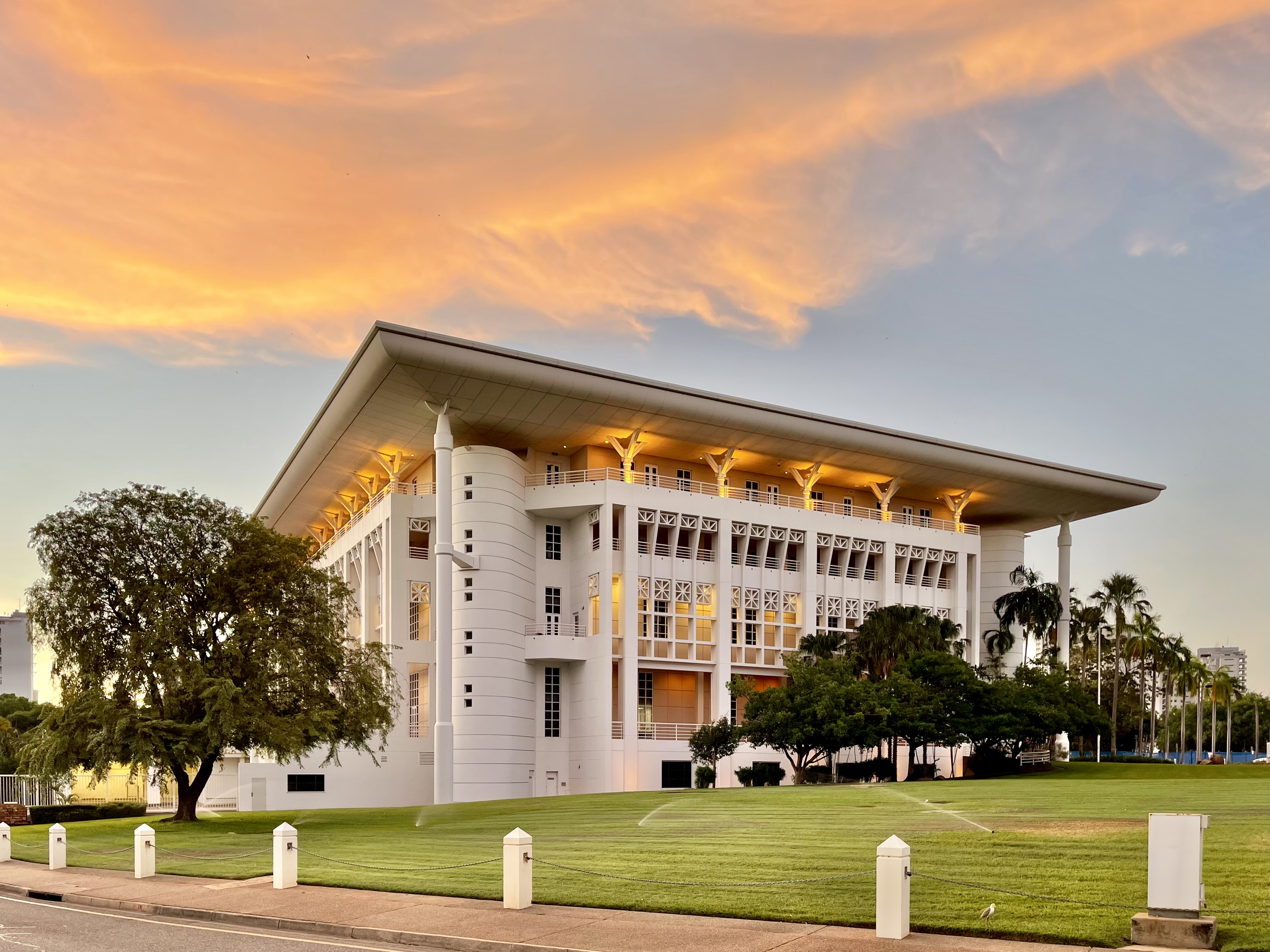
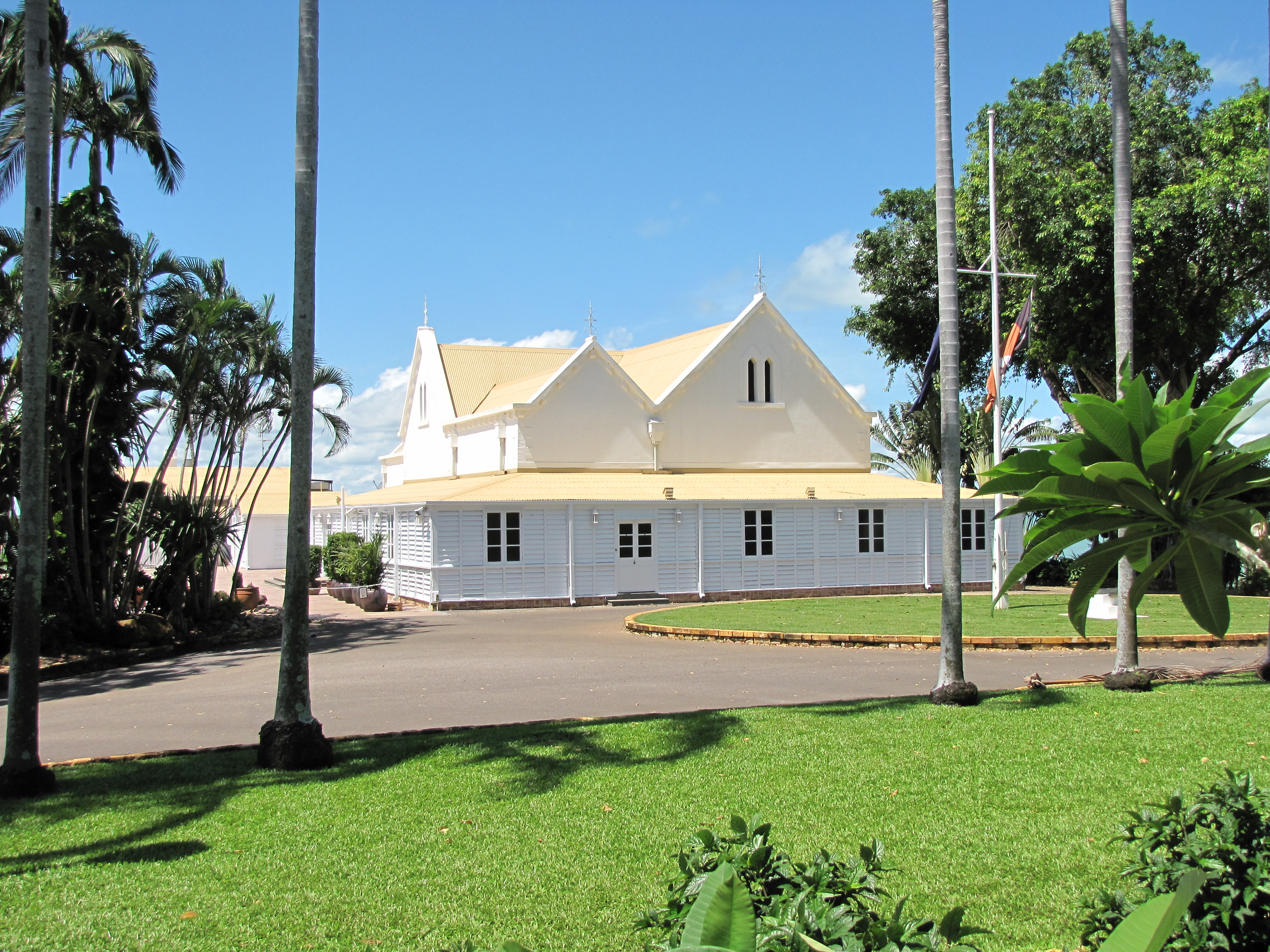
- Darwin central business district Darwin Waterfront Convention Centre Parliament House Government House

- Interactive map of Darwin
- Coordinates: 12°26′17″S 130°50′28″E
- Country: Australia
- State: Northern Territory
- LGA: Darwin, Palmerston, Litchfield
- Location: 1,679 km (1,043 mi) from Cairns; 2,616 km (1,626 mi) from Adelaide; 2,652 km (1,648 mi) from Perth; 2,846 km (1,768 mi) from Brisbane; 3,127 km (1,943 mi) from Canberra
- Established: 1869

Government
  - Lord Mayor: Peter Styles
  - Territory electorate: Port Darwin (and 14 others)
  - Federal division: Solomon, Lingiari

Area (2011 urban)
  - Total: 3,163.8 km^{2} (1,221.6 sq mi)

Population
  - Total: 139,902 (2021) (17th)
  - Density: 44.2196/km^{2} (114.5283/sq mi)
- Time zone: UTC+9:30 (ACST)
- County: Palmerston County
- Mean max temp: 32.2 °C (90.0 °F)
- Mean min temp: 23.4 °C (74.1 °F)
- Annual rainfall: 1,811.7 mm (71.33 in)

Darwin (/ˈdɑːrwɪn/ DAR-win; Larrakia: Garramilla) is the capital and largest city of the Northern Territory, Australia. The city had a population of 139,902 at the 2021 census, which is nearly 63% of the territory's population. It is the smallest, wettest, and most northerly of the Australian capital cities and serves as the Top End's regional centre.

Darwin's proximity to Southeast Asia makes it a key link between Australia and countries such as Indonesia and Timor-Leste. The Stuart Highway begins in Darwin and extends southwards across central Australia through Tennant Creek and Alice Springs, concluding in Port Augusta, South Australia. The city is built upon a low bluff overlooking Darwin Harbour. Darwin's suburbs extend to Lee Point in the north and to Berrimah in the east. The Stuart Highway extends to Darwin's eastern satellite city of Palmerston and its suburbs.

The Darwin region, like much of the Top End, has a tropical climate, with a wet and dry season. A period known locally as "the build up" leading up to Darwin's wet season sees temperature and humidity increase. Darwin's wet season typically arrives in late November to early December and brings with it heavy monsoonal downpours, spectacular lightning displays, and increased cyclone activity. During the dry season, the city has clear skies and mild sea breezes from the harbour.

The Larrakia people are the traditional owners of the Darwin area, and Aboriginal people are a significant proportion of the population. On 9 September 1839, HMS Beagle sailed into Darwin Harbour during its survey of the area. John Clements Wickham named the region "Port Darwin" in honour of Charles Darwin, who had sailed with them on the ship's previous voyage. The settlement there became the town of Palmerston in 1869, but was renamed Darwin in 1911. Darwin has been almost entirely rebuilt four times, following devastation caused by a cyclone in 1897, another one in 1937, Japanese air raids during World War II, and Cyclone Tracy in 1974.

== History ==
=== Indigenous history ===
The Aboriginal people of the Larrakia language group are the traditional custodians and earliest known inhabitants of the greater Darwin area. Their name for the area is Garramilla, pronounced /ɡɑːrəmɪlə/ and meaning "white stone", referring to the colour of rock and sea cliffs found in the area. They had trading routes with Southeast Asia (see Macassan contact with Australia) and imported goods from as far afield as South and Western Australia. Established songlines penetrated throughout the country, allowing stories and histories to be told and retold along the routes.

=== Pre-20th century ===
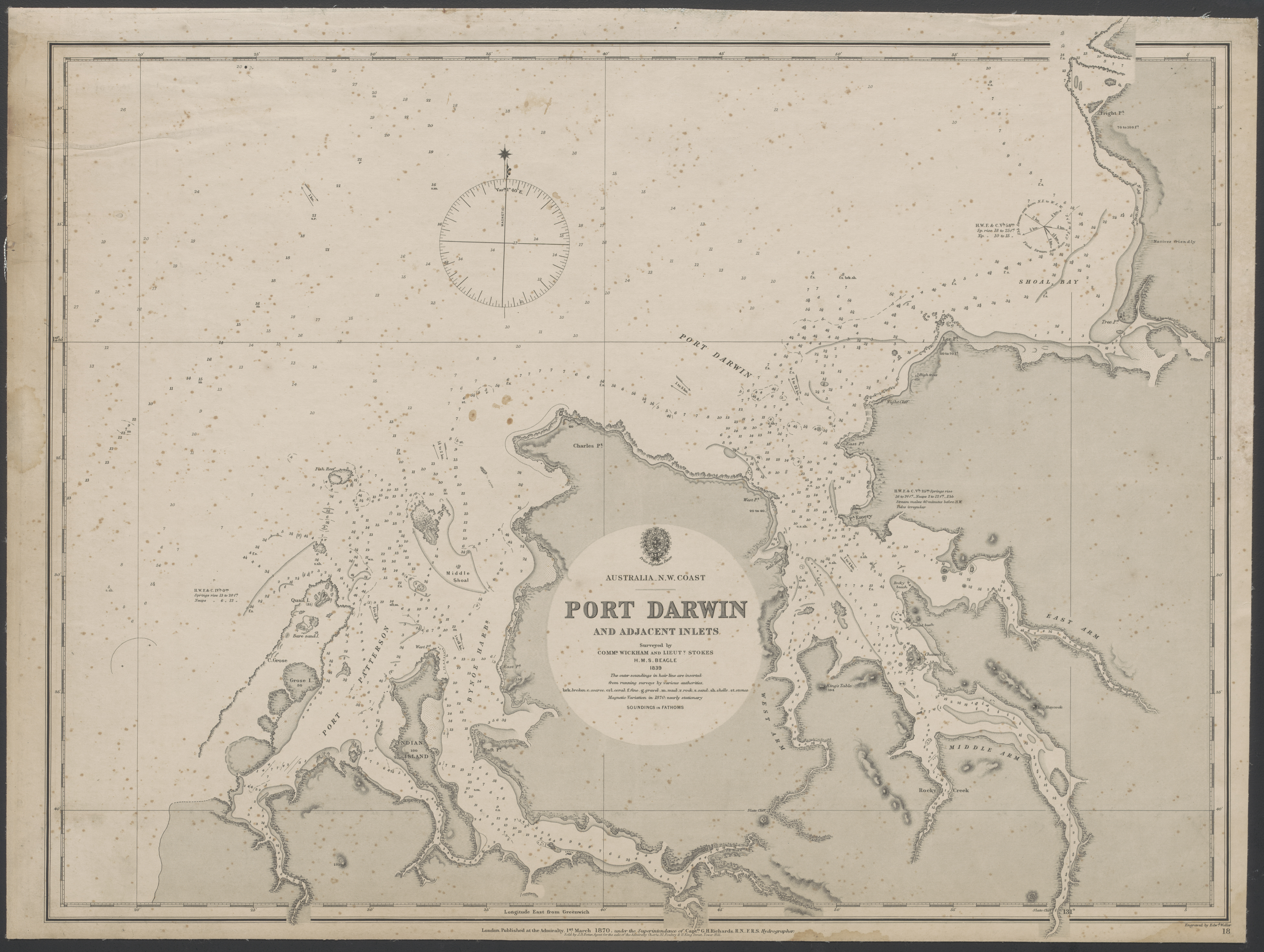
A map of Port Darwin, 1870

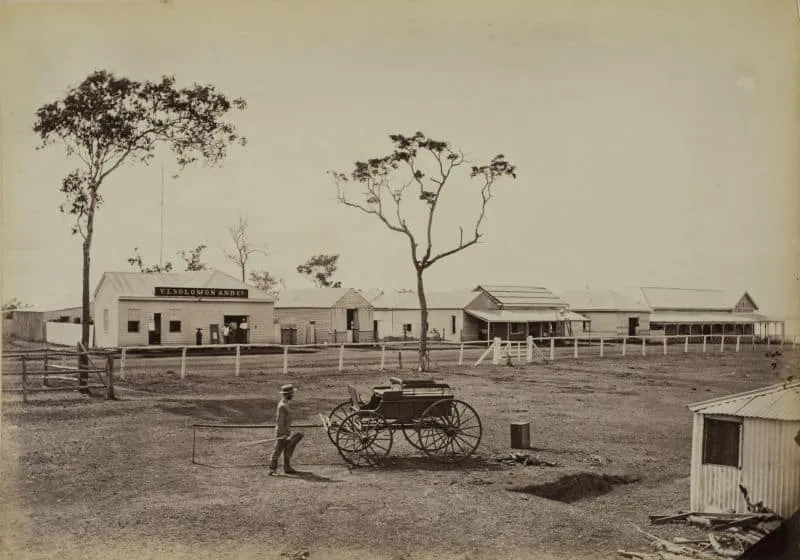
Mitchell Street, 1879

The Dutch visited Australia's northern coastline in the 1600s and landed on the Tiwi Islands only to be attacked by the Tiwi peoples. The Dutch created the first European maps of the area. This accounts for the Dutch names in the area, such as Arnhem Land and Groote Eylandt. During this period, Dutch explorers named the region around Darwin—sometimes including nearby Kimberley—variations of "Van Diemen's Land", after the VOC governor-general Anthony van Diemen. This should not be confused with the more general and prolonged use of the same name for Tasmania.

The first Briton to see Darwin harbour appears to have been Lieutenant John Lort Stokes of HMS Beagle on 9 September 1839. The ship's captain, Commander John Clements Wickham, named the port after Charles Darwin, the British naturalist who had sailed with him when he served as first lieutenant on the earlier second expedition of the Beagle.

In 1863, the Northern Territory was transferred from New South Wales to South Australia. In 1864 South Australia sent B. T. Finniss north as Government Resident to survey and found a capital for its new territory. Finniss chose a site at Escape Cliffs, near the entrance to Adelaide River, about 60 kilometres (37 mi) northeast of the modern city. This attempt was short-lived, and the settlement abandoned by 1865.

On 5 February 1869, George Goyder, the Surveyor-General of South Australia, established a small settlement of 135 people at Port Darwin between Fort Hill and the escarpment. Goyder named the settlement Palmerston after British Prime Minister Lord Palmerston. In 1870, the first poles for the Overland Telegraph were erected in Darwin, connecting Australia to the rest of the world. The discovery of gold by employees of the Australian Overland Telegraph Line digging holes for telegraph poles at Pine Creek in the 1880s spawned a gold rush, which further boosted the colony's development. (Note: The story around the pole holes is commonly perpetuated, though no first hand accounts have been uncovered to authenticate this) (Note: In 1872 it was reported that "A great many statements have been made about gold being found in holes of the telegraph post, and other unimaginable places. Such statements are incorrect, and given out by interested parties.") (Note: The nearest first hand account is of linesmen finding gold near the telegraph line.)

In February 1872 the brigantine Alexandra was the first private vessel to sail from an English port directly to Darwin, carrying people many of whom were coming to recent gold finds.

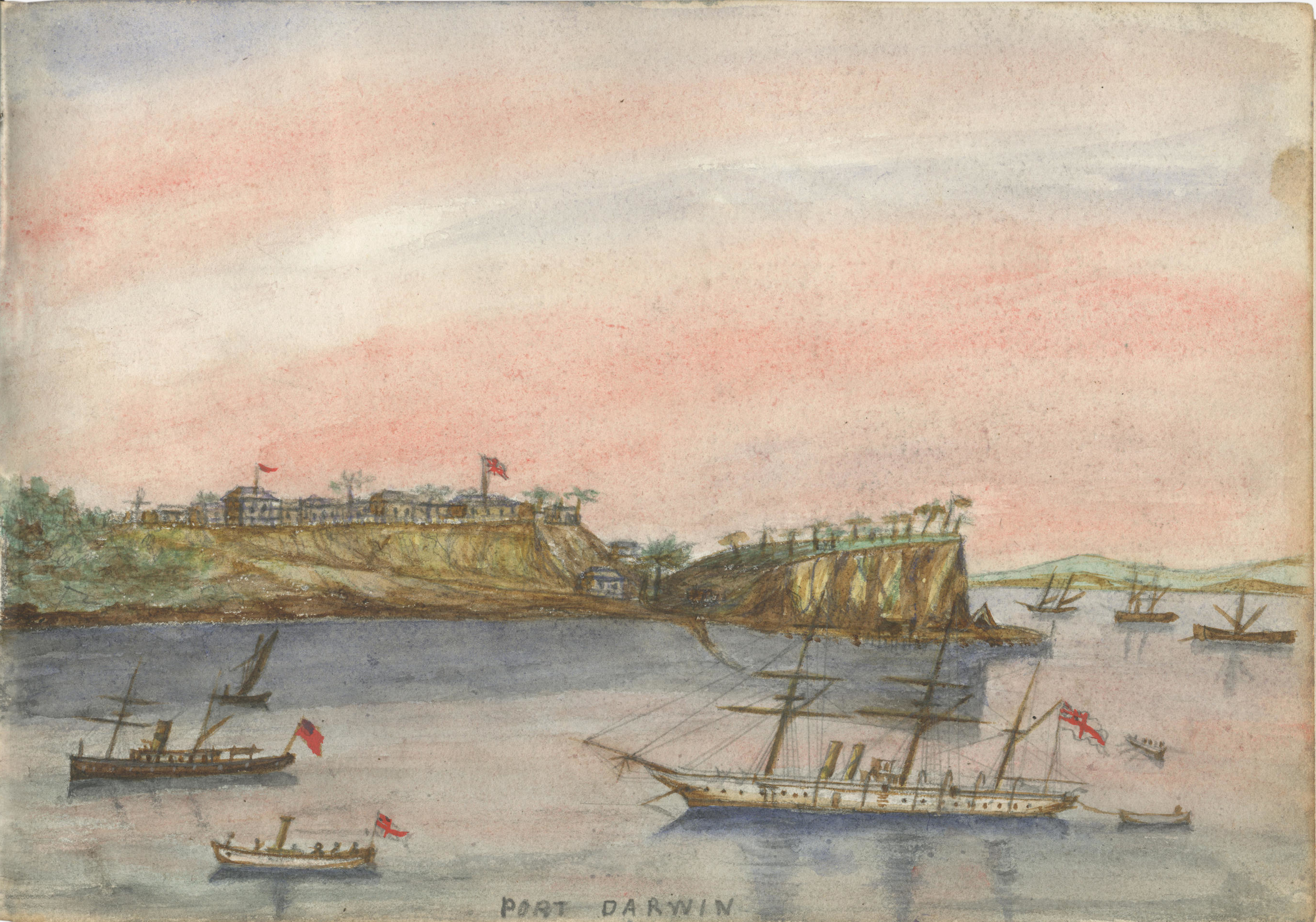
Port Darwin, 1886

In early 1875 Darwin's white population had grown to approximately 300 because of the gold rush. On 17 February 1875 the SS Gothenburg left Darwin en route for Adelaide. The approximately 88 passengers and 34 crew (surviving records vary) included government officials, circuit-court judges, Darwin residents taking their first furlough, and miners. While travelling south along the north Queensland coast, the Gothenburg encountered a cyclone-strength storm and was wrecked on a section of the Great Barrier Reef. Only 22 men survived, while between 98 and 112 people perished. Many passengers who perished were Darwin residents, and news of the tragedy severely affected the small community, which reportedly took several years to recover.

In the 1870s, relatively large numbers of Chinese settled at least temporarily in the Northern Territory; many were contracted to work the goldfields and later to build the Palmerston to Pine Creek railway. By 1888 there were 6,122 Chinese in the Northern Territory, mostly in or around Darwin. The early Chinese settlers were mainly from Guangdong Province. The Chinese community established Darwin Chinatown. At the end of the 19th century, anti-Chinese feelings grew in response to the 1890s economic depression, and the White Australia policy meant many Chinese left the territory. But some stayed, became British subjects, and established a commercial base in Darwin.

=== Early 20th century ===
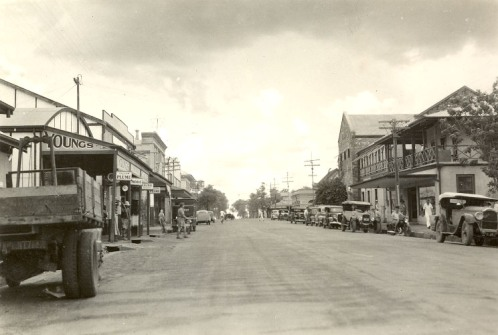
Smith Street in the 1930s

The Northern Territory was initially settled and administered by South Australia, until its transfer to the Commonwealth in 1911. In the same year, the city's official name changed from Palmerston to Darwin.

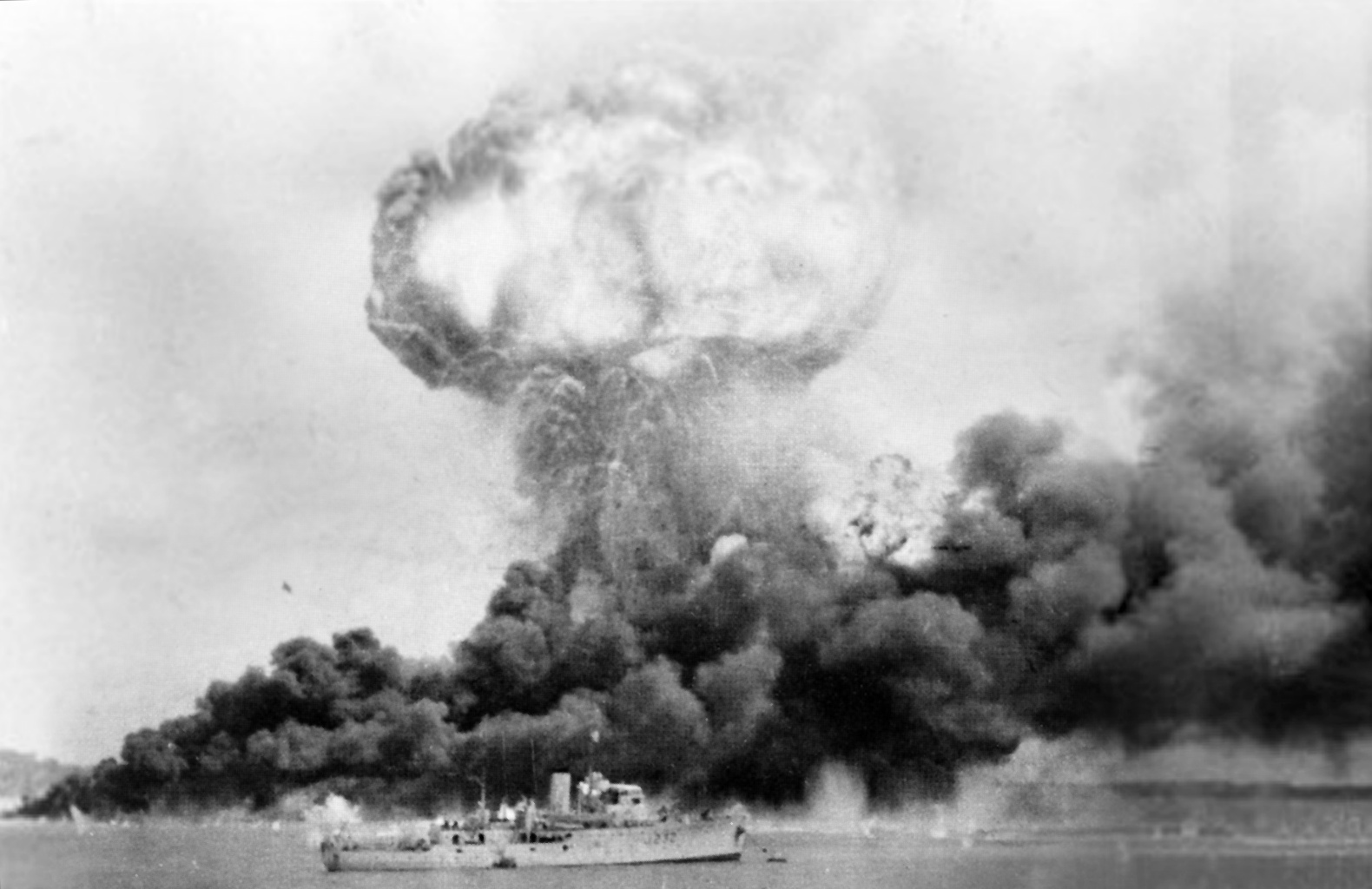
The Japanese bombings of Darwin

The period between 1911 and 1919 was filled with political turmoil, particularly with trade union unrest, which culminated on 17 December 1918. Led by Harold Nelson, some 1,000 demonstrators marched to Government House at Liberty Square in Darwin, where they burnt an effigy of the Administrator of the Northern Territory, John Gilruth, and demanded his resignation. The incident became known as the Darwin Rebellion. Their grievances were against the two main Northern Territory employers: Vestey's Meatworks and the federal government. Both Gilruth and the Vestey company left Darwin soon afterward.

On 18 October 1918, during the Spanish flu pandemic, the SS Mataram sailing from Singapore with infected passengers arrived in Darwin.

In 1931, the 17 remaining patients from the leprosarium at Cossack, Western Australia were moved to Darwin, after it closed down. It was at a time when many Aboriginal people who were thought to have leprosy or other infectious diseases were sent to lock hospitals and leprosariums under the Aborigines Act 1905, which gave the Chief Protector of Aborigines powers to arrest and send any Indigenous person suspected of having a range of diseases to one of these institutions.

Around 10,000 Australian and other Allied troops arrived in Darwin at the outset of World War II to defend Australia's northern coast. On 19 February 1942 at 9:57 am, 188 Japanese warplanes attacked Darwin in two waves. It was the same fleet that had bombed Pearl Harbor, though considerably more bombs were dropped on Darwin than on Pearl Harbor. The attack killed at least 243 people and caused immense damage to the town, airfields, and aircraft. These were by far the most serious attacks on Australia in time of war, in terms of fatalities and damage. They were the first of many raids on Darwin.

Darwin Chinatown which lay within the heart of Darwin was razed to the ground by the Japanese bombing and was never rebuilt. Northern Territory administrator Aubrey Abbott wanted to eliminate the Chinese community and forcibly seized their land as it was considered prime real estate.

Darwin was further developed after the war, with sealed roads constructed connecting the region to Alice Springs to the south and Mount Isa to the southeast, and Manton Dam built in the south to provide the city with water. On Australia Day (26 January) 1959, Darwin was granted city status.

=== 1970–present ===
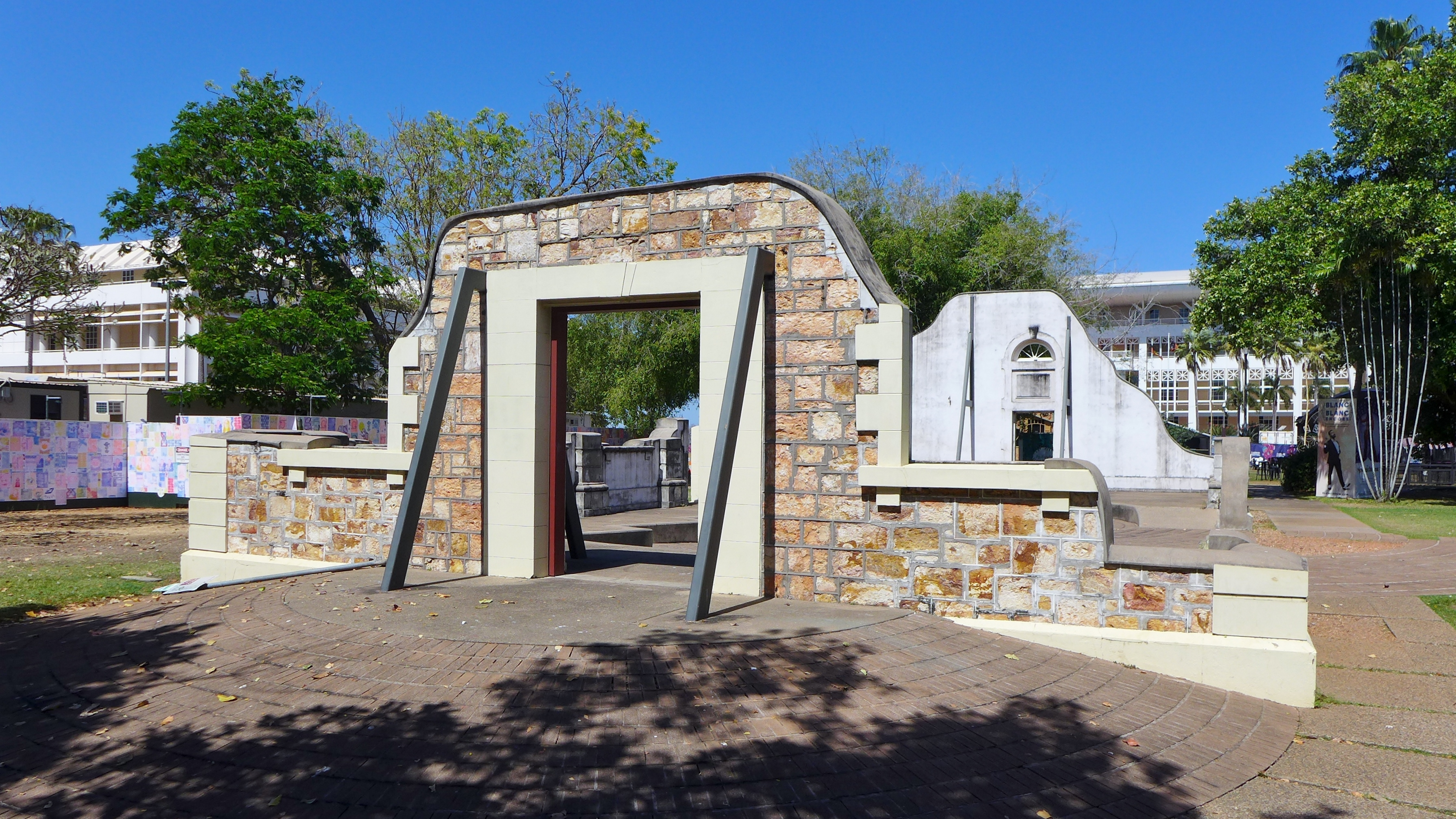
The remains of Palmerston Town Hall, destroyed by Cyclone Tracy

On 25 December 1974, Darwin was struck by Cyclone Tracy, which killed 71 people and destroyed over 70% of the city's buildings, including many old stone buildings such as the Palmerston Town Hall, which could not withstand the lateral forces the winds generated. After the disaster, 30,000 of the population of 46,000 were evacuated in the biggest airlift in Australia's history. The town was rebuilt with newer materials and techniques during the late 1970s by the Darwin Reconstruction Commission, led by former Brisbane Lord mayor Clem Jones. In the early 1980s, a satellite city of Palmerston was built 20 km (12 mi) east of Darwin.

In September 2003, the Adelaide–Darwin railway was completed, with the opening of the Alice Springs–Darwin standard gauge line.

A 2003 saltwater crocodile attack south of the city was the inspiration for the 2007 film Black Water.

=== Aviation history ===
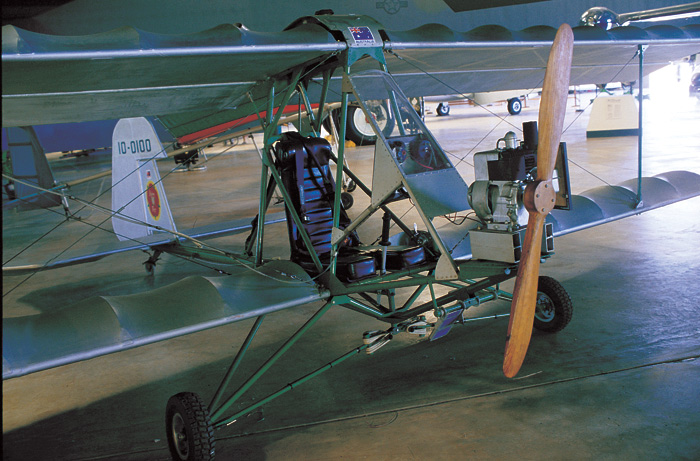
Darwin Aviation Heritage Centre – 1st Ultralight – Hover Bird

Darwin hosted many of aviation's early pioneers. On 10 December 1919, Captain Ross Smith and his crew landed in Darwin and won a £10,000 prize from the Australian government for completing the first flight from London to Australia in under 30 days. Smith and his crew flew a Vickers Vimy, G-EAOU, and landed on an airstrip that has become Ross Smith Avenue.

Other aviation pioneers include Amy Johnson, Amelia Earhart, Sir Charles Kingsford Smith and Bert Hinkler. The original QANTAS Empire Airways Ltd Hangar, a registered heritage site, was part of the original Darwin Civil Aerodrome in Parap and is now a museum that still bears scars from the bombing of Darwin during World War II.

Darwin was home to Australian and U.S. pilots during the war, with airstrips built in and around Darwin. Today Darwin provides a staging ground for military exercises.

Darwin was a compulsory stopover and checkpoint in the London-to-Melbourne Centenary Air Race in 1934. The official name of the race was the MacRobertson Air Race. Winners of the race were Tom Campbell Black and C. W. A. Scott.

The following is an excerpt from Time magazine, 29 October 1934:

Third Day. Biggest sensation of the race came just before dawn on the third day, when burly Lieutenant Scott and dapper Captain Black flew their scarlet Comet into Darwin. They had covered the last 300 miles [480 km] over water on one motor, risked death landing on a field made soggy by the first rain in seven months. Said sandy-haired Lieutenant Scott: "We've had a devil of a trip." But they had flown 9000 miles [14000 km] in two days, had broken the England to Australia record of 162 hr. in the unbelievable time of 52hr. 33 min., were only 2000 miles [3200 km] from their goal at Melbourne.

The Darwin Aviation Museum is about 8 km (5 mi) from the city centre on the Stuart Highway and is one of only three places outside the United States where a B-52 bomber (on permanent loan from the United States Air Force) is on public display.

== Geography ==
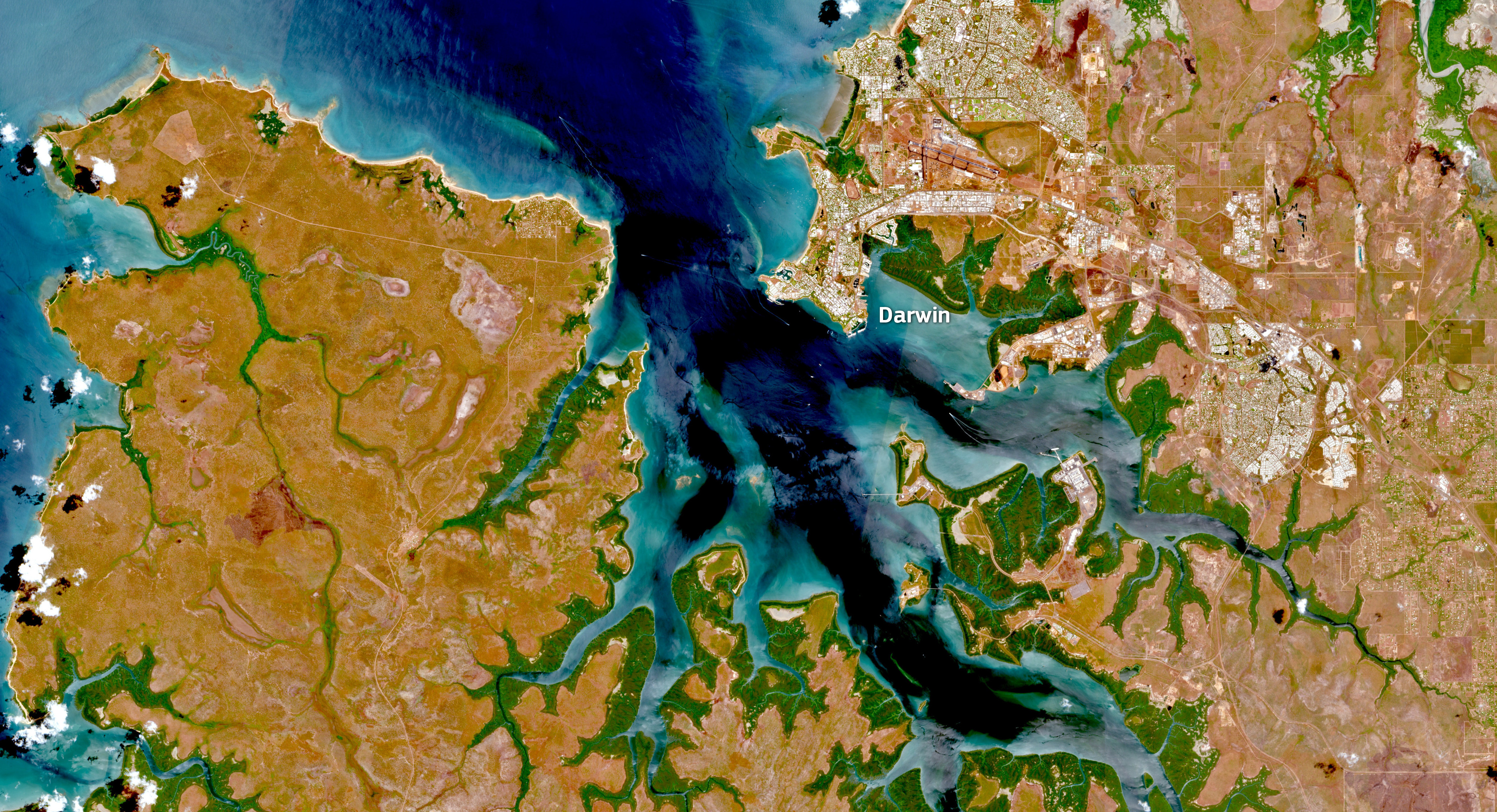
A satellite image of Darwin and the surrounding areas.

Darwin is a coastal city, situated along the western shoreline of the Northern Territory. The water meets the land from the Beagle Gulf, which extends out into the Timor Sea. The central business district occupies a low bluff overlooking Darwin Harbour to the south, beyond which lie East Arm, Middle Arm, Northern Territory, and, across the gulf, West Arm. Middle Arm has an industrial precinct on the peninsula, which is being promoted as a sustainable development area that will include plants for industries such as low-emission petrochemicals, renewable hydrogen, and carbon capture storage. Darwin is flanked by Frances Bay to the east and Cullen Bay to the west.

The rest of the city is relatively flat and low-lying, and areas bordering the coast are home to recreational reserves, extensive beaches, and excellent fishing.

=== City and suburbs ===
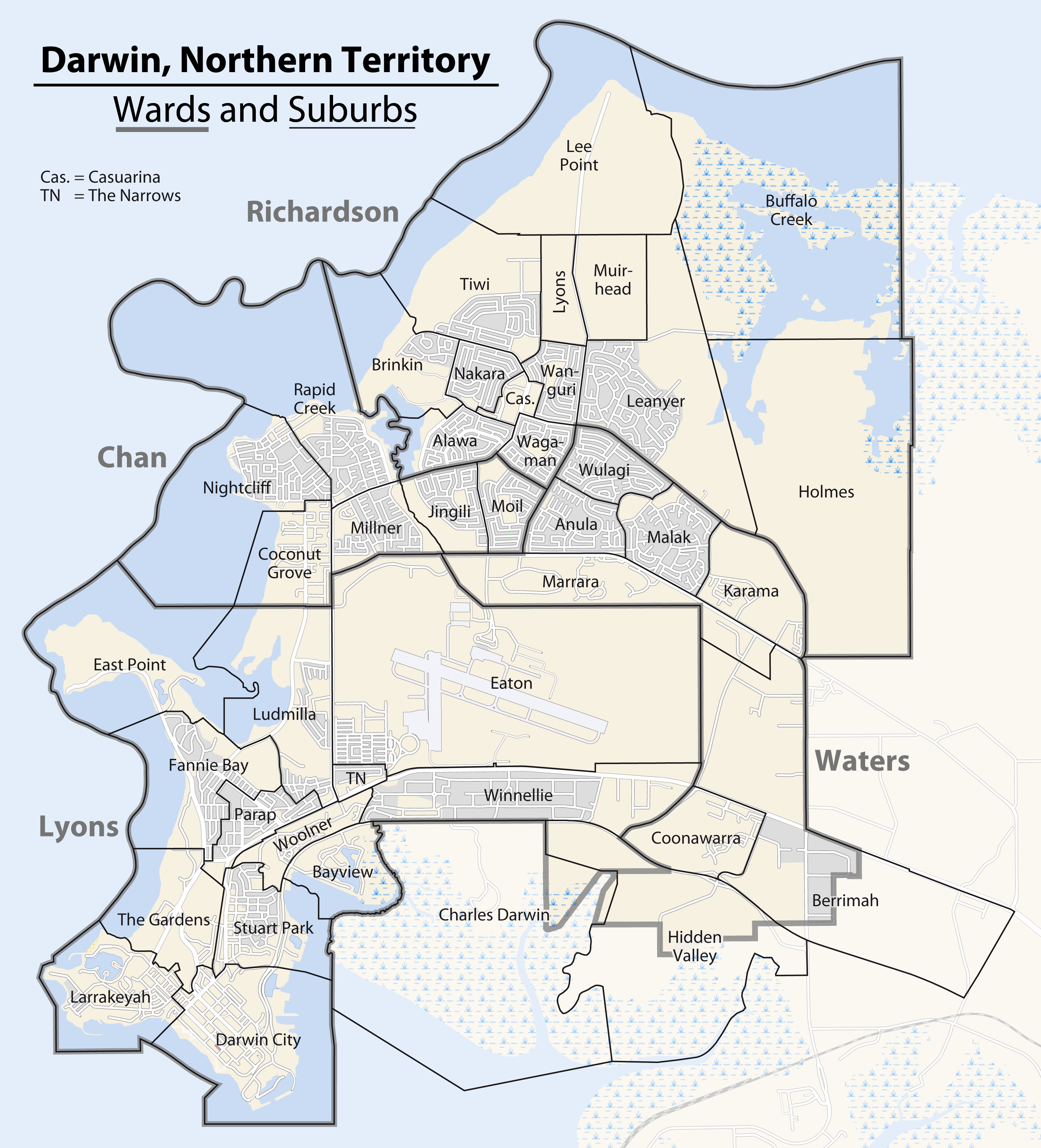
A map of Darwin's suburbs

Darwin and its suburbs spread in an approximately triangular shape, with the older southwestern suburbs—and the city itself—forming one corner, the newer northern suburbs another, and the eastern suburbs, progressing towards Palmerston, forming the third.

The older part of Darwin is separated from the newer northern suburbs by Darwin International Airport and RAAF Base Darwin. Palmerston is a satellite city 20 km (12 mi) east of Darwin that was established in the 1980s and is one of Australia's fastest-growing municipalities. Darwin's rural areas, including Howard Springs, Humpty Doo and Berry Springs, are experiencing strong growth.

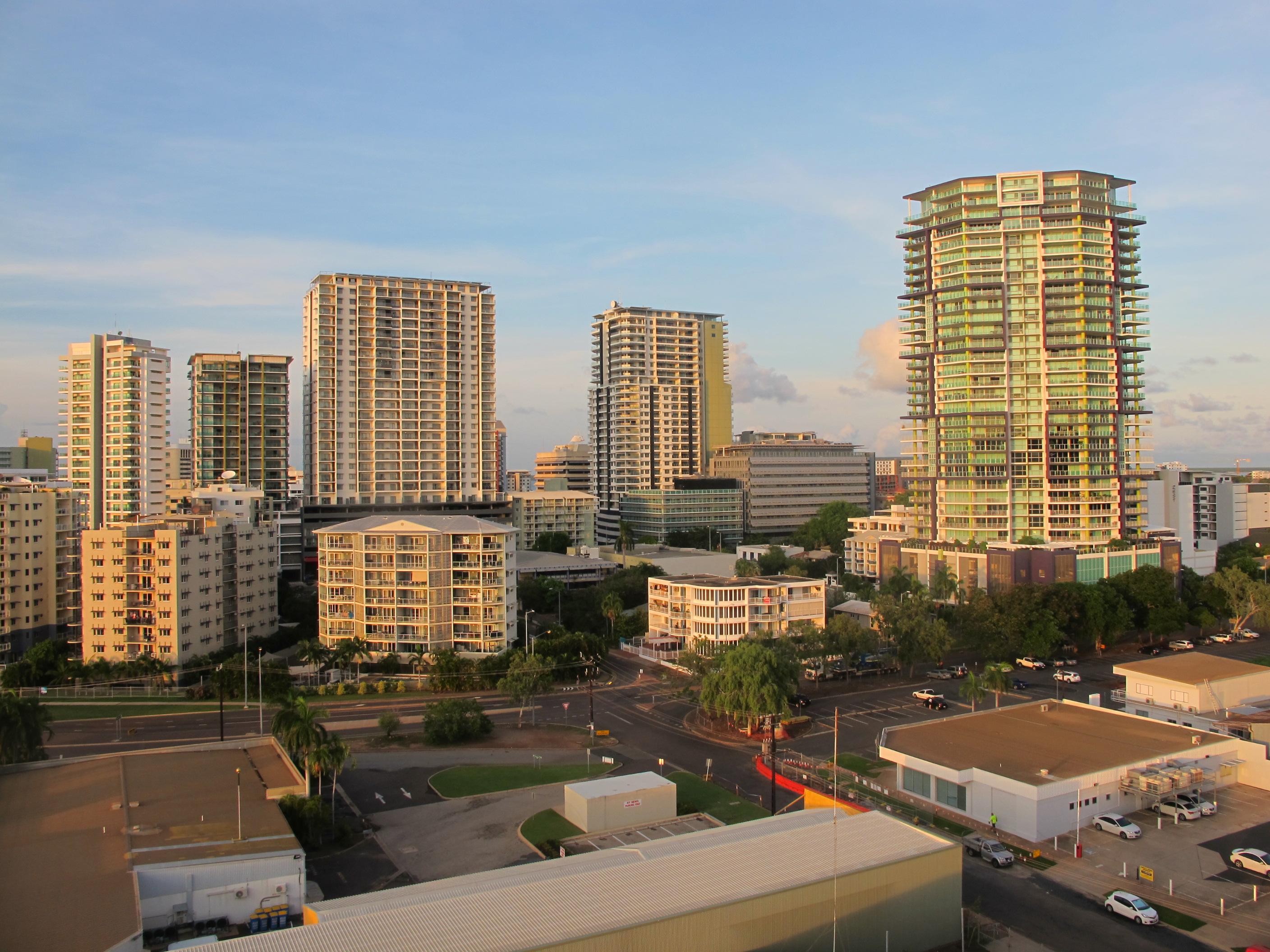
Darwin city centre

Darwin's central business district (CBD) is bounded by Daly Street in the northwest, McMinn Street in the northeast, Mitchell Street on the southwest, and Bennett Street on the southeast. The CBD has been the focus of a number of major projects, such as the billion-dollar redevelopment of the Stokes Hill wharf waterfront area, including a convention centre with seating for 1,500 people and approximately 4,000 square metres (43,000 sq ft) of exhibition space. The developers announced that this includes hotels, residential apartments, and public space. The city's main industrial areas are along the Stuart Highway toward Palmerston, centred on Winnellie. The area's largest shopping precinct is Casuarina Square.

The most expensive residential areas stand along the coast in suburbs such as the marina of Cullen Bay, Larrakeyah, Bayview and Brinkin. These low-lying regions are at risk during cyclones and higher tides, but adequate drainage and stringent building regulations have reduced the potential damage to buildings or injury to residents. The inner northern suburbs are home to lower-income households, although low-income Territory Housing units are scattered throughout the metropolitan area. The suburb of Lyons was part of a multi-stage land release and development in the Northern Suburbs; planning, development and construction took place from 2004 to 2009. More recent developments near Lyons subdivision includes the suburb of Muirhead.

=== Climate ===
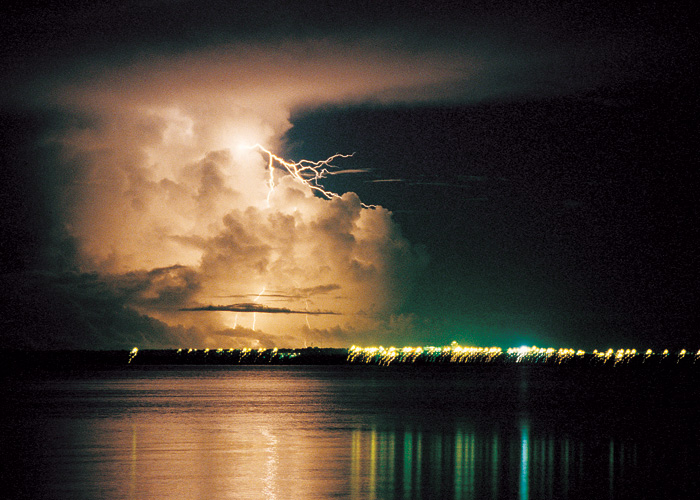
A wet-season storm at night in January

Darwin has a tropical savanna climate (Köppen Aw) with distinct wet and dry seasons, and the average maximum temperature is similar year round. The Australian Building Codes Board classifies it as Climate Zone 1 under the National Construction Code (NCC). Climate zones are a broad classification of climate zones in the NCC ranging from one to eight, categorising the different climates of Australia. The sun passes directly overhead in mid-October and mid-February.

The dry season runs from about May to September, during which nearly every day is sunny, and afternoon relative humidity averages around 30%. The hottest months are October and November, just before the onset of the main rain season. The temperature is usually below 35 °C (95 °F). The heat index sometimes rises above 45 °C (113 °F) due to humidity levels. The wet season runs generally between December and March, with a transition towards the dry season in April.

The average temperature of the sea ranges from 25.8 °C (78.4 °F) in July to 31.5 °C (88.7 °F) in December.

==== Dry season ====
The driest period of the year, seeing about 5 mm (0.20 in) of monthly rainfall on average, is between May and September. In the coolest months, June and July, the daily minimum temperature may dip as low as 14 °C (57 °F), but very rarely lower, and a temperature lower than 10 °C (50 °F) has never been recorded in the city centre. Outer suburbs away from the coast occasionally record temperatures as low as 5 °C (41 °F) in the dry season. Because of its long dry season, Darwin has the second-highest average daily hours of sunshine (8.4) of any Australian capital, with the most sunshine from April to November. Only Perth, Western Australia, averages more (8.8).

==== Wet season ====
The wet season is associated with tropical cyclones and monsoon rains. Most rainfall occurs between December and March when thunderstorms are common, and afternoon relative humidity averages over 70 percent during the wettest months. It does not rain every day during the wet season, but most days have plentiful cloud cover; January averages under six hours of bright sunshine daily. This cloud cover means the wet season is not the hottest period of the year, despite daytime hours being the longest at this time. The 3pm dewpoint average in the wet season is around 24.0 °C (75.2 °F). Darwin's highest daily rainfall verified by the Bureau of Meteorology is 367.6 millimetres (14.47 in), which fell when Cyclone Carlos bore down on the Darwin area on 16 February 2011. February 2011 was also Darwin's wettest month ever recorded, with 1,110.2 millimetres (43.71 in) at the airport.

==== Extremes ====
Extreme temperatures at the Darwin Post Office Station have ranged from 40.4 °C (104.7 °F) on 17 October 1892 to 13.4 °C (56.1 °F) on 25 June 1891. Extreme temperatures at the Darwin Airport station, which is farther from the coast and routinely records cooler temperatures than the post office station, which is in Darwin's CBD, have ranged from 38.9 °C (102.0 °F) on 18 October 1982 to 10.4 °C (50.7 °F) on 29 July 1942. The highest minimum temperature on record is 30.7 °C (87.3 °F) on 18 January 1928 for the post office station and 29.7 °C (85.5 °F) on both 25 November 1987 and 17 December 2014 for the airport station. The lowest maximum temperature on record is 18.4 °C (65.1 °F) on 3 June 1904 for the post office station and 21.1 °C (70.0 °F) on 14 July 1968 for the airport station.

For a 147‑day period during the 2012 dry season, from 5 May to 29 September, Darwin recorded no precipitation. Prolonged periods of no precipitation are common in the dry season in Northern Australia, particularly in the Northern Territory and northern regions of Western Australia, although a no-rainfall event of this extent is rare.

Darwin occupies one of the most lightning-prone areas in Australia. On 31 January 2002 an early-morning squall line produced over 5,000 cloud-to-ground lightning strikes within a 60-kilometre (37 mi) radius of Darwin alone—about three times the amount of lightning that Perth experiences on average in an entire year.

Climate data for Darwin Airport, Northern Territory, Australia, 1991–2020 averages, extremes 1941–present
Month	Jan	Feb	Mar	Apr	May	Jun	Jul	Aug	Sep	Oct	Nov	Dec	Year
Record high °C (°F)	36.1 (97.0)	36.0 (96.8)	36.0 (96.8)	36.7 (98.1)	36.0 (96.8)	35.0 (95.0)	35.0 (95.0)	37.0 (98.6)	38.0 (100.4)	38.9 (102.0)	37.3 (99.1)	37.1 (98.8)	38.9 (102.0)
Mean maximum °C (°F)	34.2 (93.6)	33.8 (92.8)	34.5 (94.1)	34.8 (94.6)	34.3 (93.7)	33.5 (92.3)	33.4 (92.1)	34.5 (94.1)	35.8 (96.4)	36.2 (97.2)	35.8 (96.4)	35.3 (95.5)	36.8 (98.2)
Mean daily maximum °C (°F)	32.0 (89.6)	31.7 (89.1)	32.3 (90.1)	33.0 (91.4)	32.3 (90.1)	31.1 (88.0)	31.1 (88.0)	31.9 (89.4)	33.1 (91.6)	33.8 (92.8)	33.7 (92.7)	33.0 (91.4)	32.4 (90.4)
Mean daily minimum °C (°F)	25.1 (77.2)	25.1 (77.2)	24.9 (76.8)	24.2 (75.6)	22.3 (72.1)	20.0 (68.0)	19.3 (66.7)	19.8 (67.6)	22.9 (73.2)	24.8 (76.6)	25.4 (77.7)	25.5 (77.9)	23.3 (73.9)
Mean minimum °C (°F)	22.2 (72.0)	22.4 (72.3)	22.3 (72.1)	21.3 (70.3)	18.3 (64.9)	15.5 (59.9)	15.5 (59.9)	15.9 (60.6)	19.4 (66.9)	21.9 (71.4)	21.8 (71.2)	22.4 (72.3)	14.3 (57.7)
Record low °C (°F)	20.2 (68.4)	17.2 (63.0)	19.2 (66.6)	16.0 (60.8)	13.8 (56.8)	12.1 (53.8)	10.4 (50.7)	13.0 (55.4)	14.3 (57.7)	19.0 (66.2)	19.3 (66.7)	19.8 (67.6)	10.4 (50.7)
Average rainfall mm (inches)	470.7 (18.53)	412.4 (16.24)	313.7 (12.35)	105.1 (4.14)	20.7 (0.81)	2.1 (0.08)	0.9 (0.04)	0.8 (0.03)	14.3 (0.56)	68.9 (2.71)	143.5 (5.65)	279.3 (11.00)	1,832.4 (72.14)
Average rainy days (≥ 1 mm)	19.6	18.2	16.8	7.6	1.7	0.2	0.1	0.2	1.5	5.5	10.1	15.0	96.5
Average afternoon relative humidity (%)	71	74	67	52	41	36	36	38	47	51	58	66	53
Average dew point °C (°F)	24.2 (75.6)	24.3 (75.7)	23.4 (74.1)	19.8 (67.6)	15.8 (60.4)	12.4 (54.3)	11.8 (53.2)	13.1 (55.6)	18.1 (64.6)	20.3 (68.5)	22.3 (72.1)	23.6 (74.5)	19.1 (66.4)
Mean monthly sunshine hours	176.7	162.4	213.9	264.0	300.7	303.0	319.3	325.5	297.0	294.5	255.0	198.4	3,110.4
Mean daily sunshine hours	5.7	5.8	6.9	8.8	9.7	10.1	10.3	10.5	9.9	9.5	8.5	6.5	8.5
Percentage possible sunshine	45	48	57	74	83	86	87	87	82	78	69	52	71
Average ultraviolet index	13	14	13	11	9	8	8	10	12	13	13	13	11

Climate data for Darwin airport
Month	Jan	Feb	Mar	Apr	May	Jun	Jul	Aug	Sep	Oct	Nov	Dec	Year
Mean number of days with precipitation > 10.0 mm (0.39 in)	11.4	10.0	8.7	2.8	0.7	0	0	0	0.4	2.2	4.1	7.4	47.7
Mean number of days with Max temperature > 30.0 °C (86.0 °F)	26.8	23.6	28.2	28.8	28.9	23.5	24.8	29.3	29.9	30.8	29.8	29.1	333.4
Mean number of cloudy days	23.3	21.2	17.1	11.4	4.2	2.8	1.4	1.4	2.6	3.9	9.7	19.5	118.5
Mean number of days with wind speed > 5 m/s (18 km/h)	7.8	7.5	2.9	1.5	2.0	3.1	2.5	1.2	0.9	1.3	1.4	3.5	35.6
Mean wind speed	4.1	4.1	3.3	3.3	3.6	3.7	3.6	3.5	3.5	3.6	3.4	3.6	3.6

== Demographics ==
=== Ancestry and immigration ===
Country of birth (2021)
Birthplace (Note: In accordance with the Australian Bureau of Statistics source, England, Scotland, Mainland China and the Special Administrative Regions of Hong Kong and Macau are listed separately. Wales and Northern Ireland are also listed separately but number fewer than 1000, so are omitted here.)	Population
Australia	89,266
Philippines	5,283
India	3,820
England	3,764
Nepal	2,540
New Zealand	2,437
Mainland China	1,407
Indonesia	1,292
Greece	1,146

Darwin's population changed after the Second World War. Like many other Australian cities, Darwin had influxes from Europe, with significant numbers of Italians and Greeks in the 1960s and 1970s. It also had immigration from other European countries, including Dutch, Germans, and many others. A significant proportion of Darwin's residents are recent immigrants from Asia, including people from East Timor.

Historical Populations of Darwin
Year	Pop.	±%
1911	1,082	—
1921	1,399	+29.3%
1933	1,566	+11.9%
1947	2,538	+62.1%
1954	8,071	+218.0%
1961	15,477	+91.8%
1966	21,671	+40.0%
1971	37,100	+71.2%
1976	44,200	+19.1%
1981	61,412	+38.9%
1986	75,360	+22.7%
1991	86,415	+14.7%
1996	95,829	+10.9%
2001	106,842	+11.5%
2006	105,991	−0.8%
2011	129,106	+21.8%
2016	145,916	+13.0%
2021	139,902	−4.1%

At the 2021 census, the most commonly nominated ancestries were: (Note: As a percentage of 119,944 persons who nominated their ancestry at the 2016 census.)

- Australian (38.8%) (Note: The Australian Bureau of Statistics has stated that most who nominate "Australian" as their ancestry are part of the Anglo-Celtic group.)
- English (27.6%)
- Indigenous (10.4%) (Note: Of any ancestry. Includes those identifying as Aboriginal Australians or Torres Strait Islanders. Indigenous identification is separate to the ancestry question on the Australian Census and persons identifying as Aboriginal or Torres Strait Islander may identify any ancestry.)
- Irish (8.5%)
- Scottish (7.4%)
- Filipino (4.9%)
- Chinese (4.2%)
- German (4.1%)
- Greek (2.8%)
- Indian (2.8%)
- Italian (2.3%)

In 2016, 38.3% of the population was born overseas. The five largest groups of overseas-born were from the Philippines (3.6%), England (3.1%), New Zealand (2.1%), India (2%) and Greece (0.9%).

In 2016, 10.4% of the population, or 14,539 people, identified as Indigenous Australians (Aboriginal Australians and/or Torres Strait Islanders). (Note: Of any ancestry. Includes those identifying as Aboriginal Australians or Torres Strait Islanders. Indigenous identification is separate to the ancestry question on the Australian Census and persons identifying as Aboriginal or Torres Strait Islander may identify any ancestry.) This is the largest proportion of any Australian capital city.

=== Language ===
At the 2016 census, 58% of the population spoke only English at home. Other languages spoken at home include Tagalog (3.7%), Greek (3.5%), Mandarin (2.0%), Nepali (1.2%), Indonesian (1.0%), Australian Aboriginal languages (1.0%), Malayalam (0.9%), Vietnamese (0.8%), Cantonese (0.7%), Italian (0.6%), Portuguese (0.5%, mostly spoken by Timorese), and Tamil (0.5%).

=== Age ===
In 2011, the Darwin population averaged 33 years old, compared to the national average of 37, to a large extent because of the military presence and because many people opt to retire elsewhere.

=== Religion ===
In 2021, 41.7% of Darwin residents did not affiliate with any formal religion. The largest religious categories were Roman Catholicism (18.2%) and Anglican (5.2%).

== Law and government ==
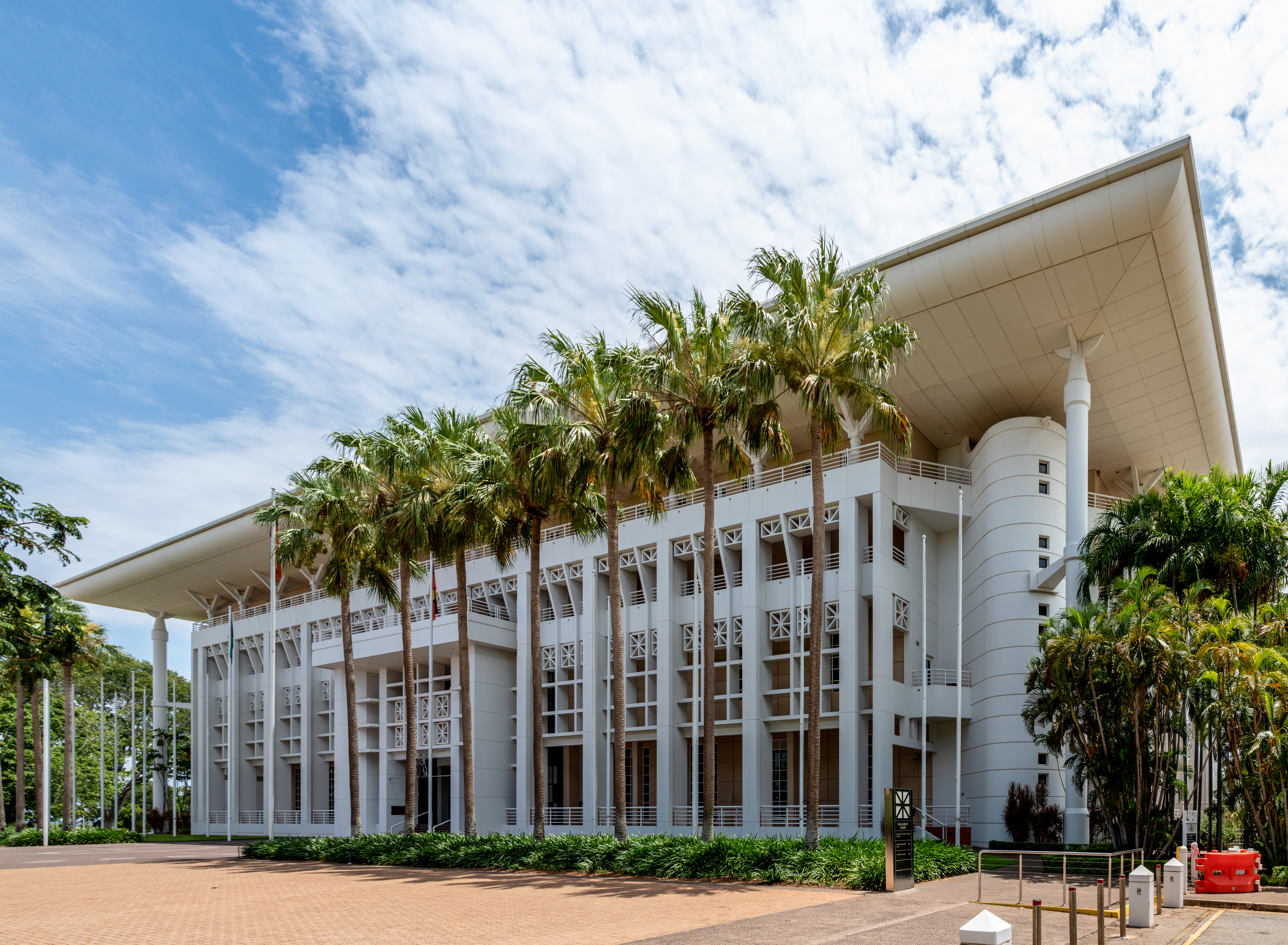
Legislative Assembly of the Northern Territory

The Darwin City Council governs the City of Darwin, which takes in the CBD and the suburbs. The city has been governed by a city council form of government since 1957. The council consists of 13 elected members, the lord mayor, and 12 aldermen.

The City of Darwin electorate is organised into four electoral units or wards. The wards are Chan, Lyons, Richardson, and Waters. The constituents of each ward are directly responsible for electing three aldermen. Constituents of all wards are directly responsible for electing the Lord Mayor of Darwin. Since the 2024 council elections, the mayor has been Peter Styles.

The rest of the Darwin area is divided into three local government areas—the Palmerston City Council, Litchfield Municipality and the Shire of Coomalie. These areas have elected councils that are responsible for functions delegated to them by the Northern Territory Government, such as planning and garbage collection.

The Legislative Assembly of the Northern Territory convenes in Darwin in the Northern Territory Parliament House. Government House, the official residence of the Administrator of the Northern Territory, is on the Esplanade.

Darwin is split between nine electoral divisions in the Legislative Assembly—Port Darwin, Fannie Bay, Fong Lim, Nightcliff, Sanderson, Johnston, Casuarina, Wanguri, and Karama. Historically, Darwin voters elected Country Liberal Party members. Since the turn of the 21st century, voters have often selected Labor members, particularly in the more diverse northern section.

In the 2024 Northern Territory general election, seven of Darwin's nine Legislative Assembly electoral divisions returned to the CLP. This contrasts with Labor holding both the Northern Territory's federal electorates, Solomon and Lingiari. The two Darwin electoral divisions not held by the CLP are Nightcliff, which elected the first NT Greens member to the Legislative Assembly, and Johnstone, which is held by an independent.

Also on the Esplanade is the Supreme Court of the Northern Territory. Darwin has a Magistrate's Court on the corner of Cavenagh and Bennett streets, close to the Darwin City Council Chambers.

=== Crime ===
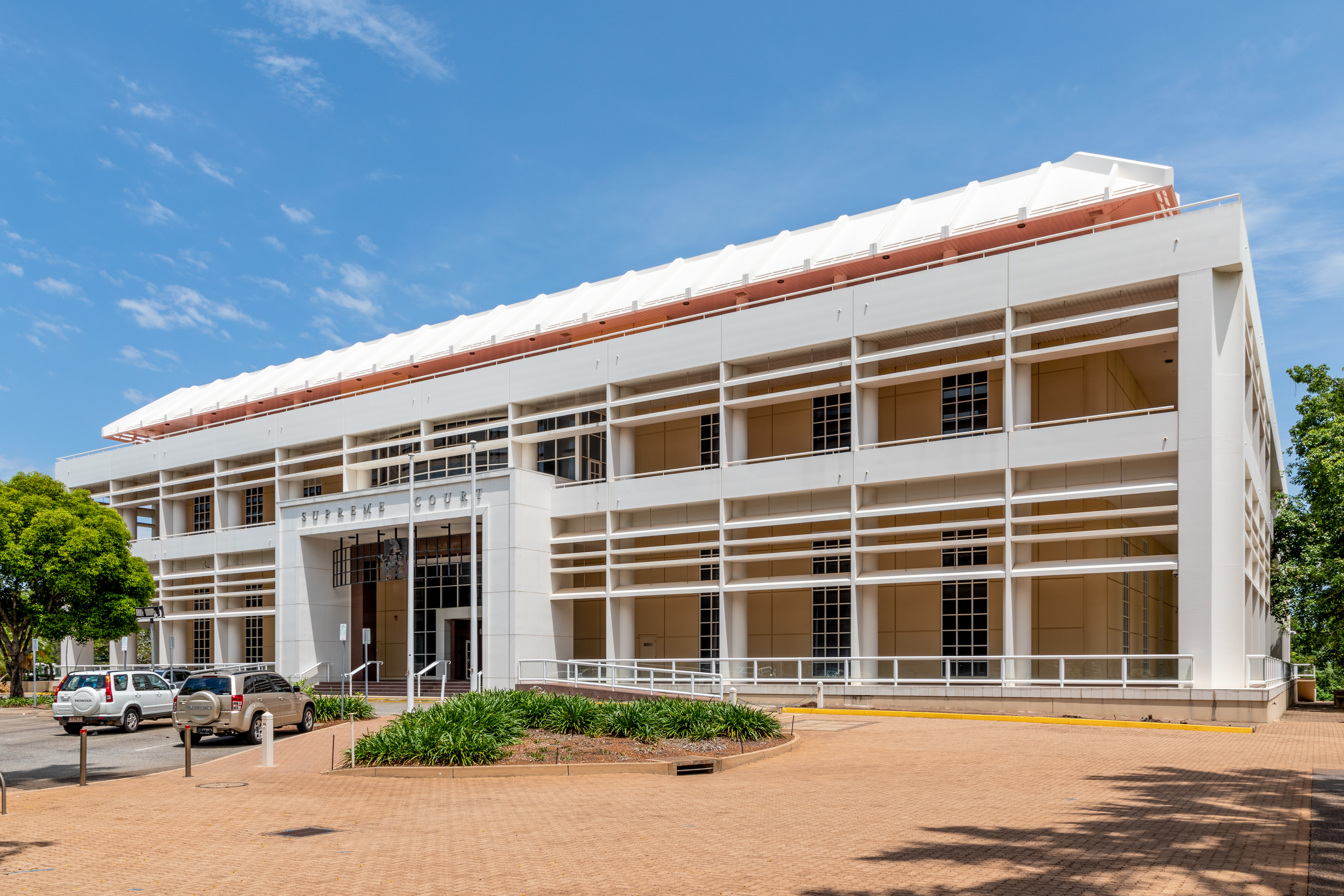
Supreme Court of the Northern Territory

Darwin's police force are members of the Northern Territory Police, under the NT Police Darwin Metropolitan Command. The Darwin urban centre includes Darwin City and the associated suburbs from Buffalo Creek, Berrimah, and East Arm westwards, representing around 35% of the Northern Territory's population. Palmerston urban centre closely approximates the Palmerston Local Government Area, and represents approximately 13% of the Northern Territory's population.

Darwin has had a publicised history of alcohol abuse and violent crime, with 6,000 reported assaults in 2009, of which 350 resulted in broken jaws and noses—more than anywhere else in the world, according to the Royal Darwin Hospital.

Mitchell Street, with its numerous pubs, clubs and other entertainment venues, was one of the areas policed by the CitySafe Unit, launched by the NT Chief Minister Paul Henderson in February 2009. It was credited with success in tackling alcohol abuse linked to crime, and the NT police were looking at establishing a specialist licensing enforcement unit in 2010.

The First Response Patrol, run by Larrakia Nation, which helps move homeless Indigenous women out of dangerous situations, was credited with the decline in sexual assaults in 2009. The service operates every day from 5am to 2am.

=== Recent trends ===
In the 10 months between 1 October 2018, the date that the alcohol floor price and various other measures were imposed by the NT government following the Riley Review, and 31 July 2019, alcohol-related assaults dropped by 16%, and domestic violence by 9% in the Darwin area.

The rate of offending in most categories of crime dropped in the Darwin urban area between 2018 and 2019, with the notable exceptions of motor vehicle theft and break-ins, both up about 12%. Apart from sexual assault, which rose from 21 to 46, all other categories of crime declined in Palmerston.

== Economy ==
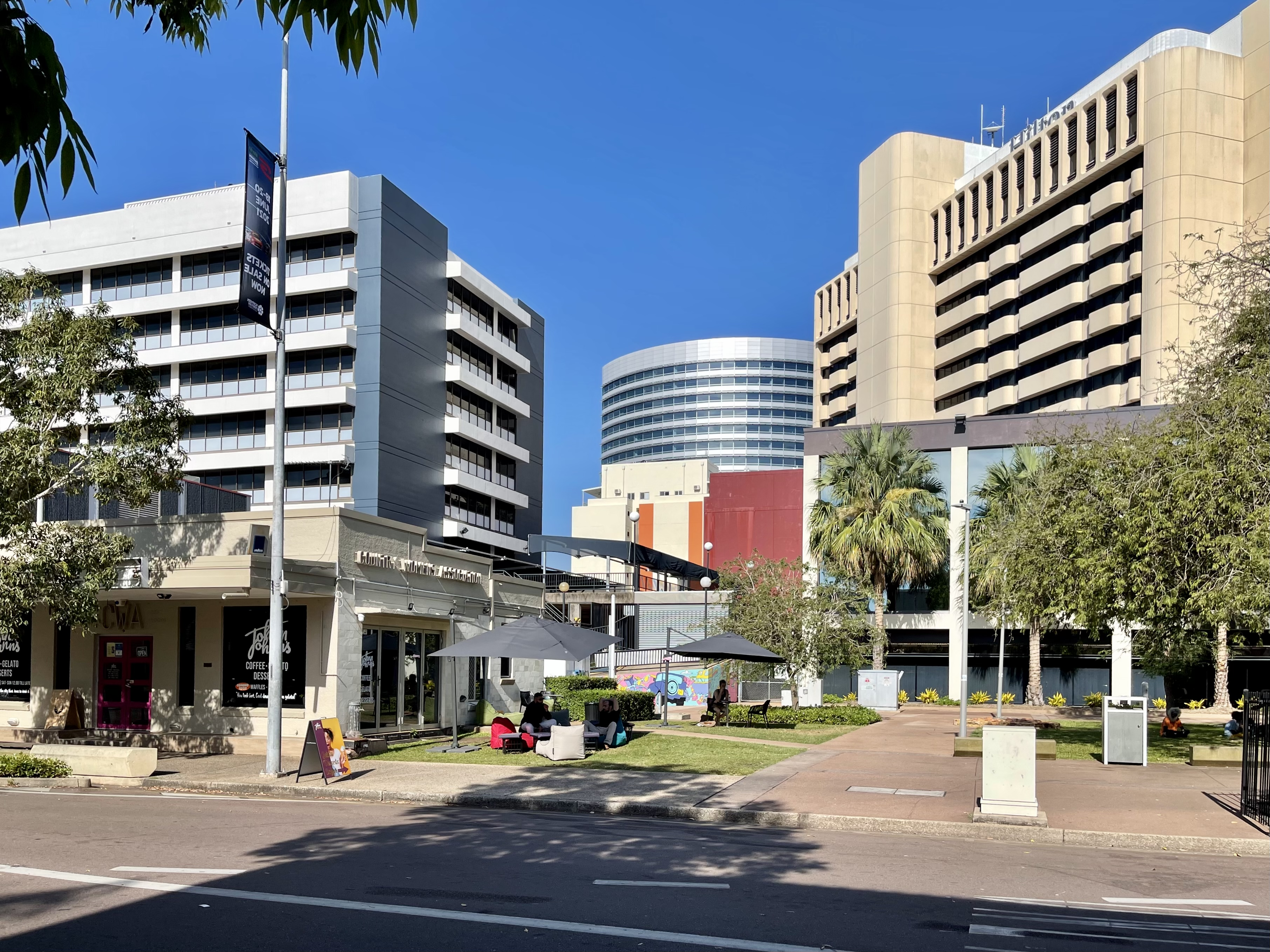
Knuckey Street in the Darwin CBD

The two largest economic sectors are mining and tourism. Given its location, Darwin serves as a gateway for many Australian travellers to Asia. Mining and energy industry production exceeds $2.5 billion per annum. The most important mineral resources are gold, zinc, and bauxite, along with manganese and many others. The energy production is mostly off-shore with oil and natural gas from the Timor Sea, although there are significant uranium deposits near Darwin. Tourism employs 8% of Darwin residents and is expected to grow as domestic and international tourists now spend time in Darwin during the wet and dry seasons.

Federal spending is a major contributor to the local economy. Darwin's importance as a port is expected to grow, due to the increased exploitation of petroleum in the nearby Timor Sea and to the completion of the Adelaide-Darwin railway line in 2004 and continued expansion in trade with Asia. During 2005, a number of major construction projects started in Darwin. One is the redevelopment of the Wharf Precinct, which includes a large convention and exhibition centre, apartment housing including Outrigger Pandanas and Evolution on Gardiner, retail and entertainment outlets including a large wave pool and safe swimming lagoon. The Chinatown project has also started with plans to construct Chinese-themed retail and dining outlets.

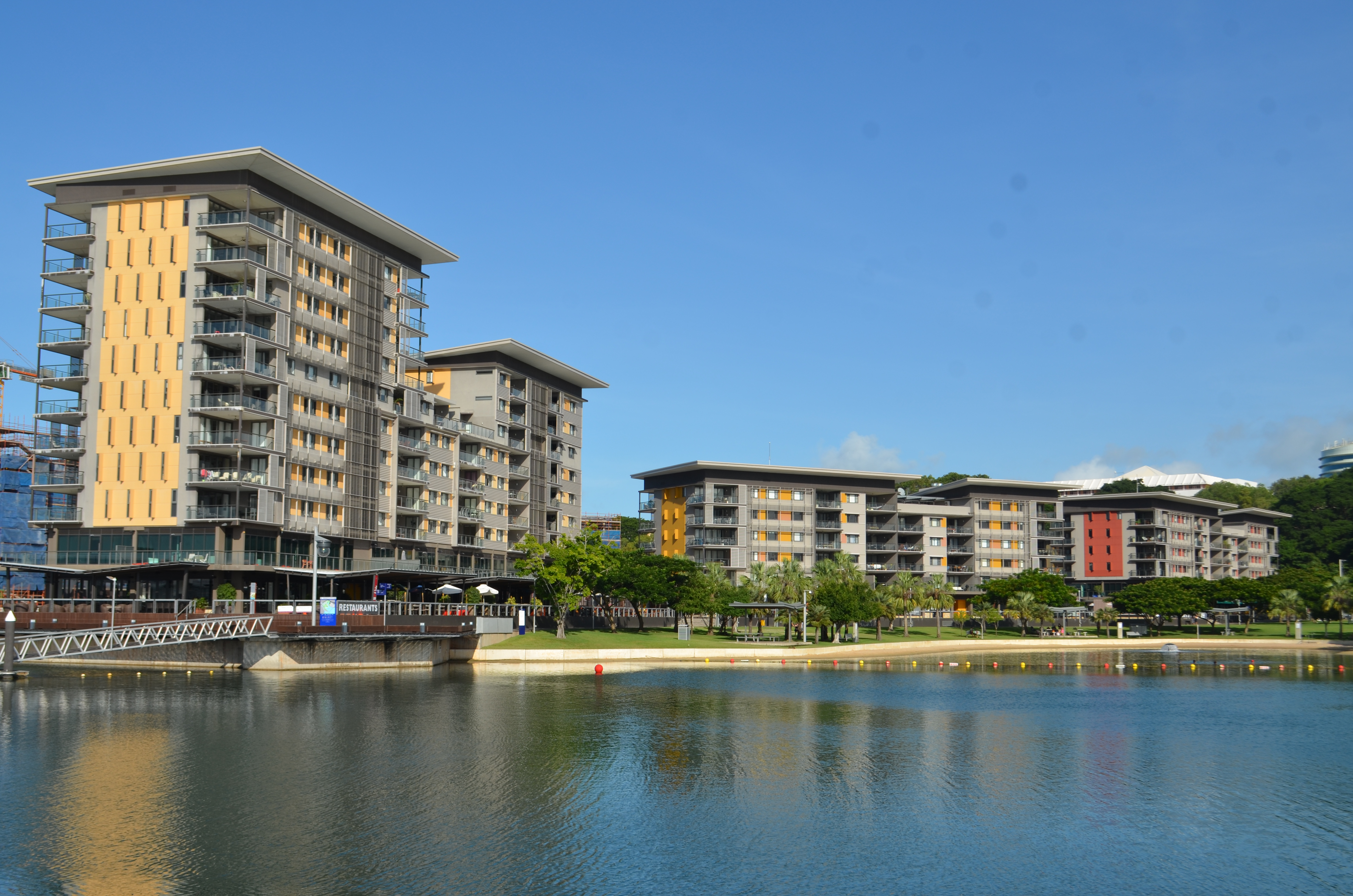
Darwin's Waterfront is a popular tourist hub

=== Tourism ===
Tourism is one of Darwin's largest industries and a major employment sector for the Northern Territory. In 2005–2006, 1.38 million people visited the Northern Territory. They stayed for 9.2 million nights and spent over $1.5 billion. The tourism industry directly employed 8,391 Territorians in June 2006, and, when indirect employment is included, tourism typically accounts for more than 14,000 jobs across the Territory.

Darwin is a hub for tours to Kakadu National Park, Litchfield National Park and Katherine Gorge. The year is traditionally divided into the wet and dry seasons, but there are up to six traditional seasons in Darwin. It is warm and sunny from May to September. Humidity rises during the green season, from October to April, bringing thunderstorms and monsoonal rains that rejuvenate the landscape. Tourism is largely seasonal, with most tourists visiting during the cooler dry season, from April to September.

=== Military ===
The military presence in both Darwin and the wider Northern Territory is a substantial source of employment and identity. In November 2011, Prime Minister Julia Gillard and President Barack Obama announced that the United States would station troops in Australia for the first time since World War II. The agreement between the U.S. and Australia would involve a contingent of 250 Marines arriving in Darwin in 2012, with the total number rising to a maximum of 2,500 troops by 2017 on six-month rotations and a supporting air element including F-22 Raptors, F-35 Joint Strike Fighters and KC-135 refuellers. China and Indonesia have expressed concern about the announcement.

Some analysts, such as Sam Roggeveen have argued that an expanded U.S. presence could pose a threat to security. The first 200 U.S. Marines arrived in Darwin from Hawaii in April 2012. In 2013, further news of other expansion vectors aired in U.S. media, with no comment or confirmation from Australian authorities. The full extent of the details of the agreement between the two governments is not available to the public.

Marine numbers based in Darwin increased to more than 1,150 by 2014. In a 2019 telephone survey of local residents, 51% of respondents had positive feelings about the U.S. troop presence, with 6% responding negatively. In late 2021, the U.S. Department of Defense signed a contract to create a 300 million litres (79,000,000 US gal) fuel storage facility at East Arm.

Darwin hosts biennial multi-nation exercises named "Pitch Black". In 2014 this involved military personnel from Australia, New Zealand, Singapore, Thailand, United Arab Emirates, and the United States.

== Education ==
Education is overseen territory-wide by the Department of Education and Training (DET), whose role is to continually improve education outcomes for all students, with a focus on Indigenous students.

=== Preschool, primary and secondary ===
Darwin is served by a number of public and private schools that cater to local and overseas students. In 2008, over 16,500 primary and secondary students were enrolled in schools in Darwin, with 10,524 students attending primary education, and 5,932 students attending secondary education. Over 12,089 students are enrolled in government schools, and 2,124 in independent schools.

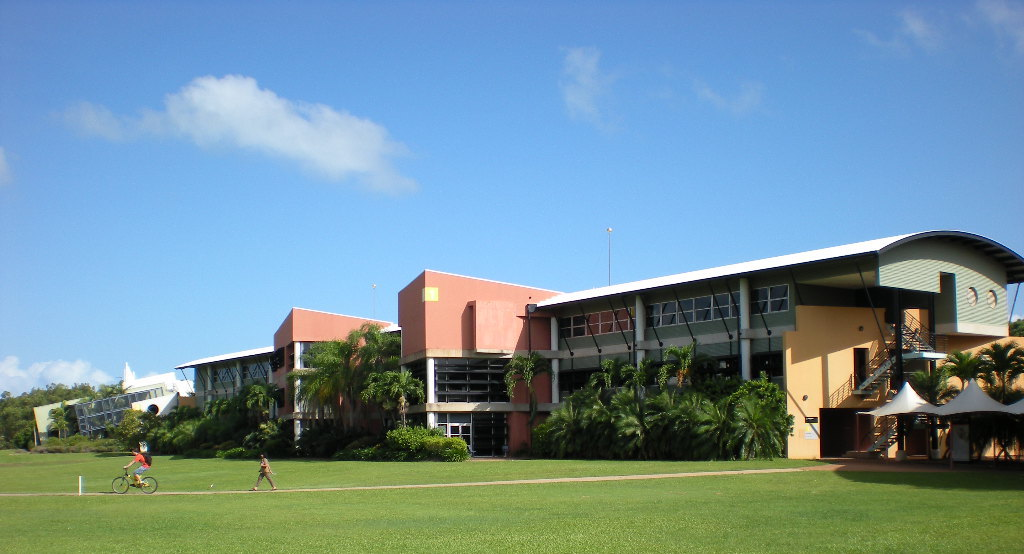
Charles Darwin University

In 2009, there were 9,764 students attending schools in the City of Darwin area. 6,045 students attended primary schools and 3,719 attended secondary schools. Over 7,161 students are enrolled in government schools and 1,108 in independent schools. There are over 35 primary and pre-schools and 12 secondary schools, including both government and non-government.

Most schools in Darwin are secular, but there are a small number of Catholic and Lutheran institutions. Students intending to complete their secondary education work toward either the Northern Territory Certificate of Education, the Victorian Certificate of Education, or the Victorian Certificate of Applied Learning. The Victorian awards are offered only at Haileybury Rendall School. Until the sale and restructuring of Kormilda College in 2018, it was the only school to offer the International Baccalaureate in the Northern Territory.

Schools have been restructured into Primary, Middle, and High schools since the beginning of 2007.

=== Tertiary and vocational ===
Darwin's largest university is Charles Darwin University, the Northern Territory's central provider of tertiary education. It has vocational and academic courses, acting as both a university and an Institute of TAFE. More than 5,500 students are enrolled in tertiary and further education courses.

Darwin has several private vocational colleges, including Alana Kaye College and Latitude College.

== Architecture ==
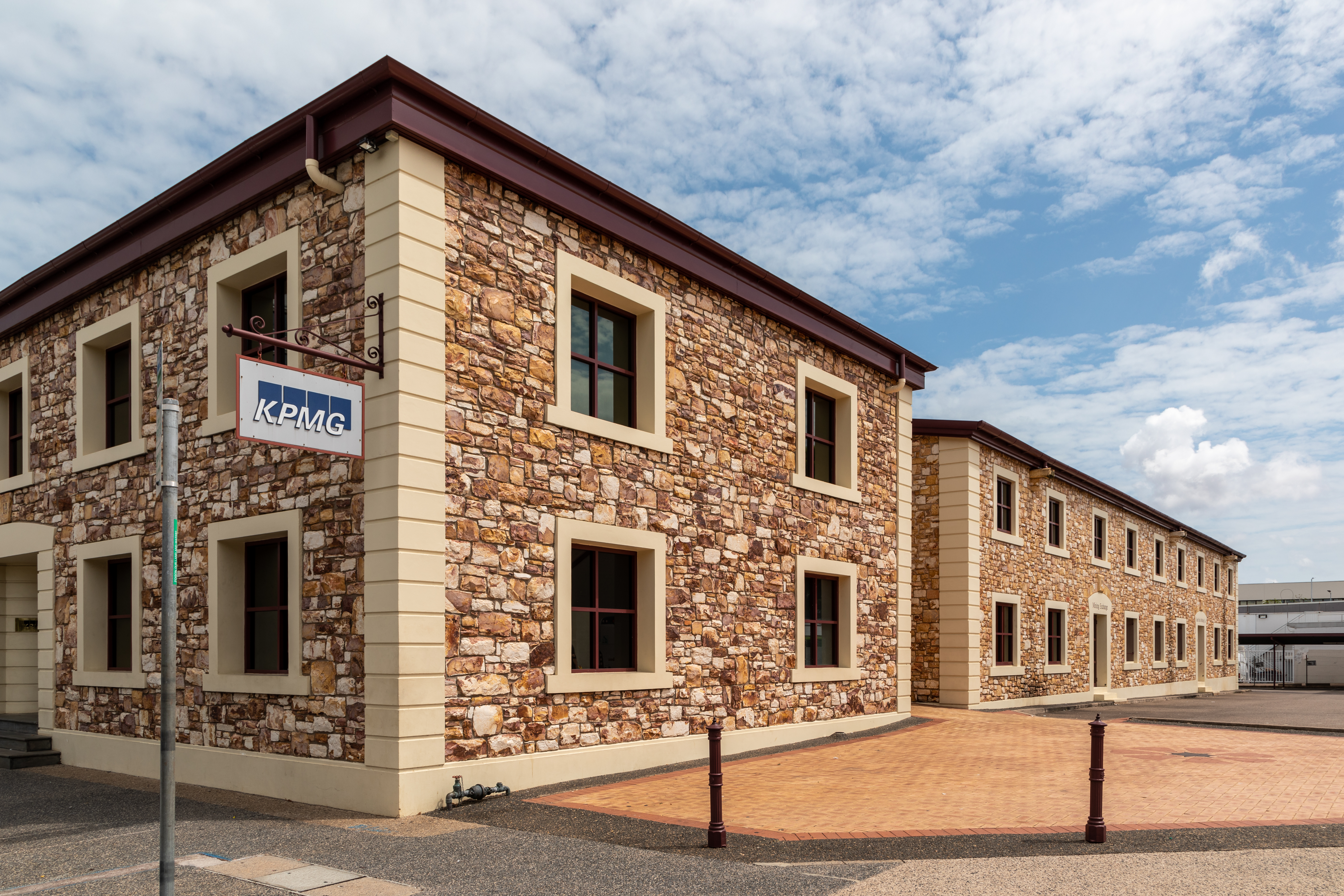
18 Smith Street, constructed in the late 19th century

As Darwin was destroyed by cyclones several times and suffered severe bomb damage during World War II, few historic buildings remain in town. The Administrator's Office dating from 1883 was used as a law court and as a police station and was only slightly damaged by bombs, but in 1974, the cyclone completely destroyed it. In 1979, it was decided to rebuild, and the reconstruction was finished in 1981. The building houses government offices today. Opposite the building, Survivors Lookout offers a view of the marina.

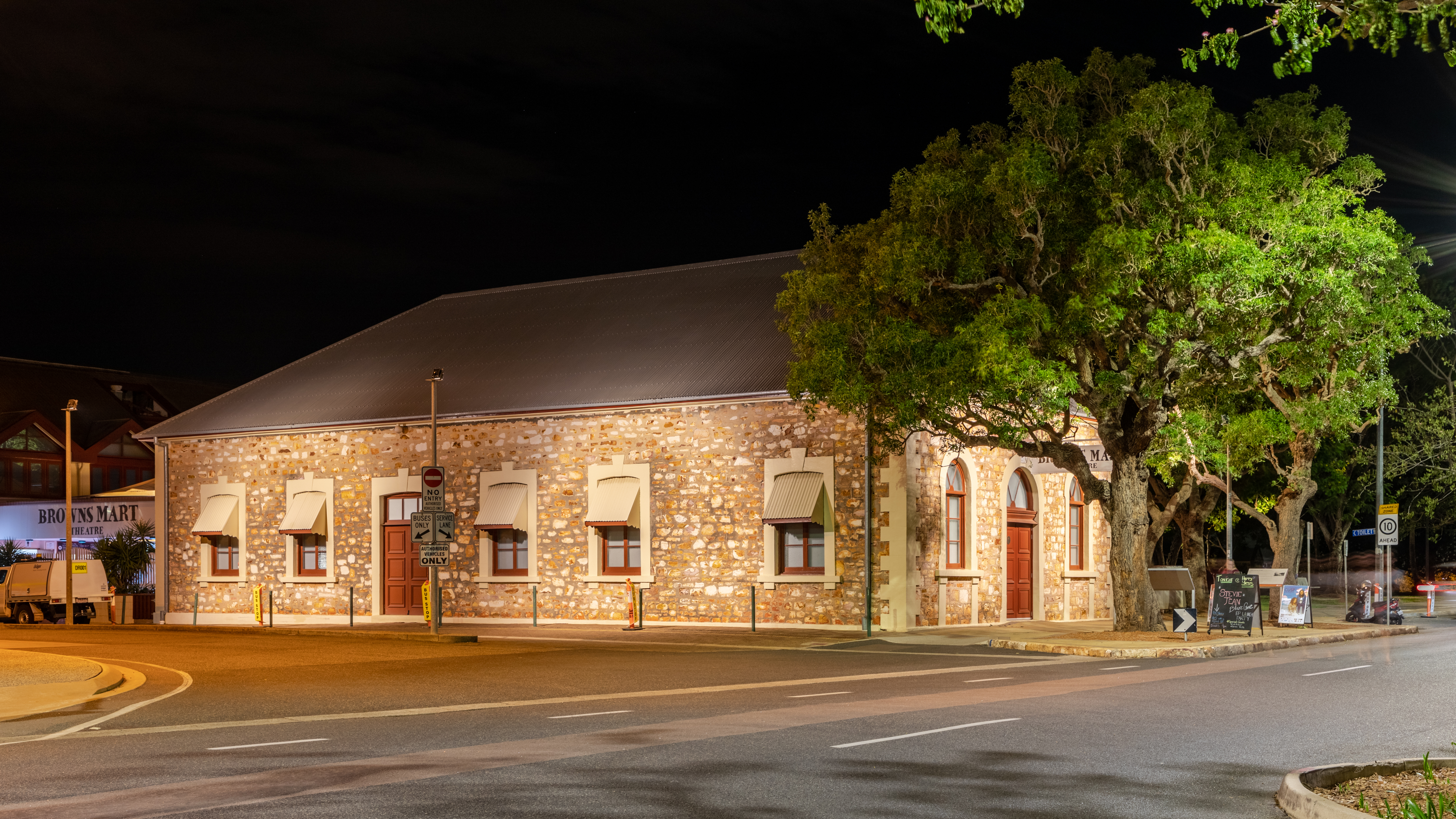
Brown's Mart

In a park in the south of the CBD, the ruin of the Town Hall built in 1883 and destroyed by the cyclone in 1974 can be seen. Browns Mart is a stone building dating from 1880 opposite the park. Browns Mart was originally used in many different activities including commerce, storage, shipping and insurance agency, mining exchange and meetings of local organisations but it was transformed into a theatre.

One of Darwin's most prominent buildings is the Chinese Temple, which was founded in 1887 and damaged by cyclones in 1897 and in 1937. It was severely damaged by bombs in 1942 and rebuilt after the war. On 24 December 1974 the cyclone completely destroyed it. Reconstruction was completed in 1978.

There are modern churches in Darwin. St Mary's Star of the Sea Roman Catholic Cathedral was inaugurated in 1962. Christ Church Anglican Cathedral was rebuilt in 1977 after being severely damaged by bombs in 1942 and destroyed by Cyclone Tracy in 1974. The Uniting Memorial Church was built in 1960.

== Events and festivals ==
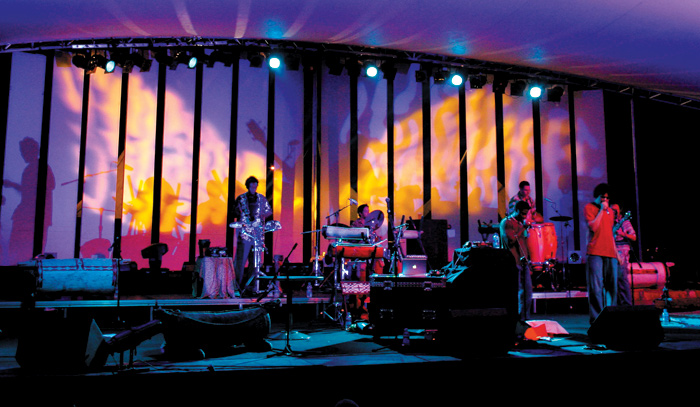
Darwin Festival

- The annual Darwin Fringe Festival runs for 10 days each July as an open-access festival.
- The Darwin Festival occurs each August, and includes comedy, dance, theatre, music, film and visual art, and the NT Indigenous Music Awards.
- The Nightcliff Seabreeze Festival, which started in 2005, is held on the second week of May in the suburb of Nightcliff. It showcases local talent, and a popular event is Saturday family festivities along the Nightcliff foreshore, one of Darwin's most popular fitness tracks.
- The Darwin beer-can regatta, held in August, celebrates Darwin resident's enjoyment of beer, and contestants race boats made of beer cans.
- The Darwin Cup horse race and the rodeo and Mud Crab Tying Competition are held each August.
- The World Solar Challenge race attracts teams from around the world, most fielded by universities or corporations and some by high schools. The race has a 20-year history spanning nine races, with the inaugural event taking place in 1987.
- The Royal Darwin Show is held annually in July at the Darwin Showgrounds. Exhibitions include agriculture and livestock, and horse events. Entertainment and sideshows are also included over the three days of the event.
- The Darwin Street Art Festival is an annual event in September where street artists from around the world create large outdoor murals.
- A yearly music festival, BASSINTHEGRASS, has been held since 2003. Since 2019 it has been held at Mindil Beach.
- On 1 July, Territorians celebrate Territory Day. This is the only day of the year, apart from the Chinese New Year and New Year's Eve, that fireworks are permitted. In Darwin, the main celebrations occur at Mindil Beach, where the government commissions a large firework display.
- Other festivals include the Glenti, which showcases Darwin's large Greek community, and India@Mindil, a similar festival held by the city's Indian community. The Chinese New Year is also celebrated with great festivity, highlighting the East Asian influence in Darwin.

== Arts and culture ==
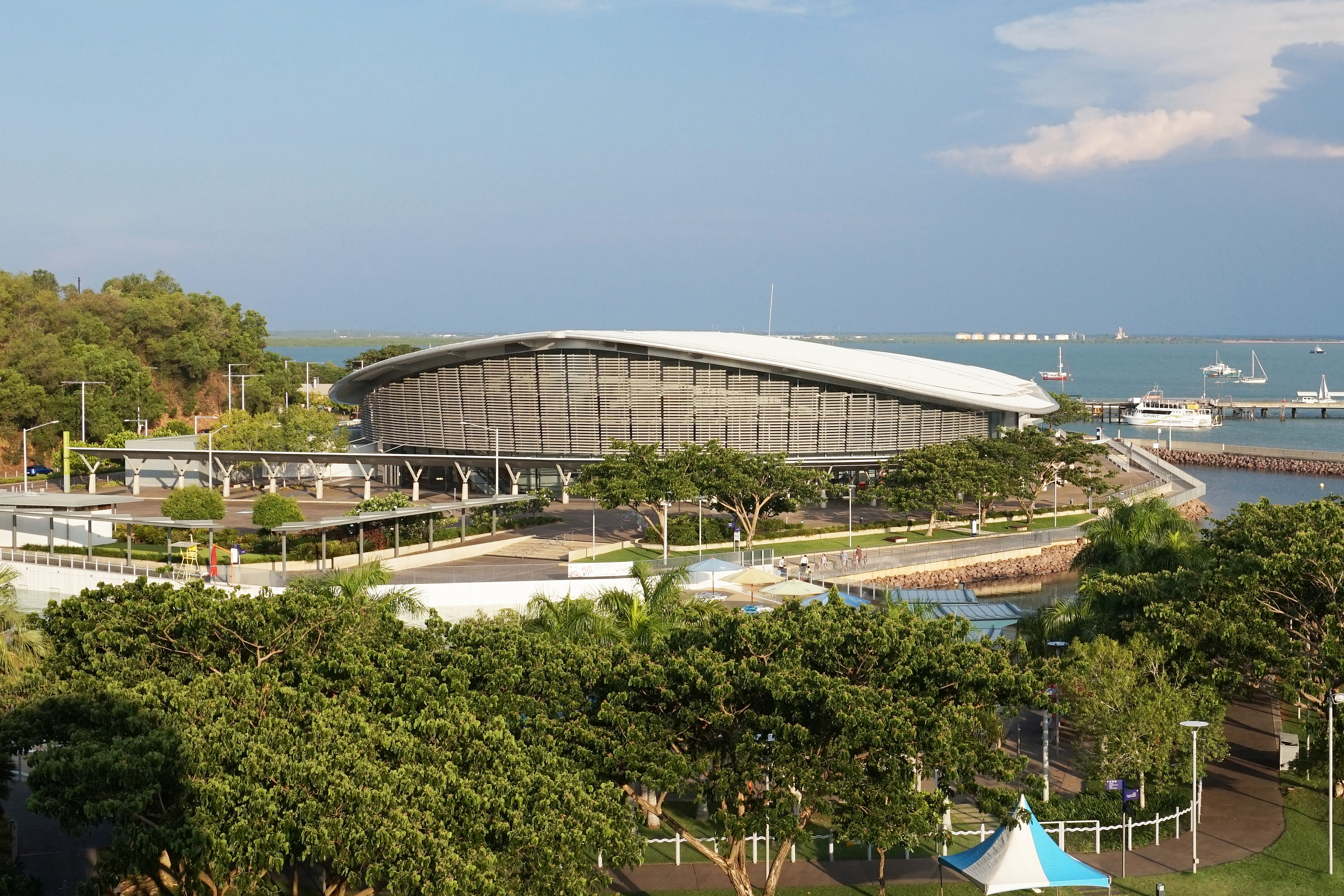
Darwin Convention Centre

The Darwin Symphony Orchestra was assembled in 1989 and has performed throughout the Territory. The Darwin Theatre Company is a locally produced professional theatre production company, performing locally and nationally.

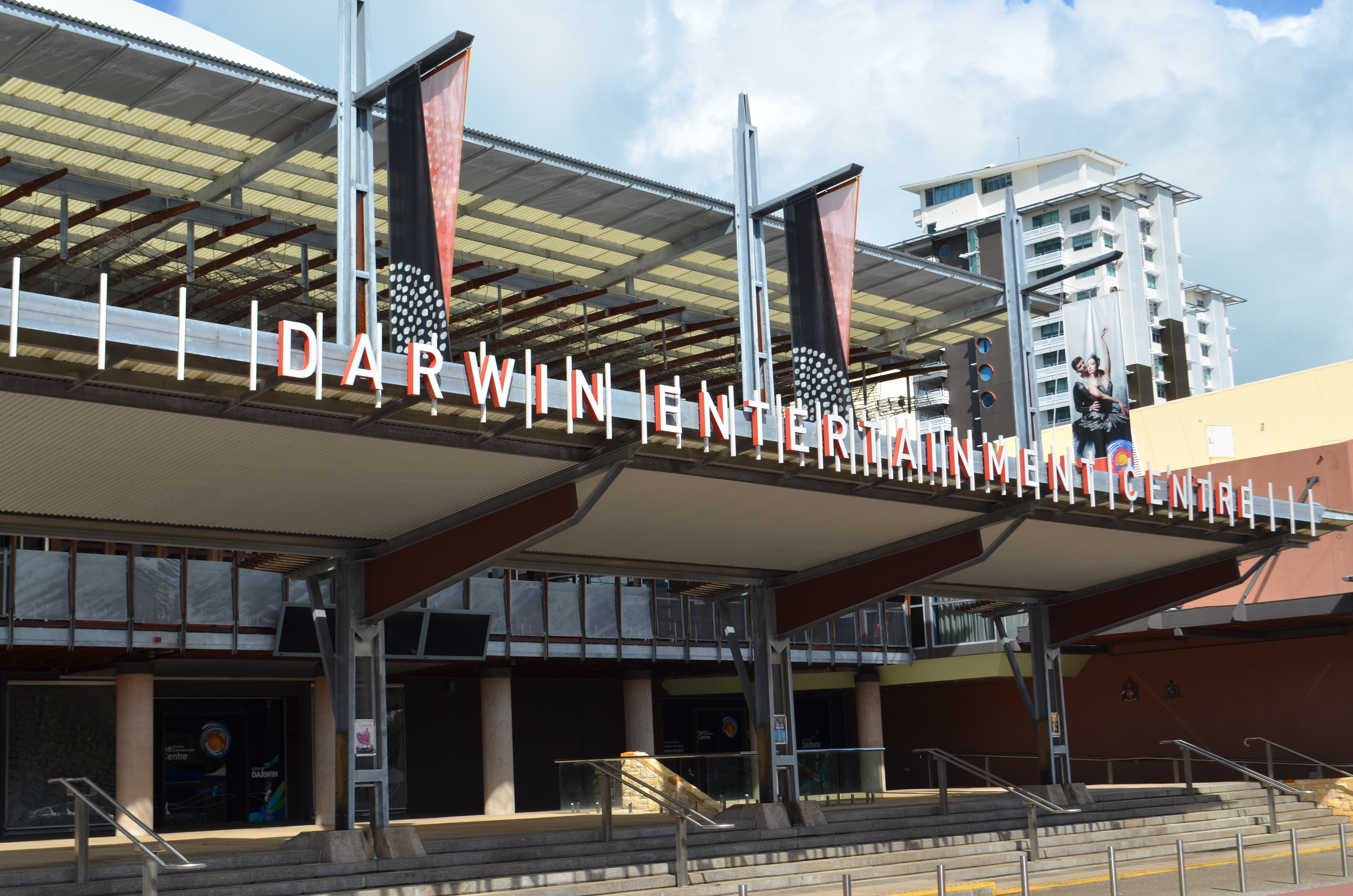
Darwin Entertainment Centre

The Darwin Entertainment Centre is the city's main concert venue and hosts theatre and orchestral performances. Other theatres include the Darwin Convention Centre, which opened in July 2008. The Darwin Convention Centre is part of the $1.1 billion Darwin Waterfront project.

The Northern Territory Museum and Art Gallery (MAGNT) in Darwin gives an overview of the history of the area, including exhibits on Cyclone Tracy and the boats of the Pacific Islands. The MAGNT also organises the annual Telstra National Aboriginal and Torres Strait Islander Art Award, the longest-running Indigenous art award in Australia. The MAGNT also manages the Defence of Darwin Experience, a multi-media installation that tells the story of the Japanese air raids on Darwin during World War II.

The NT Dance Company is led by choreographer Gary Lang, who has been artistic director since 2012. Lang previously taught at many leading dance companies, including Bangarra Dance Theatre, after studying dance at NAISDA in Sydney and working as a dancer for years. The company has a strong focus on culture, and also works with disadvantaged young Indigenous people.

Local and visiting bands can be heard at venues including the Darwin Entertainment Centre, The Vic Hotel, Happy Yess, and Brown's Mart. Artists such as Jessica Mauboy and The Groovesmiths call Darwin home.

The multiculturalism of Darwin has helped make Southeast Asian noodle broth laksa the city's favourite meal. This has also been demonstrated through the Darwin International Laksa Festival, an annual competition where during the month of October participants register and try different laksa vendors within the Northern Territory.

== Other entertainment ==
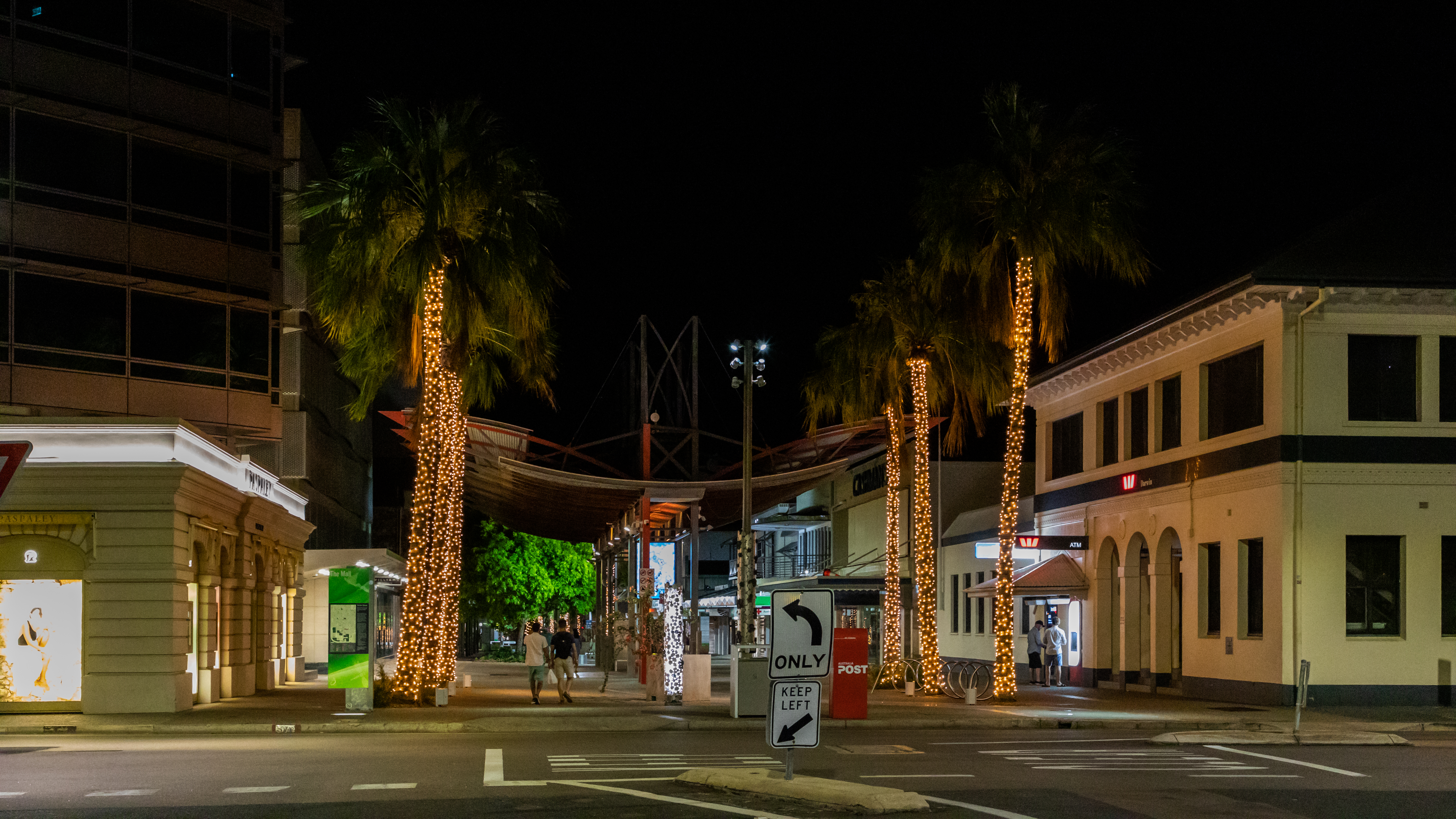
Smith Street Mall is a major retail precinct

Weekly markets include the popular Mindil Beach Sunset Market (Thursdays and Sundays during the dry season); Parap Market; Nightcliff Market; and Rapid Creek market.

Darwin's only casino opened in 1979 as the Don Casino, operating out of the Don Hotel on Cavenagh Street. The present site of the hotel and casino on Darwin's Mindil Beach opened in 1983, at which point gambling operations ceased at the Don Hotel and resumed at the newly built facilities. The new hotel and casino was named Mindil Beach Casino until 1985, when the name changed to the Diamond Beach Hotel Casino. Upon its acquisition by MGM Grand the hotel was rebranded as the MGM Grand Darwin, before it changed to Skycity Darwin after Skycity Entertainment Group purchased the hotel in 2004.

Mitchell Street in the central business district is lined with nightclubs, takeaways, and restaurants. This is the city's entertainment hub. There are several smaller theatres, two indoor cinema complexes, one at Casuarina and one at Palmerston. Darwin City hosts The Deckchair Cinema, an open-air cinema operates through the dry season, from April to October, screening independent and arthouse films.

== Recreation ==
=== Beaches ===
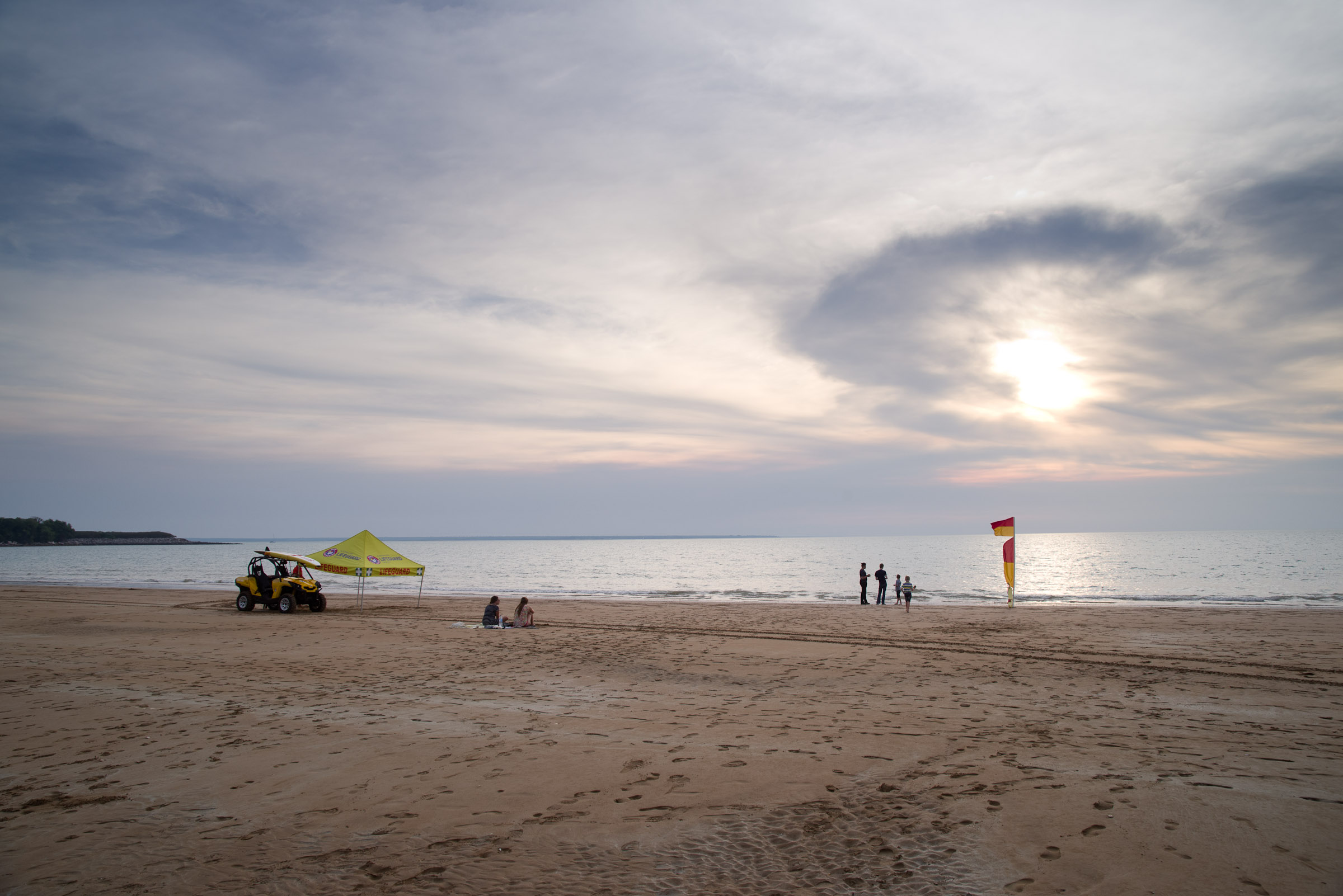
Mindil Beach

During the months of October–May the sea contains deadly box jellyfish, known locally as stingers or sea wasps. Saltwater crocodiles are common in all waterways surrounding Darwin and are occasionally found in Darwin Harbour and on local beaches. An active trapping program is carried out by the NT Government to limit numbers of crocodiles within the Darwin urban waterway area.

Darwin has many kilometres of beaches, including the Casuarina Beach and renowned Mindil Beach, home of the Mindil Beach markets. Darwin City Council has designated an area of Casuarina Beach as a free beach, which has been designated as a nudist beach area since 1976.

Bundilla Beach was formerly named Vesteys Beach, as it was one of the beaches overlooked by Vestey's Meatworks, which existed from 1914 to 1920 and was involved in the Darwin rebellion. In March 2021, the beach was renamed Bundilla Beach, the name by which it had long been known to the traditional owners, the Larrakia people.

The Darwin Surf Life Saving Club operates longboats and surf skis and provides events and lifesaving accreditations.

Lake Alexander is an artificial lake at East Point Reserve, suitable for swimming and water sports throughout the year.

=== Fishing ===
Fishing is a popular recreation among Darwin locals. Visitors fish for the barramundi, an iconic fish in the region. This fish thrives in the Daly River, Moyle River, Roper River, Anson Bay, Mary River, and South and East Alligator River.

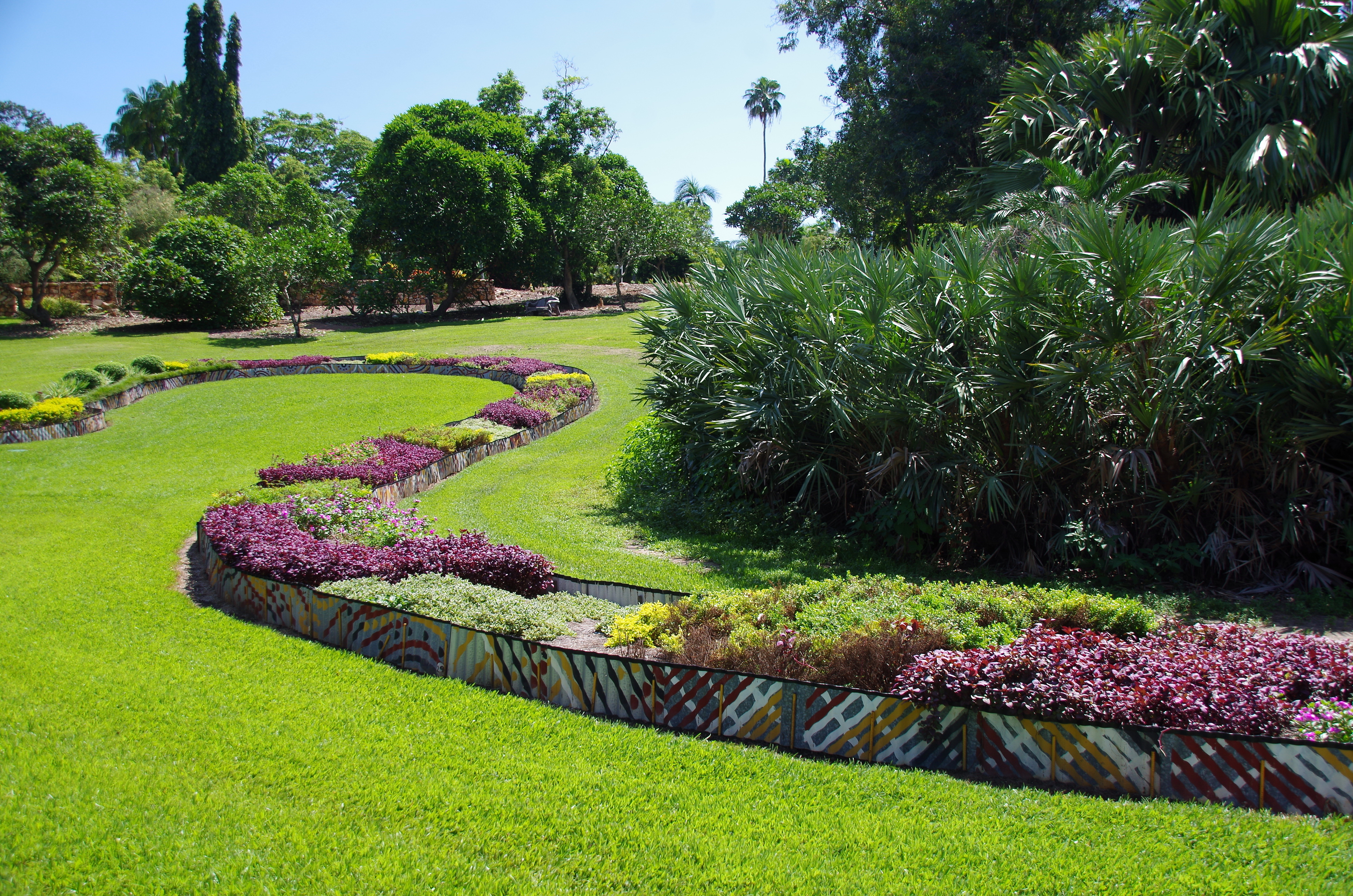
George Brown Darwin Botanic Gardens

Blue-water fishing is also available off the coast of Darwin; Spanish mackerel, black jewfish, queenfish, and snapper are found in the area.

=== Parks and gardens ===
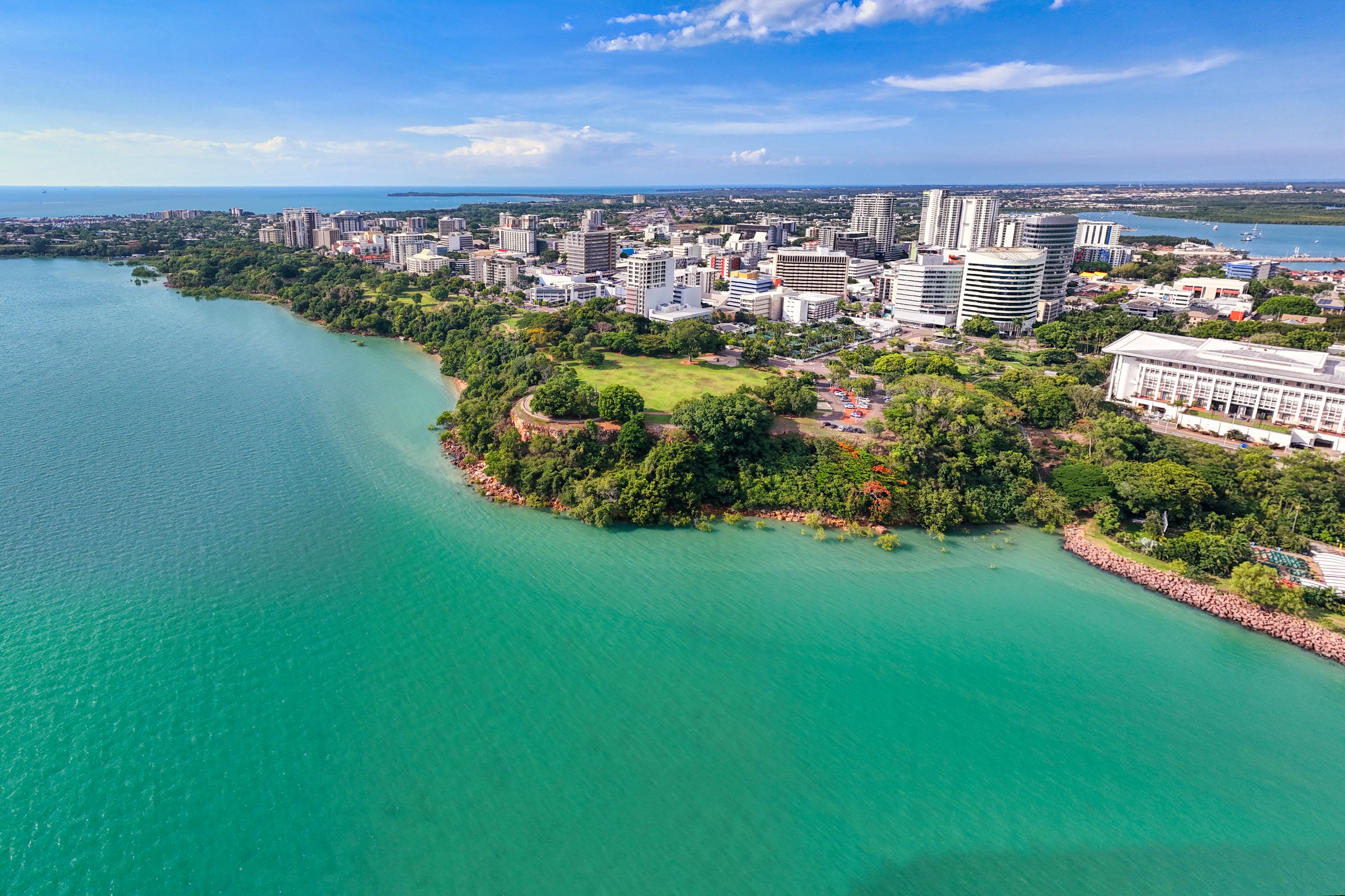
Bicentennial Park (Darwin)

Darwin has extensive parks and gardens. These include the George Brown Darwin Botanic Gardens, East Point Reserve, Casuarina Coastal Reserve, Charles Darwin National Park, Knuckey Lagoons Conservation Reserve, Leanyer Recreation Park, the Nightcliff Foreshore, Bicentennial Park and the Jingili Water Gardens.

=== Wildlife ===
Darwin is a popular bird-watching site, with locations such as the George Brown Darwin Botanic Gardens, East Point Reserve, Buffalo Creek, Leanyer Ponds, and Knuckey Lagoon. Slightly further from the city is one of the best birding sites in the country, Fogg Dam Conservation Reserve.

Some species of native mammals are more abundant in Darwin than in the surrounding native forest and woodland ecosystems of the region, including the common brushtail possum and black-footed tree-rat. This is likely due to the presence of well-watered gardens and parks, the absence of frequent fires, and the availability of denning sites such as the roofs of houses.

Darwin is home to many species of frogs and reptiles. There are more species of snake in Darwin than any other Australian capital city, with 34 non-marine snake species found in the region, of which 23 have been recorded by professional snake catchers in Darwin itself. A far smaller proportion of these snakes are highly venomous than is typically found in other cities, due to the low numbers of front-fanged elapid species and dominance of relatively harmless pythons and colubrid species.

Of the 23 more regularly encountered snake species in Darwin, species with broader habitat and dietary preferences, as well as a penchant for arboreality, are associated with more frequent human–snake interactions. Shifts in snake behaviour and movement occurs throughout the year, with species specific differences in abundance and occurrence in certain months.

== Sports ==
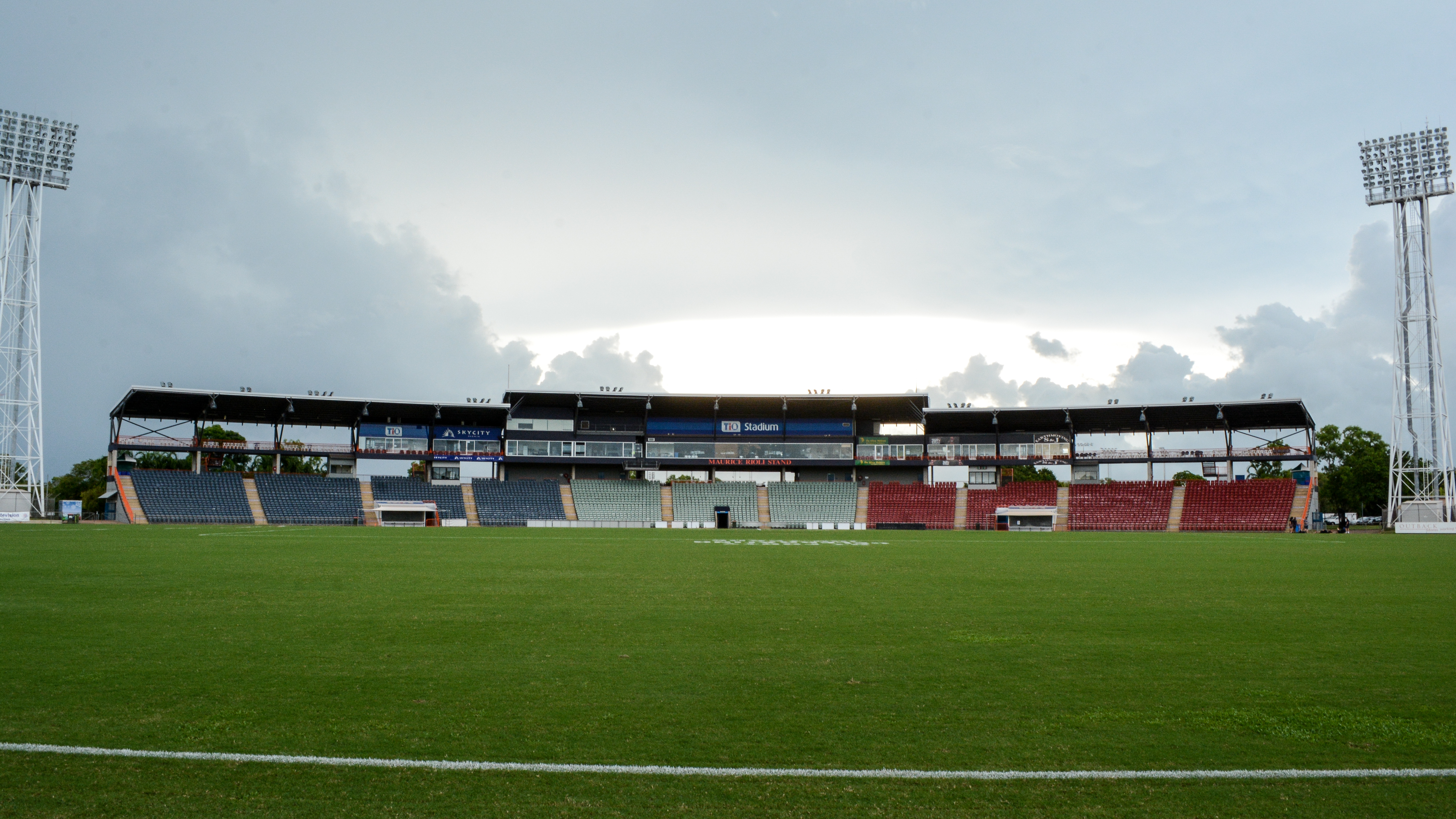
Marrara Oval, the largest sports stadium in the Northern Territory

The Marrara Sports Complex near the airport has stadiums for Australian rules (TIO Stadium), cricket, rugby league, football, basketball (and indoor court sports), athletics and field hockey. Every two years since 1991 (excluding 2003 due to the SARS outbreak), Darwin has hosted the Arafura Games, a major regional sporting event. In July 2003, Darwin hosted its first international test cricket match between Australia and Bangladesh, followed by Australia and Sri Lanka in 2004.

Australian rules is played all year round and the Territory's premier league competition, the Northern Territory Football League is based in Darwin. Australian Football League clubs generally sell a handful of games to the Northern Territory each year, some of which are played at Marrara Oval. Darwin is part of a bid for a Northern Territory AFL license for proposed entry into the competition by 2028 at the earliest. The Darwin-based Indigenous All-Stars have participated in the AFL pre-season competition. In 2003, a record crowd of 17,500 attended a pre-season game between the All-Stars and Carlton Football Club at Marrara.

Rugby League and Rugby Union club competitions are played in Darwin each year, organised by the NTRL and NTRU respectively. The Darwin Hottest Sevens in the World tournament is hosted in Darwin each January, with Rugby Sevens club teams from countries including Australia, New Zealand, Papua New Guinea, Malaysia, and Singapore competing. Darwin's Hottest 7s is the richest Rugby 7s tournament in the Southern Hemisphere.

Darwin hosts a round of the Supercars Championship every year, bringing thousands of motorsports fans to the Hidden Valley Raceway. Also in Hidden Valley, adjacent to the road-racing circuit, is Darwin's dirt track racing venue, Northline Speedway. The speedway has hosted a number of Australian Championships over the years for different categories including Sprintcars, Speedcars, and Super Sedans. The motocross tracks in Hidden Valley have hosted the final round of the 2025 FIM Motocross World Championship.

The Darwin Cup culminating on the first Monday of August is a popular horse race event for Darwin and draws large crowds every year to Fannie Bay Racecourse. While it is not as popular as the Melbourne Cup, it does draw a crowd and, in 2003, Sky Racing began televising most of the races. The Darwin Cup day is a public holiday for the Northern Territory, Picnic Day public holiday.

There is one greyhound racing track in Darwin at Winnellie Park on Hook Road. It is the only track in the Northern Territory.

In 2022, the Darwin Salties basketball club debuted in the Queensland-based NBL1 North competition, making the NBL1 the first Australian sport league to have clubs based in and playing out of every state and territory in Australia. However the team withdrew in 2024 due to financial difficulties.

Active sports teams in Darwin
Club	League	Sport	Venue	Established
Banks Football Club	NTFL	Australian rules football	Gardens Oval	1978
Darwin Football Club	NTFL	Australian rules football	TIO Stadium	1916
Nightcliff Football Club	NTFL	Australian rules football	Nightcliff Oval	1950
Northern Territory rugby league team	Affiliated States Championship	Rugby League	Territory Rugby League Stadium	1950
Northern Territory Rugby Union Team	Australian Rugby Shield	Rugby Union	Territory Rugby League Stadium	1970
NT Thunder Academy	Talent League Boys/Talent League Girls	Australian rules football	TIO Stadium	1979
Palmerston Football Club	NTFL	Australian rules football	Cazaly's Oval	1970
PINT Football Club	NTFL	Australian rules football	Marrara Cricket Ground	1981
Southern Districts Football Club	NTFL	Australian rules football	Norbuilt Oval	1981
St Mary's Football Club	NTFL	Australian rules football	TIO Stadium	1952
Tracy Village Football Club	NTFL	Australian rules football	Tracy Village Oval	1978
Territory Storm	Australian Netball Championships	Netball	Territory Netball Stadium	2008
Wanderers Football Club	NTFL	Australian rules football	TIO Stadium	1916
Waratah Football Club	NTFL	Australian rules football	Gardens Oval	1916

== Media ==
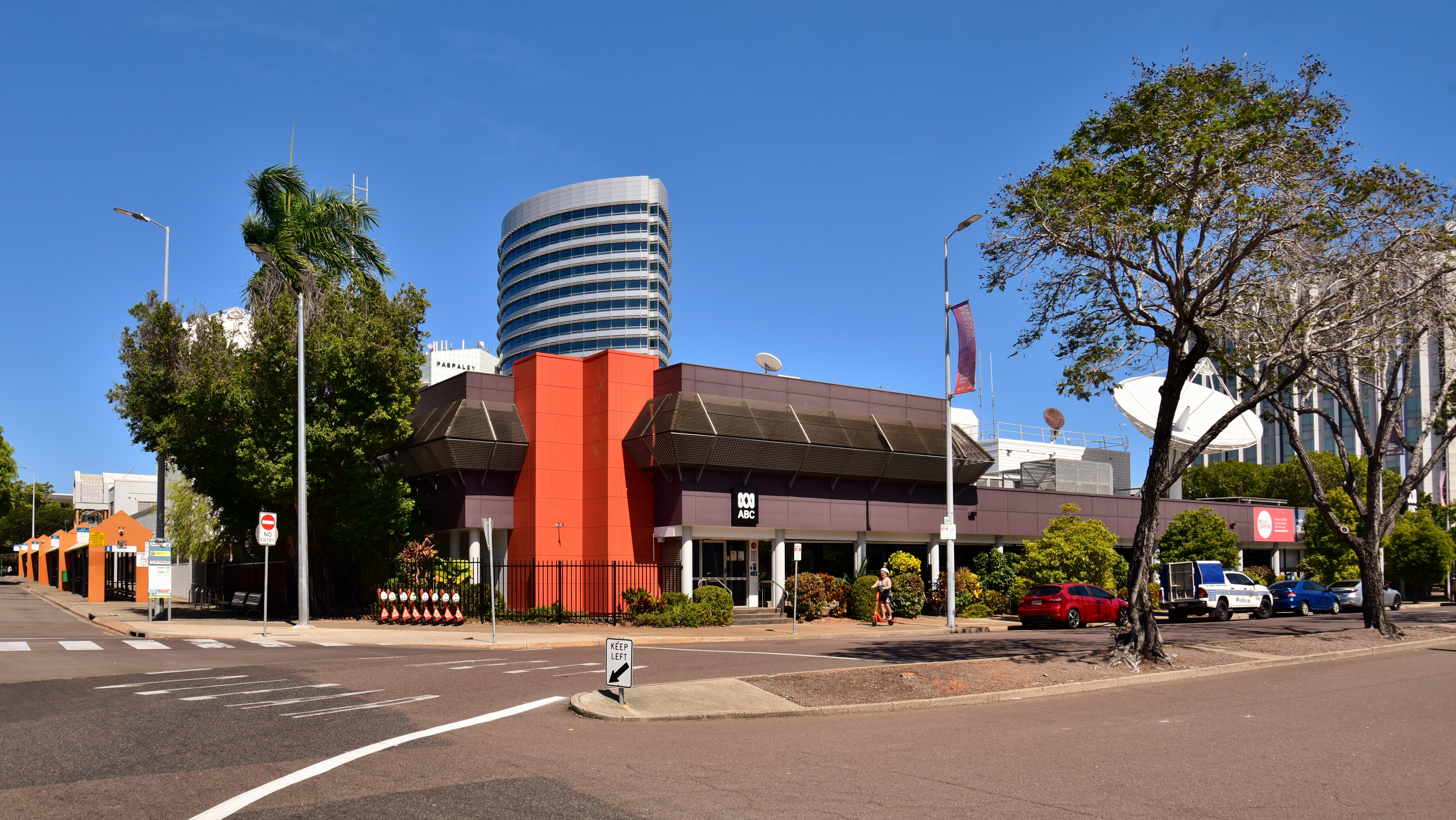
ABC Darwin studios and headquarters

Darwin's major newspapers are the Northern Territory News (Monday–Saturday), The Sunday Territorian (Sunday), and the national daily, The Australian (Monday–Friday) and The Weekend Australian (Saturday), all published by News Corp. Free weekly community newspapers include Sun Newspapers (delivered in Darwin, Palmerston and Litchfield), and published by the NT News. Another newspaper, the Centralian Advocate (1947–present), is printed in Darwin and trucked to Alice Springs.

Former publications in (or connected to) Darwin include:

- Moonta Herald and Northern Territory Gazette (1869)
- Northern Territory Times and Gazette (1873–1927)
- The North Australian (1883–1889)
- The North Australian and Northern Territory Government Gazette (1889–1890)
- The Northern Territory Times (1927–1932)
- The Northern Standard (c.1929–1942)
- Army News (1941–1946) – for the troops stationed in Darwin
- The Darwin Sun (1981–1982) – a community newsletter

Five free-to-air channels service Darwin. Commercial television channels are provided by Seven Darwin (Seven Network owned and operated station), Nine Darwin (formerly branded as Channel 8) and 10 Darwin (Network 10 relay), which launched in April 2008. The two government-owned national broadcast services in Darwin are the ABC and SBS. Subscription television services Foxtel via Cable and Fetch TV via IPTV are available in the Darwin/Palmerston/Litchfield areas.

Darwin no longer hosts a commercial news broadcast, with Channel 9 concluding the service in 2024.

Darwin has radio stations on AM and FM frequencies, as well as on DAB+ (digital radio). ABC stations include ABC Local Radio (105.7 FM), ABC Radio National (657 AM), ABC News Radio (102.5 FM), ABC Classic (107.3 FM) and Triple J (103.3 FM). SBS Radio (100.9 FM) also broadcasts its national radio network to Darwin. There are three commercial radio stations, Hot 100, Mix 104.9 and Top Country 92.3. Other stations in Darwin include university-based station Territory FM 104.1, dance music station KIK FM 91.5, Palmerston FM 88.0 and Niche Radio 87.6

Non-English stations include Arabic-language channel 2ME 1638 AM, Chinese-language channel 2CR 1701 AM, Greek-language channel 2MM 1656AM, Italian-language channel Rete Italia 1476 AM and Spanish-language channel Radio Austral 90.7 FM. Indigenous community-based stations Radio Larrakia 94.5 FM and Radio Yolngu 1530 AM. The two sports stations TAB Radio 1242 AM and SEN 1611 AM. Local Christian stations are Faith 88.4 FM, Rhema 97.7 FM and Vision Radio 1323 AM.

== Transport ==
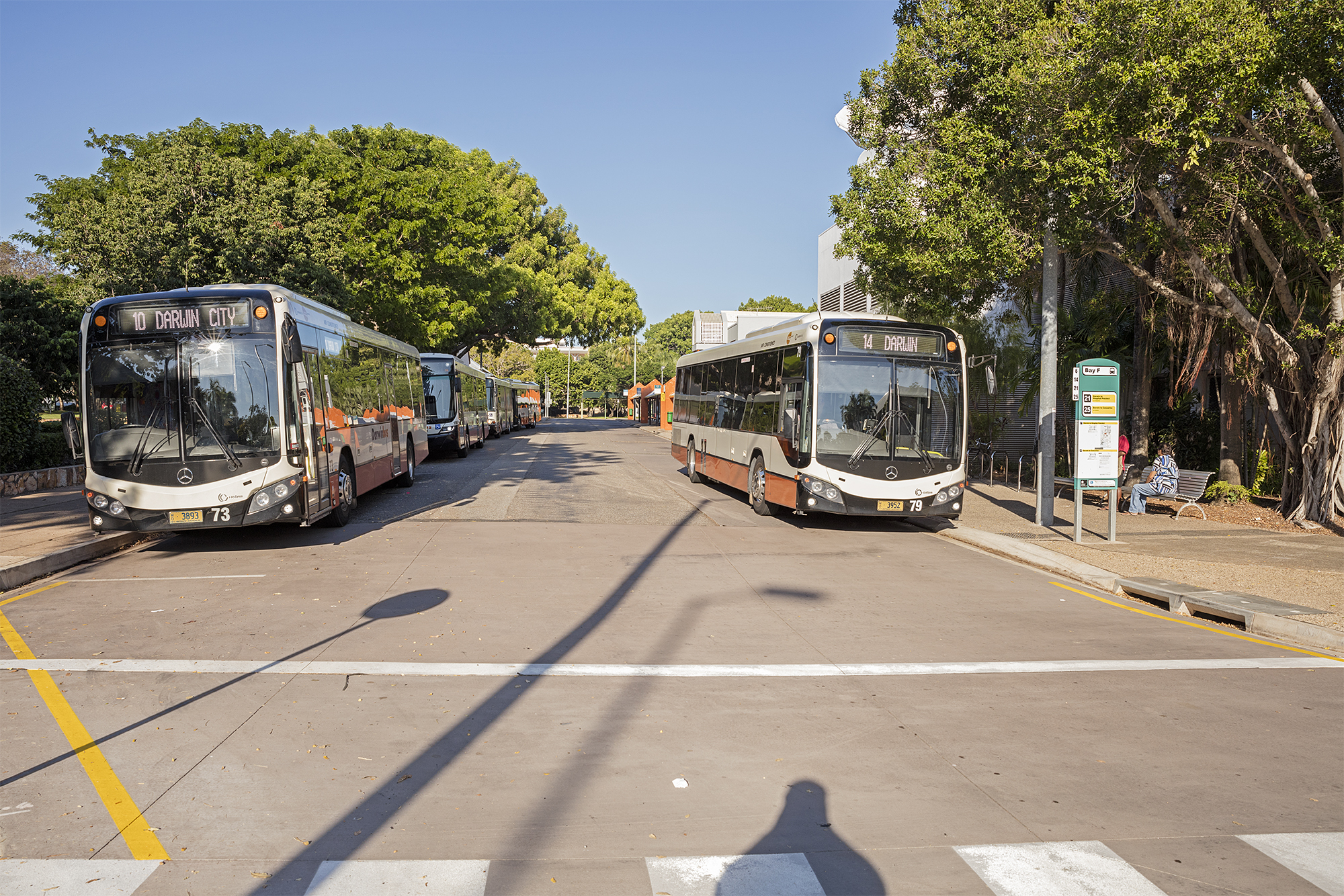
Buses in Darwin

The Territory's public transport services are managed by the Department of Lands and Planning, Public Transport Division. Darwin has a bus network serviced by a range of contracted bus operators, which provides transport to the main suburbs of Darwin.

Darwin has no commuter rail system, but long-distance passenger rail services do operate out of the city. The Alice Springs-Darwin railway line was completed in 2003, linking Darwin to Adelaide. The first service ran in 2004. The Ghan passenger train service between Adelaide and Darwin railway station via Alice Springs and Katherine runs once per week in each direction, with some exceptions.

Preceding station	Journey Beyond	Following station
Terminus	The Ghan	Katherine towards Adelaide

Historically, the North Australia Railway carried passengers and freight from Darwin into the interior, reaching Pine Creek in 1889, Katherine in 1917, and Birdum in 1929. It was closed due to declining traffic in 1976.

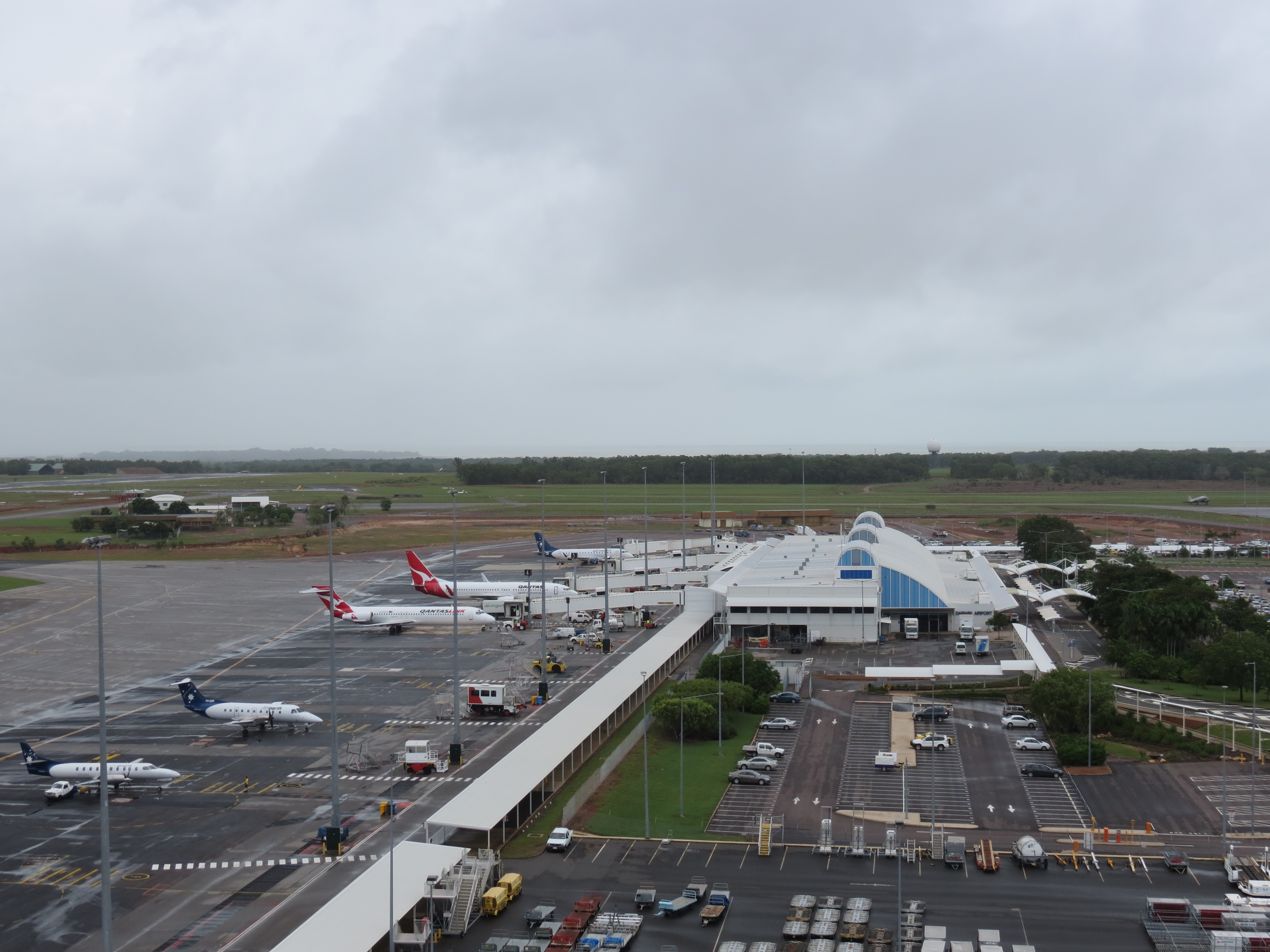
Aircraft at Darwin International Airport

Darwin International Airport, in the suburb of Eaton, is Darwin's only airport, which shares its runways with the Royal Australian Air Force's RAAF Base Darwin.

Darwin can be reached via the Stuart Highway, which runs the length of the Northern Territory from Darwin through Katherine, Tennant Creek, Alice Springs, and on to Adelaide. Other major roads in Darwin include Tiger Brennan Drive, Amy Johnson Avenue, Dick Ward Drive, Bagot Road, Trower Road, and McMillans Road. Bus service in the greater Darwin area is provided by Darwinbus.

=== Port ===
Ferries leave from Port Darwin to island locations, mainly for tourists. A ferry service to the Tiwi Islands, the Arafura Pearl, operates from Cullen Bay.

Darwin has a deepwater port, East Arm Wharf, which opened in 2000. It has 754 metres (2,474 ft) of wharf line and is capable of handling Panamax-sized ships of a maximum length of 274 metres (899 ft) and a DWT of up to 80,000 tonnes (88,000 short tons).

== Infrastructure ==
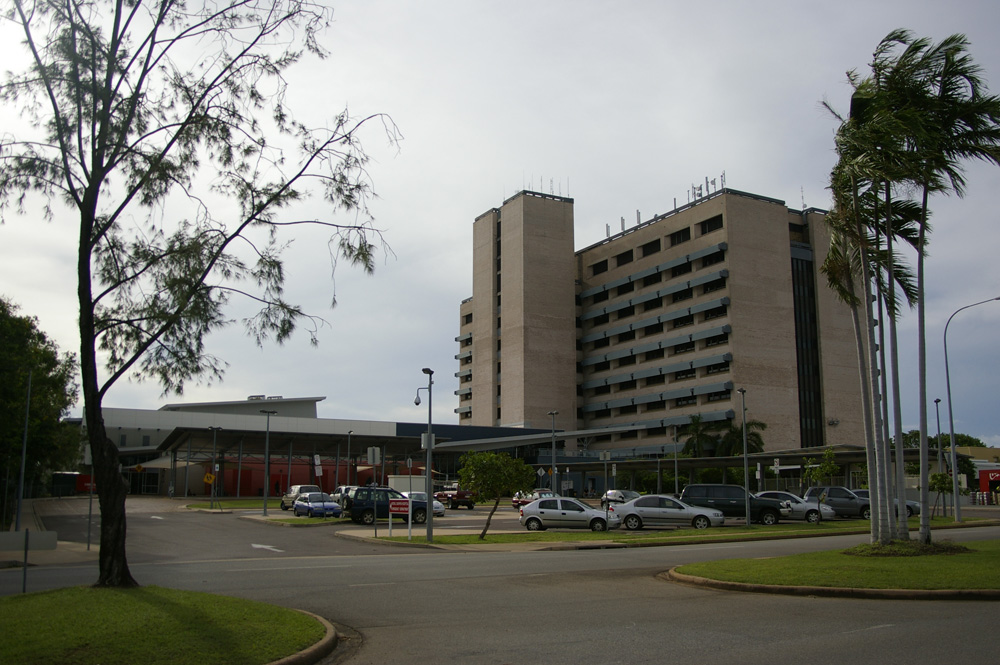
Royal Darwin Hospital

=== Health ===
The Government of the Northern Territory Department of Health and Families oversees one public hospital in the Darwin metropolitan region. The Royal Darwin Hospital, in Tiwi, is the city's major teaching and referral hospital, and the largest in the Northern Territory.

There is one major private hospital, Darwin Private Hospital, in Tiwi, adjacent to the Royal Darwin Hospital. Darwin Private Hospital is operated and owned by Healthscope Ltd, a private hospital corporation.

In August 2018, Palmerston Regional Hospital was opened to help ease the pressure of patient numbers at the Royal Darwin Hospital.

=== Utilities ===
Water storage, supply and power for Darwin is managed by PowerWater. The corporation is also responsible for management of sewage and the major water catchments in the region. Water is mainly stored in the largest dam, The Darwin River Dam, which holds up to 90% of Darwin's water supply. For many years, Darwin's principal water supply came from Manton Dam.

Darwin and its suburbs, Palmerston and Katherine, are powered by the Channel Island Power Station, the Northern Territory's largest power plant, and the Weddell Power Station.

=== Telecommunications ===
Darwin once had Australia's only international connection to the outside world in the form of an overseas telegraph cable, connecting Darwin to Java. The southern section of the cable connected Darwin with Adelaide and was known as the overland telegraph line. In 2022, the Northern Territory Government announced that an international undersea cable system would land into Darwin, directly connecting it to Indonesia, Singapore, the United States and Timor Leste. The new cable system, representing an investment of $700 million, is expected to create a new digital economy as it is coupled with recent announcements on Data Centre Investment into Darwin. The plans for Darwin for Data Centres and International cables are outlined in the Northern Territory's Digital Strategy the Terabit Territory.

The Northern Territory Government announced in 2024 the Unite Cable System was awarded Major Project Status providing the project with major support. Unite will connect the Northern Territory to the southern states of Australia delivering a new hyperscale optical fibre network connecting many of the NT's locations and under pinning the Terabit Territory Digital Strategy.

In August 2024, NextDC announced their new Darwin Data Centre was open and ready for business. The company also announced it had partnered with Vocus ending its long standing market position of being a carrier independent data centre provider.

== See also ==
- List of films shot in Darwin
- List of mayors and lord mayors of Darwin
- List of people from Darwin
- Local government areas of the Northern Territory
- List of Darwin suburbs
