= List of Darwin suburbs =

This is a list of suburbs in and around Darwin, Northern Territory, Australia, sorted by alphabetical order.

All Darwin suburbs have postcodes beginning with 08.

== Inner city municipalities and their suburbs ==
=== Darwin ===
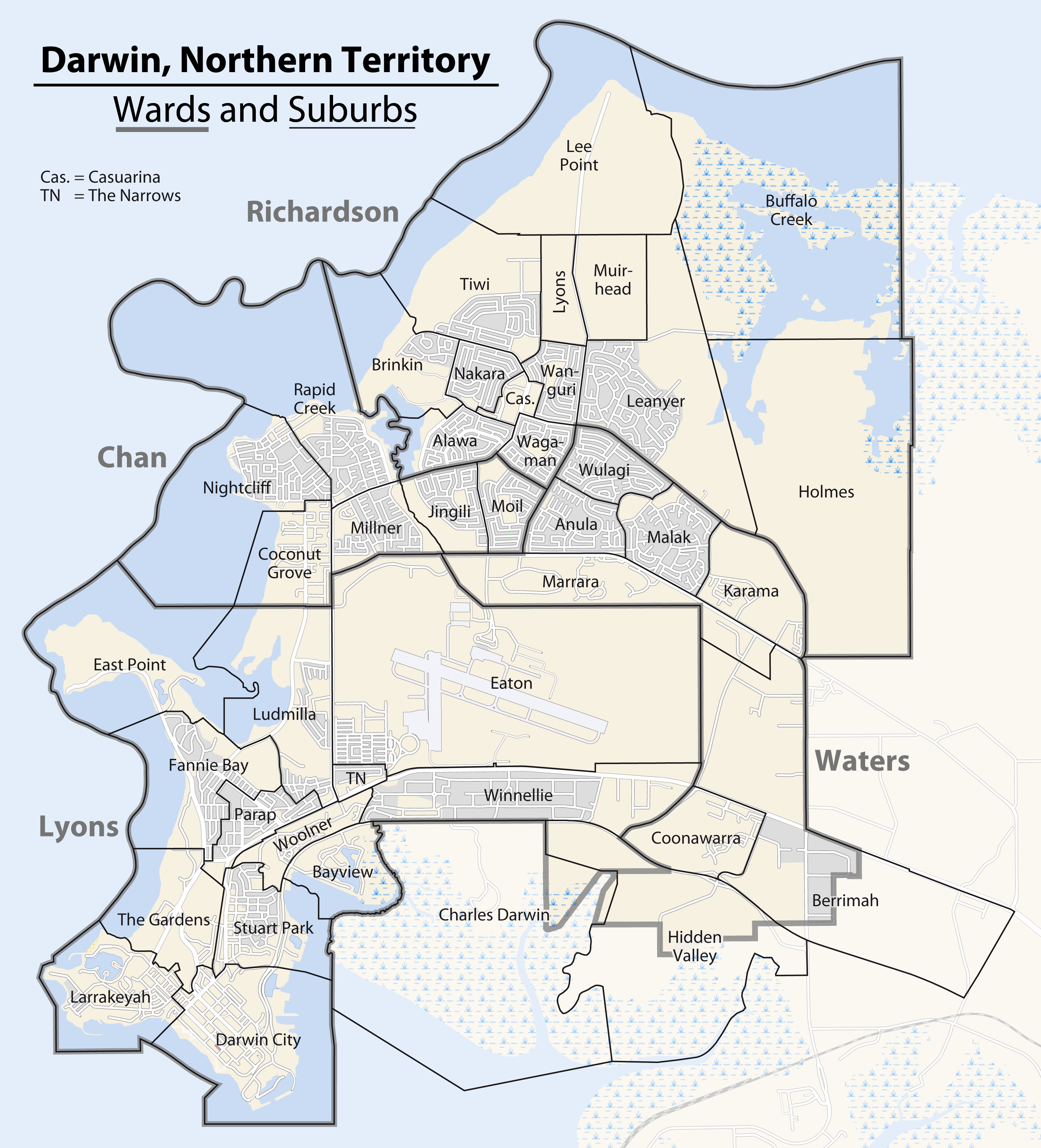
Map of City of Darwin with suburbs

Chan Ward	Lyons Ward	Richardson Ward	Waters Ward
Coconut Grove (0810); Jingili (0810); Millner (0810); Moil (0810); Nightcliff (0810); Rapid Creek (0810)	Bayview (0820); Charles Darwin (part); Darwin (part) (0800); Eaton; East Point (0820); Fannie Bay (0820); Hidden Valley (part) (0828); Larrakeyah (0820); Ludmilla (0820); Parap (0820); Stuart Park (0820); The Gardens (0820); The Narrows (0820); Winnellie (0820/0822); Woolner (0820)	Alawa (0810); Brinkin (part) (0810); Buffalo Creek; Casuarina (0810); Holmes; Leanyer (0810); Lee Point (0810); Lyons (0810); Muirhead (0810); Nakara (0810); Tiwi (0810); Wagaman (0810); Wanguri (0810)	Anula (0812); Berrimah (part)(0820); Coonawarra (0820); Karama (0812); Malak (with Sanderson) (0812); Marrara (with Northlakes) (0812); Sanderson (0812/0813); Wulagi (0812)

=== Unincorporated area associated with the East Arm of Darwin Harbour ===
- Berrimah (part)
- Charles Darwin (part)
- Darwin Harbour
- Darwin City (part)
- East Arm
- Elrundie
- Hidden Valley (part)
- Tivendale
- Wishart

== Outer municipalities and their suburbs ==
=== Palmerston ===
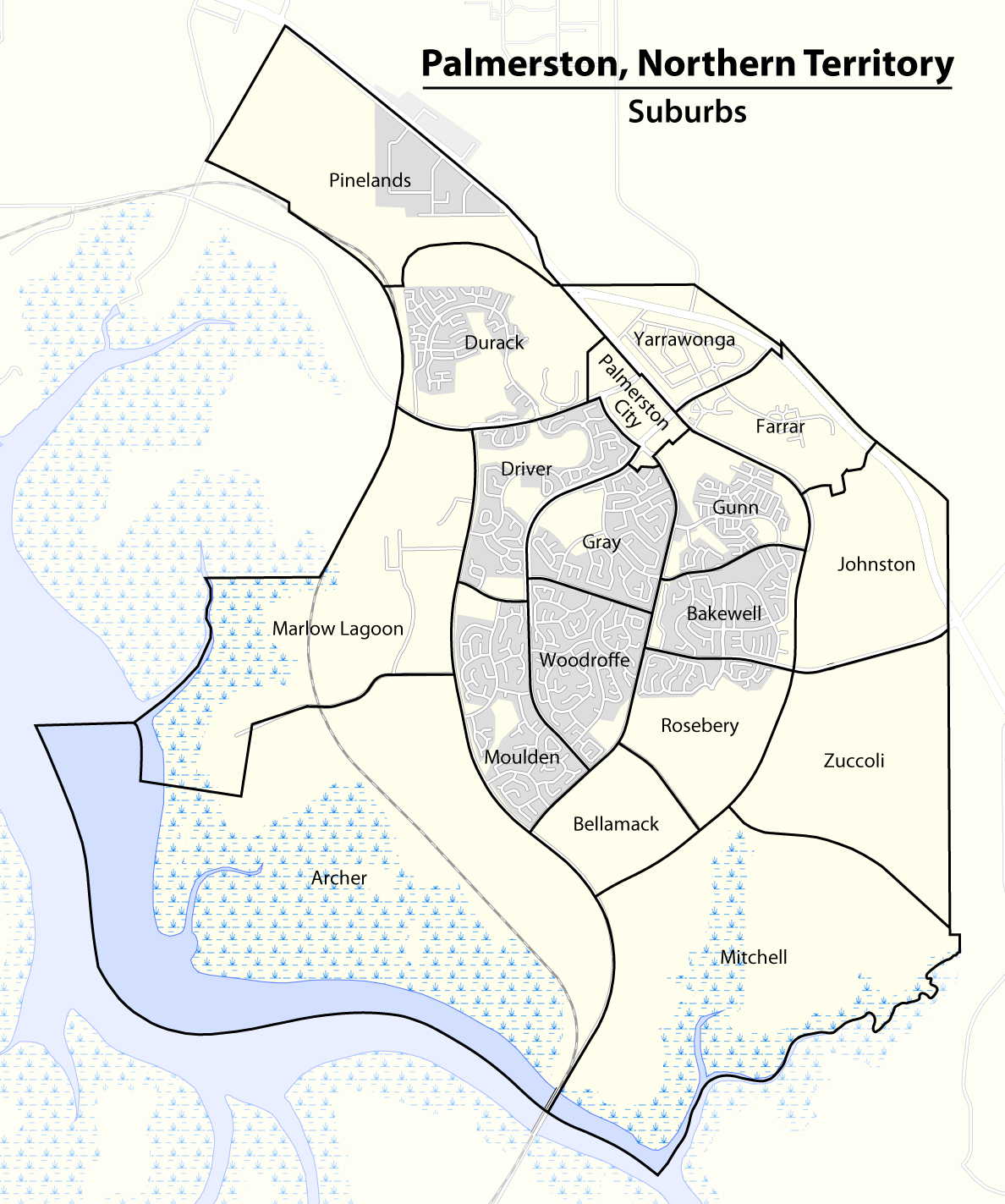
Map of City of Palmerston with suburbs

Inner City	Outskirts
Bakewell (0832); Bellamack (0832); Driver (0830); Durack (0830); Gray (0830); Gunn (0832); Moulden (0830); Palmerston City (0830); Rosebery (0832); Woodroffe (0830)	Archer (0830); Farrar (0830); Johnston (0830); Marlow Lagoon (0830); Mitchell (0832); Pinelands (0829); Yarrawonga (0830); Zuccoli (0830)

=== Litchfield ===
Outer Darwin	Western Rural	Eastern Rural
Bees Creek; Coolalinga; Freds Pass; Girraween; Holtze; Howard Springs; Humpty Doo; Knuckey Lagoon; McMinns Lagoon; Noonamah; Robertson Barracks; Virginia	Berry Springs; Blackmore; Channel Island; Darwin River; Fly Creek; Livingstone; Southport; Tumbling Waters; Weddell; Wickham	Acacia Hills; Black Jungle; Gunn Point; Herbert; Hughes; Lambells Lagoon; Lloyd Creek; Manton; Middle Point; Murrumujuk

=== Wagait ===
Before 2008-07-01 Cox Peninsula Community Government Council:

- Wagait Beach (0822)
- Mandorah (0822)

== See also ==
- Local government areas of the Northern Territory
