= McMillans Road =

Road in Darwin, Northern Territory

McMillans Road Northern and eastern suburbs, Darwin Northern Territory
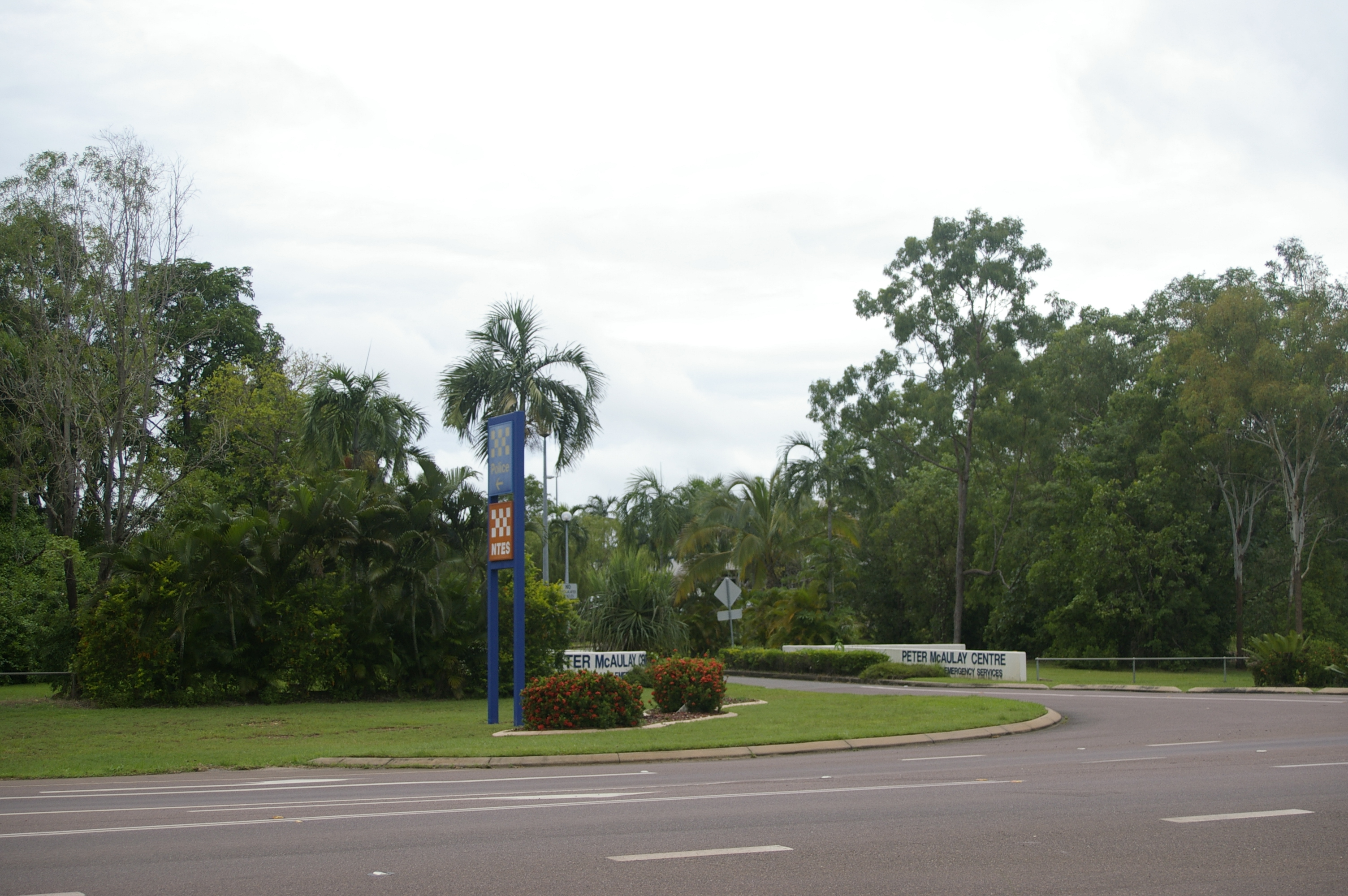
- Entrance to Peter McAulay Centre, NT Police, Fire and Emergency Services Headquarters off McMillans Road

General information
- Type: Road
- Length: 13.2 km (8.2 mi)
- Opened: 1920s

Major junctions
- West end: Bagot Road, Millner
- SW end: Stuart Highway, Knuckey Lagoon

Location(s)
- Major suburbs: Jingili, Moil, Marrara, Anula, Malak, Karama, Berrimah

McMillans Road is a major arterial road in the northern and eastern suburbs of Darwin, Northern Territory Australia. The road provides an access route for some of the city's most important infrastructure including Darwin International Airport, Northern Territory Institute of Sport, Marrara Oval and the headquarters and training college of the Northern Territory Police. It is also the main road access to Crocodylus Park, a major tourist attraction boasting a crocodile farm and small zoo. The road is named for the McMillan brothers as it was originally the access to pastoral leases they held in the 1920s and 1930s.

McMillans Road was extended in 1999 to provide through access to the Stuart Highway, improving access between Palmerston and Royal Darwin Hospital located in Tiwi in the northern suburbs as well as the commercial district of Casuarina.
