= Trower Road =

Road in Darwin, Northern Territory

Trower Road Millner/Rapid Creek to Brinkin Northern Territory
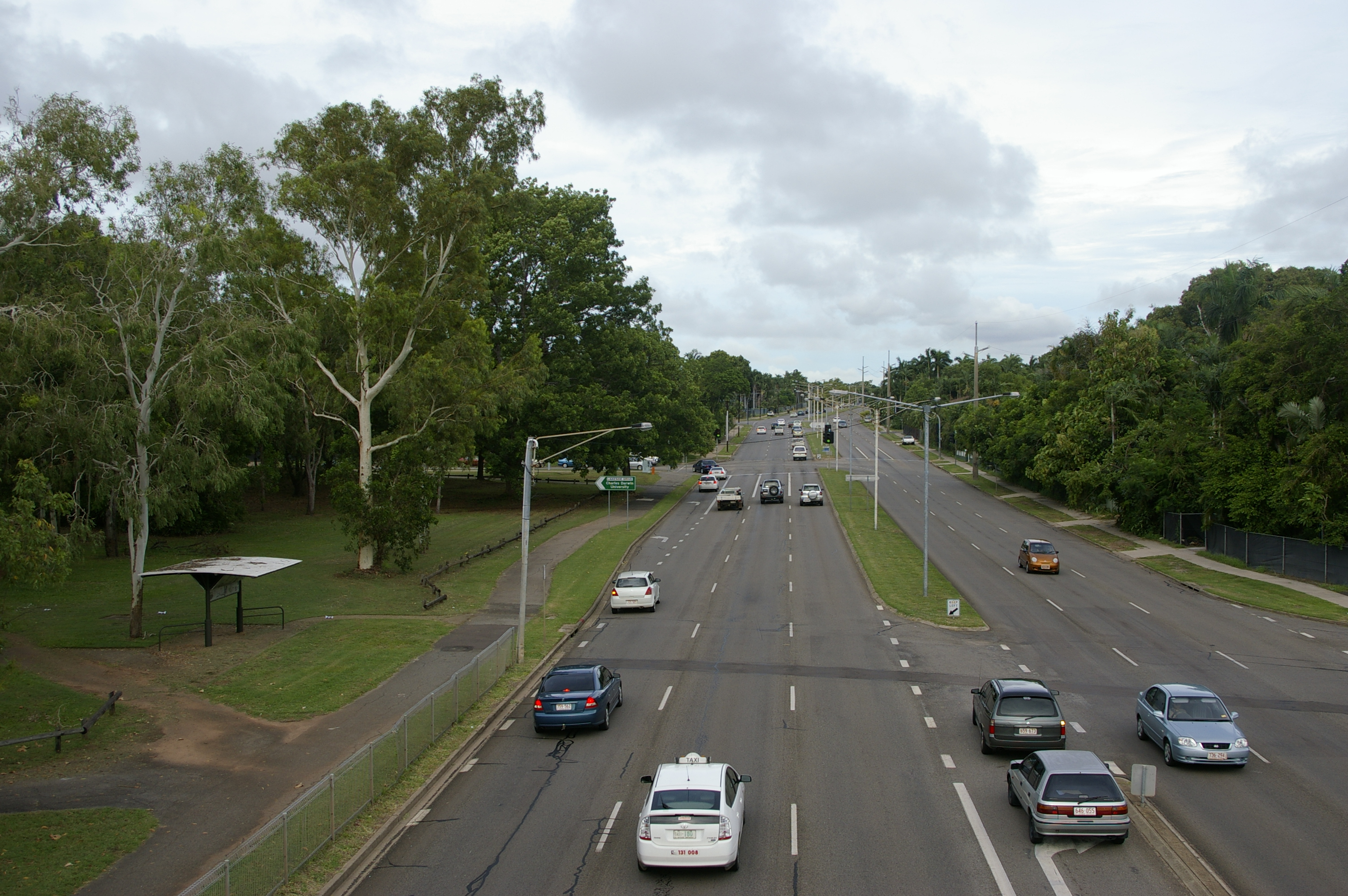
- Trower Road in the suburb of Alawa

General information
- Type: Road
- Length: 7.4 km (4.6 mi)
- Opened: 1963

Major junctions
- West end: Bagot Road, Millner
- Rapid Creek Road; Dripstone Road; Vanderlin Drive

Location(s)
- Major suburbs: Rapid Creek, Casuarina

Trower Road is a major arterial road in the northern suburbs of Darwin, Northern Territory, Australia. The road is a major access route for services and institutions located in the Casuarina area, including Casuarina Square, Royal Darwin Hospital and Charles Darwin University. The road is named for Horace M Trower, Director of Lands from 1917-21. It is one of the busiest roads in Darwin, used by an average of 27,084 vehicles per day in 2010, behind only Bagot Road and the Stuart Highway. Trower Road provides dual carriageways separated by central median for most of its length, however as many suburban collector roads meet along the route, the maximum speed limit is 70 km/h (43 mph). The road was opened in stages between 1963 and 1969 as development in the northern suburbs progressed. A final extension in 1981 providing access to the Casuarina Coastal Reserve left a section of the road in Brinkin isolated from the main route.

== Description of Route ==
From a traffic light controlled junction with Progress Drive in the suburb of Millner, Trower Road continues eastwards as an extension of Bagot Road towards Rapid Creek. This section was opened in 1963 as far as Rapid Creek Road. Trower Road then crosses Rapid Creek, passing the Jingili water gardens, where an elevated footbridge carries pedestrians over the road. The road meets Lakeside Drive at a traffic light controlled intersection in Alawa, before continuing to Rothdale Road. Despite Trower Road carrying three lanes of traffic in each direction, other than providing dedicated turning lanes, right turns are not protected at this junction.

From here, Trower Road begins to curve to the north, before reaching another set of traffic lights at Parer Drive outside Casuarina Senior College, providing access to Moil and Wagaman. This section then continues northeast to Dripstone Road and the Casuarina Square Shopping Centre.

Continuing on an alignment constructed between 1967 and 1969, Trower Road meets Vanderlin Drive at a major junction just north of Dripstone road with both intersections controlled by traffic lights. Beyond Casuarina there is significantly less traffic that uses the road, which turns back west passing Henbury Avenue (providing access to the Royal Darwin Hospital) and Dripstone Middle School. Through the suburbs of Tiwi, Nakara and Brinkin, Trower Road narrows before arriving at a roundabout entering the Casuarina Coastal Reserve and becoming an access road for carparks spread along the foreshore.

== See also ==
- Bagot Road
