= Sanderson, Northern Territory =

Sanderson
- Suburb
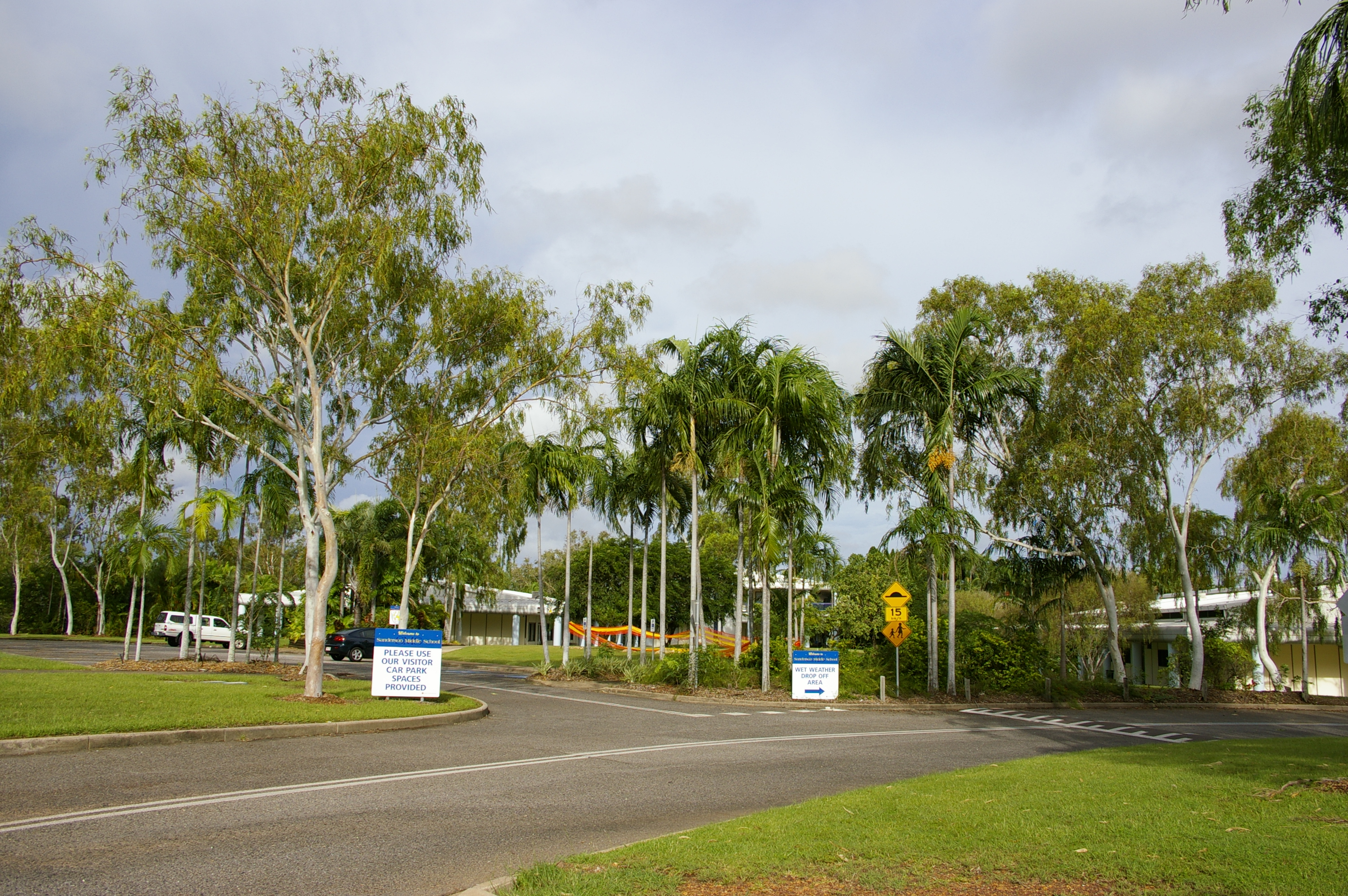
- Sanderson Middle School

- Interactive map of Sanderson
- Coordinates: 12°23′22″S 130°53′51″E
- Country: Australia
- State: Northern Territory
- City: Darwin
- LGA: City of Darwin
- Location: 12 km (7.5 mi) from Darwin

Government
  - Territory electorates: Casuarina; Sanderson
  - Federal division: Solomon
- Postcode: 0812
Suburbs around Sanderson
Wulagi	Leanyer
Anula	Sanderson	Malak
		Malak

The Town of Sanderson is not a town as such, but an area of land within the City of Darwin. It contains a number of suburbs; Anula, Wulagi, Karama and Malak.

It is on the traditional lands and waterways of the Larrakia people.

== Present day ==
The Town of Sanderson was proclaimed in 1972, encompassing an area to the east of Lee Point Road in Darwin's northern suburbs.

== History ==
The Hundred of Sanderson was proclaimed in 1879 for the area of Lee Point and Shoal Bay near Port Darwin and is believed to be named after Frederick James Sanderson, SM JP who entered the public service as a clerk in July 1854, aged 20. In 1862, Sanderson was appointed Secretary to the Land Titles Commissioner and Secretary to the Attorney-General in December 1870. He was the first Commissioner of Patents and in 1878 was appointed as Collector of Customs and Chief Inspector of Distilleries in 1879. In 1888, he was appointed President of the Marine Board as well as Collector of Customs. He died in 1903, aged 69 years.

In 1963, the Governor-general was asked to revoke the Hundred of Sanderson and to include the area in the Hundred of Bagot. The then Minister for Territories requested that Sanderson's name be preserved in some way.
