= Rapid Creek, Northern Territory =

Coordinates: 12°22′51″S 130°51′44″E

Rapid Creek Darwin, Northern Territory
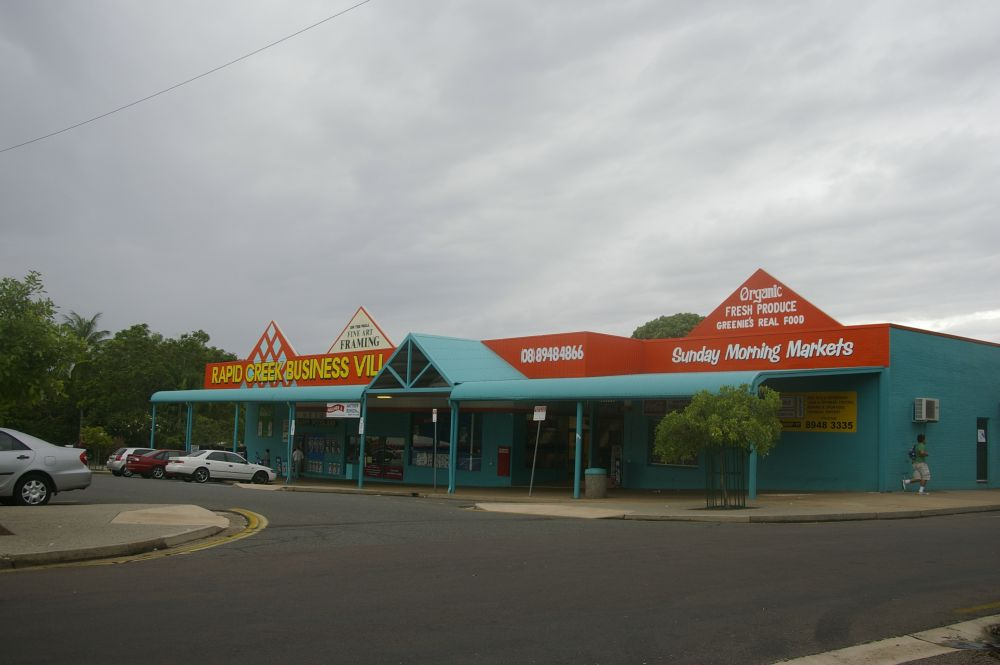

- Population: 3,261 (SAL 2021)
- Postcode(s): 0810
- Area: 1.9 km^{2} (0.7 sq mi)
- Location: 11 km (7 mi) from Darwin City
- LGA(s): City of Darwin
- Territory electorate(s): Nightcliff
- Federal division(s): Solomon
Suburbs around Rapid Creek:
Darwin Harbour	Darwin Harbour	Brinkin
Nightcliff	Rapid Creek	Alawa
Coconut Grove	Millner	Jingili
- Footnotes: Adjoining suburbs

Rapid Creek at sunset taken from the footbridge

Rapid Creek refers to both a creek in the city of Darwin, Northern Territory, Australia and the name of a suburb north of the city, situated where the creek meets Darwin Harbour. It is the traditional country and waterways of the Larrakia people.

== History ==
The creek is known to Larrakia People as Gurinbey, that means 'elbow', referring to the bend in its formation.

Although the precise circumstances of the re-naming of Rapid Creek remain obscure, the name must have been applied by Surveyor-General George W. Goyder's surveyors not long after the arrival of the 1869 Northern Territory Survey Expedition. The outline of the creek, running from Marrara swamp to the sea between Casuarina Beach and Nightcliff, is present on Goyder's map, though no name appears on it. Goyder personally visited the locality on Saturday, 3 April 1869 and described the creek, without naming it, as "a strong shallow stream near Night Cliff". Sometime between then and 13 September, the name came into existence. There is an entry in Goyder's diary for the latter date which records that surveyor George MacLachlan was sent out to Rapid Creek to check on the availability of fresh water and good feed for the horses. On the basis of a satisfactory report from MacLachlan, "all the spare bullocks and horses were sent out to Rapid Creek to rest", two days later.

The name remained in common local usage and it is evident that settlers continued to visit the area regularly. In a book published in 1882, William Sowden described travelling from Palmerston (Darwin) to Casuarina Beach passing "Rapid Creek, which rushes swiftly along its bed during the wet season, but at other times during the dry.....its waters are clear and crystal". The year 1882 also saw the establishment of the first permanent settlement in the area.

The suburb of Rapid Creek is bounded by the Darwin Harbour foreshore in the north, the Rapid Creek in the east, Trower Road in the south and Nightcliff Road in the west. Rapid Creek was originally established in the late 19th century when it was settled by the German Jesuit Mission from 1882 to 1891, which proved unsuccessful.

Rapid Creek prior to World War II was a favourite day trip / picnic area for Darwin residents, along the bush track which later became Bagot Road and McMillans Road. After Nightcliff grew as a seaside suburb in the 1950s, residential development expanded into the Rapid Creek area, primarily during the 1960s. The streets in Rapid Creek are mostly named after early police officers.

Nightcliff and Rapid Creek were the first Darwin suburbs to feel the force of Cyclone Tracy which came off the Timor Sea on 25 December 1974. Many of the residential buildings were totally destroyed.

== Present day ==
Rapid Creek is a predominantly residential area and is generally associated with its sister suburb, Nightcliff, and the adjacent northern suburbs of Millner and Coconut Grove. A lot of development has been completed on the coastal road, Casuarina Drive, which runs along the coast from Rapid Creek to Nightcliff.

Rapid Creek Sunday Market is the oldest market in Darwin. It's held every Sunday morning, and comprises stalls selling fresh produce including fruit, vegetables, Asian produce, herbs and spices, exotic plants, and seafood. There are also food stalls selling dishes from a variety of cuisines including Indian curries, Malaysian Laksa, Vietnamese rice paper rolls and Thai papaya salad.
