= Anula =

Anula may refer to:

- Anula, Northern Territory, a suburb of Darwin, Australia
- Anula of Anuradhapura, a ruling queen of Anuradhapura in present-day Sri Lanka, also a Buddhist nun
- Anula Vidyalaya, a Buddhist school in Sri Lanka
- Anul, a village in India; also known as Anula
