= Bagot Road =

Road in Darwin, Northern Territory

Bagot Road, Darwin Northern Territory
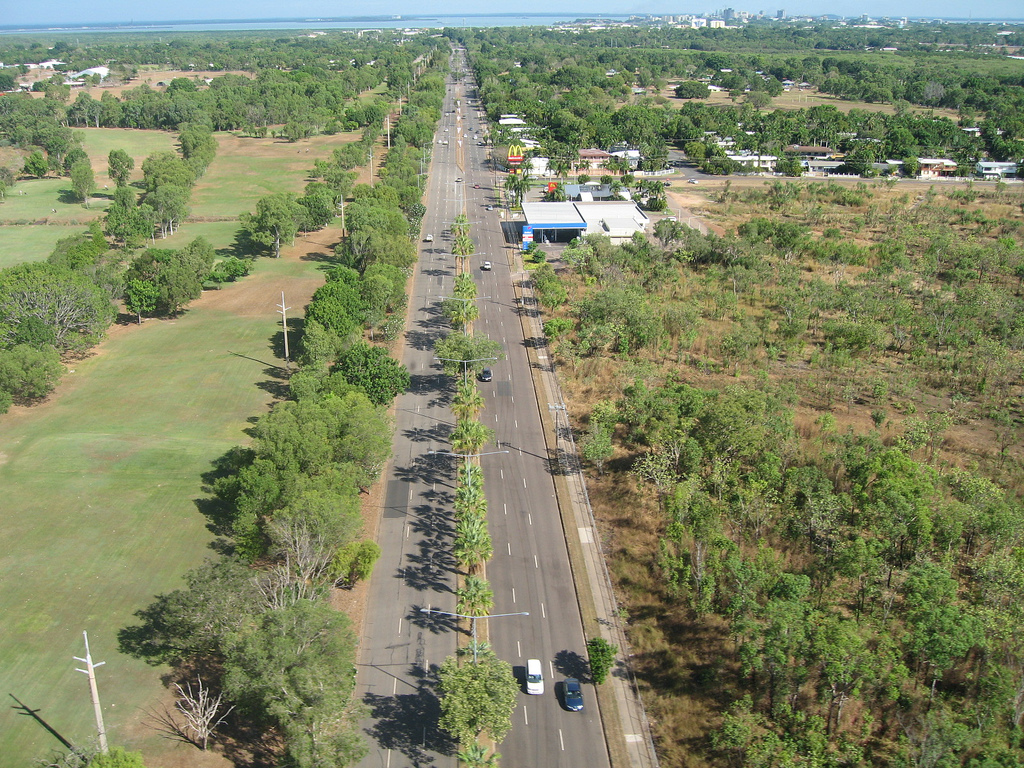
- Aerial view of Bagot Road, Ludmilla looking south towards the Stuart Highway

General information
- Type: Road
- Length: 4.5 km (2.8 mi)

Major junctions
- South end: Stuart Highway, Ludmilla
- North end: Coconut Grove

Location(s)
- Major suburbs: Bagot, Eaton, Millner

Bagot Road is a major arterial road in Darwin, Northern Territory Australia. The road forms part of the main transport route between the Central Business District, northern suburbs and Darwin International Airport. The origins of the name Bagot Road is believed to be in reference to the Bagot family of South Australia, who had significant land holdings in the early Northern Territory. In 2010, the road was used by an average of 34,487 vehicles per day. Due to the high traffic volumes, a number of major retailers and fast food outlets are situated along Bagot Road. Darwinbus Route 10 and Orbital Link services travel the length of Bagot Road with frequent stops in both directions.

Bagot Road begins in the suburb of Ludmilla at a partially grade separated intersection with the Stuart Highway. A flyover carrying citybound traffic opened in 1981 to reduce congestion and was the first grade-separated intersection in the Northern Territory. The $4 million flyover was completed a month ahead of schedule and received a national engineering design award in 1983. Bagot Road continues with dual carriageways providing for three lanes of traffic in each direction for most of its length. Major intersections at Totem Road/Osgood Drive and McMillans Road are controlled by traffic lights and provide access to the airport, while another set of traffic lights at Fitzgerald Street, Millner allows access to the Homemaker Village shopping centre. Past the Homemaker Village, Bagot Road becomes Trower Road extending northeast towards Casuarina from the junction with Nightcliff Road.

Prior to 1968 Bagot Road continued into the suburb of Nightcliff itself, however this section was then renamed Nightcliff Road past Progress Drive.
