= James Japanma =

Djipanyma better known as James Japanma (Jibanyma) (c.1902 – 1962) was an Aboriginal Australian and evangelist in the Northern Territory of Australia.

== Biography ==
Japanma was born in c.1902 (Note: There are discrepancies regarding Japanma's date of birth. The Northern Territory Dictionary of Biography lists it as c.1902, but records from the National Archives of Australia indicates a request to change Japanma's date of birth from 1898 to 1893.) and was one of the first group of Aboriginal people to arrive at the Roper River Mission (now Ngukurr). Aboriginal people sought refuge at the mission following systematic massacres by the organised hunting gangs of the Eastern and African Cold Storage Company.

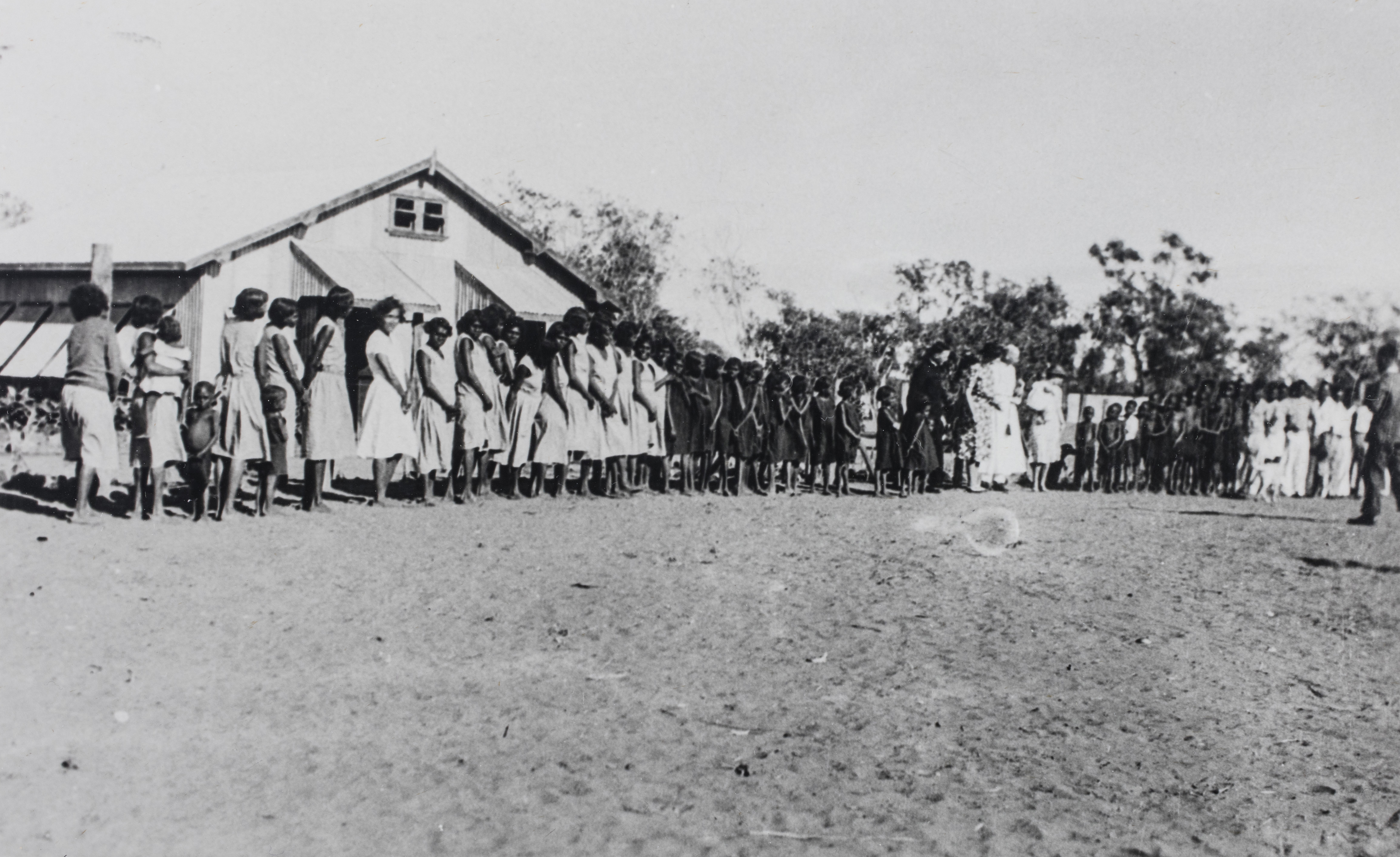
The Roper River Mission in 1938

Arriving to the mission as a young man, he quickly took a great interest in Christianity and was baptised on 11 May 1913 at the mission's first baptismal service at the age of 11.

When the Roper River Mission flooded in 1916, Reverend Alf Dyer recorded a humorous account of Japanma, ‘floating [by] on a large case reading a book without any apparent concern’. Japanma went on to become a key leader in the church in Ngukurr, being the first recognised Aboriginal evangelist at the Mission.

Japanma was of great value to the work of the European Missionaries as a translator, as almost none of them had knowledge of Aboriginal languages. By 1939, there were roughly 75 Aboriginal people on the Mission, mostly children and young people, and an additional 18 who were then classified as ‘half-castes’.

The Mission flooded again in January 1940 and while there were no deaths, the mission was destroyed. It was rebuilt five miles upstream at Picnic Point and in 1941, Helen Alder took over the work of Japanma, freeing him to engage in itinerant evangelism at the surrounding cattle stations. James was an avid reader and could recite large portions of the Bible by heart.

Japanma married Minnie McLoud, an Aboriginal woman from Borraloola.

In 1953, Japanma was one of four Roper River men chosen for possible ordination. A controversy over training requirements and a requirement for six years of theological away from the mission prevented Japanma's ordination.

Japanma died in 1962 and his work was taken over by Barnabas Roberts. He is buried at Darwin General Cemetery in Jingili.
