= Muirhead, Northern Territory =

Muirhead Darwin, Northern Territory
- Coordinates: 12°21′30″S 130°53′44″E
- Population: 2,398 (2016 census)
- Established: 2008
- Postcode(s): 0810
- Location: 15.8 km (10 mi) from Darwin City
- LGA(s): City of Darwin
- Territory electorate(s): Casuarina
- Federal division(s): Solomon
Suburbs around Muirhead:
Lee Point	Lee Point	Buffalo Creek
Lyons	Muirhead	Buffalo Creek
Wanguri	Wanguri

Muirhead is a northern suburb of the city of Darwin in the Northern Territory of Australia. It is on the traditional Country and waterways of the Larrakia people.

== History ==
Muirhead is named in commemoration of James Muirhead who was an Administrator of the Northern Territory and a judge of the Supreme Court of the Northern Territory. The area comprising Muirhead was part of the suburb of Lee Point.

Subdivision development of this suburb commenced in April 2011.
