= Millner, Northern Territory =

Millner Darwin, Northern Territory
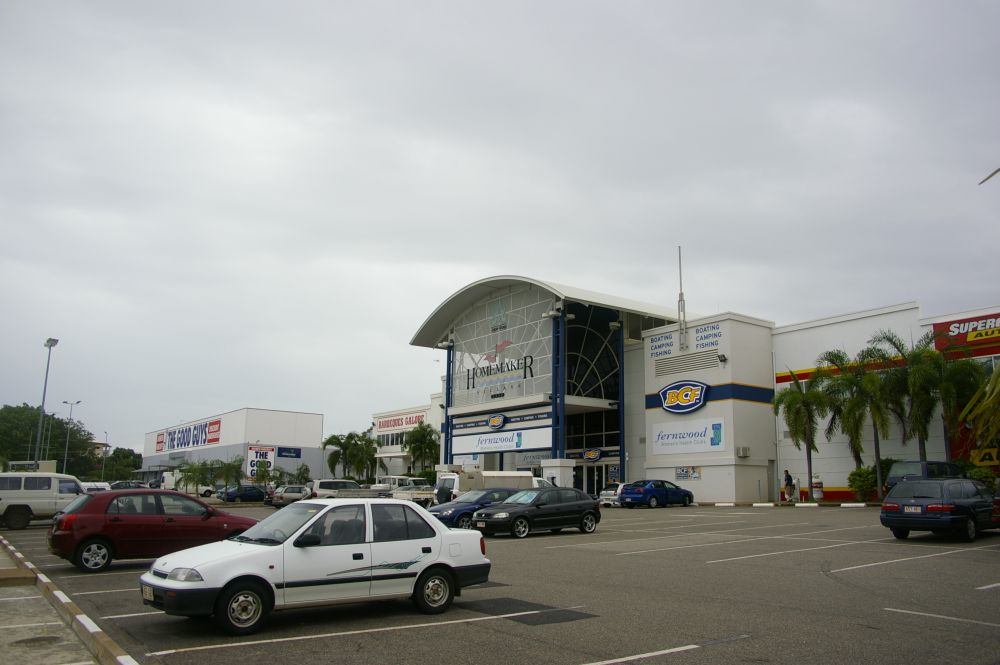
- Homemaker Village, Millner

- Coordinates: 12°23′28.00″S 130°51′47.55″E
- Population: 2,576 (SAL 2021)
- Postcode(s): 0810
- Area: 1.6 km^{2} (0.6 sq mi)
- Location: 10 km (6 mi) from Darwin
- LGA(s): City of Darwin
- Territory electorate(s): Johnston
- Federal division(s): Solomon
Suburbs around Millner:
Nightcliff	Rapid Creek	Alawa
Coconut Grove	Millner	Jingili
Coconut Grove	Eaton	Marrara

Millner is a northern suburb in the city of Darwin, in the Northern Territory of Australia. It is on the traditional country and waterways of the Larrakia people. The suburb is named after Dr James S. Millner, the medical officer in George W. Goyder's 1869 expedition to found the first colony at Port Darwin. He remained in the colony for six years before his death with his family aboard SS Gothenburg, which was wrecked on the Great Barrier Reef on 24 February 1875, with the loss of 102 lives.

== History ==
The National Archives of Australia (Darwin) is located in Kelsey Crescent. The Darwin office was under construction when Cyclone Tracy devastated Darwin in Christmas 1974. Construction continued, after the clean-up of the town, and the building opened in 1976. Being a purpose built repository with the added protection offered by strict Cyclone Coding it was one of the safest buildings in the whole of the Territory.

With the event of self-government for the Northern Territory in 1978, a Custody and Ownership Project was undertaken to split the Darwin collection between the Commonwealth and the State, and by 1984 the collection consisted of Commonwealth records only. In 2002 the refurbished Darwin office of the National Archives was opened, occupying part of the building with a smaller collection than had been envisioned during the repository's original construction in the 1970s.

== Present day ==
Millner is one of the major growth areas of the northern suburbs, containing Darwin's second largest shopping complex Homemaker Village (Jape Centre, Spotlight, BCF and various other specialty shops) located off Bagot Road.

Millner is centrally located between three main arterial roads; Bagot Road, McMillans Road and Trower Road. It houses the only velodrome in Darwin and is the home of junior association football. There are two primary schools located in the suburb. This suburb also has the Darwin International Airport bordering it. A Hotel / Motel is also situated on its boundary.

Millner is generally associated with the adjacent northern suburbs of Nightcliff, Rapid Creek and Coconut Grove.

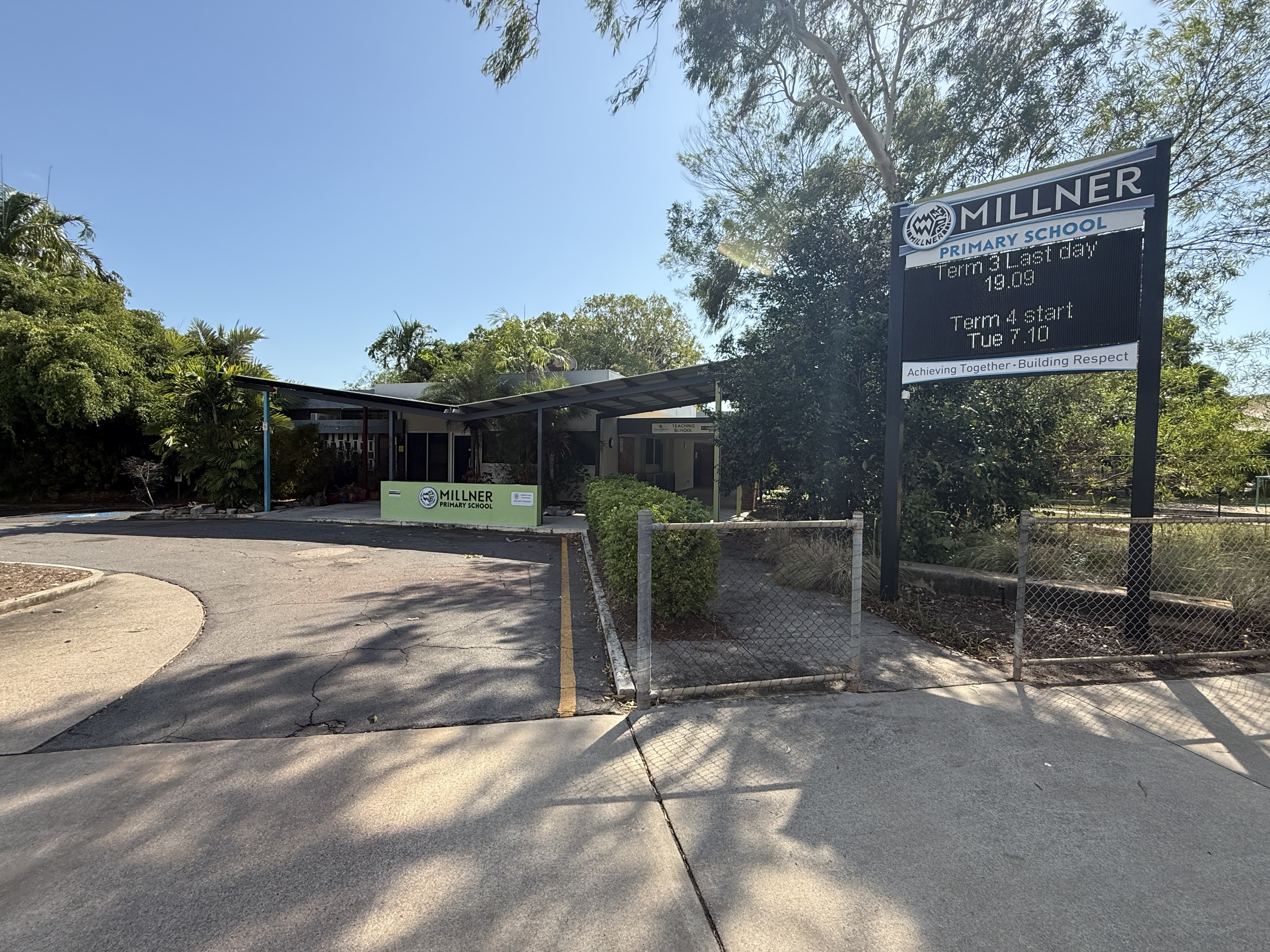
Millner Primary School, September 2025

== Population ==
The population of Millner at the 2016 census was 2548, and 2576 at the 2021 census.

== Gallery ==
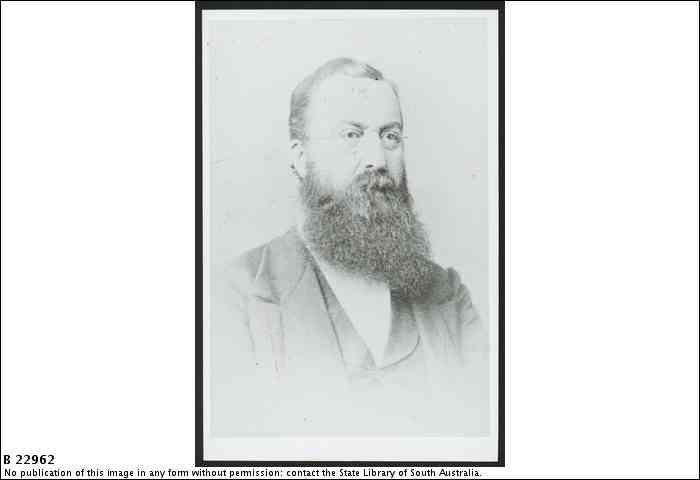
Dr. James Stokes Millner

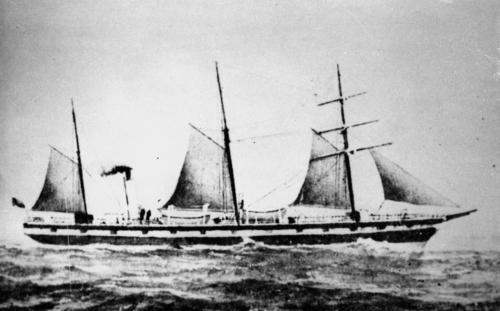
SS Gothenburg
