= Lyons, Northern Territory =

Lyons
- Suburb
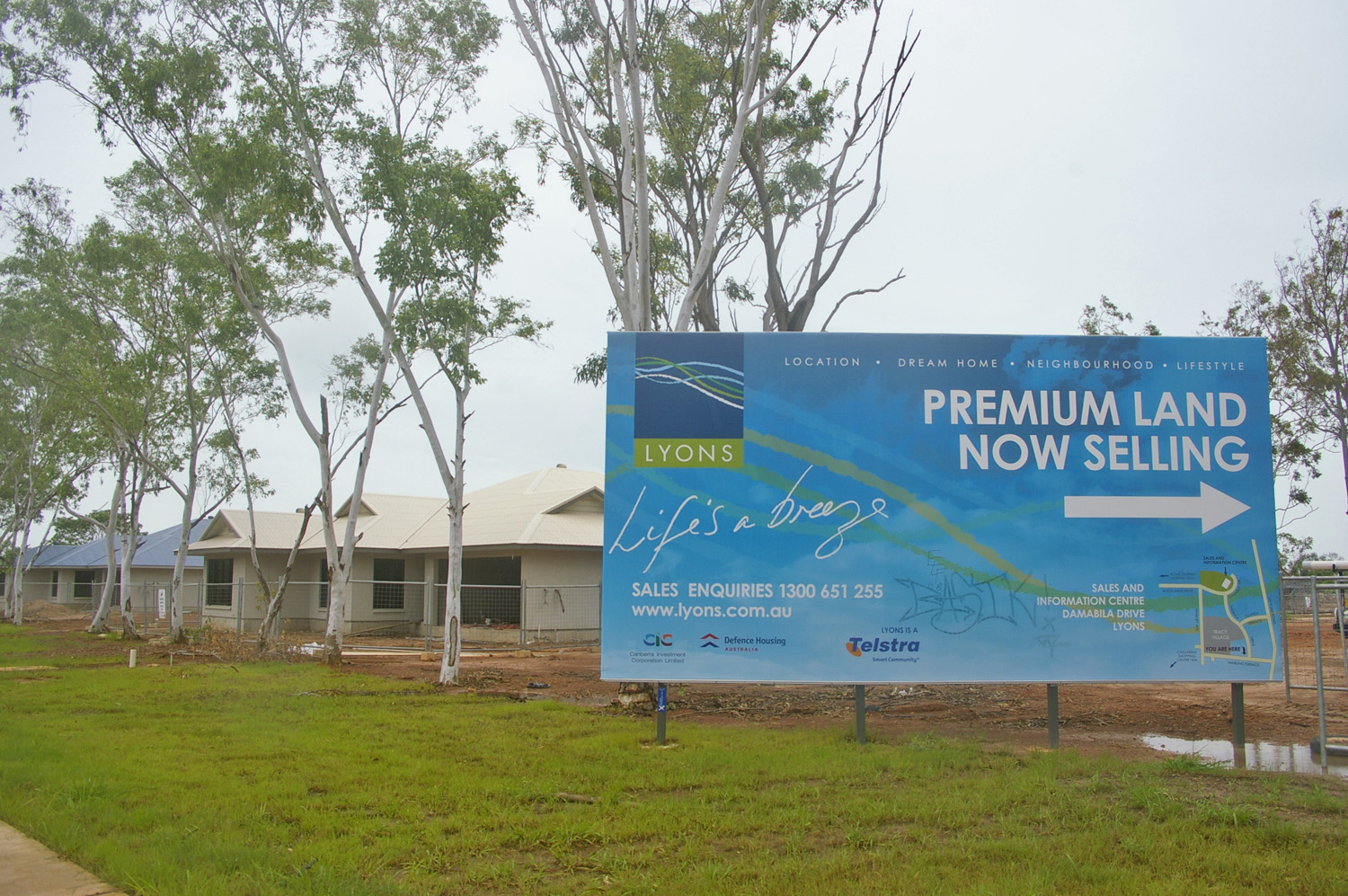

- Interactive map of Lyons
- Coordinates: 12°22′45″S 130°53′17″E
- Country: Australia
- State: Northern Territory
- City: Darwin
- LGA: City of Darwin
- Location: 16 km (9.9 mi) from Darwin
- Established: 2004

Government
  - Territory electorate: Casuarina
  - Federal division: Solomon

Population
  - Total: 2,302 (2016 census)
- Postcode: 0810
Suburbs around Lyons
	Lee Point
Royal Darwin Hospital	Lyons	Muirhead
Tiwi	Wanguri	Leanyer

Lyons is a northern suburb of the city of Darwin, Northern Territory, Australia. It is the traditional lands and waterways of the Larrakia people.

== Present day ==
Prior to gazettal on 7 July 2004, the area comprising Lyons was part of the suburb of Lee Point, Northern Territory.

== History ==
Lyons is named in commemoration of Tommy Imabulg Lyons, a traditional owner (Greater Darwin Area) and senior man for the Danggalaba clan of the Larrakia people, who was a member of the "Black Watch" and worked as a police tracker. Tommy lived most of his life on the Cox Peninsula, Dum In Mirrie Island and Indian Islands in Bynoe Harbour. He died in 1978.
