= Casuarina Senior College =

Coordinates: 12.3835°S 130.8789°E

Information
- Former name: Casuarina High School (1973–1994)
- Established: 1973; 53 years ago
- Years: 10–12
- Gender: Mixed
- Enrollment: c.950 (1979)
- Website: casuarinaseniorcollege.com.au

Casuarina Senior College (formerly known as Casuarina High School) is a coeducational state college situated in Casuarina, a northern suburb of Darwin, Northern Territory, Australia.

== History ==
Casuarina High School officially opened in 1973, initially enrolling approximately 200 students. Following the devastation caused by Cyclone Tracy in December 1974, the school temporarily operated as a comprehensive educational facility, accommodating a crèche, preschool, primary, and secondary education. During this period, while other schools in the region were being rebuilt, the student population grew significantly, reaching approximately 1,200 by 1975.

By 1976, Casuarina High School had resumed standard secondary operations, and that same year, a Music School was established on campus. In 1977, the school introduced an Agricultural Science program, and in 1978, it launched what is believed to be the first school-based Interpreter and Translator course in Australia. The school also became involved in the Duke of Edinburgh Award scheme and founded an Amateur Radio Centre, although the latter was disbanded in 1979. By that time, enrollment had stabilised at around 950 students.

The Amateur Radio Centre later reopened, and the establishment of Dripstone High School in Darwin’s northern suburbs helped alleviate student numbers at Casuarina. The school continued to function as a comprehensive high school until 1985.

In 1986, following a system-wide educational review in the Northern Territory, Casuarina High School was restructured and designated as a senior secondary college, serving only Years 11 and 12.

=== Transition to Senior College ===
In 1994, the institution adopted the name Casuarina Senior College. It developed a reputation for fostering independent learning in a mature academic environment and consistently achieved strong academic outcomes. The college specialised in both vocational and academic programs, maintaining this focus through the early 2000s.

=== 21st Century Developments ===
As part of a broader reform of Northern Territory education in 2006, the stages of schooling were introduced, resulting in the inclusion of Year 10 students within the senior secondary framework. Casuarina Senior College subsequently began serving students in Years 10 to 12.

In 2011, the college expanded its academic offerings with the establishment of a Centre for Excellence in Medicine and Health Sciences, further enhancing opportunities for students interested in health-related careers.

Changes to education policy in the Northern Territory, including adjustments to the minimum school leaving age, have continued to shape the college’s structure and strategic direction in recent years.
