= Nakara, Northern Territory =

Nakara Darwin, Northern Territory
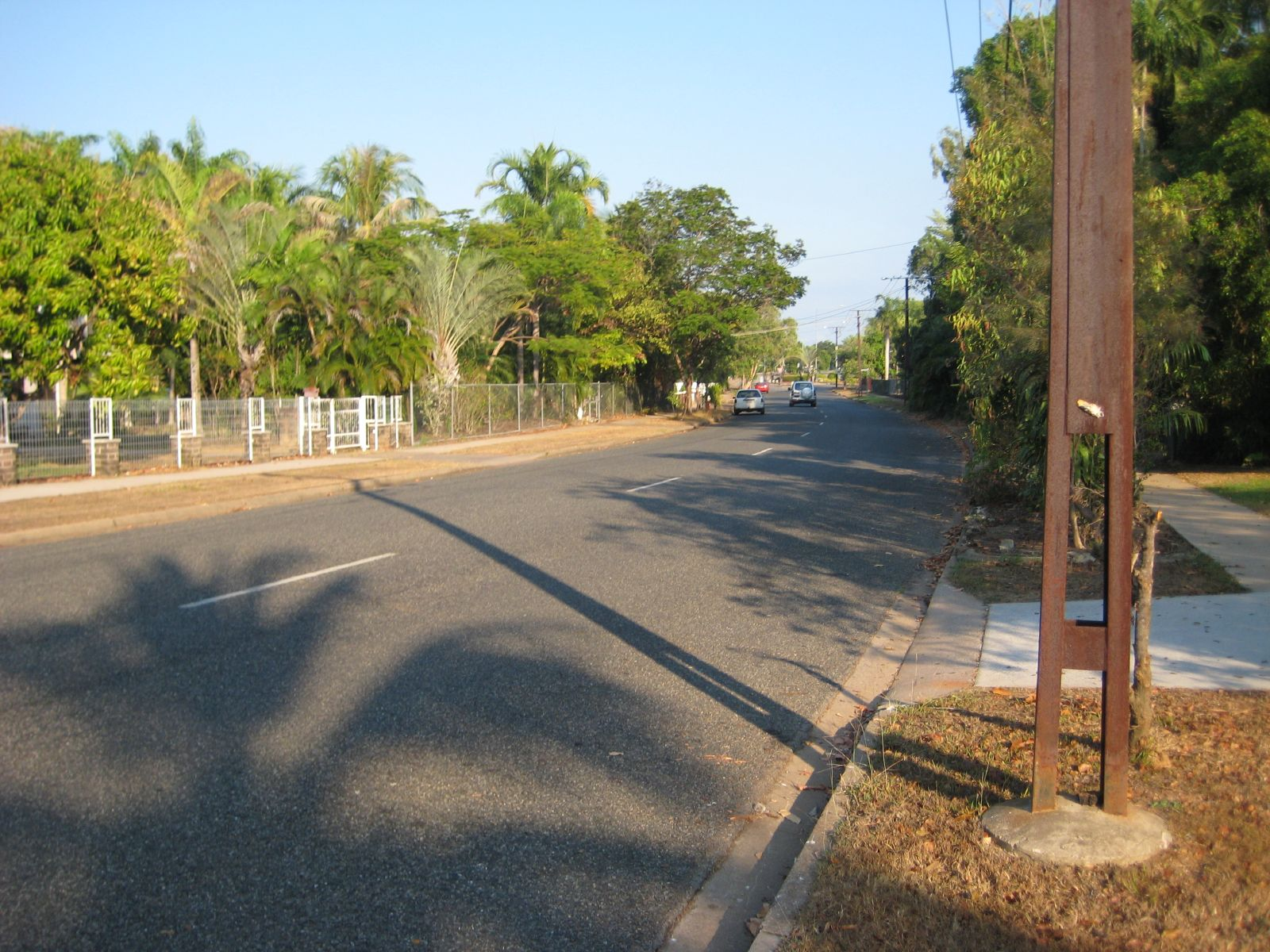
- Buchanan Terrace

- Coordinates: 12°22′10″S 130°52′41″E
- Population: 1,978 (2016 census)
  - Density: 1,800/km^{2} (4,660/sq mi)
- Established: 1972
- Postcode(s): 0810
- Area: 1.1 km^{2} (0.4 sq mi)
- Location: 14.2 km (9 mi) from Darwin
- LGA(s): City of Darwin
- Territory electorate(s): Casuarina
- Federal division(s): Solomon
Suburbs around Nakara:
| Tiwi | Tiwi | Lee Point |
| Brinkin | Nakara | Wanguri |
| Alawa | Casuarina | Wanguri |

Nakara is a northern suburb of the city of Darwin, Northern Territory, Australia. The suburb is bounded by Trower Road, Ellengowen Drive and Dripstone Road. It is in the local government area of City of Darwin. The suburb is mostly residential. It is on the traditional Country and waterways of the Larrakia people.

== History ==
Nakara is an older suburb in Darwin, the suburb was established before Cyclone Tracy in 1974.

It is named after the Nakara Indigenous Australians who live around Boucaut Bay, west of the Blyth River in northern Arnhem Land, close to Maningrida.

The streets in Nakara are mostly named after early residents of the Territory.
