= Coconut Grove, Northern Territory =

Coconut Grove
- Suburb
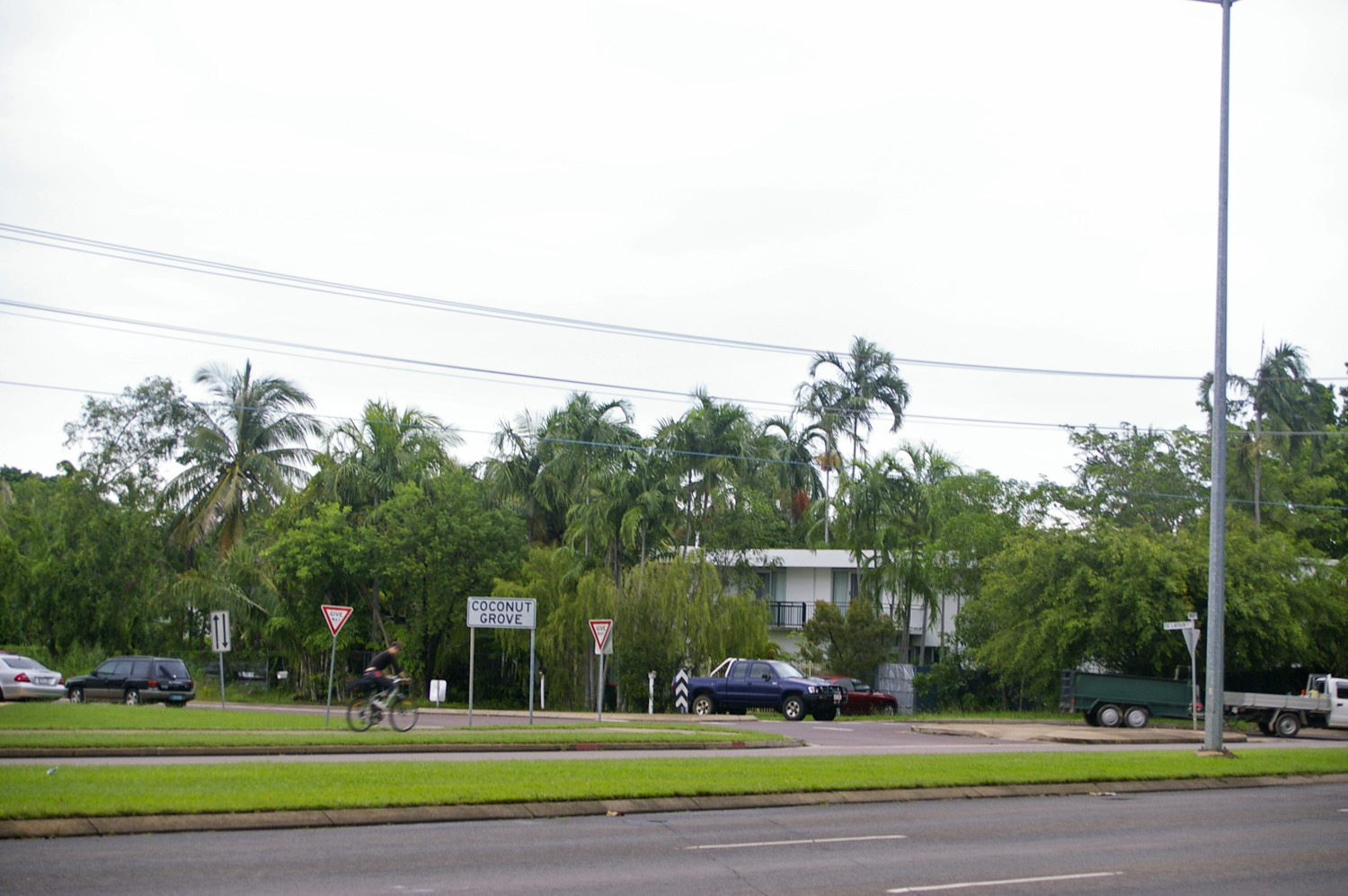

- Interactive map of Coconut Grove
- Coordinates: 12°23′56″S 130°51′9″E
- Country: Australia
- State: Northern Territory
- City: Darwin
- LGA: City of Darwin
- Location: 8.7 km (5.4 mi) from Darwin
- Established: 1962

Government
  - Territory electorate: Fannie Bay
  - Federal division: Solomon

Area
  - Total: 1.4 km^{2} (0.54 sq mi)

Population
  - Total: 3,050 (2016 census)
  - Density: 2,180/km^{2} (5,640/sq mi)
- Postcode: 0810
Suburbs around Coconut Grove
Nightcliff	Nightcliff	Rapid Creek
Nightcliff	Coconut Grove	Rapid Creek; Millner; Eaton
East Point	Ludmilla	Eaton

Coconut Grove is a northern suburb of Darwin, Northern Territory, Australia. It lies on the traditional country and waterways of the Larrakia people.

== History ==
Coconut Grove is named for the grove of coconuts on the coastal fringe of the area. Development of Coconut Grove dates back to the pre-war years when it was mainly used for farming, but the suburb primarily grew from the 1960s.

Coconut Grove is a small residential and light industrial suburb. Coconut Grove is bounded by Progress Drive in the north, Bagot Road in the east, Totem Road in the south and the Darwin Harbour foreshore in the west. Most streets in Coconut Grove are named after local Darwin residents, interstate visitors and crew who died during the shipwreck of the SS Gothenburg off the Queensland coast in 1875.

Coconut Grove is usually associated with the adjacent northern Darwin suburbs of Nightcliff, Millner and Rapid Creek.
