= Anul =

Anul Anula
- village
- Location in Andaman and Nicobar Islands, India Anul (India)
- Coordinates: 7.3572225°N 93.6930618°E
- Country: India
- State: Andaman and Nicobar Islands
- District: Nicobar
- Tehsil: Great Nicobar
- Elevation: 84 m (276 ft)

Population (2011)
  - Total: 8
- Time zone: UTC+5:30 (IST)
- 2011 census code: 645142

Anul is a village in the Nicobar district of Andaman and Nicobar Islands, India. It is located in the Great Nicobar tehsil.

== Demographics ==
The village was affected by the 2004 Indian Ocean earthquake and tsunami. According to the 2011 census of India, only 1 household has survived in Anul. The effective literacy rate (i.e. the literacy rate of population excluding children aged 6 and below) is 42.86%.

Demographics (2011 Census)
	Total	Male	Female
Population	8	3	5
Children aged below 6 years	1	0	1
Scheduled caste	0	0	0
Scheduled tribe	8	3	5
Literates	3	2	1
Workers (all)	6	3	3
Main workers (total)	6	3	3
Main workers: Cultivators	0	0	0
Main workers: Agricultural labourers	0	0	0
Main workers: Household industry workers	0	0	0
Main workers: Other	6	3	3
Marginal workers (total)	0	0	0
Non-workers	2	0	2
