= Buffalo Creek, Northern Territory =

Buffalo Creek
- Suburb
- Interactive map of Buffalo Creek
- Coordinates: 12°20′43″S 130°55′04″E
- Country: Australia
- State: Northern Territory
- City: Darwin
- LGA: City of Darwin

Government
  - Territory electorate: Wanguri
  - Federal division: Solomon

Population
  - Total: 0 (2016 census)
- Postcode: 0810
Suburbs around Buffalo Creek
Beagle Gulf	Beagle Gulf	Beagle Gulf
Lee Point; Leanyer	Buffalo Creek	Micket Creek
Leanyer	Holmes	Holmes

Buffalo Creek is a northern suburb of the city of Darwin, Northern Territory, Australia. It is the traditional country and waterways of the Larrakia people.

== History ==
Buffalo Creek is an undeveloped northern suburb of Darwin. The name is taken from the stream of the same name which first appears on maps in the 1940s by the Army.
