= City of Darwin =

Coordinates: 12°24′55″S 130°53′29″E

- Local government area
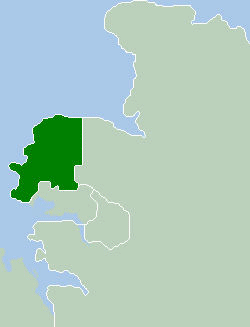

- Interactive map of City of Darwin
- Country: Australia
- State: Northern Territory
- Region: Metropolitan Darwin
- Established: 1869
- Council seat: Darwin City

Government
  - Lord Mayor: Peter Styles (CLP)
  - Territory electorate: Casuarina, Fannie Bay, Fong Lim, Johnston, Karama, Nightcliff, Port Darwin, Sanderson, Spillett, Wanguri
  - Federal division: Solomon

Area
  - Total: 111 km^{2} (43 sq mi)

Population
  - Total: 80,530 (LGA 2021)
- Website: City of Darwin
LGAs around City of Darwin
Unincorporated Top End Region	Unincorporated Top End Region	Unincorporated Top End Region
Unincorporated Top End Region	City of Darwin	Litchfield
Unincorporated Top End Region	Darwin Waterfront Precinct; Northern Territory Rates Act Area	Unincorporated Top End Region

The City of Darwin is a local government area of the Northern Territory, Australia. It includes the central business district of the capital, Darwin City, and represents two-thirds of its metropolitan population. Located on the traditional land and waterways of the Larrakia people, the city covers an area of 111 square kilometres (43 sq mi) and in the 2021 census had a population of 80,530 people.

== History ==
The Larrakia people are the traditional owners of the lands and waters in and surrounding the Darwin local government area. Darwin is known as Garramilla in Gulumirrgin, one of the languages of the Larrakia people, but there are many place names within the area.

The first Town and District Council was formed in 1874. The Darwin Town Council was created in 1915. From 1921 the five member Council had been elected on a ratepayer's franchise. In 1930 the Mayor and councillors resigned in protest against the re-introduction of adult suffrage. A caretaker Council was appointed until 1937, when it was abolished at the council's own request.

In 1955 a statement added to the Local Government Ordinance provided for the Constitution of the Municipality of Darwin. In 1957 the council was increased to twelve members and a Mayor.

An annual election providing for the Mayor and half of the Council members to be retired at each election, was also introduced at this time. The first council elections were held on 29 June 1957 and the first elected mayor of Darwin was Lucius (Bill) Richardson. In 1959 an Ordinance provided that the Municipality of Darwin be constituted a city and named "City of Darwin".

The first female Mayor of Darwin was Dr Ella Stack, who served as the mayor of Darwin from May 1975 to November 1979, and as Darwin's first Lord Mayor from November 1979.

== Governance and demographics ==
Wards of the City of Darwin. Richardson ward Waters ward Lyons ward Chan ward

The city, which lies on the northern coast in the Northern Territory of Australia, covers an area of 111 square kilometres (43 sq mi), and in the 2021 census had a population of 80,530 people.

The city falls across the following territory government electorates: Casuarina, Fannie Bay, Fong Lim, Johnston, Karama, Nightcliff, Port Darwin, Sanderson, Spillett, and Wanguri.

The Lord Mayor of Darwin is Peter Styles, who belongs to the Country Liberal Party.

City of Darwin is divided into four wards: Chan, Lyons, Richardson, and Waters (after former Lord Mayors of Darwin, Harry Chan, John "Tiger" Lyons, Lucius (Bill) Richardson, and Ken Waters). These wards are governed by 12 councillors, as well as one directly elected Lord Mayor. Councillors from each ward are elected using a Single Transferable Vote (STV) proportional system.

Elections were last held for the 2025 Darwin City Council election, as apart of the broader 2025 Northern Territory local elections.

Wards and councillors
Ward	Councillor	Party	Notes
Chan	Clarence McCarthy-Grogan	Independent	
Chan	Julie Fraser	Independent	
Chan	Peter Pangquee	Independent	
Lyons	Sam Weston	Independent	
Lyons	Mick Palmer	Independent CLP	
Lyons	Nicole Brown	Independent	
Richardson	Jimmy Bouhoris	Independent Labor	
Richardson	Shani Carson	Independent	
Richardson	Edwin Joseph	Independent	
Waters	Sylvia Klonaris	Independent	
Waters	Patrik Ralph	Independent	
Waters	Kim Farrar	Independent	

== Suburbs ==
Chan Ward (west)	Lyons Ward (south)	Richardson Ward (north)	Waters Ward (east)	Suburb Map
Coconut Grove; Jingili; Ludmilla (with Bagot); Millner; Moil; Nightcliff; Rapid Creek	Bayview; Charles Darwin (part); Darwin City (part); East Point; Fannie Bay; Hidden Valley (part); Larrakeyah; Parap; Stuart Park; The Gardens; Woolner	Alawa; Brinkin; Buffalo Creek; Casuarina; Holmes; Leanyer; Lee Point; Lyons; Muirhead; Nakara; Tiwi; Wagaman; Wanguri	Anula (with Northlakes); Berrimah (part); Coonawarra; Eaton; Karama; Malak (with Sanderson); Marrara; The Narrows; Winnellie; Wulagi	

Most of the suburb of Charles Darwin which is largely occupied by the Charles Darwin National Park reaches outside of the boundaries of the City of Darwin into unincorporated area, as do large parts of Berrimah and Hidden Valley. The last two suburbs, Buffalo Creek and Holmes, were approved in 2007. They are still largely undeveloped, especially Buffalo Creek.

== Demographics ==
Selected historical census data for City of Darwin local government area
Census year		2001	2006	2011	2016	2021
Population	Estimated residents on census night	69,455	66,291	72,930	78,804	80,530
Population	LGA rank in terms of size within Northern Territory		1st	1st	1st	1st
Population	% of Northern Territory population	34.26%	▲34.36%	▲34.41%	▲34.44%	▲34.48%
Population	% of Australian population	0.37%	▼0.33%	▲0.34%	0.34%	▼0.32%
Cultural and language diversity						
Ancestry, top responses	Australian			24.1%	▼21.2%	▲24.1%
Ancestry, top responses	English			20.7%	▼19.8%	▲25.1%
Ancestry, top responses	Irish			7.2%	▲7.4%	▲8.7%
Ancestry, top responses	Australian Aboriginal					7.9%
Ancestry, top responses	Scottish			5.7%	▼5.6%	▲7.1%
Ancestry, top responses	Chinese			3.6%	▲4.1%	▲6.0%
Language, top responses (other than English)	Greek	3.5%	▼3.3%	▲3.4%	▲3.5%	▼3.3%
Language, top responses (other than English)	Tagalog	1.0%		▲1.6%	▲2.2%	▼2.0%
Language, top responses (other than English)	Cantonese	1.0%	▼0.9%			-
Language, top responses (other than English)	Italian	0.8%	▼0.7%			-
Language, top responses (other than English)	Hakka	0.8%	0.8%			-
Language, top responses (other than English)	Indonesian		0.9%	▲1.0%		-
Language, top responses (other than English)	Mandarin			1.3%	▲2.0%	▲2.2%
Language, top responses (other than English)	Filipino			1.0%	▲1.5%	▼1.4%
Language, top responses (other than English)	Nepali				1.2%	▲3.0%
Religious affiliation						
Religious affiliation, top responses	Catholic	25.4%	▼24.7%	▼24.1%	▼22.3%	▼19.0%
Religious affiliation, top responses	No religion	20.5%	▲24.0%	▲25.0%	▲31.2%	▲38.9%
Religious affiliation, top responses	Anglican	14.5%	▼12.2%	▼10.6%	▼7.6%	▼5.1%
Religious affiliation, top responses	Uniting	6.5%	▼5.6%	▼4.5%		-
Religious affiliation, top responses	Eastern Orthodox	4.3%	▼4.1%	▲4.3%	▲4.4%	-
Median weekly incomes						
Personal income	Median weekly personal income		A$687	A$899	A$1039	A$1111
Personal income	% of Australian median income		147.4%	155.8%	157.0%	138.0%
Family income	Median weekly family income		A$1524	A$2063	A$2385	A$2463
Family income	% of Australian median income		130.2%	139.2%	137.5%	116.18%
Household income	Median weekly household income		A$1286	A$1809	A$2164	A$2188
Household income	% of Australian median income		125.2%	146.6%	150.5%	125.32%
Dwelling structure						
Dwelling type	Separate house	55.3%	▼54.9%	▼54.7%	▼52.6%	▼51.8%
Dwelling type	Semi-detached, terrace or townhouse	13.2%	11.9%▼	▲15.8%	▼13.3%	▼12.9%
Dwelling type	Flat or apartment	23.8%	▲27.2%	▼26.7%	▲31.8%	▲34.3%

== Sister and friendship cities ==
The city of Darwin has seven sister cities and four friendship cities. It also has a strategic partnership with Shenzhen, China.

City	State	Country	Year
Kalymnos	South Aegean region	Greece	April 1982
Anchorage	Alaska	United States	July 1982
Ambon	Maluku	Indonesia	October 1988
Haikou	Hainan	China	September 1990
Milikapiti	Northern Territory	Australia	July 1999
Dili	Dili District	East Timor	September 2003
Denpasar	Bali	Indonesia	June 2022

City	State	Country	Year
Honolulu	Hawaii	United States	March 2004
Santa Cruz Island	Galápagos Islands	Ecuador	March 2010
Qingdao	Shandong	China	October 2019
Guangzhou	Guangdong	China	October 2019
