= Eaton, Northern Territory =

Eaton
- Suburb
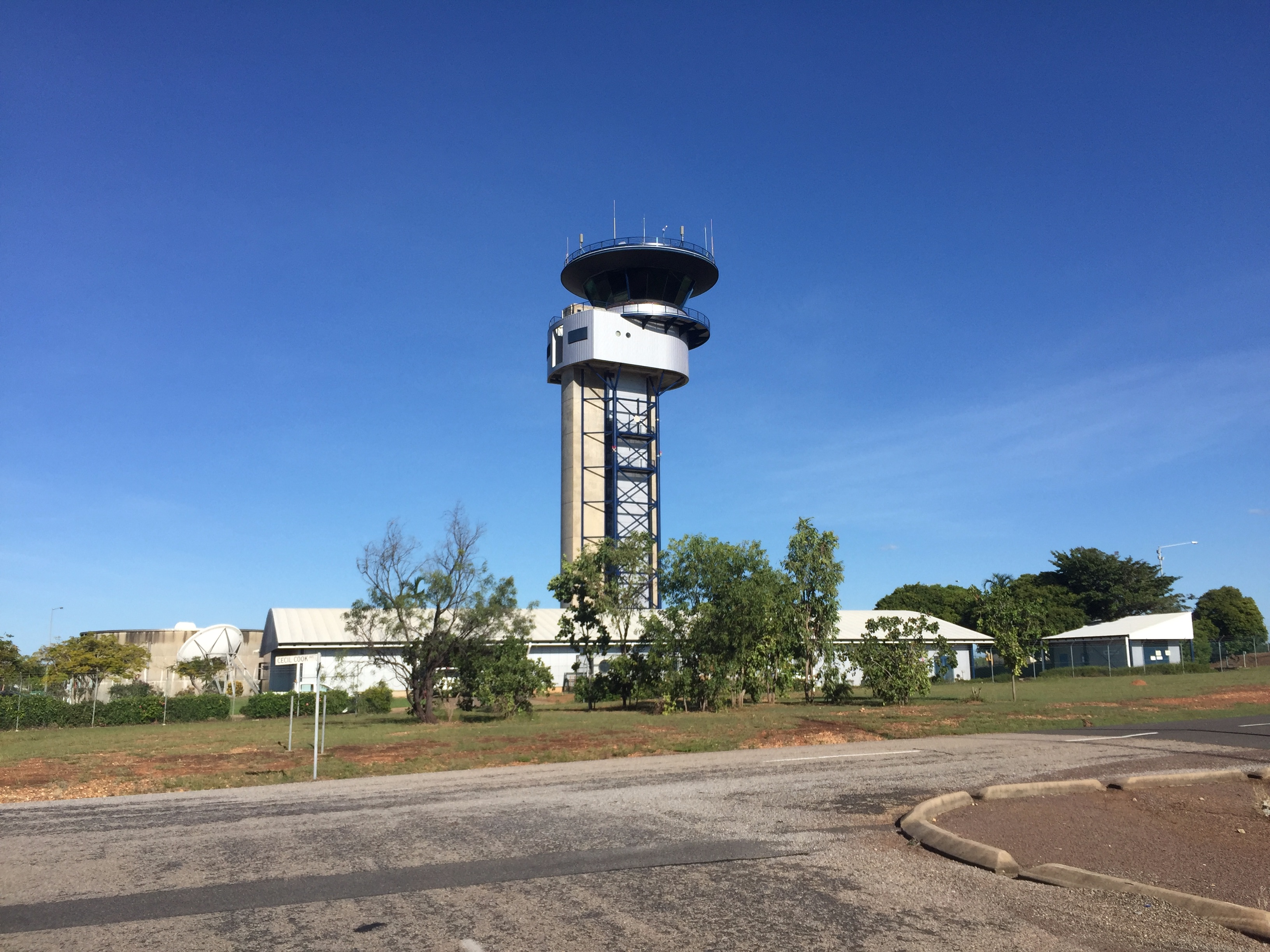
- Darwin Airport air traffic control tower

- Interactive map of Eaton
- Coordinates: 12°24′39″S 130°52′56″E
- Country: Australia
- State: Northern Territory
- LGA: City of Darwin
- Established: 4 April 2007

Government
  - Territory electorate: Sanderson
  - Federal division: Solomon

Population
  - Total: 213 (2016 census)
- Time zone: UTC+9:30 (ACST)
- Postcode: 0820
- Mean max temp: 32.0 °C (89.6 °F)
- Mean min temp: 23.2 °C (73.8 °F)
- Annual rainfall: 1,725.1 mm (67.92 in)
Suburbs around Eaton
Coconut Grove	Millner; Marrara	Marrara
Ludmilla; Coconut Grove	Eaton	Marrara; Berrimah
The Narrows	Winnellie	Berrimah

Eaton is a suburb in the Northern Territory of Australia located in the city of Darwin. It is the traditional country and waterways of the Larrakia people.

It consists of the land occupied by the Darwin International Airport and RAAF Base Darwin.

Eaton is named in commemoration of Charles Eaton (1895 – 1979), a senior officer in the Royal Australian Air Force whose service included appointment as the "Station Commander of RAAF Darwin" in 1940. The suburb’s boundary and name were gazetted on 4 April 2007.

The 2016 Australian census which was conducted in August 2016 reports that Eaton had 213 people living within its boundaries.

Eaton is located within the federal division of Solomon, the territory electoral division of Sanderson and the municipality of the City of Darwin.
