= Moil, Northern Territory =

Moil Darwin, Northern Territory
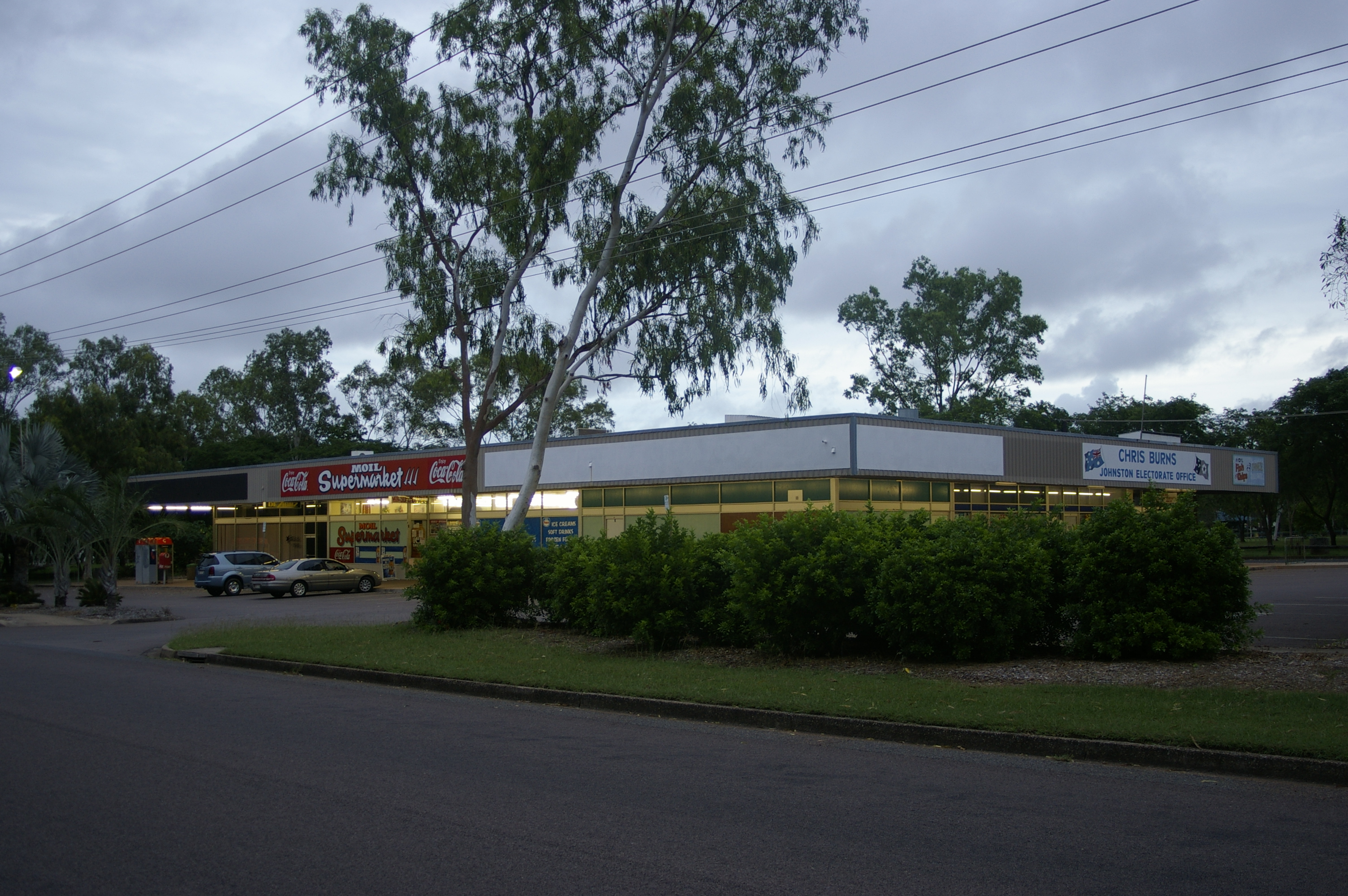
- Shopping complex at Moil

- Coordinates: 12°23′20″S 130°52′45″E
- Population: 2,000 (2016 census)
  - Density: 2,000/km^{2} (5,200/sq mi)
- Postcode(s): 0810
- Area: 1.0 km^{2} (0.4 sq mi)
- Location: 11.7 km (7 mi) from Darwin
- LGA(s): City of Darwin
- Territory electorate(s): Johnston
- Federal division(s): Solomon
Suburbs around Moil:
Alawa	Wagaman	Wulagi
Jingili	Moil	Anula
Darwin International Airport	Marrara	Marrara

Moil is a northern suburb of the city of Darwin, Northern Territory, Australia. It is the traditional country and waterways of the Larrakia people.

== History ==
Moil was built before Cyclone Tracy in 1974. While on Larrakia land, it derives its name from the Aboriginal people on the Moyle River who inhabit an area on the lower reaches of the Daly River and around Port Keats.
