= Karama, Northern Territory =

Karama
- Suburb
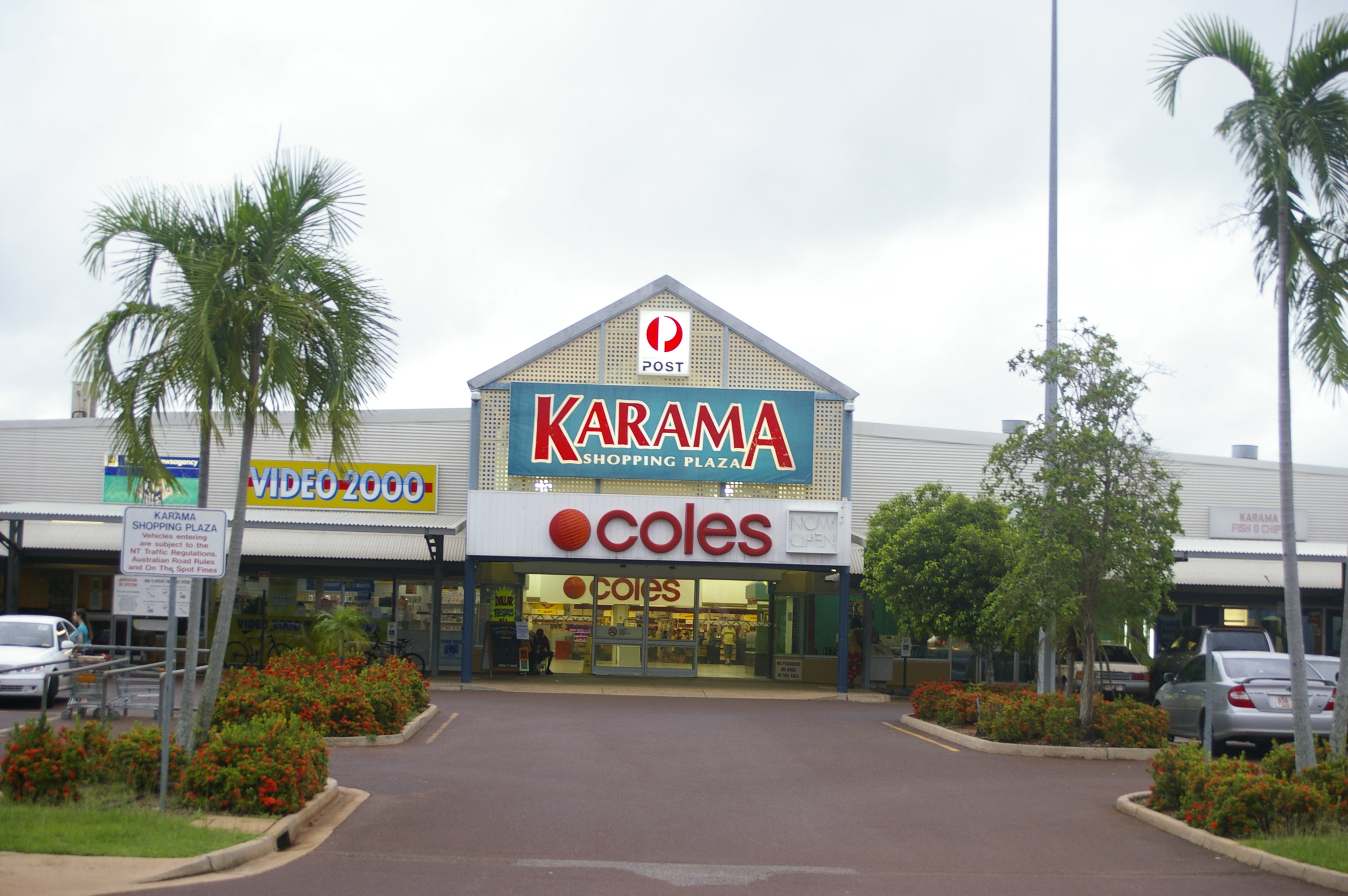
- Karama Shopping Plaza

- Interactive map of Karama
- Coordinates: 12°24′03.85″S 130°55′00.80″E
- Country: Australia
- State: Northern Territory
- City: Darwin
- LGA: City of Darwin
- Location: 14.1 km (8.8 mi) from Darwin
- Established: 1980s

Government
  - Territory electorate: Karama
  - Federal division: Solomon

Area
  - Total: 2.1 km^{2} (0.81 sq mi)

Population
  - Total: 4,944 (2016 census)
  - Density: 2,350/km^{2} (6,100/sq mi)
- Postcode: 0812
Suburbs around Karama
Leanyer
Malak	Karama
Marrara	Marrara	Knuckey Lagoon

Karama is a northern suburb of Darwin, Northern Territory, Australia. It is located on the traditional Country and waterways of the Larrakia people.

== History ==
The suburb of Karama is named after an Aboriginal tribe.

Karama is an established residential area in Darwin's northern suburbs built in the period from the late 1970s to the early 1980s.

The suburb is predominantly made up of residents of low socioeconomic status, with many homes being government housing.

In 1964, Douglas Lockwood recommended that a number of tribal names be used for the suburbs of Darwin.

== Present day ==
Some major features of the area include the Karama Primary School, Manunda Terrace Primary School, Holy Family Primary School, O'Loughlin Secondary College and Karama Shopping Plaza.

Karama Library is also located within the Karama Shopping Plaza, and is a service of Darwin City Council Libraries.

Brazil Crescent in Karama was named after Robert Brazil, a crewman (fireman) on the ill-fated SS Gothenburg, which sank off the north Queensland coast on 24 February 1875, with the loss of approximately 102 lives. Brazil was one of only 22 survivors and was awarded a medal for bravery and heroism for his efforts to save drowning passengers.

== Public Housing ==
Public housing is a prominent feature of the suburb. 16.8% of residents are public housing tenants compared to the Australian average of 3.8%.

Adam Giles, a former Chief Minister of the Northern Territory acknowledged that in Karama, "rundown public housing complexes had been shown to have higher incidences of antisocial behaviour, vandalism and crime."
