= Anula, Northern Territory =

Anula
- Suburb
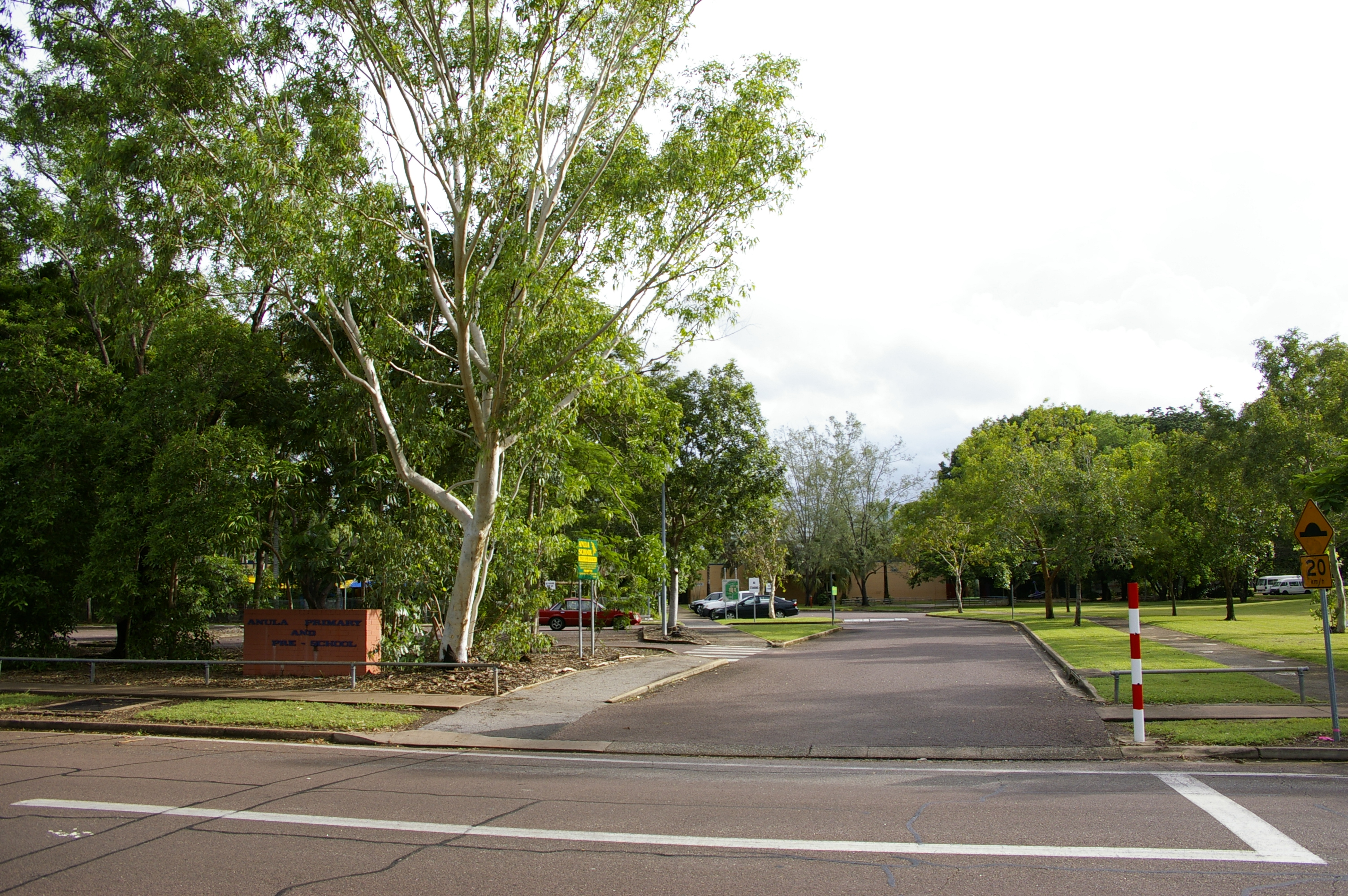
- Anula Primary and Pre-School

- Interactive map of Anula
- Coordinates: 12°23′34″S 130°53′24″E
- Country: Australia
- State: Northern Territory
- City: Darwin
- LGA: City of Darwin
- Location: 13 km (8.1 mi) from Darwin

Government
  - Territory electorate: Sanderson
  - Federal division: Solomon

Area
  - Total: 1.3 km^{2} (0.50 sq mi)

Population
  - Total: 2,385 (2021 census)
  - Density: 1,830/km^{2} (4,750/sq mi)
- Postcode: 0812
Suburbs around Anula
Wagaman	Wulagi	Sanderson
Moil	Anula	Malak
Marrara	Marrara	Marrara

Anula is a Northern suburb of Darwin, Northern Territory, in the Northern Territory of Australia. The suburb lies to the east of Lee Point Road and to the north of McMillans Road and covers an area of 1.318 km^{2} (0.509 sq mi). It is on the traditional Country and waterways of the Larrakia people.

The suburb lies to the north of Darwin International Airport which is also known as RAAF Base Darwin.

The streets in Anula are named after early NT Mines and mineral fields. Names such as Spring Hill Street, Caledonian Street, Wolfram Court and Zapopan Court being but a few examples.

== History ==
During World War II, in 1945, the No.1 Canadian Special Wireless Group was located in the present day suburb.

The suburb is named after the Anula group of the Yanyuwa nation who live around the Borroloola – McArthur River – Seven Emus area on the coastline of the Gulf of Carpentaria.

When the area was designed in 1966, the linguists' spelling was that listed, but variant uses of the name were Yanyula and Janjula. Yanyula Drive perpetuates one variant name for the tribe group, but the whole suburb enshrines Anula as the adopted name in the 1960s, gazetted finally as a suburb in 1984.

The suburb of Anula was under construction when Cyclone Tracy devastated Darwin in late 1974, with a few house constructions started and a handful completed. As part of the reconstruction the blocks, with remains of construction were cleared, the power infrastructure was placed underground and construction started again. Prior to the cyclone most houses were to be of the elevated type, however post cyclone most houses were concrete single level.
