= Marrara =

- Suburb
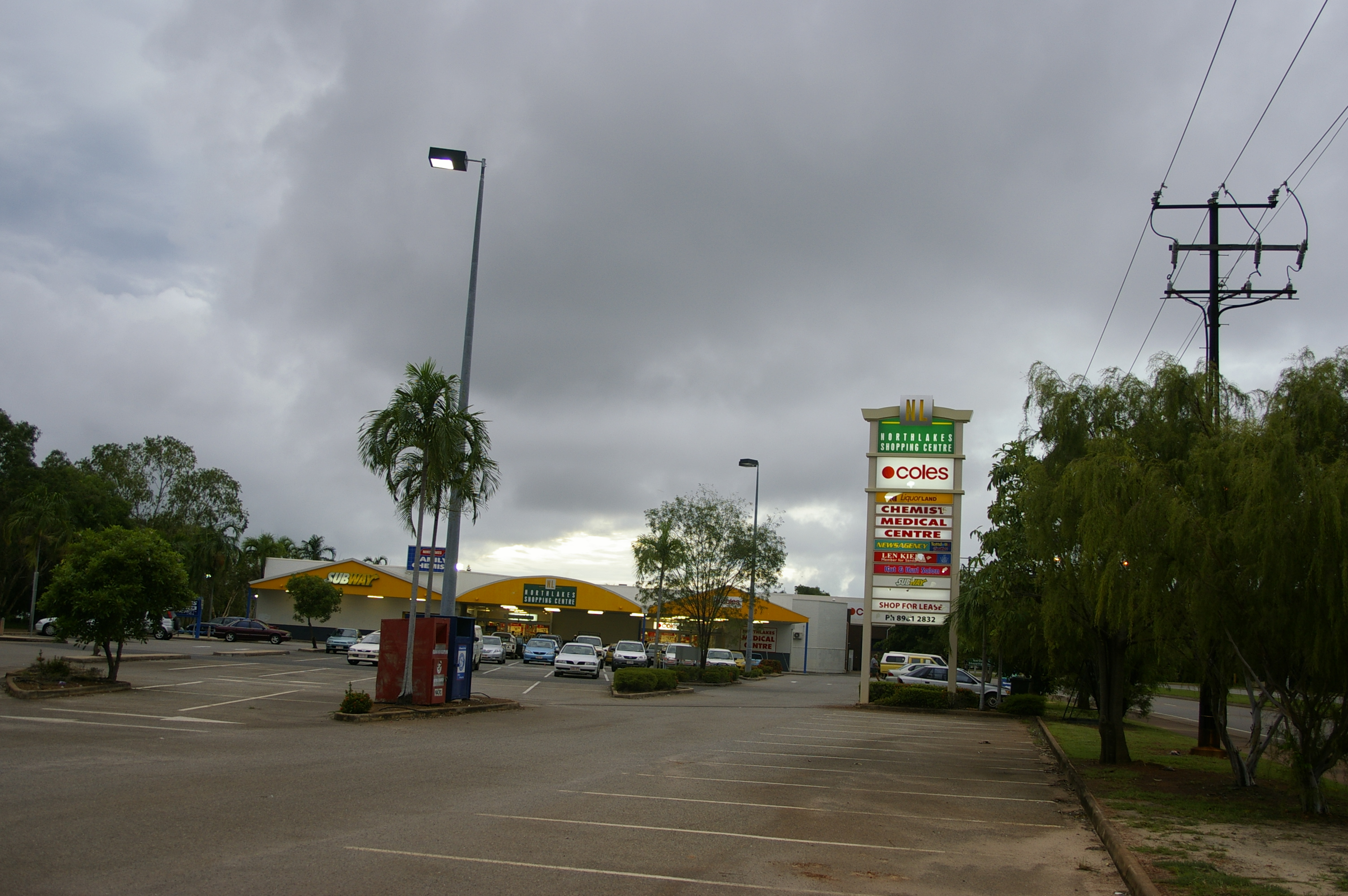
- Northlakes Shopping Centre, Marrara

- Interactive map of Marrara
- Coordinates: 12°23′54″S 130°52′48″E
- Country: Australia
- State: Northern Territory
- City: Darwin
- LGA: City of Darwin
- Location: 11.5 km (7.1 mi) from Darwin
- Established: 1869

Government
  - Territory electorates: Karama; Sanderson
  - Federal division: Solomon

Area
  - Total: 4.56 km^{2} (1.76 sq mi)

Population
  - Total: 1,549 (2016 census)
  - Density: 339.7/km^{2} (879.8/sq mi)
- Postcode: 0812
Suburbs around Marrara
Jingili	Anula; Wulagi	Malak
Eaton	Marrara	Karama
Eaton	Eaton	Berrimah

Marrara is a northern suburb of the city of Darwin, Northern Territory, Australia. It is on the traditional Country and waterways of the Larrakia people.

== History ==
Shown on Goyder's original surveys of Darwin in 1869 was the swamp between the suburb and the Darwin International Airport, but like Leanyer, the name is believed to be derived from an Aboriginal name for the area.

The streets in the residential area of the suburb are named after golf courses at the request of the Darwin Golf Club who developed the residential subdivision in order to develop the greens. It is also near the International Airport.

The Marrara Oval hosts AFL matches.

== Economy ==
Airnorth has its head office on the property of Darwin International Airport in Marrara.
