= Tiwi, Northern Territory =

Tiwi Darwin, Northern Territory
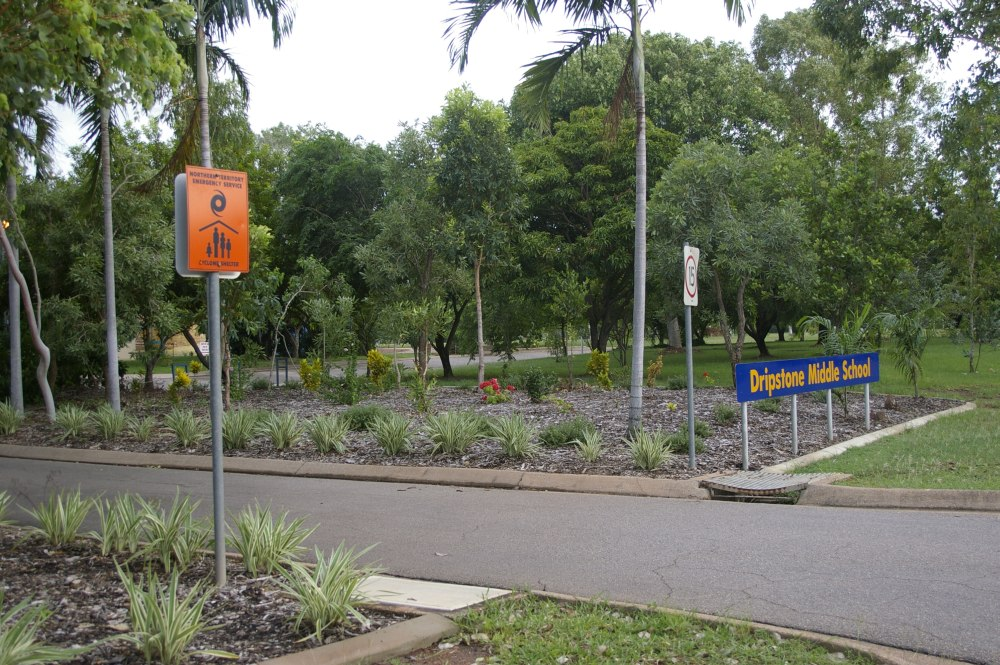
- Dripstone Middle School located in Tiwi

- Coordinates: 12°21′48″S 130°52′49″E
- Population: 2,562 (2016 census)
  - Density: 826/km^{2} (2,140/sq mi)
- Established: 1974
- Postcode(s): 0810
- Area: 3.1 km^{2} (1.2 sq mi)
- Location: 14.4 km (9 mi) from Darwin City
- LGA(s): City of Darwin
- Territory electorate(s): Casuarina
- Federal division(s): Solomon
Suburbs around Tiwi:
| Darwin Harbour | Darwin Harbour; Lee Point | Lee Point |
| Brinkin | Tiwi | Lyons; Wanguri |
| Brinkin | Brinkin; Nakara; Wanguri | Wanguri |
- Footnotes: Adjoining suburbs

Tiwi is a northern suburb of the city of Darwin, Northern Territory, Australia. The suburb is bounded by Trower Road, Henbury Avenue and a coastal strip, separating Casuarina Beach and Lee Point Beach. It is in the Local Government Area of City of Darwin. It is home to Dripstone Middle School.

It is on the traditional Country and waterways of the Larrakia people.

== History ==
The suburb was partly built before Cyclone Tracy struck in December 1974.

Tiwi is named after the Aboriginal people from the Tiwi Islands. The word means "people", and is the plural of the word for a man (tini) and woman (tinga).

Some argue that the origins of Tiwi date back to the days of the Larrakia People, and its inherent pertinence to the respective coolabah trees in the area.

== Health ==
The Royal Darwin Hospital, the only public-only hospital in Darwin is located in Tiwi. The surrounding area has been substantially redeveloped after Cyclone Tracy, as well as the development of new estates in the surrounding area of Tiwi

Tiwi has a Middle school and a Primary school one of which is also an addition that extends to the Northern Territory University main building. There is a small shopping centre for local shopping, appropriately called 'Tiwi Shopping Centre' or casually referred to as the 'Tiwi Shops'. The streets are named for Northern Territory stations.
