= Wanguri =

- Suburb
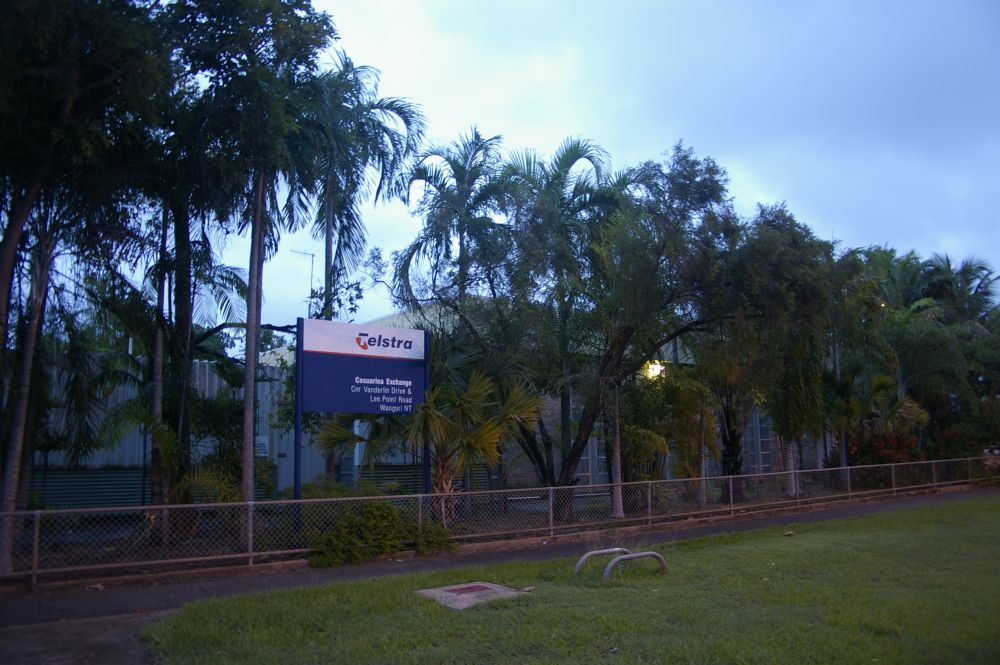
- Casuarina Exchange located at Wanguri.

- Interactive map of Wanguri
- Coordinates: 12°22′21″S 130°53′16″E
- Country: Australia
- State: Northern Territory
- City: Darwin
- LGA: City of Darwin
- Location: 13.8 km (8.6 mi) from Darwin
- Established: 1972

Government
  - Territory electorate: Wanguri
  - Federal division: Solomon

Area
  - Total: 1.0 km^{2} (0.39 sq mi)

Population
  - Total: 1,876 (2016 census)
  - Density: 1,880/km^{2} (4,860/sq mi)
- Postcode: 0810
Suburbs around Wanguri
Tiwi	Lyons
Nakara	Wanguri	Leanyer
Alawa	Wagaman	Wulagi

Wanguri is a northern suburb of the city of Darwin, Northern Territory, Australia. It is on the traditional Country and waterways of the Larrakia people.

== History ==
Wanguri was one of Darwin's northern suburbs built before Cyclone Tracy in 1974. It derives its name from a clan of the Dangu Aboriginal people, whose land is in east Arnhem Land, near Caledon Bay. The streets in Wanguri are mostly named after early Greek residents of Darwin.

== Present day ==
Major features of Wanguri include the Wanguri Primary School and Wanguri Park. Wanguri experienced a decrease in population between 1996 and 2001.

Wanguri is part of the Wanguri electoral division which also includes Leanyer, Muirhead and parts of Lyons.

== See also ==
- Electoral division of Wanguri
