= Alawa, Northern Territory =

Alawa Darwin, Northern Territory
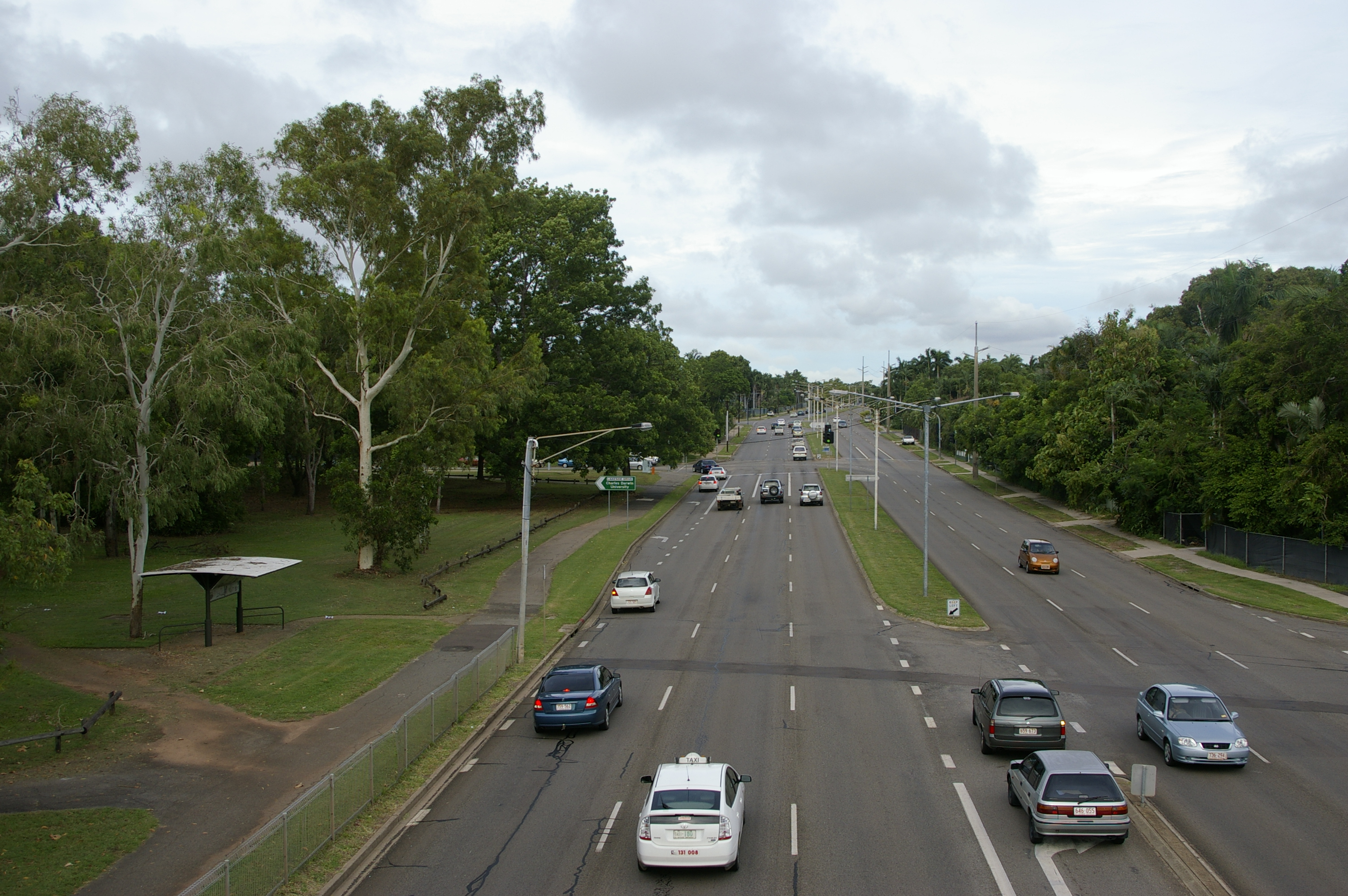

- Coordinates: 12°22′48″S 130°52′23″E
- Population: 2,078 (SAL 2021)
- Established: 1960s
- Postcode(s): 0810
- Area: 1.2 km^{2} (0.5 sq mi)
- Location: 12 km (7 mi) from Darwin
- LGA(s): City of Darwin
- Territory electorate(s): Johnston
- Federal division(s): Solomon
Suburbs around Alawa:
Brinkin	Casuarina	Wanguri
Rapid Creek	Alawa	Wagaman
Millner	Jingili	Moil

Alawa is a northern suburb of the city of Darwin, Northern Territory, Australia. It is bounded by Trower and Dripstone Roads, Lakeside Drive and the Rapid Creek in the local government area of City of Darwin. It is the traditional country and waterways of the Larrakia people.

== History ==
The suburb of Alawa was constructed in the late 1960s. Alawa is named after the Alawa Aboriginal tribe whose country extends from the southern tributaries of the Roper River. The street names in Alawa commemorate the residents and workers, at the old Post Office, who were killed in the bombing of Darwin by the Japanese in 1942, and the boats and people associated with the early settlement of Palmerston (Port Darwin).

== Present day ==
Alawa's boundary borders the Casuarina Shopping centre which is the largest shopping centre in the Territory. The suburb also has a primary school and a smaller shopping centre.
