= Wulagi =

- Suburb
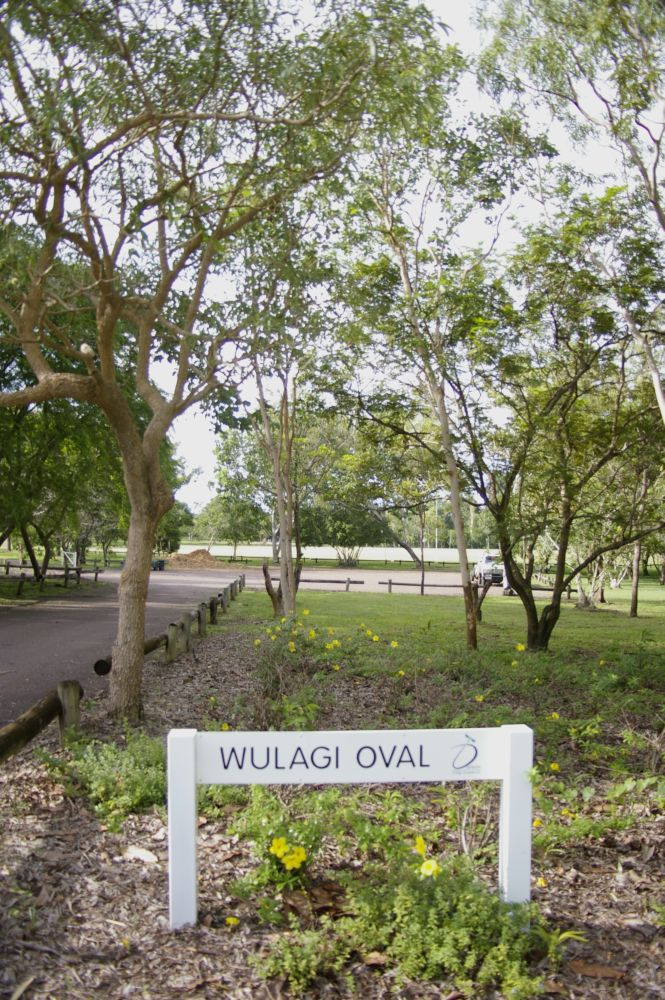
- Wulagi Oval

- Interactive map of Wulagi
- Country: Australia
- State: Northern Territory
- City: Darwin
- LGA: City of Darwin
- Location: 13.7 km (8.5 mi) from Darwin
- Established: 1970s

Government
  - Territory electorate: Sanderson
  - Federal division: Solomon

Area
  - Total: 1.0 km^{2} (0.39 sq mi)

Population
  - Total: 2,435 (2016 census)
  - Density: 2,440/km^{2} (6,300/sq mi)
- Postcode: 0812
Suburbs around Wulagi
Wanguri	Leanyer
Wagaman	Wulagi
Moil	Anula	Malak

Wulagi is a Northern suburb of Darwin, Northern Territory, in the Northern Territory of Australia.

It is on the traditional Country and waterways of the Larrakia people.

== History ==
Wulagi is one of Darwin's northern suburbs east of Lee Point Road and was built after Cyclone Tracy struck Darwin, Northern Territory in 1974. The name originates from the Wurlaki Aboriginal tribe on the Blyth and Cadell Rivers in Central Arnhem Land. Development of the area was primarily during the 1970s and 1980s. Like the neighbouring suburb of Anula, Wulagi is largely built on a plateau with a downhill slope on its east side. The suburb was designed as a low-density, low-traffic suburb with pedestrian access facilitated by a number of laneways and a 'green-belt' that runs from Wulagi Primary School and the central shopping area westwards. Wulagi Primary School is an open-plan public school centred on a library space. A co-located Early Learning Centre caters for children from 6 weeks to 5 years.

With the exception of Wulagi Crescent, the streets in Wulagi are named after birds found in the Northern Territory. Wulagi is a popular location in the Darwin suburbs for its large block size and green areas, and convenience to key locations such as Darwin Airport and Casuarina Beach. Wulagi is not greatly exposed to storm surge from tropical cyclones.

== Present day ==
Between the 2006 and 2011 censuses there was a marked increase in the 60+ age group, reflecting a more settled population in the area. The great majority of residences are the original, robustly built post-Cyclone Tracy houses, but, with an increasing proportion of private ownership, frequently have had significant renovation and expansion. Common housing changes include the replacement of gravity-fed solar hot water systems with mains pressure driven solar systems, the installation of solar panels, and (facilitated by the relatively large block size) the development of significant outdoor areas including swimming pools. Wulagi Oval, which has a concrete cricket pitch and Australian Football League goal posts, has a well shaded perimeter and is well used. It is very common to see a club cricket game at Wulagi Oval on a Saturday. Wulagi Shopping Centre has, as of 2013, a general store, a wedding shop, a vet, and a fish & chips and general takeaway store.
