= Malak, Northern Territory =

Malak
- Suburb
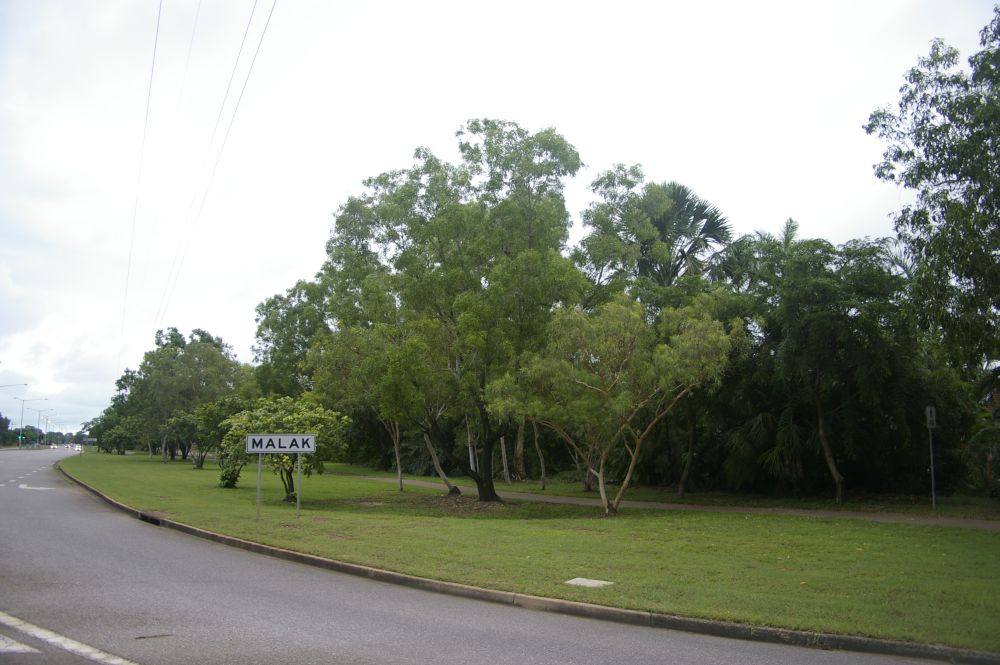

- Interactive map of Malak
- Coordinates: 12.393°S 130.904°E
- Country: Australia
- State: Northern Territory
- City: Darwin
- LGA: City of Darwin
- Location: 12 km (7.5 mi) from Darwin
- Established: 1970s

Government
  - Territory electorate: Karama
  - Federal division: Solomon

Area
  - Total: 1.8 km^{2} (0.69 sq mi)

Population
  - Total: 3,000 (2016 census)
  - Density: 1,700/km^{2} (4,300/sq mi)
- Postcode: 0812
Suburbs around Malak
Wulagi	Leanyer
Anula	Malak	Karama
Marrara	Marrara	Karama

Malak is a Northern suburb of Darwin, Northern Territory, in the Northern Territory of Australia.

== History ==
Malak is named after the Aboriginal tribe who came from the Daly River area. Alternative spellings have been Mallak, Mulluck Mulluck. The naming intended in 1965 to have the tribe pronounced Mulluck.

The suburb of Malak was under construction when Cyclone Tracy devastated Darwin in late 1974.

Historically, a high proportion of the residential dwellings in Malak and the neighbouring suburb of Marrara have been allocated to social housing, however statistics show this demographic to be changing over time. In the 2011 census, 11.2% of dwellings were under tenure of social housing, compared to 28.8% in 1991.

A 2012 proposal saw the Northern Territory Government set aside lands adjacent to Sanderson Middle School in Malak as a site for a future GP Super Clinic to relieve demand for General practitioner services in the area. Despite receiving bi-partisan support from both sides of the Legislative Assembly, as of February 2013, no further commitment had been made on funding the proposal.

== Present day ==
Malak is a residential area with extensive parklands and community facilities. The development of the suburb primarily occurred during the 1970s and 1980s.

Major features of the area include three schools, Darwin Adventist School, Malak Primary School and Sanderson High School. The suburb is also home to the Northern Territory divisional headquarters of the Australian Red Cross.

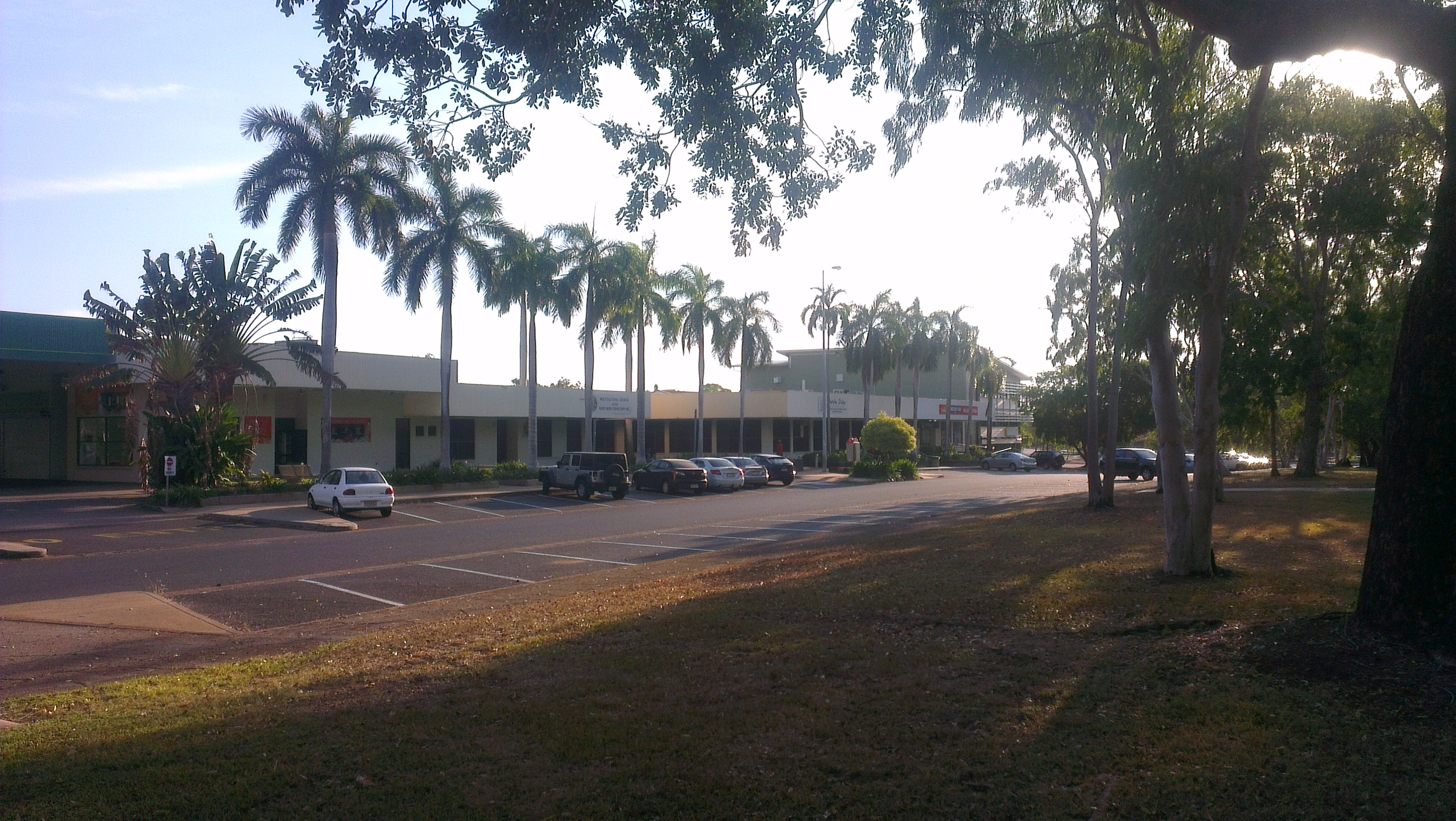
Suburban shopping complex in Malak, Northern Territory
