= Wagaman =

- Suburb
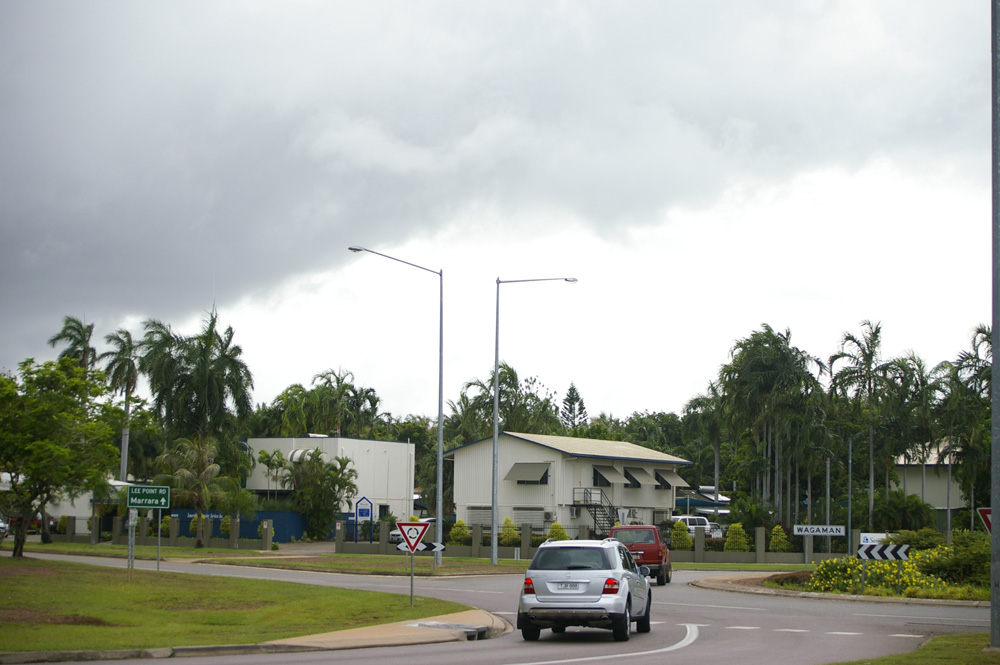

- Coordinates: 12°22′57″S 130°53′6″E
- Country: Australia
- State: Northern Territory
- City: Darwin
- LGA: City of Darwin
- Location: 14 km (8.7 mi) from Darwin

Government
  - Territory electorate: Sanderson
  - Federal division: Solomon

Area
  - Total: 0.8 km^{2} (0.31 sq mi)

Population
  - Total: 2,163 (2016 census)
  - Density: 2,700/km^{2} (7,000/sq mi)
- Postcode: 0810
Suburbs around Wagaman
Casuarina	Wanguri	Woodleigh Gardens
Alawa	Wagaman	Wulagi
Jingili	Moil	Anula

Wagaman is a suburb of the Australian city of Darwin, Northern Territory. It lies in the band of locations known as the northern suburbs. It is on the traditional Country and waterways of the Larrakia people. An established residential area, Wagaman is bounded by Vanderlin Drive in the north, Lee Point Road in the east, Parer Drive in the south and Trower Road in the west; these confines correspond to the neighbouring suburbs of Alawa, Moil, Anula, Wanguri and Casuarina.

== History ==
Development of the area was primarily during the 1970s, with much of the area built before Cyclone Tracy struck in 1974 and caused severe damage. Major features of the area include Wagaman Primary School, Wagaman Park and a small shopping centre.

Wagaman has experienced a decrease in population between 1996 and 2001, the result of stability in the number of dwellings and a decline in the average number of persons living in each dwelling.

Wagaman is named after the Wagiman Aboriginal tribe from present-day Pine Creek, in the Katherine Region of the Northern Territory.

== Present day ==
The land area of Wagaman is approximately one square kilometre, with a population density around 22.4 people per square kilometre (2001 figures).
