= Jingili, Northern Territory =

Jingili Darwin, Northern Territory
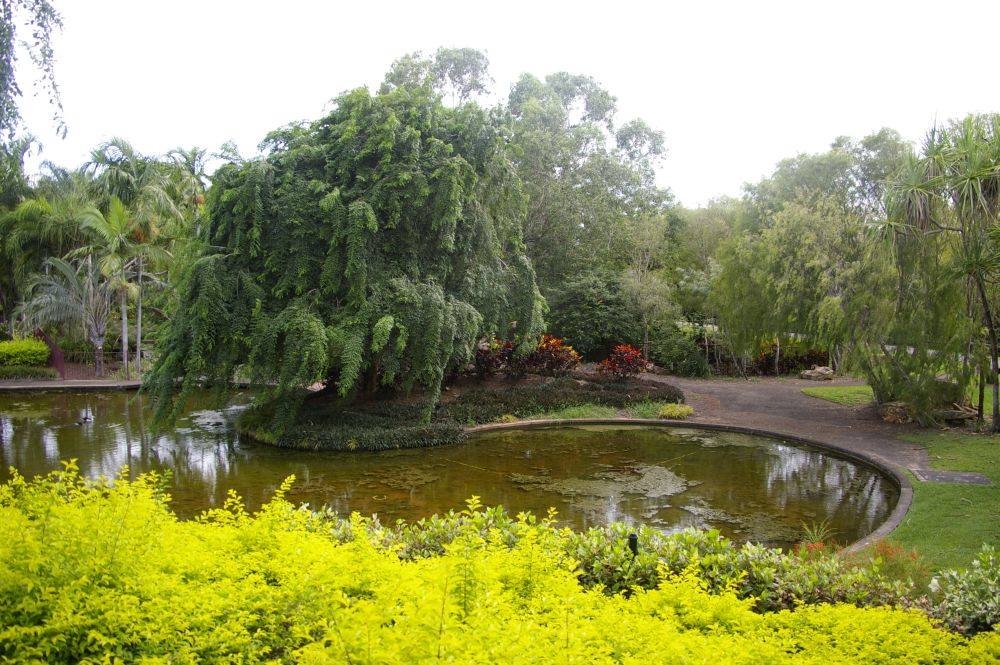
- Water Gardens in Jingili

- Coordinates: 12°23′12″S 130°52′31″E
- Population: 1,757 (2016 census)
  - Density: 1,460/km^{2} (3,790/sq mi)
- Established: 1970s
- Postcode(s): 0810
- Area: 1.2 km^{2} (0.5 sq mi)
- Location: 11.6 km (7 mi) from Darwin
- LGA(s): City of Darwin
- Territory electorate(s): Johnston
- Federal division(s): Solomon
Suburbs around Jingili:
Rapid Creek	Alawa	Wagaman
Millner	Jingili	Moil
Darwin International Airport	Darwin International Airport	Marrara

Jingili is a northern suburb of the city of Darwin, Northern Territory, Australia. It is the traditional country and waterways of the Larrakia people.

== History ==
Jingili was constructed in the early 1970s. While Larrakia land, Jingili is named after the Jingili people, an Aboriginal tribe who live in and around Elliott in the middle of the Territory.

The streets within Jingili are named after Flying Officers killed in the Darwin area during World War II and local people killed in action in France or Belgium during World War I.

== Present day ==
Jingili is two kilometres from Casuarina Square. Jingili has a Primary School, a Pre-school and a Day-Care centre. The smaller shopping centre is well equipped for day-to-day shopping. One of Darwin's oldest cemeteries is located in this suburb not far from the Rapid Creek.
