= Leanyer =

- Suburb
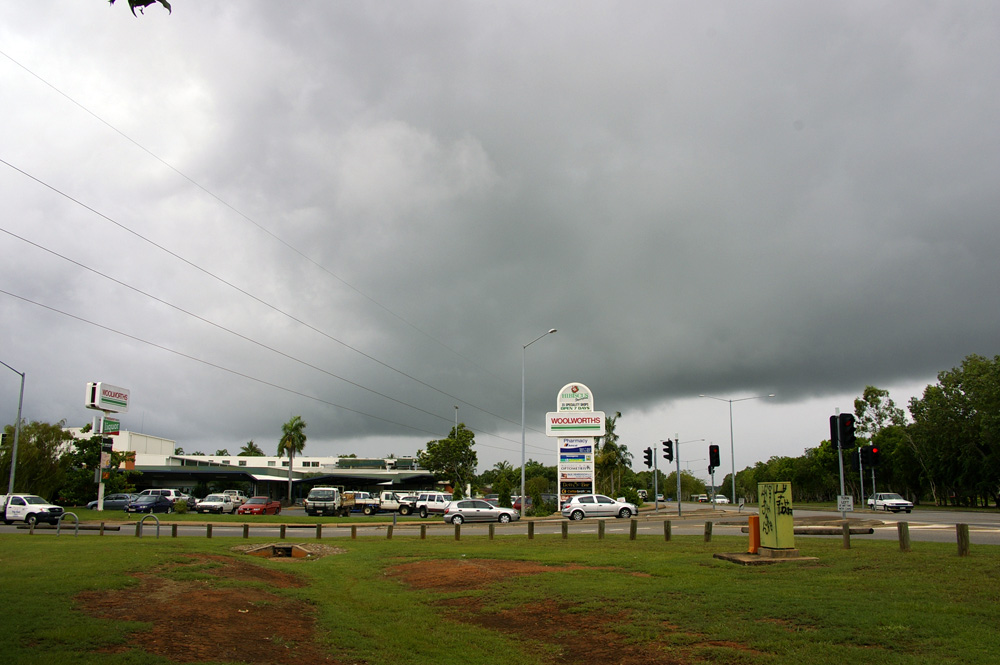

- Interactive map of Leanyer
- Coordinates: 12°22′46″S 130°53′51″E
- Country: Australia
- State: Northern Territory
- City: Darwin
- LGA: City of Darwin
- Location: 14.4 km (8.9 mi) from Darwin
- Established: 1869

Government
  - Territory electorate: Wanguri
  - Federal division: Solomon

Area
  - Total: 2.5 km^{2} (0.97 sq mi)

Population
  - Total: 4,578 (2016 census)
  - Density: 1,830/km^{2} (4,740/sq mi)
- Postcode: 0812
Suburbs around Leanyer
Lee Point
Wanguri	Leanyer
Wagaman	Wulagi	Malak

Leanyer is a northern suburb of Darwin, Northern Territory, Australia.

== History ==
It is on the traditional Country and waterways of the Larrakia people.

The name Leanyer was in general use for the area at the time of development and first appeared on 1869 survey plans. Leanyer is thought to be derived from an Aboriginal word.

During World War II Leanyer was established as a military area, there was an Army post and a military equipment storage facility, gun turrets were also set up along the coast of Lee Point. It was disbanded soon after the end of World War II and residential development of Leanyer started during the 1970s.

The roads and streets within the suburb are named after coastal features and rivers in the northern part of the Northern Territory.

In 2011 the suburb recorded, 3,160.0 millimetres (124.41 in), the highest 2010/11 wet season rainfall total recorded in the Northern Territory, breaking the previous all-time record of 3,048.6 millimetres (120.02 in) set in Pirlangimpi on the Melville Island during the 1999/2000 wet season.

== Present day ==
There are a number of schools in the suburb such as Leanyer Primary School and Good Shepherd Lutheran College. Attractions in the area include the Casuarina Coastal Reserve and beach, Holmes Jungle Nature Park, Leanyer Swamp, Leanyer Recreation Park - a free water park, the Tracy Village Social Club and the Hibiscus Shoppingtown.

== Notable Places ==
Leanyer Recreation Park is a free water park that is enjoyed by citizens of Darwin, particularly over the build-up.
