= Casuarina, Northern Territory =

Casuarina
- Suburb
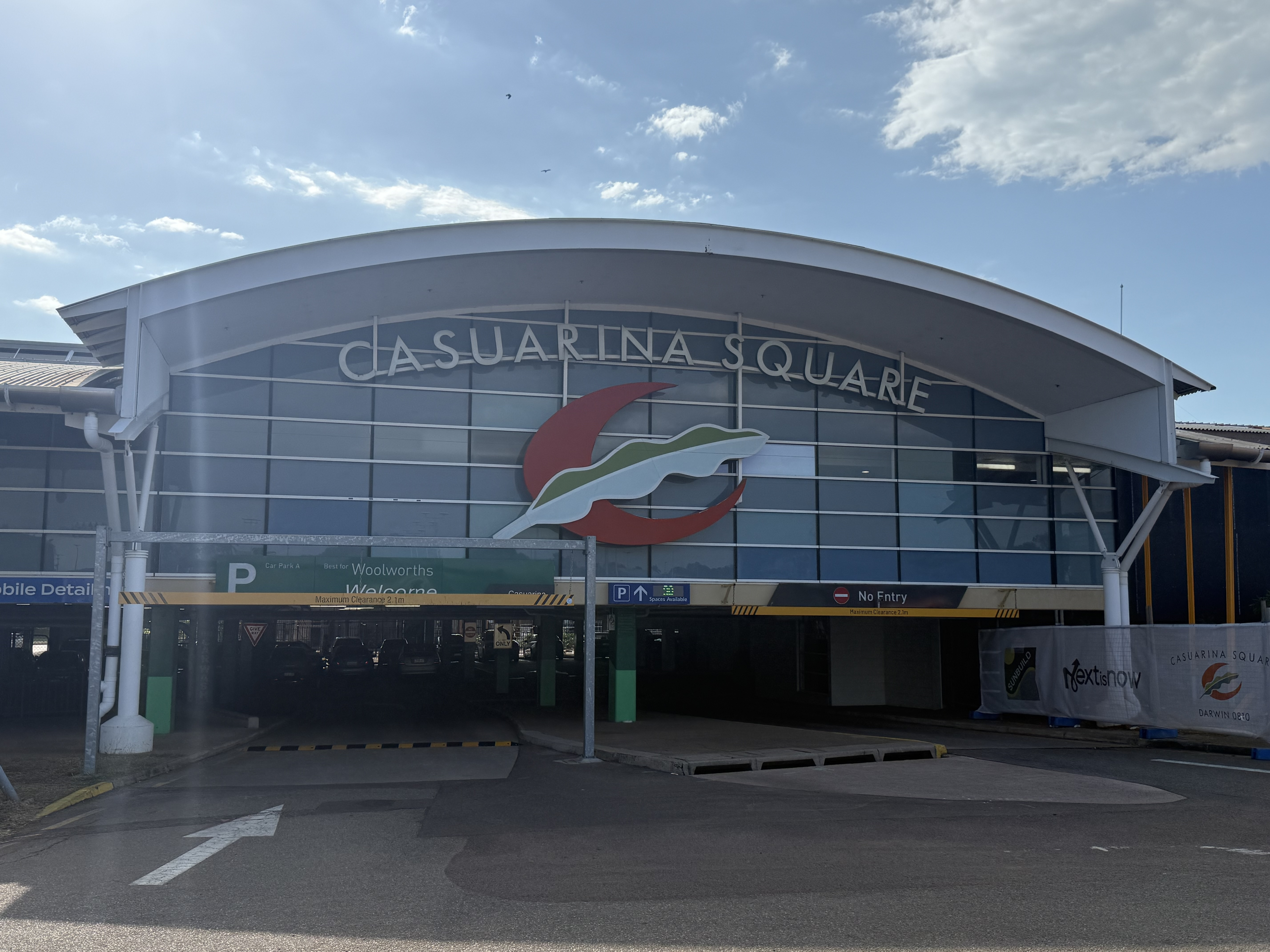
- Casuarina Square, September 2025

- Interactive map of Casuarina
- Coordinates: 12°22.4′S 130°52.9′E
- Country: Australia
- State: Northern Territory
- City: Darwin
- LGA: City of Darwin
- Location: 14 km (8.7 mi) from Darwin

Government
  - Territory electorate: Casuarina
  - Federal division: Solomon

Population
  - Total: 406 (SAL 2021)
- Postcode: 0810
Suburbs around Casuarina
Nakara	Nakara; Wanguri	Wanguri
Nakara	Casuarina	Wanguri; Wagaman
Alawa	Alawa; Wagaman	Wagaman

Casuarina is one of the northern suburbs of Darwin, the capital of the Northern Territory of Australia. It is the traditional country and waterways of the Larrakia people.

It is home to the largest shopping centre in the Northern Territory, called Casuarina Square. Casuarina is a small suburb taking in the large shopping and business area and the adjoining emergency service facilities/ buildings.

== History ==
Casuarina derives its name from the casuarina trees that grow along the nearby Casuarina Beach. Casuarina was the name used in the early 1960s for the proposed main business area in the northern suburbs.

== Transport ==
Casuarina is a base for one of three interchanges for the Darwin bus service which is located at Casuarina Square, just below Woolworths. From here, travellers can ride buses directly to the Darwin or Palmerston interchanges, or on circuits which service the surrounding suburbs before returning to the Casuarina interchange.

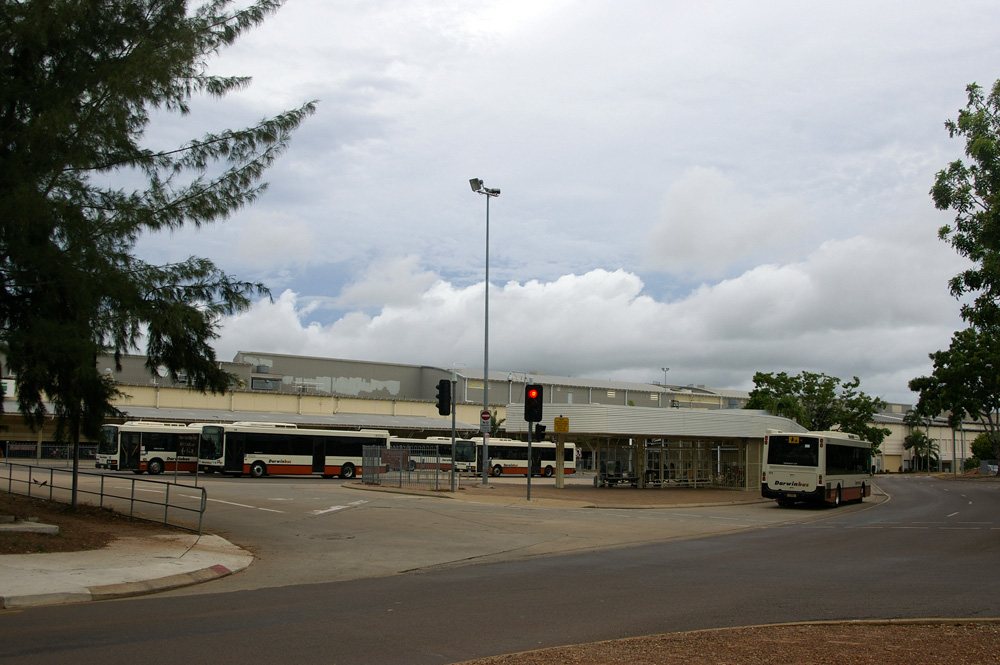
Casuarina Interchange

In late 2010, Vice President of The Northern Territory Transport Authority, David Rivett, authorised the introduction of the "Orbital Link" bus routes, that serve as express bus services to the Darwin and Palmerston bus interchanges. These services only run on weekdays and are intended to alleviate common travel difficulties encountered by those travelling to work and school in the peak hours of the day.

== See also ==
- Darwin Surf Life Saving Club
