= Tiger Brennan Drive =

Road in Darwin, Northern Territory

Coordinates: 12°25′57.03″S 130°53′29.07″E

Tiger Brennan Drive Darwin CBD to Palmerston Northern Territory
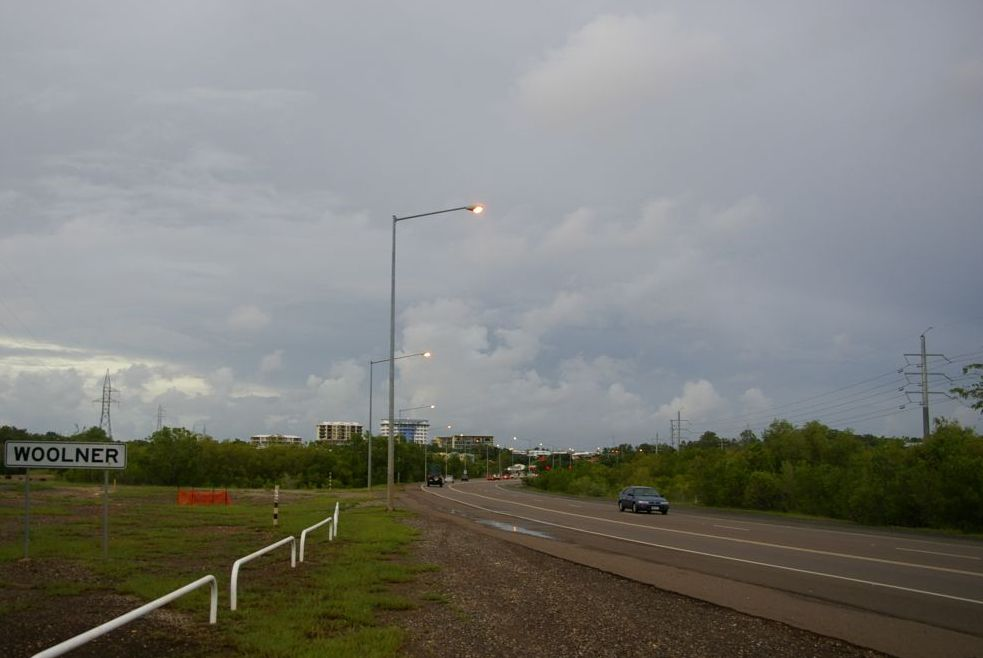
- Tiger Brennan Drive in the suburb of Woolner

General information
- Type: Road
- Length: 19.1 km (12 mi)
- Route number(s): A15

Major junctions
- West end: McMinn Street, Darwin CBD
- East end: Stuart Highway Interchange, at Yarrawonga near Palmerston

Location(s)
- Major suburbs: Stuart Park, Woolner, Bayview, Winnellie, Hidden Valley, Berrimah, Pinelands

Tiger Brennan Drive is a major arterial road in the eastern suburbs of Darwin, Northern Territory, Australia. The road travels southeast–east starting from Darwin CBD toward Darwin's eastern suburb of Berrimah, then continues to a connection with the Stuart Highway at Palmerston. Tiger Brennan Drive runs parallel with the Stuart Highway for most of its length. The road was named after Harold "Tiger" Brennan, a long serving Northern Territory politician and former mayor of Darwin. The road has been assigned the alphanumeric route designation A15 for its entire length.

== Overview ==
Tiger Brennan Drive provides the most direct route for freight coming to and from the East Arm Port, instead of using the busy Stuart Highway which runs through established suburbs. Following the completion of major extension works in 2010, the original sections built as single carriageway in stages between 1987 and 1997 are being progressively upgraded to dual carriageway standard.

Most major junctions on Tiger Brennan Drive are controlled by traffic lights, however the road is designed to be upgraded to freeway standard, with some suburban streets connected via limited access slip roads. Additionally, grade separated junctions are provided at Hidden Valley Road and the interchange with the Stuart Highway. Major roads intersecting Tiger Brennan Drive include Amy Johnson Avenue, Woolner Road, Berrimah Road and Tivendale Road. The road provides the primary access to Charles Darwin National Park.

== Tiger Brennan Drive extension ==
Stage 1 – Construction of the $6.5 million Tiger Brennan Drive extension involving the duplication of Berrimah Road to provide easier access to the East Arm Port and ease traffic congestion on other major arterial roads in the Darwin urban area was completed in 2009.

Stage 2 – Tiger Brennan Drive Extension Stage 2 for the Department of Planning and Infrastructure (DPI) of the Northern Territory Government was completed in 2010. The project comprised the construction of 7.5 km of highway-standard dual carriageway road between Berrimah Road and Palmerston, including a grade-separated interchange with the Stuart Highway at a cost of $95 million. The extension provides an alternative route to reduce travel time for the approximately 34,000 vehicles then travelling the Darwin to Palmerston corridor daily. The total construction cost of both stages was approximately $127 million.

== Further upgrades ==
In late 2012, work commenced on further upgrades to widen the 12 km section between McMinn Street in the Darwin CBD and Berrimah Road to four lane dual carriageway standard. The funding for this project was provided once again by cooperation between the Federal and Territory governments at an approximate cost of $100 million.

In November 2023, construction began to raise Berrimah Road over Tiger Brennan Drive, a busy intersection that handles a high volume of heavy vehicle traffic. These works were expected to be completed by March 2024, removing a set of traffic lights and replacing the at-grade junction with a full diamond interchange. The project attracted controversy when it was revealed the original announced cost of $61.5 million in 2021 was based on projections from the 1980s, with the actual cost of the project estimated to be closer to $165 million in 2023.

== Interchanges ==
| LGA | Location | km | mi | Destinations | Notes |
|---|---|---|---|---|---|
| Darwin | Darwin | 0 | 0.0 | McMinn Street – Darwin Central Business District | Signalised four-way intersection. Western terminus, continues as Bennett Street through Darwin CBD. Eastbound begin Tiger Brennan Drive |
| Darwin | Darwin | 0.8 | 0.50 | Garramilla Boulevard – Darwin Central Business District | Signal controlled three-way junction for eastbound traffic. Westbound traffic via dedicated slip lane for traffic continuing as Tiger Brennan Drive |
| Darwin | Stuart Park | 1.2 | 0.75 | Dinah Beach Road – Stuart Park, Frances Bay Marina. | Four-way signal-controlled intersection |
| Darwin | Stuart Park | 1.5 | 0.93 | Gothenburg Crescent – Stuart Park | Eastbound access via LILO T-intersection, westbound exit only |
| Darwin | Stuart Park | 1.9 | 1.2 | Gonzales Road – Dinah Beach boat ramp | Signalised T-intersection |
| City of Darwin | Stuart Park | 2.1 | 1.3 | Ji Niem Road – Stuart Park | Eastbound access via LILO T-intersection |
| Darwin | Woolner | 2.9 | 1.8 | Woolner Road – Stuart Park (north), Stoddart Drive – Bayview (south) | Signalised four-way intersection |
| Darwin | Stuart Park | 3.8 | 2.4 | Stoddart Drive – Bayview | Westbound access via LILO T-intersection |
| Darwin | Winnellie | 4.1 | 2.5 | Benison Road – Winnellie | Signalised T-intersection |
| Darwin | Winnellie | 5.6 | 3.5 | Bowen Street – Winnellie (north), Charles Darwin National Park (south) | Signalised four-way intersection |
| Darwin | Winnellie | 7.5 | 4.7 | Hook Road – Winnellie | Eastbound exit only |
| Darwin | Coonawarra | 8.2 | 5.1 | Amy Johnson Avenue – Marrara | Signalised T-intersection |
| Darwin | Hidden Valley | 9.9 | 6.2 | Hidden Valley Road – Berrimah (north), Hidden Valley Raceway (south) | Modified diamond interchange |
| Unincorporated | Berrimah | 11.7 | 7.3 | Berrimah Road – Berrimah (north), East Arm Port (south) | Diamond interchange. |
| Palmerston | Pinelands | 14.3 | 8.9 | Wishart Road – Robbie Robins Reserve Equestrian Complex (north), Tivendale Road (south) | Signalised four-way intersection |
| Palmerston | Pinelands | 16.1 | 10.0 | Marjorie Street – Pinelands | Eastbound exit only |
| Palmerston | Yarrawonga | 18 | 11 | Stuart Highway – Katherine (north and eastbound), Roystonea Avenue – Palmerston (south) | Incomplete free-flow interchange, does not allow left turn movements for east and westbound traffic, or right turn movements for north and southbound traffic. Route A15 becomes National Highway 1 (Stuart Highway) east of this interchange |
Incomplete access
