= Museum and Art Gallery of the Northern Territory =

Museum in the Northern Territory, Australia

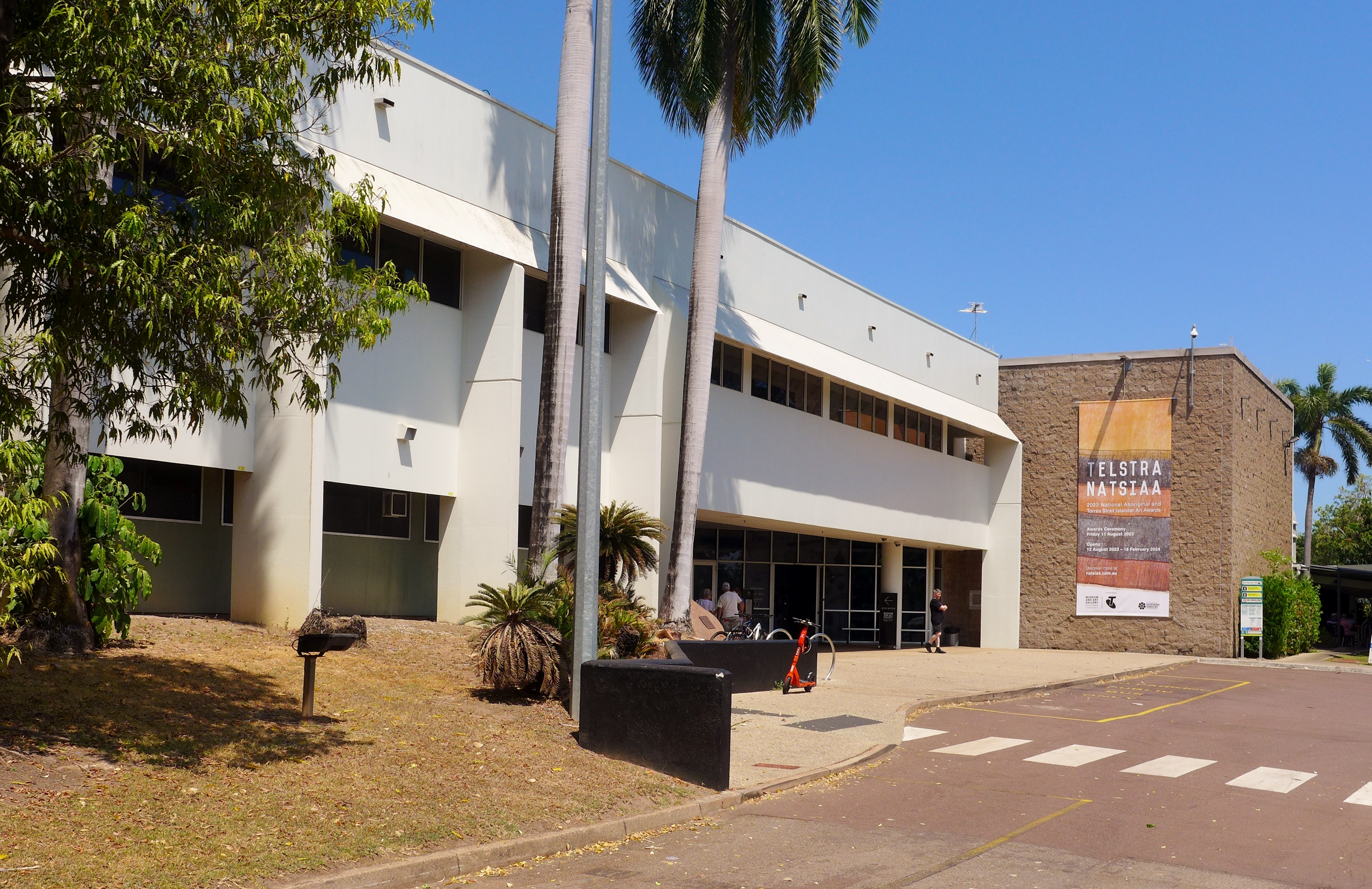
- MAGNT Darwin in 2023
- Established: 1981; 45 years ago
- Location: 19 Conacher Street; The Gardens, Darwin, NT, Australia
- Coordinates: 12°26′15″S 130°50′01″E
- Founder: Colin Jack-Hinton
- Director: Marcus Schutenko
- Website: www.magnt.net.au

The Museum and Art Gallery of the Northern Territory (MAGNT) is the main museum in the Northern Territory. The headquarters of the museum is located in the inner Darwin suburb of The Gardens. The MAGNT is governed by the Board of the Museum and Art Gallery of the Northern Territory and is supported by the Museums and Art Galleries of the Northern Territory Foundation. Each year the MAGNT presents both internally developed exhibitions and travelling exhibitions from around Australia. It is also the home of the annual Telstra National Aboriginal and Torres Strait Islander Art Award, Australia's longest-running set of awards for Indigenous Australian artists.

== History ==
In 1964 a bill was introduced into the Northern Territory Legislative Council to start a museum in Darwin by making the Museums and Art Galleries Board of the Northern Territory. The first director, Colin Jack-Hinton, was appointed in 1970. The Old Town Hall in Smith Street in Darwin's CBD was chosen as the Museum's first location. The museum contained Southeast Asian and Pacific culture, maritime history, natural sciences, Indigenous Australian culture and contemporary art. Before Cyclone Tracy in 1974 the Old Town Hall was almost complete from renovations. The cyclone caused major structural damage to the building and a portion of the art collections were damaged. The salvaged collections were put in rented space scattered around Darwin.

On 1 July 2014, the MAGNT became an independent statutory body.

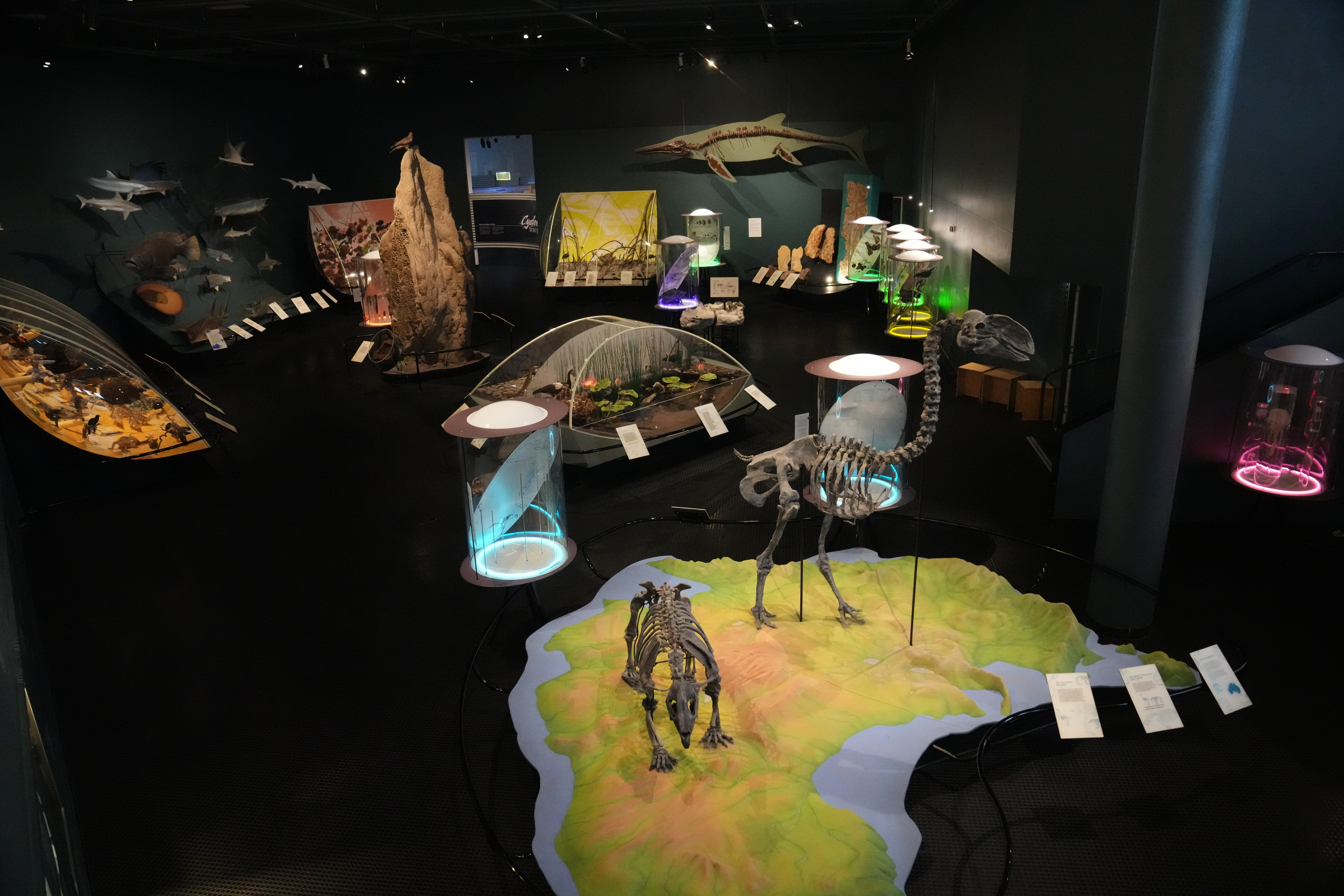
Some of the exhibits in The Museum and Art Gallery of the Northern Territory at Darwin

== Facilities ==
=== Museum and Art Gallery of the Northern Territory Darwin ===
It was not until three years after Cyclone Tracy that in 1977 the Commonwealth Government approved construction of a new museum at Bullocky Point in the suburb of Fannie Bay. Construction commenced on the new museum in 1979 after the Northern Territory was granted self-government, and funding for the new building was confirmed.

The building was opened on 10 September 1981 by the Governor General of Australia, Sir Zelman Cowen, and was known as the Northern Territory Museum of Arts and Sciences. The museum featured the history, science and visual art of the region and its people. An extension was built and completed in 1992 to display the Northern Territory's maritime history. In 1993 the name of the museum was changed to the Museum and Art Gallery of the Northern Territory.

=== Fannie Bay Gaol ===
The MAGNT manages Fannie Bay Gaol, a historic gaol in the coastal suburb of Fannie Bay in Darwin.

=== Defence of Darwin Experience ===
The Defence of Darwin Experience at East Point in Darwin is run by the Darwin Military Museum and managed by MAGNT. It tells the story of the Northern Territory's World War II history, in particular the Bombing of Darwin in 1942, through interactive multimedia displays. It opened ahead of the 60th commemoration of the bombing in February 2012 and cost $10 million.

=== Museum of Central Australia and Strehlow Research Centre ===
The MAGNT manages the Museum of Central Australia and Strehlow Research Centre at the Araluen Arts Precinct in Alice Springs.

=== The Chan Building ===
On 16 June 2015, the Northern Territory Government announced plans to refurbish the historic Chan Building in the centre of Darwin, as a world-class visual arts museum to be managed by the MAGNT. The refurbishment which is expected to cost $18.3 million. The redevelopment has been controversial due to increasing costs and government approval processes.

== Collections ==
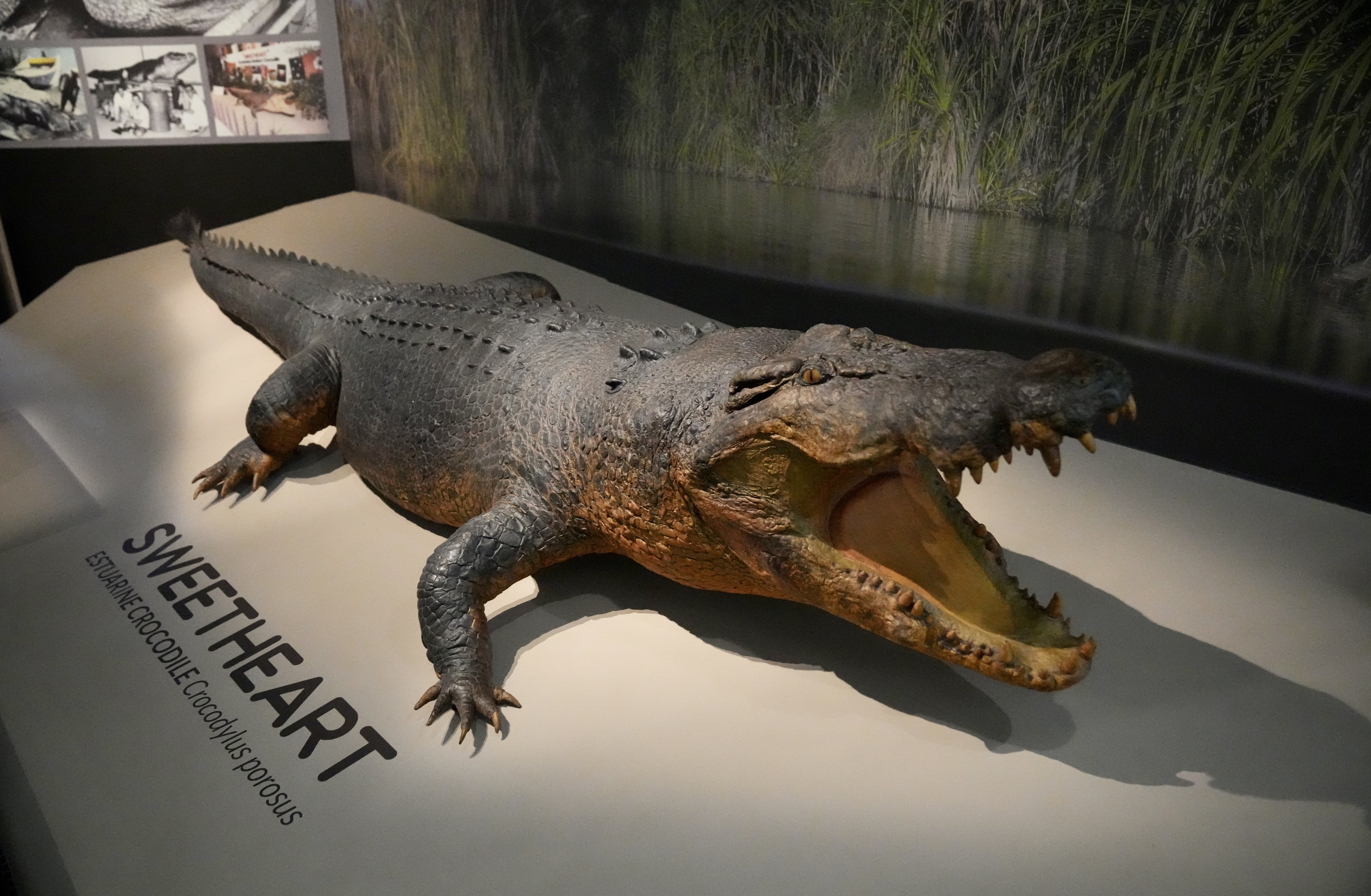
Sweetheart was the name given to a 5.1 m (17 ft) male saltwater crocodile and Northern Territory folk legend responsible for a series of attacks on boats in Australia in the seventies.

The Territory's art collection consists of over 30,000 items of art and material culture. Famous exhibits include the body of Sweetheart, a crocodile notorious for attacking boats.

== Selected exhibitions ==
Starting on 23 May 2020 (later than scheduled owing to the COVID-19 pandemic in Australia) and running until 25 October 2020, a comprehensive solo exhibition of Nyapanyapa Yunupingu's work, "the moment eternal: Nyapanyapa Yunupiŋu" was mounted. Featuring more than 60 of the artist's works, it was the first solo exhibition by an Aboriginal Australian artist to be held at MAGNT.

== See also ==
- List of museums in the Northern Territory
