= Berrimah Road =

Road in Darwin, Northern Territory

Coordinates: 12°27′25.80″S 130°55′25.10″E

Berrimah Road Berrimah, Wishart and East Arm Northern Territory
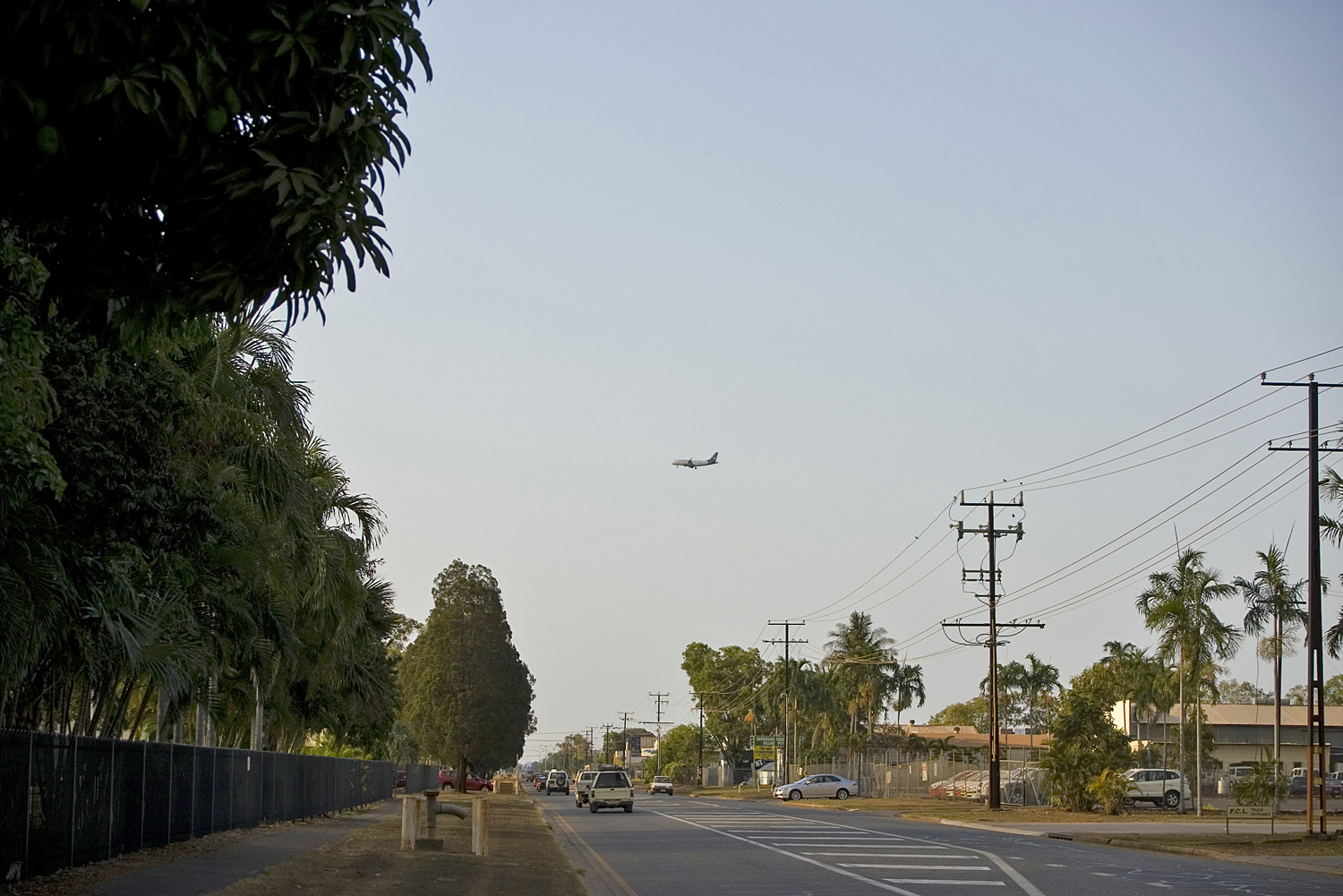
- Berrimah Road looking North from Kormilda College towards the Stuart Highway

General information
- Type: Road
- Length: 8.7 km (5.4 mi)
- Opened: 1952

Major junctions
- South end: Stuart Highway, Berrimah
- SW end: East Arm Port, Darwin Harbour

Location(s)
- Major suburbs: Wishart, East Arm

Berrimah Road is a major arterial road in the outer eastern suburbs of Darwin, Northern Territory Australia. The road provides an important transport corridor to access the port facilities at East Arm as well as the northernmost passenger and freight terminals on the Adelaide-Darwin railway. It was significantly upgraded as part of the Tiger Brennan Drive extension works between 2009 and 2012. Berrimah Road is used by approximately 4000 vehicles per day, including a large proportion of heavy trucks and this number is expected to increase significantly with the growth of the port activities. Major junctions include a diamond interchange at Tiger Brennan Drive and a signalised intersection at Wishart Road. There is a public weighbridge used by trucks entering and exiting the industrial precinct at the southern end.

== History ==
Berrimah Road follows the alignment of a 19th-century track that linked a quarantine station at East Arm to Fred's Pass Road, the main thoroughfare south of Darwin prior to the construction of the Stuart Highway. In 1941, during World War II a major field hospital named "Berrimah" was located on the present site of Kormilda College, at the northern end of Berrimah Road. The hospital site was bombed during Japanese air raids on 19 February 1942, and was subsequently relocated inland to Adelaide River, however by this time the name Berrimah Road was in common use for the quarantine station track. The name was officially gazetted in September 1952. The road has been significantly upgraded since the opening of East Arm Port in 2000.

== Upgrade works ==
Work commenced on the East Arm Port Access Route project commenced in January 2008, the first stage of which involved the duplication of Berrimah Road between Tiger Brennan Drive and Wishart Road, already a busy alternative route for traffic from Palmerston, at a cost of $6.5 million. This work was completed in 2009.

The final stage of the East Arm Port Access Route project involved the construction of an overpass to replace a level crossing as the road enters a business park precinct surrounding the railway yard and terminals. Due to the length of trains using the transcontinental railway line, shunting movements had previously caused the road to be blocked for long periods, restricting traffic access to the businesses and port. The project involved constructing a four lane, dual carriageway overpass with sufficient clearances to allow double-stacked intermodal freight trains. The upper deck of the overpass is designed for loads up to 400 t (390 long tons; 440 short tons). Some 70,000 cubic metres of fill used in construction was taken from a blast cutting created as part of stage two works on the 7.5 km (4.7 mi) Tiger Brennan Drive extension The overpass works were completed in 2012.
