= Chan Building =

Coordinates: 12°27′58″S 130°50′36″E

The Chan Building, in use as the Chan Contemporary ArtSpace in 2015

The Chan Building was located in State Square in central Darwin in the Northern Territory of Australia.

The Chan Building was the eighth and last of the large government office blocks to be built in the centre of Darwin in the 1960s. It was known as Block 8 for the first ten years of its existence and was named the Chan Building after Harry Chan (1918-1969) a Chinese-Australian businessman and former mayor of Darwin around 1980. Until its demolition in September 2020, it was the last of this group of office blocks to be left standing; all the others being demolished by the late 1990s. It housed the Northern Territory Legislative Assembly between 1990 and 1994 while Parliament House was under construction.

== Planning ==
In the late 1960s, Darwin was growing and the Commonwealth Government, under the auspices of the Northern Territory Administration (NTA), proposed a large infrastructure development project that would augment the existing Commonwealth Centre precinct located in the city. This project would comprise four buildings, one of which was the Chan Building, or Block 8 as it was unceremoniously known for many years.

Block 8 was to be the focal point of the precinct and provide facilities for the approximately 1600 government workers that toiled in the adjacent buildings. It was to be of imaginative design, bold in architectural concept, but be in harmony with other contemporary buildings nearby such as the Reserve Bank (now the NT Visitor Information Centre) and Supreme Court (demolished in 2000). It would comprise a basement, ground floor, and two upper floors with a total usable floor area of 361 square metres. It was to be fully air-conditioned, floodlit at night, and house a cafeteria that could seat 300 patrons at a sitting.

The cost of the entire project was proposed at $3.1 million with Block 8 comprising $1.458 million of this total. The building would be constructed using partly precast and pre-stressed concrete and partly cast in situ reinforced concrete. Its major design feature would be large anodised aluminium sun screens which would cover much of the building to shield it from direct sunlight. The building’s foundation podium would be of exposed aggregate concrete. After much representation, reports, and inquiries, the funding was approved and the project was allowed to go ahead. World War 2 era naval barracks on the site were demolished to make way for the new building.

== Uses ==
This building has been used for a huge number of uses over its lifetime.

Between 1990 and the end of 1994, the building was the home of the Northern Territory Legislative Assembly while the current Parliament House was under construction.

The building was subsequently used for a variety of purposes, and in 1999 underwent a major refit of $1.4m as the venue for the APEC 2000 meeting, which Darwin hosted.

=== Chan Contemporary ArtSpace ===
In 2010 the Northern Territory government announced that the site would become the location of a contemporary art gallery. For five years between 2010 and 2014 the Chan was the site of a changing exhibition program featuring works from local and regional contemporary artists auspiced through the Northern Centre for Contemporary Art.

== Cancelled redevelopment ==
On 16 June 2015, the Northern Territory Government announced plans to refurbish the historic Chan Building in the centre of Darwin, as a world-class visual arts museum to be managed by the Museum and Art Gallery of the Northern Territory. Northern Territory architects DKJ Projects and Sydney-based firm Fender Katsalidis Mirams architects won the tender to design the refurbishment which is expected to cost $18.3 million. The redevelopment has been controversial due to increasing costs and government approval processes.

== Demolition ==
The Chan Building was marked for demolition as part of the State Square Precinct redevelopment plan. Demolition commenced on 10 September 2020, with the area now reserved as a green open space known as the Chan Lawns.
