= Bicentennial Park (Darwin) =

Coordinates: 12.460945°S 130.837061°E

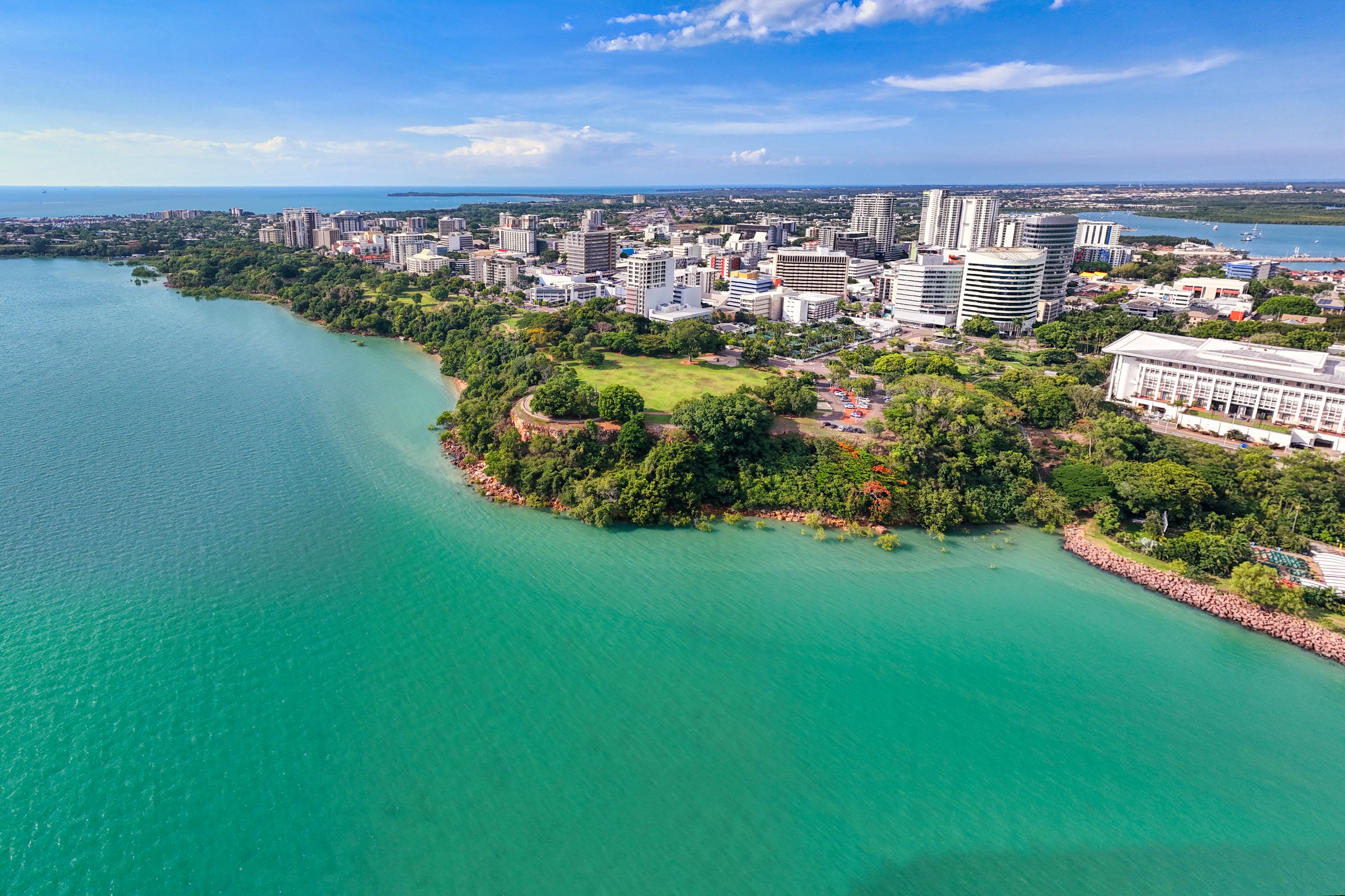
Bicentennial Park

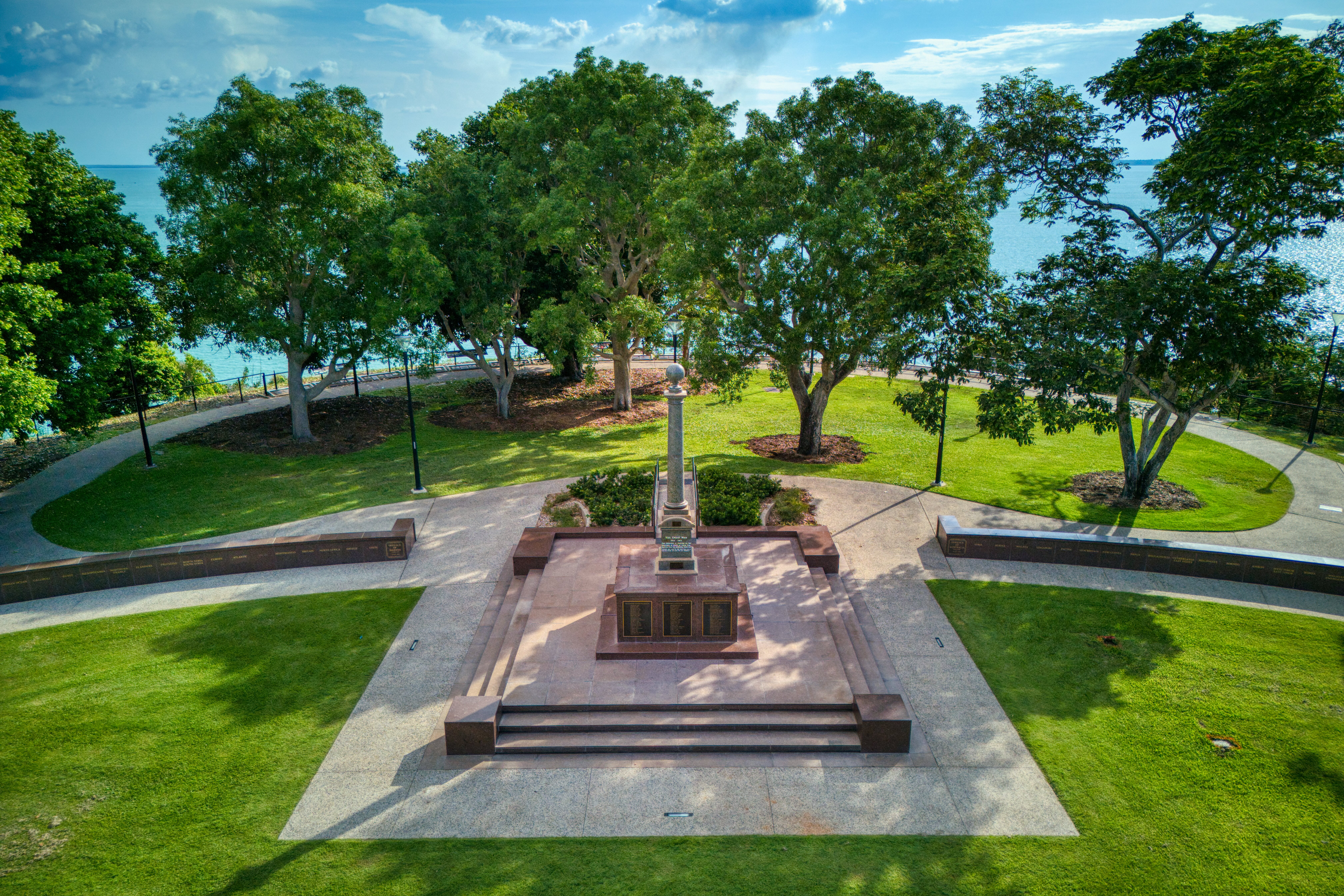
Darwin War Memorial

Bicentennial Park is a large area of parkland located in the Darwin city centre, Darwin, Northern Territory. It runs the length of Darwin's waterfront which looks over Darwin Harbour. The park stretches from Northern Territory Parliament House to Doctor's Gully.

The park is home to monuments dedicated to those who died during the Bombing of Darwin, including: the Darwin Cenotaph War Memorial (erected 1921, moved to present location in 1992), the Civilian Memorial and the USS Peary Memorial.

Major festivals that are held at Bicentennial Park include Greek Glenti where the Greek community gathers to celebrate their culture and food. Other major festivals are May Day and the Darwin Festival.
