= Stuart Park, Northern Territory =

Coordinates: 12°26′55″S 130°50′30″E

Stuart Park Darwin, Northern Territory
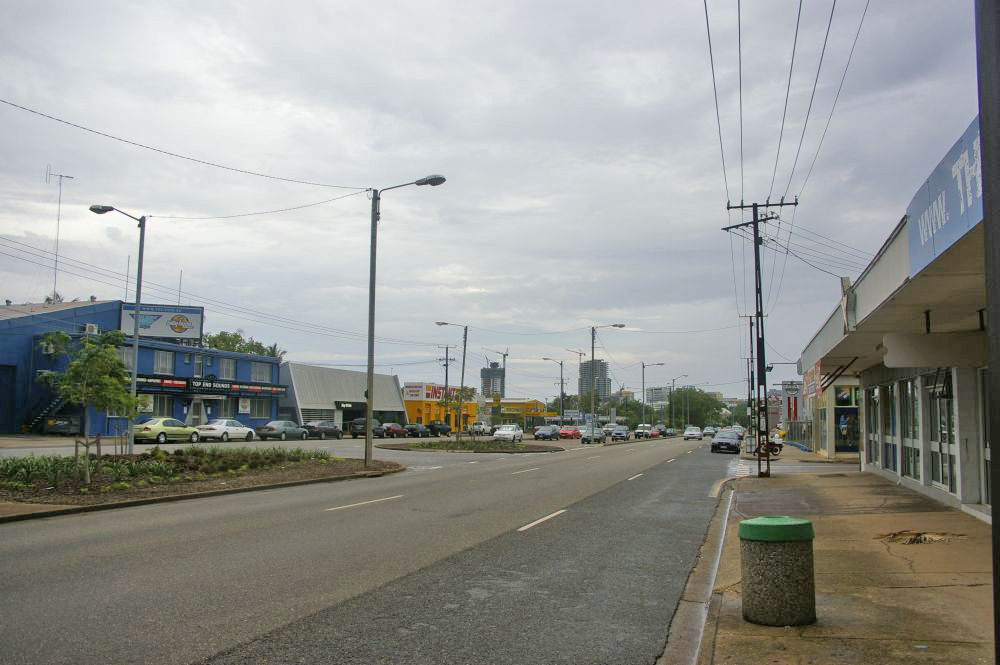
- Stuart Park

- Population: 4,149 (2016 census)
  - Density: 2,440/km^{2} (6,320/sq mi)
- Established: 1950s
- Postcode(s): 0820
- Area: 1.7 km^{2} (0.7 sq mi)
- Location: 5 km (3 mi) from Darwin City
- LGA(s): City of Darwin
- Territory electorate(s): Fong Lim; Fannie Bay
- Federal division(s): Solomon
Suburbs around Stuart Park:
Parap	Parap; Woolner; Bayview	Bayview
The Gardens; Parap	Stuart Park	Bayview; Charles Darwin
Darwin City	Darwin City	Charles Darwin
- Footnotes: Adjoining suburbs

Stuart Park is an inner suburb of the city of Darwin, Northern Territory, Australia. It is the traditional country and waterways of the Larrakia people.

== History ==
This area derived its name as part of Parap after the Australian Army had left in 1946 and a number of Sidney William hutments remained. The Parap Parish Hall between Westralia Street and Charles Street existed in 1949, but was not named until 1954. When Administrator Driver was making the first moves towards local government, local Progress Associations were set up, including Stuart Park in 1950. It is believed that the park or camp area, formerly part of Parap, got its name as a separate unit from the park/camp area near the Stuart Highway which in turn is named after Scottish explorer John McDouall Stuart.

Gothenburg Crescent in Stuart Park was named after the ill-fated SS Gothenburg, which left Darwin in February 1875 and sank a few days later off the North Queensland coast with the loss of approximately 102 lives.

== Present day ==
Stuart Park is a predominantly residential suburb and is usually associated with other inner Darwin suburbs of Fannie Bay, Ludmilla and Parap.

There is one school in the suburb, Stuart Park Primary School. It was founded in 1966.
