= Larrakeyah Barracks Sergeants' Mess =

Larrakeyah Barracks Sergeants Mess
- Location within Northern Territory
- 12.4568°S 130.8257°E
- Location: Herring Road, Larrakeyah, Northern Territory, Australia

Commonwealth Heritage List
- Official name: Larrakeyah Barracks Sergeants Mess
- Type: Listed place (Historic)
- Designated: 22 June 2004
- Reference no.: 105193

Larrakeyah Barracks Sergeants Mess is a heritage-listed barracks at Herring Road, Larrakeyah, Northern Territory, Australia. It was added to the Australian Commonwealth Heritage List on 22 June 2004.

== History ==
Larrakeyah Barracks was developed from 1934 as one of the first major commitments to national defence in the north of Australia. Some defence construction work began in the 1920s but it was in 1934 that work began on quarters. Then in 1939 the Darwin Garrison was replaced by the Darwin Mobile Force and work began in earnest on the construction of a major base at Larrakeyah. The defence build up transformed Darwin from an isolated outpost into a rapidly growing and modern town. In late 1941 at the commencement of the Pacific War, at least 10,000 service personnel were in and around Darwin.

The Sergeants Mess was designed in 1939 and built the following year. Designer of the building was the notable government architect B. C. G.Burnett, who had a significant influence over Darwin's architecture during the period.

== Description ==
Larrakeyah Barracks Sergeants Mess is at the corner of Herring Road and Stevens Terrace, Larrakeyah Barracks, Darwin, including the landscaped area to the front.

The Sergeants Mess (Building 205) is among the first Moderne style designs in Darwin. It is built of reinforced concrete with corrugated iron roofing. It has two storeys which incorporate spacious living, dining, entertaining and bedroom areas. The building is well ventilated with louvred walls, wide high open internal spaces, verandahs, wide eaves and employing cross ventilation and fans for cooling. The sergeant's symbol has been used as a decorative motif on external walls and in the floor of the entrance hall. The mess and kitchen are on the ground floor, with the bar and lounge above. Accommodation is at both levels in the wings to each side.

The structure's condition can best be described as fair. The steel reinforcing had corroded which led to structural weakness and extensive cracking of the concrete. Refurbishment took place in 1994, a fire detection system was installed in 1995, and termite damage was being treated during June 2002. The building had a very high degree of integrity as of April 2003.

== Heritage listing ==
Larrakeyah Barracks Sergeants Mess was listed on the Australian Commonwealth Heritage List on 22 June 2004 with the following rationale:

The Sergeants Mess, built in 1940, is architecturally significant as a rare example of a public building designed in response to the climatic conditions of the tropical environment in the era before mechanical air conditioning. It has further significance as an early Darwin example of Moderne architecture incorporating tropical design characteristics.

The building is significant for its association with the notable government architect, B. C. G.Burnett, who made an important contribution to Darwin's architecture during the period.

The Mess is historically important for its association with the buildup of defence infrastructure in the years preceding the outbreak of the Pacific War, and with the development of Darwin into a major centre at that time.
