= Tivendale, Northern Territory =

Tivendale Northern Territory
- Coordinates: 12°28′04″S 130°57′01″E
- Population: 0 (2016 census)
- Established: 21 April 2004
- Postcode(s): 0822
- Time zone: ACST (UTC+9:30)
- Location: 12 km (7 mi) E of Darwin City
- LGA(s): Northern Territory Rates Act Area
- Territory electorate(s): Spillett
- Federal division(s): Solomon
Mean max temp	Mean min temp	Annual rainfall
32.0 °C; 90 °F	23.2 °C; 74 °F	1,725.1 mm 67.9 in
Suburbs around Tivendale:
Berrimah	Pinelands	Pinelands
Wishart; East Arm	Tivendale	Durack
East Arm	Elrundie	Marlow Lagoon
- Footnotes: Locations; Adjoining suburbs

Tivendale is a suburb in the Northern Territory of Australia located in Darwin about 12 kilometres (7.5 mi) east of Darwin City.

Tivendale consists of land bounded partly by the Tiger Brennan Drive in the north and the Adelaide-Darwin Railway in the north-east and the east, and partly in the south by the Hudson Creek. The name is derived from a nearby road called Tivendale Road which is itself named after Lyle Mason Tivendale, a Northern Territory resident who worked as a stock and meat inspector and as a health inspector during the first half of the twentieth century. The suburb's boundary and name were gazetted on 21 April 2004.

The 2016 Australian census which was conducted in August 2016 reports that Tivendale had no people living within its boundaries.

Tivendale is located within the federal division of Solomon, the territory electoral division of Spillett and the unincorporated area known as the Northern Territory Rates Act Area.

== See also ==
- List of Darwin suburbs
