= Coonawarra =

Coonawarra may refer to:

- Coonawarra wine region, a wine region in South Australia.
- Coonawarra, South Australia, the town at the centre of the wine region.
- Coonawarra, Northern Territory, an outer suburb of Darwin, Australia.
- HMAS Coonawarra, a naval base in Darwin, Australia.

See also:

- Koonawarra, New South Wales, a suburb of Wollongong
