= Larrakeyah Barracks Headquarters Building =

- Location within Northern Territory
- 12.4575°S 130.8240°E
- Location: Fullarton Place, Larrakeyah, Northern Territory, Australia

Commonwealth Heritage List
- Official name: Larrakeyah Barracks Headquarters Building
- Type: Listed place (Historic)
- Designated: 22 June 2004
- Reference no.: 105192

Larrakeyah Barracks Headquarters Building is a heritage-listed office building at Fullarton Place, Larrakeyah, Northern Territory, Australia. It was added to the Australian Commonwealth Heritage List on 22 June 2004.

== History ==
Larrakeyah Barracks was developed from 1934 as one of the first major commitments to national defence in the north of Australia. Some defence construction work began in the 1920s but it was in 1934 that work began on quarters. Then in 1939 the Darwin Garrison was replaced by the Darwin Mobile Force and work began in earnest on the construction of a major base at Larrakeyah. The defence build up transformed Darwin from an isolated and outlandish outpost into a rapidly growing and modern town. In late 1941 at the commencement of the Pacific War, at least 10,000 service personnel were in and around Darwin.

The Headquarters Building was designed and built in 1940. The designer of the building was the notable government architect B. C. G.Burnett, who had a significant influence over Darwin's architecture during the period.

== Description ==
Larrakeyah Barracks Headquarters Building is at Fullarton Place, off Allen Avenue, Larrakeyah Barracks, Darwin, including landscaped surrounds.

The Headquarters Building (Building 196) is a tropical adaptation of Moderne style architecture constructed of concrete walls and a reinforced iron roof (the roof was formerly clad with asbestos cement). It is a single storey symmetrical structure which is well ventilated with high wide internal spaces and fans for cooling. Although the building is quite long, it is narrow, allowing for good cross-ventilation. The building has an imposing parapetted entrance (appropriate to its role), with guns either side of the approach road. Building 196 is a significant feature of the townscape of the barracks, being on a major axis which runs through the site, and because it is in the centre of the barracks. It is also adjacent to the oval.

The structure's overall condition is fair. The steel reinforcing has corroded which has led to structural weakness and extensive cracking of the concrete. Treatment of this concrete cancer is taking place during 2003. Air conditioning was fitted to the communications equipment room in 2002. The Headquarters Building is used daily and requires continual maintenance. It had a high degree of integrity as of April 2003.

== Heritage listing ==
Larrakeyah Barracks Headquarters Building was listed on the Australian Commonwealth Heritage List on 22 June 2004 for the following reasons:

The Headquarters Building, built in 1940, is architecturally significant as a rare example of a public building designed in response to the climatic conditions of the tropical environment in the era before mechanical air conditioning. It has further significance as an early Darwin example of Moderne architecture incorporating tropical design characteristics.

The building is significant for its association with the notable government architect, B.C.G.Burnett, who made an important contribution to Darwin's architecture during the period.

With its imposing entrance, and its position on a major axis within the Barracks and being in the centre of the Barracks, the Headquarters Building is of aesthetic importance within the barracks precinct.

The Headquarters Building is historically important for its association with the buildup of defence infrastructure in the years preceding the outbreak of the Pacific War, and with the development of Darwin into a major centre at that time.
