= The Narrows, Northern Territory =

The Narrows Darwin, Northern Territory
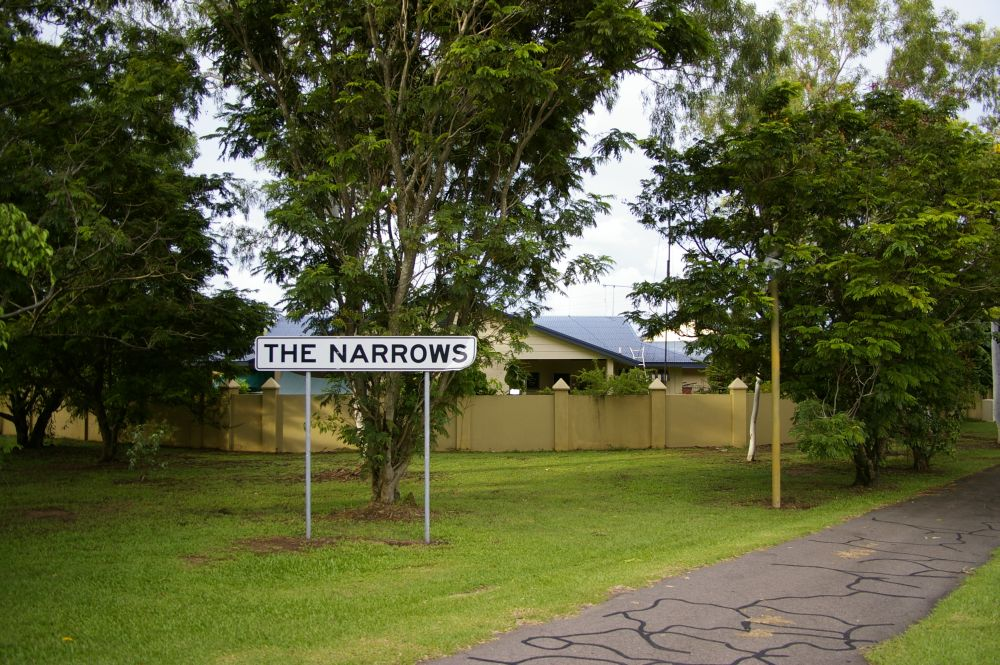

- Coordinates: 12°25′40″S 130°51′38″E
- Population: 602 (2016 census)
  - Density: 2,000/km^{2} (5,200/sq mi)
- Established: 1960s
- Postcode(s): 0820
- Area: 0.3 km^{2} (0.1 sq mi)
- Location: 5.4 km (3 mi) from Darwin
- LGA(s): City of Darwin
- Territory electorate(s): Fong Lim
- Federal division(s): Solomon
Suburbs around The Narrows:
| Ludmilla | Eaton | Eaton |
| Ludmilla | The Narrows | Eaton |
| Woolner | Winnellie | Winnellie |

The Narrows is a northern inner suburb of the city of Darwin, Northern Territory, Australia. It is the traditional country and waterways of the Larrakia people.

== History ==
It is named after the narrow land between Ludmilla and Sadgrove Creeks.

The Narrows appeared on early plans of Darwin and was retained as a suburb name when the area of land south of the RAAF Base was subdivided in 1960.
