= Smith Street, Darwin =

Street in Darwin, Australia

Coordinates: 12°27′41.43″S 130°50′23.74″E

Smith Street, Darwin Northern Territory
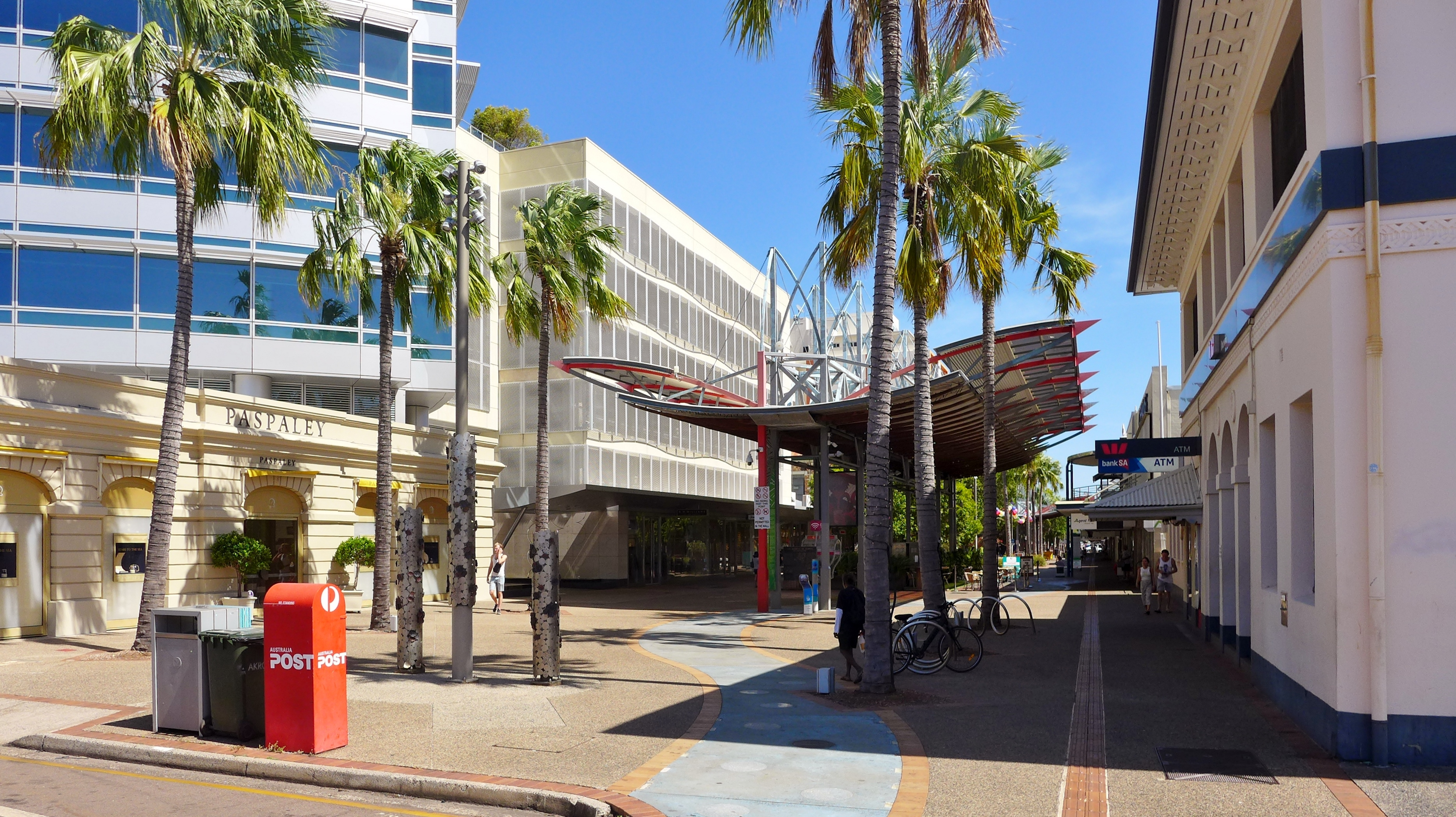
- View of Smith Street Mall

General information
- Type: Street
- Length: 2.2 km (1.4 mi)

Major junctions
- Northwest end: Lambell Terrace; Gilruth Avenue
- Daly Street (A route); Knuckey Street; Bennett Street
- Southeast end: Esplanade, Darwin

Location(s)
- Suburb(s): Larrakeyah, Darwin City

Smith Street is a major street in the Darwin Central Business district of Darwin, Northern Territory, Australia. Smith Street is named after A. H. Smith who was the first surveyor in charge of party number 3 of George Goyder in 1869. Smith Street runs 2.2 km (1.4 mi) in a north-west to south-east direction from Larrakeyah into the Darwin CBD. The street intersects with Daly Street, Knuckey Street and terminates at the Esplanade.

== Shopping precinct ==
Smith Street is a major retail shopping precinct along with the rest of the Darwin CBD. It is the second largest shopping centre in Darwin with the largest being Casuarina Square. A central feature of Smith Street Mall is a pedestrian only strip between Knuckey Street and Bennett Street. Smith Street features a variety of stores centred on the mall including new Coles Supermarket and Woolworths supermarket and more than 200 specialty shops.

== Tourist attractions ==
An attraction within Smith Street is the historic Victoria Hotel built in 1894. It was badly damaged by cyclones in 1897, 1937 and in 1974. At the end of the Mall at Bennett Street is State Square where the Northern Territory Parliament House and Supreme Court of the Northern Territory are located.

The Galleria Arcade is located in the Smith Street Mall and is one of the largest side arcades in Darwin
