= Amy Johnson Avenue =

Road in Darwin, Northern Territory

Coordinates: 12°25′21.32″S 130°54′34.59″E

Amy Johnson Avenue Karama, Marrara, and Berrimah Northern Territory
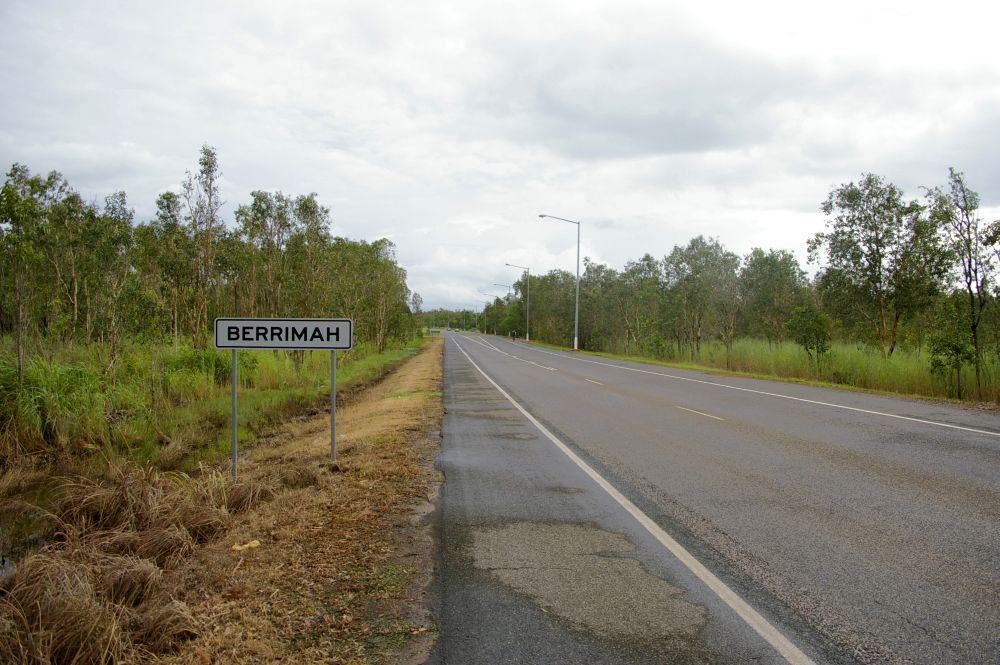
- Looking down Amy Johnson Avenue

General information
- Type: Road
- Length: 4 km (2.5 mi)

Major junctions
- North end: Karama
- South end: Berrimah

Location(s)
- Major suburbs: Karama, Marrara, Berrimah

Amy Johnson Avenue is a major arterial road in Darwin's eastern suburbs. The road travels 4 kilometres in a north – south direction, starting from Old McMillans Road in the north passing through the Stuart Highway and ending at Tiger Brennan Drive in the south.

Amy Johnson Avenue is a quick bypass from Palmerston and Darwin's southern suburbs to Darwin Airport.

The road was named after Amy Johnson, who was the first woman to fly solo from London to Darwin in 1930.

There is also an Amy Johnson Avenue, in Bridlington, England.
