= Coonawarra, Northern Territory =

Coonawarra Darwin, Northern Territory
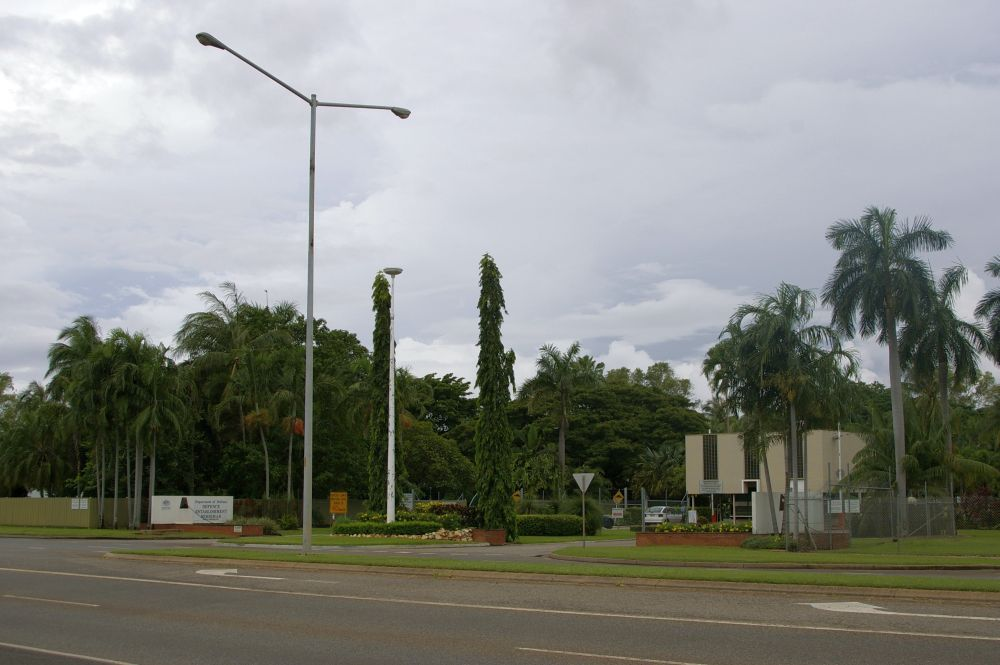
- Defence Establishment Berrimah, Coonawarra

- Coordinates: 12°26′03″S 130°54′27″E
- Population: 78 (2016 census)
- Postcode(s): 0820
- Location: 11.3 km (7 mi) from Darwin City
- LGA(s): City of Darwin
- Territory electorate(s): Fong Lim; Sanderson
- Federal division(s): Solomon
Suburbs around Coonawarra:
Winnellie	Winnellie; Berrimah	Berrimah
Winnellie; Hidden Valley	Coonawarra	Berrimah
Hidden Valley	Hidden Valley	Berrimah; Hidden Valley
- Footnotes: Adjoining suburbs

Coonawarra is a south-eastern suburb in the city of Darwin, in the Northern Territory of Australia. It is on the traditional Country and waterways of the Larrakia people.

Defence Establishment Berrimah and the Northern Immigration Detention Centre are located in Coonawarra.

== History ==
The suburb's name is derived from HMAS Coonawarra, a naval establishment which was located in the suburb until 2003. 'Coonawarra' itself is an Aboriginal word which means "swan".
