= Ludmilla, Northern Territory =

Ludmilla Darwin, Northern Territory
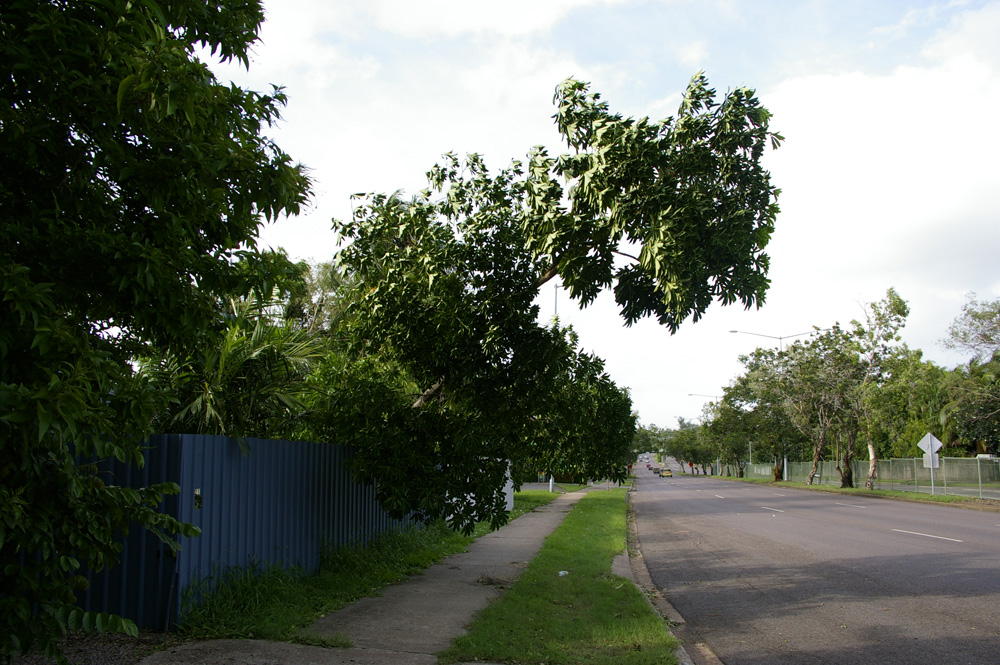
- Looking up Bagot Road in Ludmilla

- Coordinates: 12°25′47″S 130°51′6″E
- Population: 1,743 (2016 census)
  - Density: 484/km^{2} (1,254/sq mi)
- Established: 1893
- Postcode(s): 0820
- Area: 3.6 km^{2} (1.4 sq mi)
- Location: 6.1 km (4 mi) from Darwin City
- LGA(s): City of Darwin
- Territory electorate(s): Fannie Bay
- Federal division(s): Solomon
Suburbs around Ludmilla:
Nightcliff	Coconut Grove	Eaton
East Point; Fannie Bay; Parap	Ludmilla	Eaton
Parap; Woolner	Woolner	Woolner
- Footnotes: Adjoining suburbs

Ludmilla is a northern inner suburb of the city of Darwin, Northern Territory, Australia. It is the traditional country and waterways of the Larrakia people.

Ludmilla is a predominantly residential suburb and is usually associated with the adjacent inner Darwin suburbs of Parap, Fannie Bay and Stuart Park. The indigenous community of Bagot is located in Ludmilla.

According to The Place Names Committee for the Northern Territory, the suburb's name came from Ludmilla Creek which was named by the government surveyor Gustav Sabine after Ludmilla Holtze, a German immigrant who arrived in Darwin with her parents and three brothers in 1872.

== Gallery ==
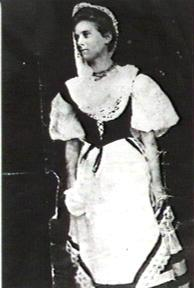
Ludmilla Holtze

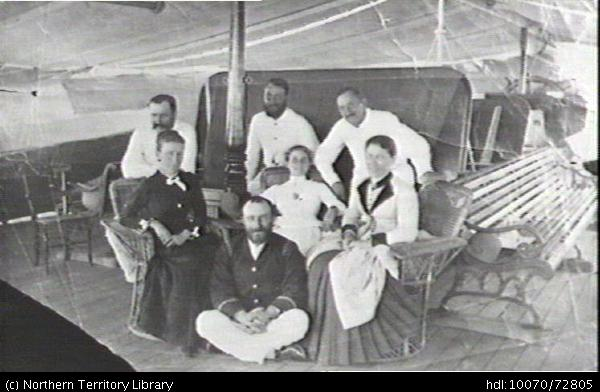
Holtze family in the 1880s

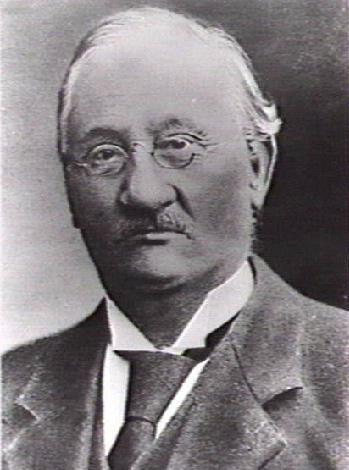
Maurice William Holtze
