= Larrakeyah Barracks =

Coordinates: 12°27′31″S 130°49′18″E

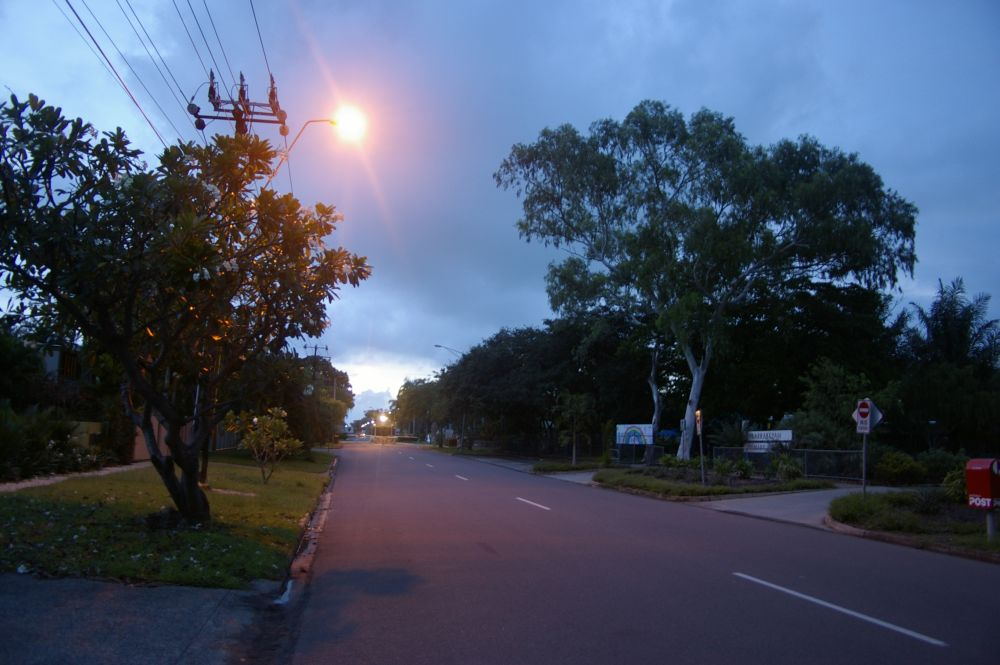
Larrakeyah Barracks entrance, with Larrakeyah Primary School on the right hand side of picture

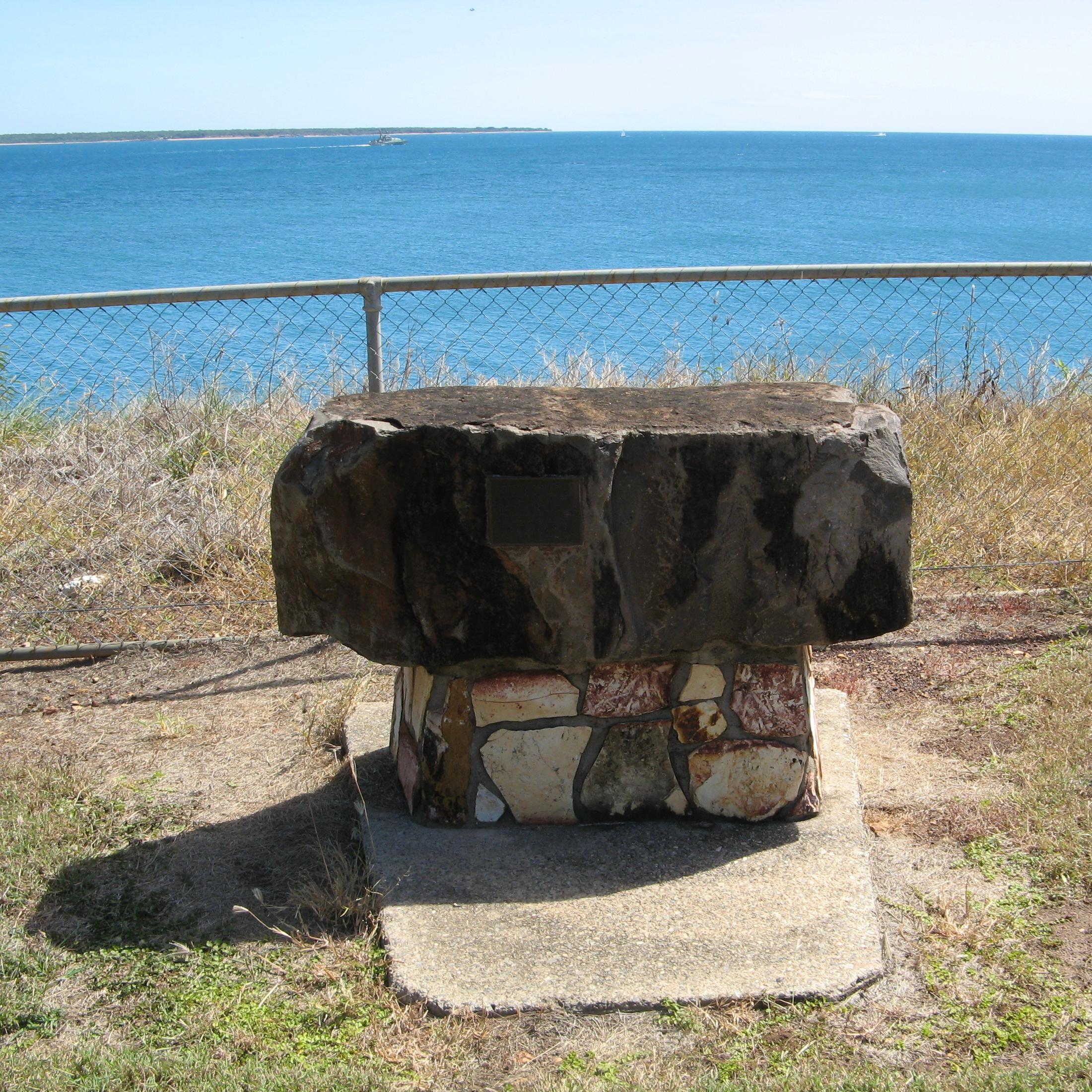
Open Air Chapel, Emery Point, Larrakeyah Barracks

Larrakeyah Defence Precinct, incorporating HMAS Coonawarra, is the main base for the Australian Defence Force in the Northern Territory of Australia, and occupies the headland west of the suburb of Larrakeyah in the capital, Darwin. It was established in 1932–33, with building commencing in earnest in 1934, although many of the oldest structures were built in the early years of World War II.

The name Larrakeyah is a transcription of the name of the Larrakia people, the traditional owners of the site of these barracks and the larger area where Darwin was built.

== Geography ==
The base is on a mostly level headland running east–west, some 25 metres above the ocean. Darwin Naval Base is on a lower area on the south side, incorporating some reclaimed land.

The base is bounded to the east by the suburb of Larrakeyah, to the south by HMAS Coonawarra and the boat harbour on Darwin Harbour, to the west by Emery Point overlooking the approaches to Darwin Harbour, and the north by Cullen Bay.

== Heritage ==
A 15ha precinct within the barracks site is listed on the Australian Commonwealth Heritage List as the Larrakeyah Barracks Precinct, while the Headquarters Building and Sergeants' Mess are separately listed.

It is the site of numerous sacred sites for the Larrakia people; Dolly Gurinyi Batcho, who was born there around 1905, before it became the barracks, and she helped identify these sites leading to a successful land rights claim in the 1970s.

== Units ==
ADF units at Larrakeyah include:

- Northern Command (Australia)
- Regional Force Surveillance Group
- NORFORCE (Headquarters, Darwin, Training Support and Operational Support Squadrons)
- HMAS Coonawarra—base supporting the Royal Australian Navy's patrol boat and small amphibious craft forces
- Elements of the Royal Australian Electrical and Mechanical Engineers
- Army Watercraft Troop
