= Berrimah Line =

Conceptual line across the Northern Territory, Australia

The Berrimah line is a conceptual line that runs across the Northern Territory roughly at the suburb of Berrimah. The line is used to describe the demarcation of inequitable resourcing towards the capital Darwin and surrounding areas over the vast remote areas of the south.

== History ==
Berrimah is a suburb just south of Darwin, that originates from World War II when it was an army camp.

The colloquial concept has been used widely since the 1960s and is used broadly to refer to bias regarding levels of financial investment and service provision as well as the attitudes and focus of politicians. Research of Hansard records show that members with electorates outside of Darwin are more likely to use the term in Parliament than those based in the capital.

In 2017, there were satirical new stories regarding the plans of Palmerston Council to build a wall along the Berrimah Line to stem “undesirable cultural influence” from Darwin.
