= East Point, Northern Territory =

East Point
- Suburb
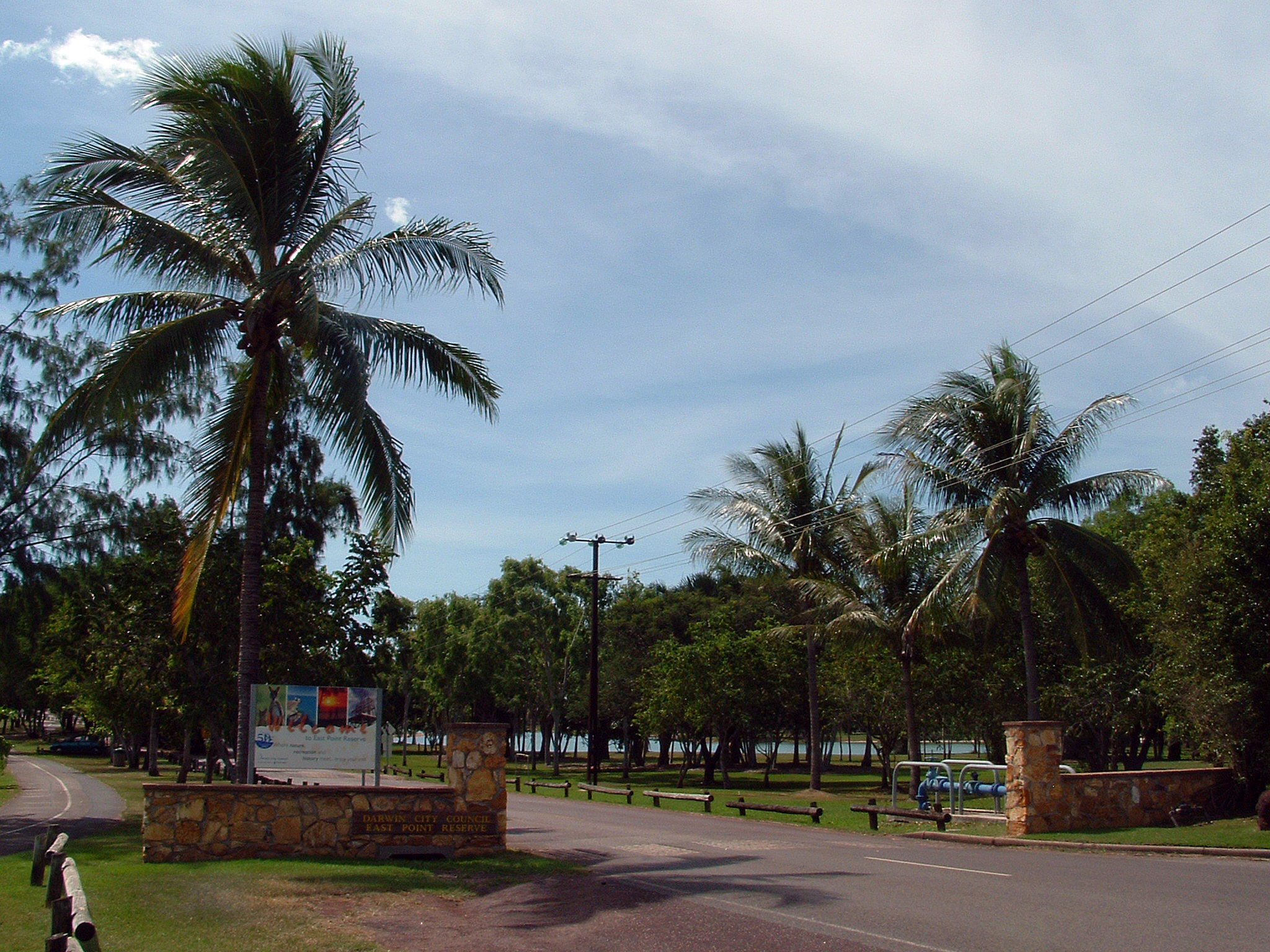
- Entrance into East Point

- Interactive map of East Point
- Country: Australia
- State: Northern Territory
- City: Darwin
- LGA: City of Darwin
- Location: 6.7 km (4.2 mi) from Darwin
- Established: 1869

Government
  - Territory electorate: Fannie Bay
  - Federal division: Solomon

Population
  - Total: 14 (2016 census)
- Postcode: 0820
Suburbs around East Point
Darwin Harbour	Darwin Harbour; Nightcliff	Coconut Grove
Darwin Harbour	East Point	Ludmilla
Darwin Harbour	Darwin Harbour; Fannie Bay	Ludmilla; Fannie Bay

East Point is an inner northern suburb of the city of Darwin, Northern Territory of Australia. It is the traditional country and waterways of the Larrakia people.

East Point, Lee Point and Point Charles all appear on Goyder's original plan of Port Darwin in 1869. This point, the easterly extremity of the entrance to Darwin Harbour has been used for a variety of purposes. It was the site of naval and anti-aircraft guns during World War II (1942–1946), a post war golf course and currently a recreation reserve including a pony club and a war museum.

In the 2016 census the suburb of East Point had a population of 14 people.

== See also ==
- Darwin Military museum
