= Woolner, Northern Territory =

Woolner
- Suburb
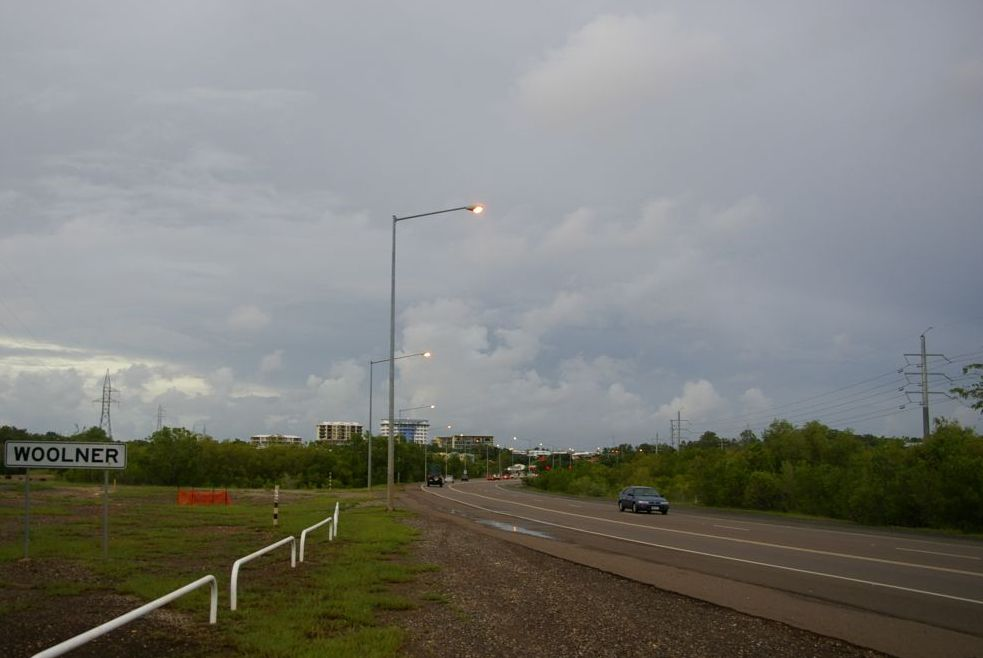

- Interactive map of Woolner
- Country: Australia
- State: Northern Territory
- City: Darwin
- LGA: City of Darwin
- Location: 4 km (2.5 mi) from Darwin

Government
  - Territory electorate: Fong Lim
  - Federal division: Solomon

Population
  - Total: 930 (2016 census)
- Postcode: 0820
Suburbs around Woolner
Fannie Bay	Parap	Narrows
Fannie Bay	Woolner	Bayview
The Gardens	Stuart Park

Woolner is a suburb of Darwin, Northern Territory, Australia. It is the traditional country and waterways of the Larrakia people.

== History ==
Woolner was named after the Woolner (also known as the Djerimanga) Indigenous Australian people who occupied the area east of Darwin when the town was founded in 1869.
