= Wishart, Northern Territory =

Suburb of Darwin, Australia

Wishart
- Suburb
- Interactive map of Wishart
- Coordinates: 12°27′25″S 130°56′05″E
- Country: Australia
- State: Northern Territory
- City: Darwin
- LGA: Northern Territory Rates Act Area
- Location: 10 km (6.2 mi) E of Darwin City
- Established: 21 April 2004

Government
  - Territory electorate: Spillett
  - Federal division: Solomon

Population
  - Total: 0 (2016 census)
- Time zone: UTC+9:30 (ACST)
- Postcode: 0822
- Mean max temp: 32.0 °C (89.6 °F)
- Mean min temp: 23.2 °C (73.8 °F)
- Annual rainfall: 1,725.1 mm (67.92 in)
Suburbs around Wishart
Berrimah	Berrimah	Pinelands
Hidden Valley; East Arm	Wishart	Pinelands; Tivendale
East Arm	East Arm; Tivendale	Tivendale
- Locations; Adjoining suburbs

Wishart is a suburb in the Northern Territory of Australia located in Darwin about 10 kilometres (6.2 mi) east of Darwin City.

Wishart consists of land bounded by the Tiger Brennan Drive in the north, the Berrimah Road in the west and the Adelaide-Darwin Railway in the south. The name is derived from Wishart Road which passes through the south part of the suburb and which is itself named after John Wishart, the contractor who built a wharf in Port Darwin from 1885 to 1886. The suburb's boundary and name were gazetted on 21 April 2004.

The 2016 Australian census which was conducted in August 2016 reports that Wishart had no people living within its boundaries.

Wishart is located within the federal division of Solomon, the territory electoral division of Spillett and the unincorporated area known as the Northern Territory Rates Act Area.

== See also ==
- List of Darwin suburbs
