= East Arm, Northern Territory =

East Arm
- Suburb
- Interactive map of East Arm
- Coordinates: 12°28′39″S 130°54′05″E
- Country: Australia
- State: Northern Territory
- City: Darwin
- LGA: Northern Territory Rates Act Area
- Location: 8 km (5.0 mi) E of Darwin City
- Established: 21 April 2004

Government
  - Territory electorate: Spillett
  - Federal division: Solomon

Population
  - Total: 13 (2016 census)
- Time zone: UTC+9:30 (ACST)
- Postcode: 0822
- Mean max temp: 32.0 °C (89.6 °F)
- Mean min temp: 23.2 °C (73.8 °F)
- Annual rainfall: 1,725.1 mm (67.92 in)
Suburbs around East Arm
Charles Darwin	Charles Darwin; Hidden Valley; Wishart	Wishart; Tivendale
Darwin Harbour	East Arm	Tivendale; Elrundie
Wickham	Wickham	Wickham
- Locations; Adjoining suburbs

East Arm is a suburb in the Northern Territory of Australia located in Darwin about 8 kilometres (5.0 mi) east of Darwin City overlooking a part of Darwin Harbour known as the East Arm. It is the traditional land and waterways of the Larrakia people.

== Geography ==
East Arm consists of land associated with a peninsula extending into the harbour and part of the channels of the following waterbodies that bound the peninsula's coastline: Blesser Creek to the north-west, Frances Bay to the west, the channel known as East Arm to the south and Hudson Creek to the south-east. The name has been used for the locale since the mid-nineteen century. The suburb’s boundary and name were gazetted on 21 April 2004.

== History ==
There are numerous important Larrakia cultural sites at East Arm, as well as World War II heritage sites, including numerous Catalina aircraft wreck sites and the Kelat shipwreck.

It was also the site of a leprosarium. Many healthy offspring of sick Aboriginal adults were taken to Garden Point Mission from the 1930s to the 1960s. Filmmaker Steven McGregor grew up near the leprosarium, and his mother used to work there as a health worker. He and his siblings used to hang out there to use the swimming pool and play. He said there was no real stigma attached to having leprosy, and the people there were fairly happy, and went fishing and did other activities, but missed their family and homes.

== Business ==
Infrastructure and facilities located within the suburb included the following:

- a wharf facility at its south-west end known as the East Arm wharf,
- a public boat ramp, and
- a barge loading area that both access Hudson Creek and the northern terminus for the Adelaide-Darwin railway.

In September 2021, a contract was let by the US Department of Defense for Crowley Solutions, a Florida-based logistics company, to build a fuel storage facility for 300 million litres (79×10^{6} US gal) at a reported contract cost of A$270m (US$195m). 170 million litres (45×10^{6} US gal) will be available for aviation fuel.

== People and Politics ==
The 2016 Australian census which was conducted in August 2016 reports that East Arm had 13 people living within its boundaries.

East Arm is located within the federal division of Solomon, the territory electoral division of Spillett and the unincorporated area known as the Northern Territory Rates Act Area.

== See also ==
- List of Darwin suburbs
