= Charles Darwin, Northern Territory =

Charles Darwin Darwin, Northern Territory
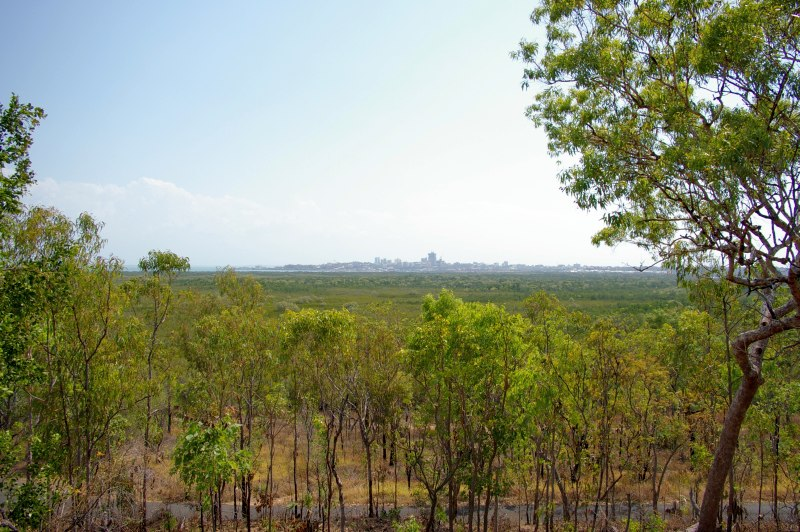
- Looking at Darwin from within the Charles Darwin National Park

- Coordinates: 12°26′7″S 130°52′23″E
- Population: 0 (2016 census)
- Postcode(s): 0820
- LGA(s): City of Darwin; Northern Territory Rates Act Area
- Territory electorate(s): Fong Lim
- Federal division(s): Solomon
Suburbs around Charles Darwin:
Winnellie	Winnellie	Winnellie
Bayview; Darwin City	Charles Darwin	Hidden Valley
Darwin City	Darwin Harbour; East Arm	East Arm
- Footnotes: Adjoining suburbs

Charles Darwin is an eastern suburb in the city of Darwin, in the Northern Territory of Australia. It is the traditional Country and waterways of the Larrakia people.

The suburb is named after Charles Darwin National Park, named after Charles Darwin, which is located within the suburb. The suburb was to be developed as a residential and commercial area but was preserved in April 1997 with the creation of Charles Darwin National Park.
