= Pinelands, Northern Territory =

Pinelands
- Suburb
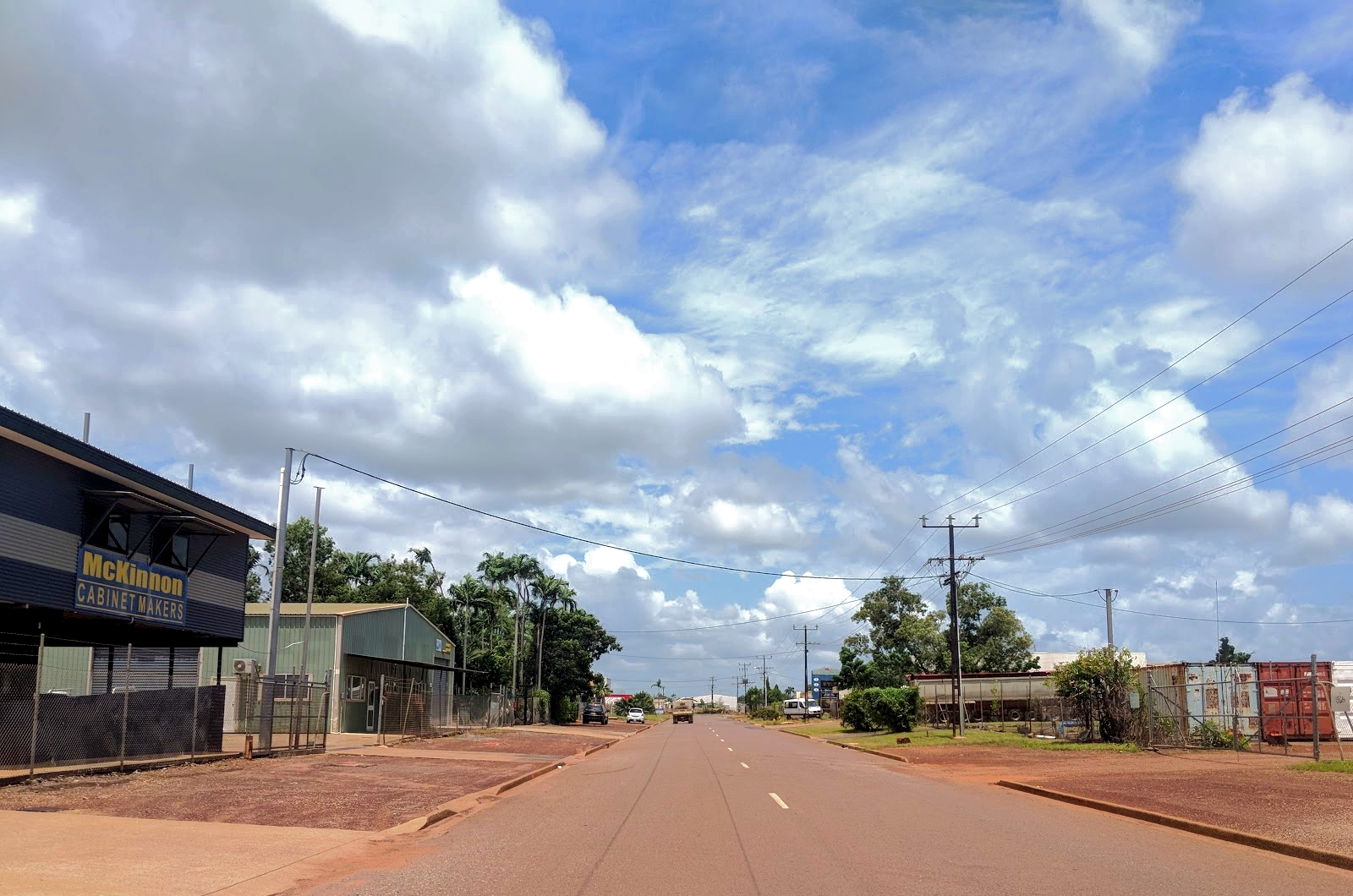
- McKinnon Road, Pinelands

- Interactive map of Pinelands
- Coordinates: 12°27′22″S 130°57′33″E
- Country: Australia
- State: Northern Territory
- City: Palmerston
- LGA: City of Palmerston
- Location: 20.9 km (13.0 mi) from Darwin City; 2.1 km (1.3 mi) from Palmerston
- Established: 5 December 2001

Government
  - Territory electorate: Nelson
  - Federal division: Solomon

Population
  - Total: 25 (2016 census)
- Postcode: 0829
Suburbs around Pinelands
Knuckey Lagoon	Knuckey Lagoon; Holtze	Holtze
Berrimah	Pinelands	Holtze
Wishart	Tivendale; Durack	Yarrawonga

Pinelands is an outer northern suburb of Palmerston, Northern Territory, Australia. It is 21 km southeast of the Darwin CBD and 2.1 km from Palmerston City. Its local government area is the City of Palmerston. It is on the traditional Country and waterways of the Larrakia people.

The area is one of Palmerston's industrial suburbs, along with Yarrawonga.
