= Northern Centre for Contemporary Art =

Art gallery in Darwin, Australia

Coordinates: 12.4317°S 130.8438°E

The Northern Centre for Contemporary Art (NCCA), formerly 24HR Art, NT Centre for Contemporary Art, is an art gallery in Darwin, Northern Territory, Australia.

The gallery was founded in an old petrol station in 1989, giving rise to the name "24HR Art". Artist Suzanne Spunner was a member of the inaugural board and the programming committee, and wrote reviews and programmes for the exhibits as well as creating works for exhibitions there. In 1990, the gallery moved to its present (as of January 2022) location at the Parap Cinema building, in the Parap Shopping Village in Vimy Lane, Parap, an inner-city suburb of Darwin.

The NCCA is the only independent public gallery in the Northern Territory wholly dedicated to contemporary art. It showcases contemporary Aboriginal art as well as non-Aboriginal art and artists, and runs an annual exhibition and public program that helps to support artists and other cultural programs in Darwin.

It is supported by the Australian Government through the Australia Council for the Arts and the Northern Territory Government through Arts NT, under a strategy called the Visual Arts and Crafts Strategy; by donations; and by member subscriptions. As of January 2022 the director of the centre is Petrit Abazi.

NCCA is a member of the advocacy organisation Contemporary Art Organisations Australia.
