= Northern Territory Rates Act Area =

- Local government area
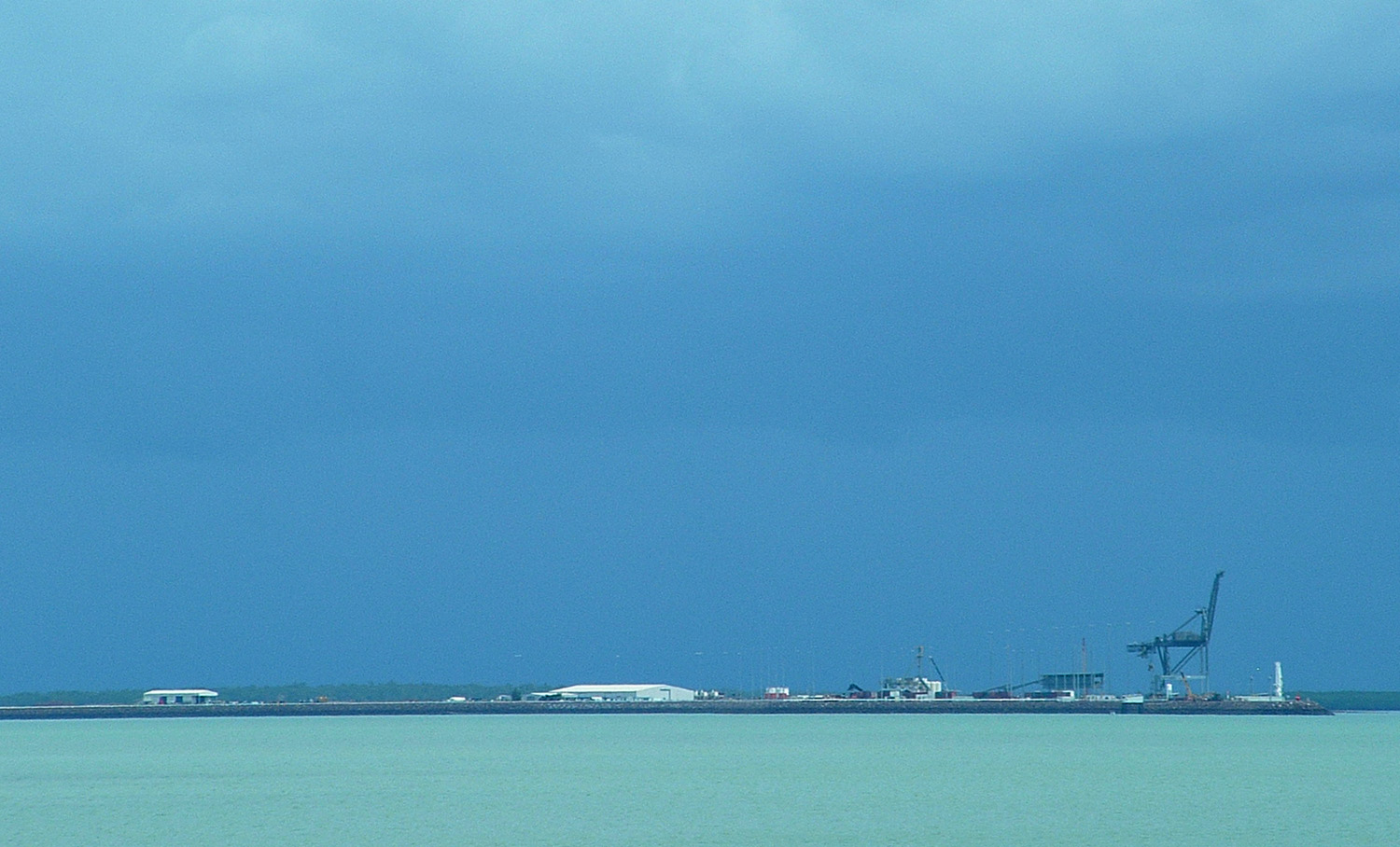
- East Arm Wharf

- Coordinates: 12°28′39″S 130°54′05″E
- Country: Australia
- State: Northern Territory
- City: Darwin
- Established: 1 July 1971

Government
  - Territory electorate: Spillett
  - Federal division: Solomon

Population
  - Total: 13 (2016)
LGAs around Northern Territory Rates Act Area
Darwin	Darwin; Litchfield	Litchfield
Darwin; Unincorporated land	Northern Territory Rates Act Area	Palmerston; Unincorporated land
Litchfield	Litchfield	Litchfield

The Northern Territory Rates Act Area, formerly the Darwin Rates Act Area, is an unincorporated area in the Northern Territory of Australia located in Darwin and where municipal services are provided by the Northern Territory Government.

It is an industrial area where rates revenue goes directly to the Northern Territory Government. It consists the localities of East Arm, Tivendale and Wishart, and parts of the localities of Berrimah, Charles Darwin and Hidden Valley. The only locality in the area with a residential population is East Arm, which had a population of 13 in 2016 (all of whom were male).

In 2014, Alison Anderson, the Minister for Local Government and Regions during a speech in the Northern Territory Parliament in respect to the amendment of the Darwin Rates Act described the unincorporated area as follows:

The prescribed area contains approximately 260 ratepayers and consists of the East Arm logistic precinct (previously referred to as the Trade Development Zone), part of the East Arm Port area and parts of adjacent areas including Berrimah, Tivendale and Wishart.

The Darwin Rates Act was given assent on 19 May 1971 and has been in force since 1 July 1971. In 2014, the act was amended to align with the Local Government Act 2008 and to allow its future application to other unincorporated areas in other parts of the Northern Territory, and was renamed as the Northern Territory Rates Act in order to eliminate confusion with the City of Darwin.
