= Bayview, Northern Territory =

Bayview Darwin, Northern Territory
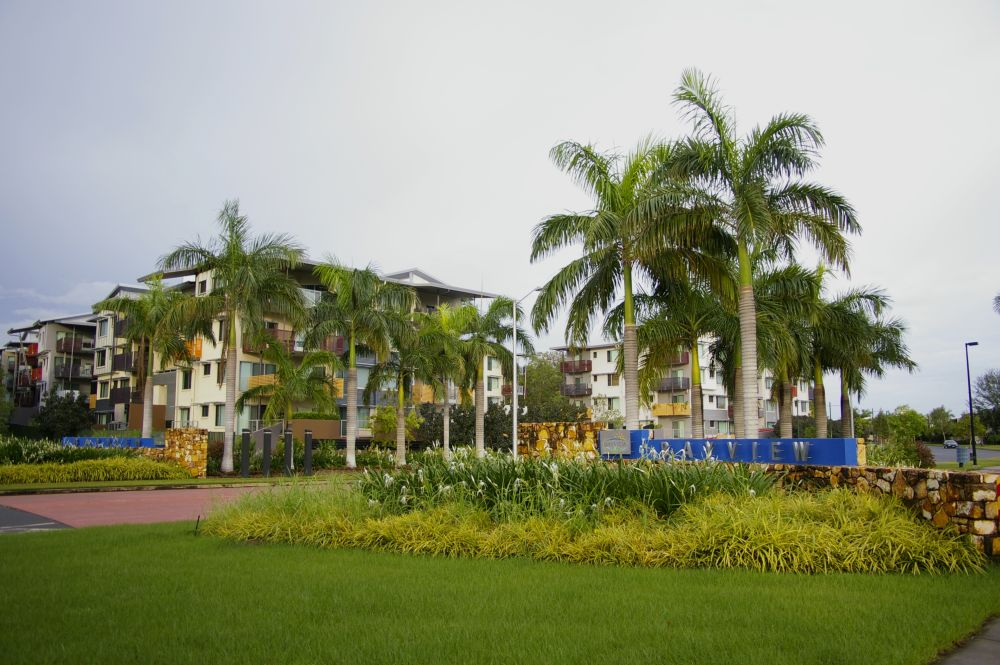

- Coordinates: 12.4403118°S 130.860162°E
- Population: 1,683 (2016 census)
- Postcode(s): 0820
- Location: 4.7 km (3 mi) from Darwin
- LGA(s): City of Darwin
- Territory electorate(s): Fong Lim
- Federal division(s): Solomon
Suburbs around Bayview:
Woolner	Winnellie	Winnellie
Parap	Bayview	Charles Darwin
Stuart Park		Charles Darwin

Bayview is an upper middle class inner city suburb of Darwin, Northern Territory, Australia. It is bounded by Tiger Brennan Drive, the bay area and the Charles Darwin National Park. It is in the local government area of the City of Darwin. It is the traditional country and waterways of the Larrakia people.

== History ==
Bayview is a shortened version of the estate name "Bayview Haven". It is believed to have been named because the area looks over Frances Bay.
