= Parap =

- Suburb
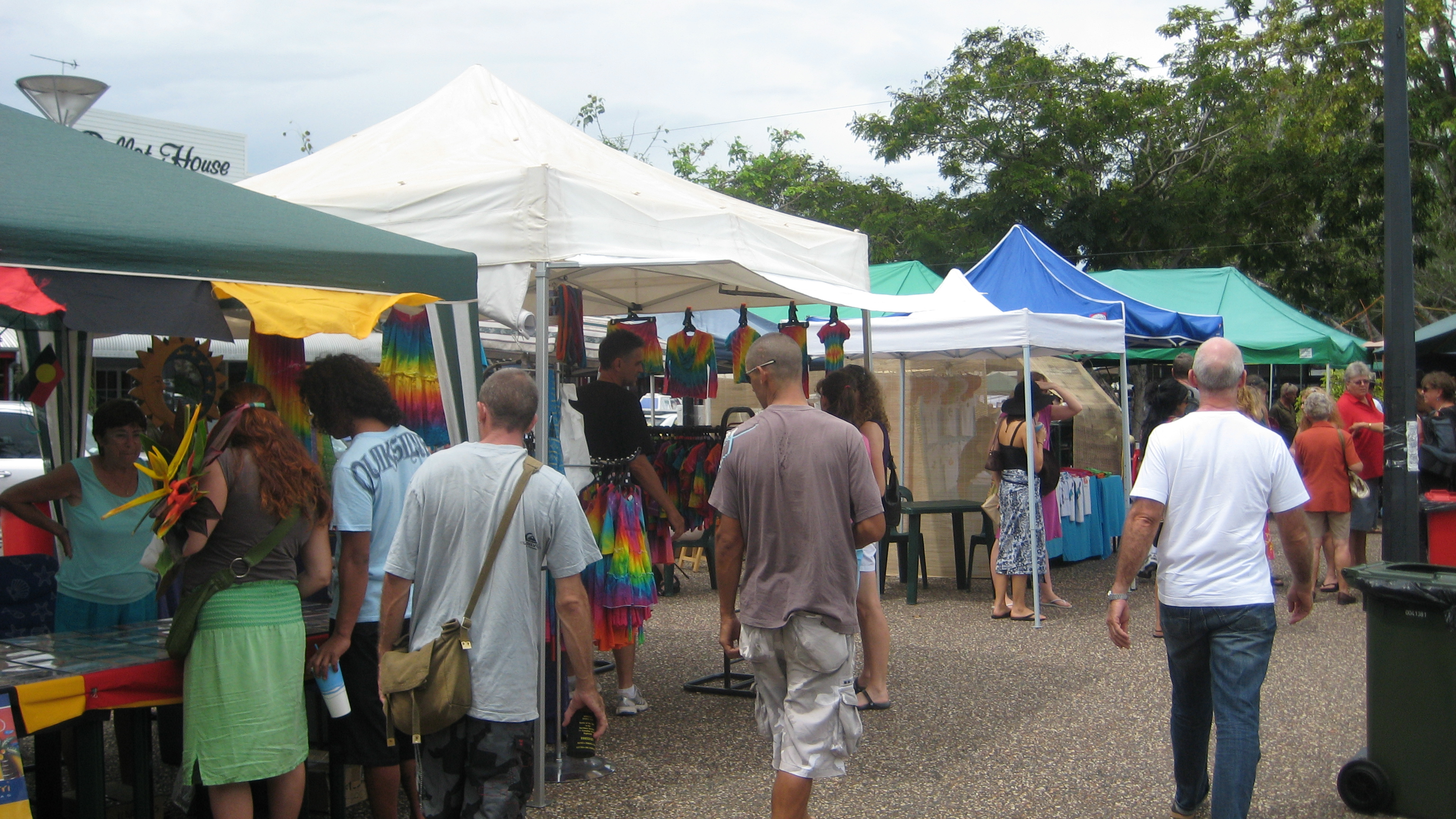
- The Parap markets

- Interactive map of Parap
- Country: Australia
- State: Northern Territory
- City: Darwin
- LGA: City of Darwin
- Location: 3.7 km (2.3 mi) from Darwin
- Established: 1912

Government
  - Territory electorate: Fannie Bay
  - Federal division: Solomon

Area
  - Total: 1.1 km^{2} (0.42 sq mi)

Population
  - Total: 2,747 (2016 census)
  - Density: 2,500/km^{2} (6,470/sq mi)
- Postcode: 0820
Suburbs around Parap
| Fannie Bay | Ludmilla | Ludmilla |
| Fannie Bay | Parap | Bayview |
| The Gardens | Stuart Park | Woolner |

Parap is an inner suburb of the city of Darwin, Northern Territory, Australia. It is the traditional country and waterways of the Larrakia people.

== History ==
Parap derived its name from that applied by Dr John A Gilruth, first Commonwealth Administrator in 1912. He applied the name Paraparap (believed to have been a pastoral property of Dewing near Moriac, Geelong), but had to abbreviate it to Parap later during his term. Parap was also the staging point to the event known as the Darwin Rebellion, on 17 December 1918, in protest against Gilruth's administration.

Parap became well known as the 2½ Mile in subsequent years, being near the Railway Workshop when the train ran in pre-World War II years.

In 1919, when the England to Australia air race was announced, Darwin airport was established in the suburb of Parap to act as the Australian Terminal. Darwin hence operated two airports, a civilian airport and a military field. In 1945, the Department of Aviation made the existing Darwin military airfield available for civil aviation purposes. As a result, the civilian airport at Parap was closed down and airport operations combined with the military airport.

The London-Australia Air Race was actually a means of returning Australian Flying Corps pilots and crews to Australia after the cessation of hostilities – they were required to fly their aircraft home, with a £10,000 prize as the incentive for the first aircraft flown by Australians to reach Australia in less than 30 days before the end of 1919. Having departed Hounslow Heath Aerodrome near London on 12 November, Ross and Keith Smith landed their Vickers FB27 Vimy G-EAOU 40 at Darwin aerodrome at 3.05 pm on Friday 10 December 1919 and were met by the Acting Administrator, Staniforth Smith. They had accomplished the first ever flight from Europe to Australia, a distance of 18,500 kilometres, in 27 days and 20 hours. The following day, the Acting Administrator entertained the heroes at Government House, where they were joined by Lieutenant Hudson Fysh DFC, another veteran of the Light Horse and No.1 Squadron AFC, who had been responsible for clearing the airstrip at Fannie Bay. The aerodrome in Darwin at which they landed was in the suburb of Parap, near the site of the present pool.

Parap is well known for its streets being named after early Australian aviators and explorers including; Ross Smith Avenue, Hudson Fysh Avenue, Leichhardt Crescent and Gregory Street.

== Present day ==
Parap is a predominantly residential suburb and is usually associated with its sister suburb, Fannie Bay and the adjacent inner suburbs of Ludmilla and Stuart Park.

Price Street in Parap was named after Mr Edward W. Price, Magistrate and Commissioner Circuit Court of the Northern Territory from 1873 to 1876 and Government Resident of the Northern Territory from 1876 to 1883. Mr Price lost his wife and six children on the ill-fated SS Gothenburg, which sank off the north Queensland coast, after hitting the Great Barrier Reef on 24 February 1875.

== Attractions ==
The Parap Village Market is one of Darwin's longest running markets, and a local meeting place for breakfast or light lunch. Parap Markets encourage local arts and craftspeople. Situated in the Parap Village Shopping Precinct off Parap Road, the market operates every Saturday of the year, from 8am to 2pm.

Mary’s Laksa, a popular vendor of the Parap Markets, was featured as the 2020 winner of the People’s Choice Award in the Darwin International Laksa festival.

Also in the Parap Shopping Village is the Northern Centre for Contemporary Art, the only independent public gallery in the Northern Territory that is dedicated to contemporary art, Laundry Gallery and Outstation Gallery.

The 1934 Qantas Hangar served as a WWII workshop and now houses steam engines and the first Australian solar car.
