= Winnellie =

- Suburb
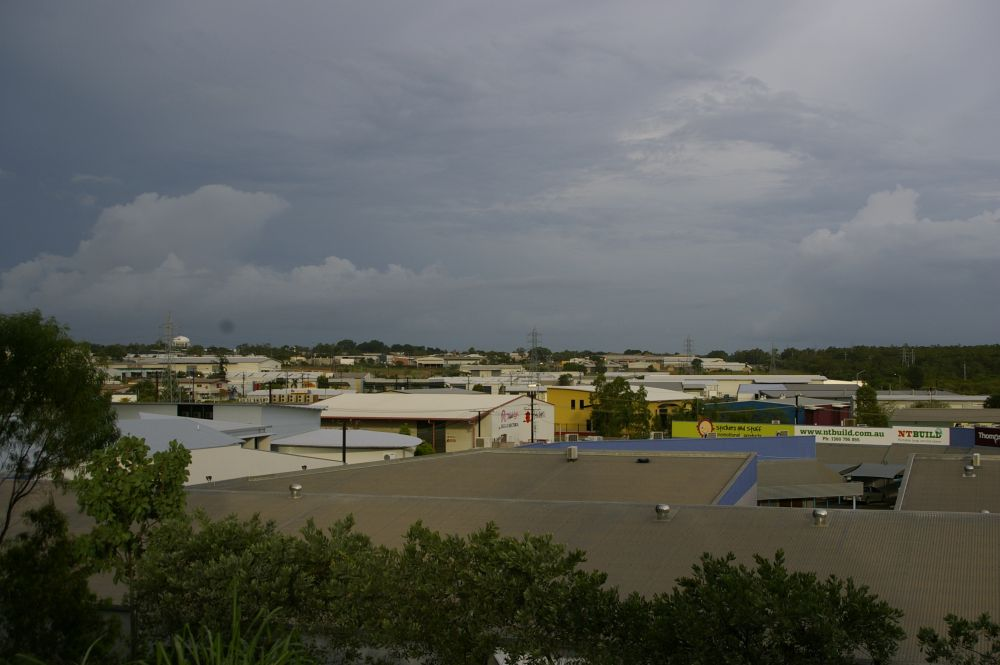

- Coordinates: 12°25′44″S 130°52′11″E
- Country: Australia
- State: Northern Territory
- City: Darwin
- LGA: City of Darwin
- Location: 8.3 km (5.2 mi) from Darwin
- Established: 1941

Government
  - Territory electorate: Fong Lim
  - Federal division: Solomon

Area
  - Total: 5.7 km^{2} (2.2 sq mi)

Population
  - Total: 208 (2016 census)
  - Density: 36.5/km^{2} (94.5/sq mi)
- Postcode: 0820, 0821
Suburbs around Winnellie
The Narrows	Eaton	Eaton
Parap	Winnellie	Berrimah
Bayview	Charles Darwin	Hidden Valley

Winnellie is a northern suburb of Darwin in the Northern Territory of Australia. It is the traditional country and waterways of the Larrakia people.

== History ==
Winnellie is an industrial suburb to the south of Darwin International Airport. The name came from the 'Winnellie Camp' formed there by the Army in 1941. Recently there has been some newer residential areas in the suburb.
