= The Gardens, Northern Territory =

The Gardens
- Suburb
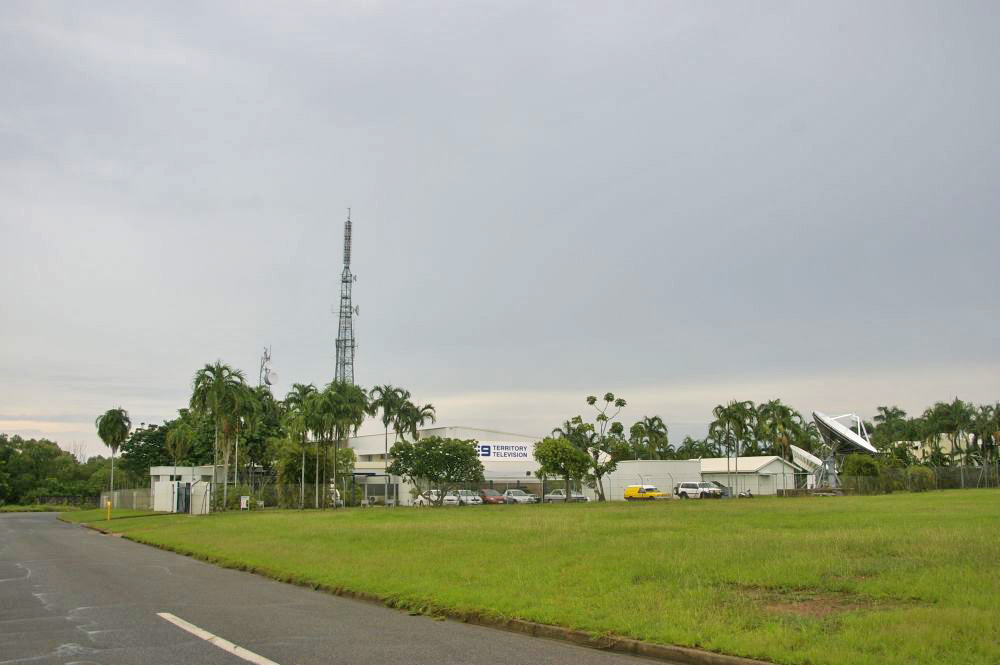
- The Gardens

- Interactive map of The Gardens
- Country: Australia
- State: Northern Territory
- City: Darwin
- LGA: City of Darwin
- Location: 2.2 km (1.4 mi) from Darwin City

Government
  - Territory electorate: Fannie Bay
  - Federal division: Solomon

Area
  - Total: 1.8 km^{2} (0.69 sq mi)

Population
  - Total: 728 (2016 census)
  - Density: 404/km^{2} (1,048/sq mi)
- Postcode: 0820
Suburbs around The Gardens
Darwin Harbour	Fannie Bay; Parap	Parap
Darwin Harbour	The Gardens	Stuart Park
Larrakeyah	Larrakeyah; Darwin City	Darwin City

The Gardens is an inner suburb of the city of Darwin, Northern Territory, Australia. It is the traditional country and waterways of the Larrakia people.

== History ==
The suburb's name derives from the George Brown Darwin Botanic Gardens (named after the former Lord Mayor of Darwin who was formerly the gardens' curator) which began with the appointment of Maurice Holtze in 1878 and has grown to have one of the largest known collections of palms. Holtze used the Gardens area to investigate the possibility of growing sugar cane and cotton in the Territory.

A small residential area adjacent to the Botanical Gardens was called Palmerston Gardens in 1968, but to avoid confusion with the 'new' Palmerston, the Palmerston appellation was discarded in 1984 when the suburb was officially named.
