= Berrimah, Northern Territory =

Berrimah
- Suburb
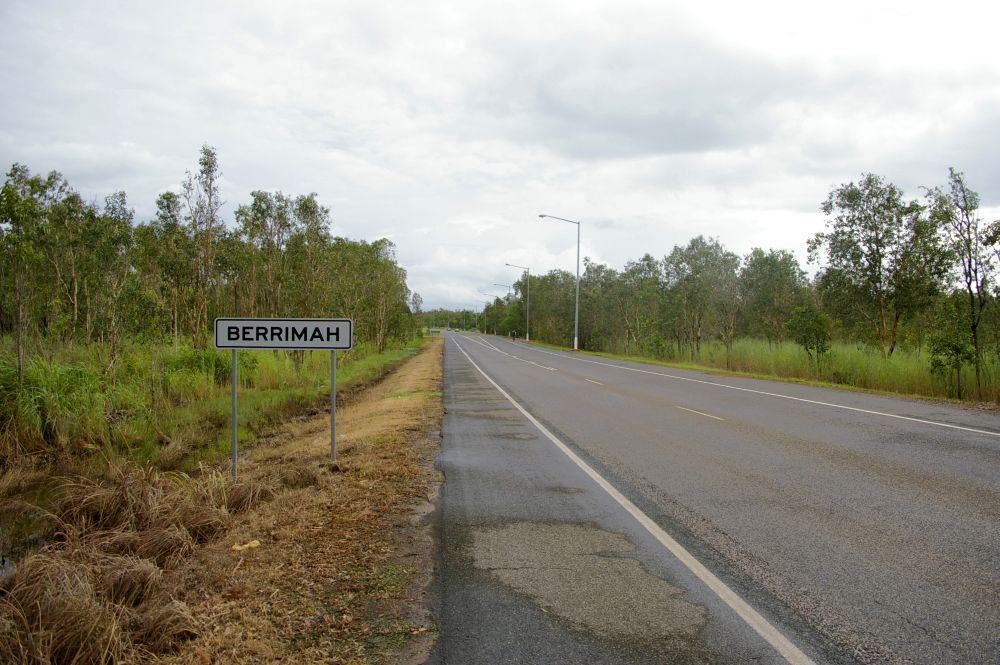
- Amy Johnson Avenue, Berrimah

- Interactive map of Berrimah
- Coordinates: 12°26′2″S 130°55′22″E
- Country: Australia
- State: Northern Territory
- City: Darwin
- LGAs: City of Darwin; Northern Territory Rates Act Area
- Location: 12.4 km (7.7 mi) from Darwin
- Established: 1941

Government
  - Territory electorates: Karama; Fong Lim; Sanderson
  - Federal division: Solomon

Population
  - Total: 789 (2016 census)
- Postcode: 0820
Suburbs around Berrimah
Eaton	Marrara; Karama	Holmes
Eaton; Winnellie; Coonawarra	Berrimah	Knuckey Lagoon; Pinelands
Hidden Valley	Hidden Valley; Wishart	Pinelands; Tivendale

Berrimah is an eastern suburb in the city of Darwin, in the Northern Territory of Australia. It is on the traditional Country and waterways of the Larrakia people.

== History ==
=== World War II hospital and air defence headquarters ===
Before World War II, there was little or no development in the Berrimah area. As the war approached, military authorities had decided on a number of possible locations for strategic "camps" in the Hundred of Bagot region – "Berrimah", "Noonamah" and "Larrimah". The military board chose some local Aboriginal names.

Leading up to the bombing of Darwin and in late 1941, action was being taken to quickly erect the 119th Australian General Hospital at the camp site to be known as "Berrimah". The hospital was built on the present day Kormilda College. The name "Berrimah" is apparently derived from a Mulluk-Mulluk word meaning "place where sick man gets better".

The bombing of the Berrimah hospital by Japanese war planes in 1942 led to its removal to Adelaide River. The hospital buildings were then taken over and expanded by air defence staff to become part of their headquarters.

Not far away on the eastern side of Berrimah Road, a small cemetery reserve holds the graves of 32 Japanese airmen who died during the bombing raids over the Darwin region.

=== Berrimah Aboriginal Compound ===
After the war, in 1947, the old hospital and air defence buildings at Berrimah were sold to the Department of Native Affairs, and it became the Berrimah Aboriginal Compound (also known as the Berrimah Native Settlement).

Local First Nations people, including many who had worked in the Darwin region for the army during the war, were required by law to reside in the compound where their lives were rigorously controlled by the Aboriginal Ordinance Act of 1918.

From 1947 to 1951, the compound became the site of the first labour strikes organised by Aboriginal people in the Northern Territory. Known as the Corroboree Strikes, the inmates refused to work due the poor wages and living conditions at Berrimah. Their leaders, Fred Nadpur Waters, Tommy Playup-Jimmy, Bill Palata and Lawrence Wurrpen were subjected to arrest, incarceration and exile.

After the strikes, the Aboriginal residents were moved from Berrimah to the refurbished compound at the Bagot Aboriginal Reserve.

=== Berrimah Line ===
Berrimah is also the rough location of a concept known as the Berrimah Line; a demarcation term used since the 1960s to describe the inequitable resourcing towards the capital Darwin and surrounding areas, over the vast remote areas of the south.

== Present day ==
Located within Berrimah are the Summer Institute of Linguistics, Kormilda College, Berrimah Power Station, CSIRO Wildlife Research Laboratory, Berrimah Research Farm Centre, Darwin Prison, Don Dale Youth Detention Centre, the Showground and Exhibition Centre.

Berrimah is a predominantly industrial area.

== Population ==
According to the 2016 census of population, there were 789 people in Berrimah.

- Aboriginal and Torres Strait Islander people made up 38.0% of the population.
- 67.3% of people were born in Australia and 48.8% of people only spoke English at home.
- The most common response for religion was Christian at 42.7%.
