= Parliament House, Darwin =

Parliament House of the Northern Territory, Australia

Parliament House
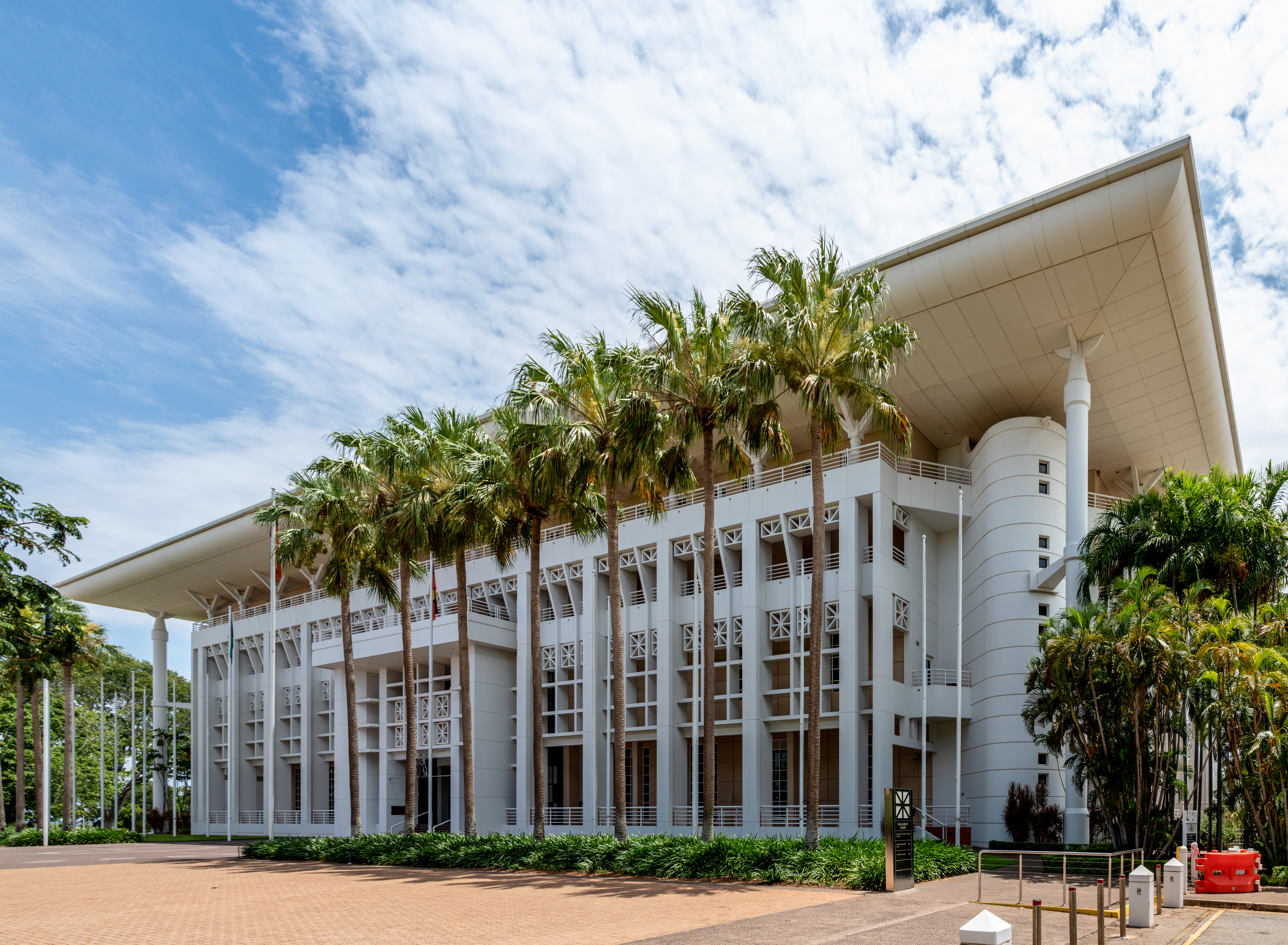
- Parliament House in Darwin

General information
- Architectural style: Postmodern
- Location: Darwin, Northern Territory, Australia
- Coordinates: 12°28′00″S 130°50′34″E
- Construction started: 1990; 36 years ago
- Opened: 4 August 1994; 32 years ago by Bill Hayden, Governor-General of Australia
- Owner: Northern Territory Government

Technical details
- Floor count: 6
- Floor area: 23,000 m^{2} (250,000 sq ft)

Design and construction
- Architects: Designer Tim Rogers B.Architecture B.E Design,Meldrum Burrows) Overall project Peter Doig (Senior Architect, Meldrum Burrows)and Steven Ehrlich (Senior Architect and former Director, MLEA)
- Architecture firm: Meldrum Burrows and Partners Pty Ltd & MLEA
- Structural engineer: SDTM Sleeman, Dunkley Treacy Maunsell

Website
- parliament.nt.gov.au/

Parliament House in Darwin has been the seat of the Northern Territory Legislative Assembly since 1994. Parliament House is located on State Square in the centre of Darwin, which is also the administrative centre of the Northern Territory law and government. It was the second building constructed in the planned "State Square" project, following the new Supreme Court building. Architectural company, Meldrum Burrows and partners Pty Ltd, worked with Darwin Architectural firm MLEA, in the development of the major "State Square" project . Initially, considerable work was undertaken by Principal Richard Meldrum and Principal Roger Linklater (MLEA) in developing the concept with the NT Government. Once the project was commissioned, Senior Architect Peter Doig, took charge of the design and development of the overall "State Square" project, in association Architect Steven Ehrlich. The Supreme Court building, designed by Architect Peter Doig, coming first and the Parliament House, designed by Tim Rogers, B. Architecture, B.E Design. The design was conceived and developed in Darwin, the project constructed from materials largely sourced from the N.T. and employed the building trades and suppliers of the N.T.

Construction of Parliament House began in 1990. The building was completed in 1994, and was officially opened by Bill Hayden, Governor-General of Australia, on 18 August 1994. The Northern Territory Library is also housed in Parliament House.

== History ==
The former Northern Territory Legislative Council established in 1948 was housed in various temporary buildings around Darwin until 1955, when the former site of the Palmerston Post Office, destroyed in the Bombing of Darwin in World War II, was redeveloped to house the Council. The current building stands on the same site. After 1974, the Northern Territory Legislative Assembly continued to operate from the site and adjacent government buildings. In 1988, the NT government announced the planned construction of State Square, which was to house a new Parliament House and Supreme Court. The buildings on the site were demolished in 1990 to allow commencement of the construction of Parliament House. From 1990 to the end of 1994, the Assembly temporarily met in the Chan Building.

== Current building ==
The current building was constructed between 1990 and 1994 as a part of State Square, which also includes the Supreme Court, car parks and landscaping at a total cost at the time of around $170 million. Two workers were killed during construction when a crane collapsed in March 1991 - the memorial fountain in the Speaker's Green is dedicated to their memory.

The building incorporates cyclone resistance features and passive solar building design in its parasol roof and façade, which diffuse about 80% of direct sunlight. The building was designed to serve for 100 years, and to be adaptable and able to accommodate increasing usage.

The colour scheme of the Legislative Assembly Chamber is green with eucalyptus motifs on the walls, commemorating the similar shading of the Australian House of Representatives, itself commemorating the brighter green of the House of Commons of the United Kingdom. The chamber provides for 25 members with room for further members in the future.

In addition to the Legislative Assembly Chamber, the building also houses the Department of the Legislative Assembly, parliamentary offices and Counsel, media facilities, a café, a craft shop, and the Northern Territory Library.

== Awards ==
In 2023 the building was awarded the Northern Territory Enduring Architecture Award by the Northern Territory Chapter of the Australian Institute of Architects. The award recognises longevity and civic contribution of the building to Darwin and the Territory.
