= Hidden Valley, Northern Territory =

Hidden Valley Darwin, Northern Territory
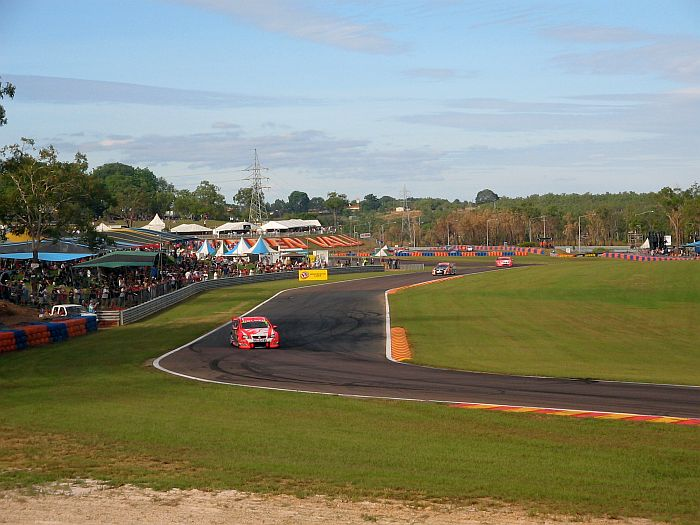
- Hidden Valley Raceway

- Coordinates: 12°26′41″S 130°54′42″E
- Population: 0 (2016 census)
- Established: 21 April 2004
- Postcode(s): 0828
- Location: 8.8 km (5 mi) from Darwin City
- LGA(s): City of Darwin; Northern Territory Rates Act Area
- Territory electorate(s): Fong Lim
- Federal division(s): Solomon
Suburbs around Hidden Valley:
Winnellie	Winnellie; Berrimah	Berrimah
Charles Darwin	Hidden Valley	Berrimah; Wishart; East Arm
East Arm	East Arm	East Arm
- Footnotes: Adjoining suburbs

Hidden Valley is an eastern suburb in the city of Darwin, in the Northern Territory of Australia. It is the traditional country and waterways of the Larrakia people.

== Motorsport ==
A large sports complex exists in the suburb, which includes the Hidden Valley Raceway, the Hidden Valley Dragstrip, Darwin Karting and the Darwin motorcycle riding school, Territory Quad Association, Top End mud racing and Northline Speedway.

Northline Speedway 12°26′45″S 130°54′33″E on the Hidden Valley road hosted important motorcycle speedway events, including the Northern Territory qualifying round of the Speedway World Championship in 1990.
