= Fannie Bay =

- Suburb
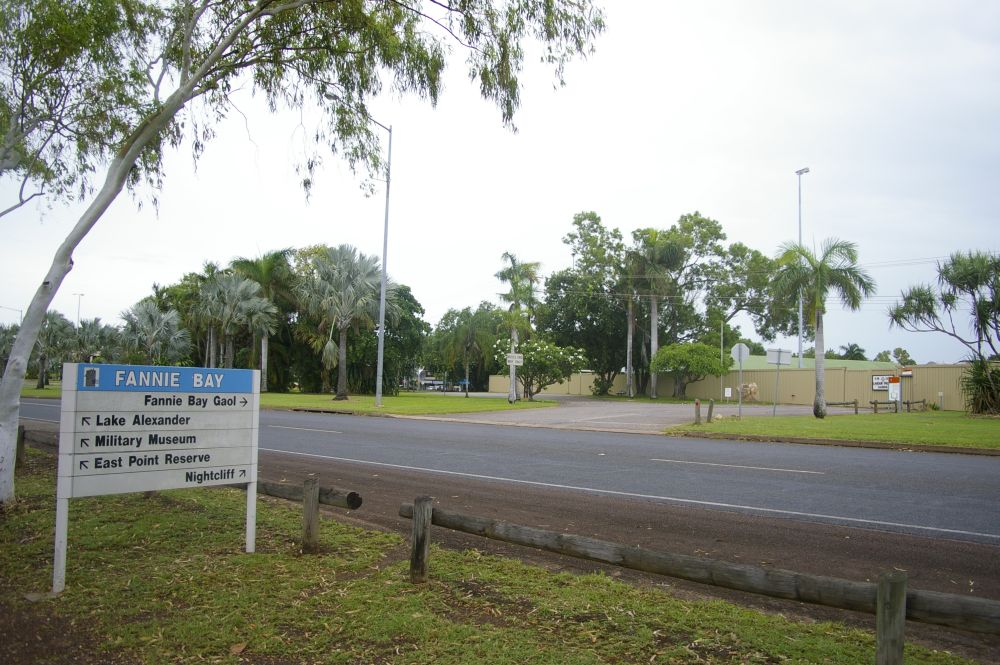
- Fannie Bay, Darwin

- Interactive map of Fannie Bay
- Coordinates: 12°25′37″S 130°50′25″E
- Country: Australia
- State: Northern Territory
- City: Darwin
- LGA: City of Darwin
- Location: 4 km (2.5 mi) from Darwin

Government
  - Territory electorate: Fannie Bay
  - Federal division: Solomon

Area
  - Total: 4.60 km^{2} (1.78 sq mi)

Population
  - Total: 2,624 (2016 census)
  - Density: 570.4/km^{2} (1,477.4/sq mi)
- Postcode: 0820
Suburbs around Fannie Bay
Darwin Harbour	East Point; Ludmilla	Ludmilla
Darwin Harbour	Fannie Bay	Ludmilla; Parap
Darwin Harbour	The Gardens; Parap	Parap

Fannie Bay is a middle/inner suburb of the city of Darwin, Northern Territory, Australia. It is the traditional country and waterways of the Larrakia people.

Situated in the suburb is the Fannie Bay Gaol museum, Fannie Bay Race Track, Fannie Bay Oval the home of the Port Darwin FC and a monument to Ross Smith, captain of the Vickers Vimy, that on 10 December 1919, was the first aircraft to fly from England to Australia in less than 30 days. Adjoining the suburb is the East Point Reserve, containing Lake Alexander, a Military Museum and gun emplacements from the Second World War.

A great many places in the Northern Territory were named by John McDouall Stuart for members of the Chambers family, who sponsored his expeditions. Fannie Bay on the other hand was named by George Goyder after Fanny Carandini, an opera singer.
