= Larrakeyah =

Suburb of Darwin, Australia

Larrakeyah Darwin, Northern Territory
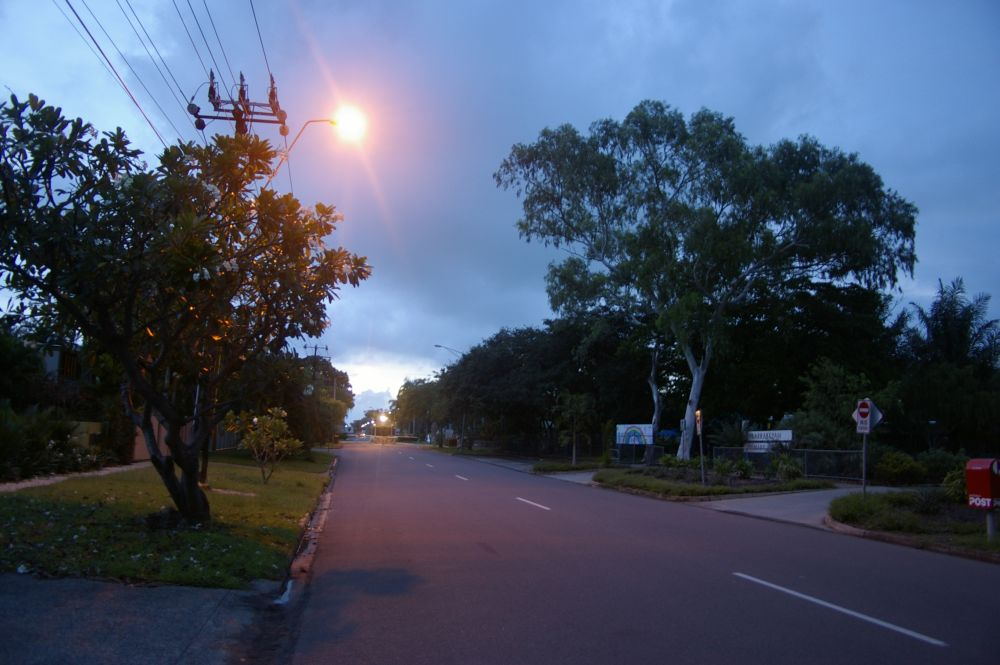

- Coordinates: 12°27′31″S 130°49′18″E
- Population: 3,729 (2016 census)
  - Density: 1,860/km^{2} (4,830/sq mi)
- Postcode(s): 0820
- Area: 2.0 km^{2} (0.8 sq mi)
- Location: 2 km (1 mi) from Darwin
- LGA(s): City of Darwin
- Territory electorate(s): Port Darwin
- Federal division(s): Solomon
Suburbs around Larrakeyah:
Darwin Harbour	Darwin Harbour	The Gardens
Nebraska Beach	Larrakeyah	The Gardens; Darwin City
Darwin Harbour	Darwin Harbour	Darwin City
- Footnotes: Adjoining suburbs

Larrakeyah is an inner suburb of Darwin, the capital city of Australia's Northern Territory. It is the traditional country and waterways of the Larrakia people. It was one of the first parts of the city to be developed, and borders the Darwin Central Business District.

At the 2016 Census, there were 3,729 people in Larrakeyah. 54.9% of people were born in Australia. The next most common countries of birth were England 4.3%, Philippines 4.0% and New Zealand 2.7%. 66.0% of people spoke only English at home. The most common responses for religion were No Religion 31.8% and Catholic 23.5%. The suburb is located within the federal electorate of Solomon and the territory electorate of Port Darwin.

== History ==
Larrakeyah is named after the Larrakia people, who inhabited the area for thousands of years prior to European settlement, and who are the traditional custodians of the land where the city of Darwin was built.

Development of the suburb began shortly after the settlement of Palmerston was established and began to expand with the construction of the Overland Telegraph and discovery of gold at Pine Creek. The colony's first hospital was built on Packard Street, Larrakeyah in 1874, funded privately by English philanthropist Louisa Da Costa who had spent some time in the colony of South Australia, and other members of the community. in Further development occurred when the Myilly Point precinct was established as a residential area for senior public servants in 1911.

In 1913, the Kahlin Compound was established as a segregated camp where Aboriginal families removed from their communities were forced to live in rudimentary structures while receiving a western education, or providing cheap labour for white residents. From 1924, children from the compound were removed from their families to the nearby Myilly Point Half-Caste Home where an inquiry on behalf of the Administrator of the Northern Territory, Frederic Urquhart suggested they could be disciplined and integrated with white society. These events have come to be associated with the Stolen Generations.

On 19 February 1942, bombs fell on the Darwin Hospital and public service residences in Larrakeyah during the Bombing of Darwin. The two air-raids left 250 people dead and another 300 injured. The Hospital itself had been built on the site of the Kahlin Compound and opened just a few days before the attack. It would be significantly expanded following the war and following its closure in the early 1980s, became the first campus of the Northern Territory University.

== Present day ==
The eastern portion of Larrakeyah, towards Emery Point is occupied by Larrakeyah Barracks, a large Australian Defence Force base that incorporates HMAS Coonawarra, headquarters of the Navy's Patrol Boat Group. The rest of the suburb is predominantly residential, with some high-rise development in the Cullen Bay area, on the fringe of the Darwin CBD and overlooking The Gardens. It has a diverse and somewhat transient population. There are a number of serviced apartment developments and accommodation businesses in the suburb, owing to its proximity to the city and tourist attractions including Mindil Beach and the Casino, the George Brown Darwin Botanic Gardens, Doctor's Gully and bars and restaurants at Cullen Bay. The Myilly Point heritage precinct contains a number of public service residences built for high ranking Commonwealth officials during the 1930s. These are rare examples of tropical architecture from the period that relied on natural ventilation for cooling, surviving both the Japanese bombing raids and Cyclone Tracy that devastated many older buildings in the city.

== Facilities ==
The suburb has one school, Larrakeyah Primary School, catering for students in Transition to year 6. There are several public parks in Larrakeyah, including Da Costa Park on Larrakeyah Terrace, a popular place for picnics and walks, offering excellent views of the harbour and city skyline. Other parks include the Kahlin Oval and Myilly Point park. An adventure playground and skate park opened on the old Darwin Hospital site in 2021.

The Sealink ferry terminal is located at the end of Marina Boulevard in Cullen Bay, providing connections to Mandorah and the Tiwi Islands.

== Cullen Bay ==
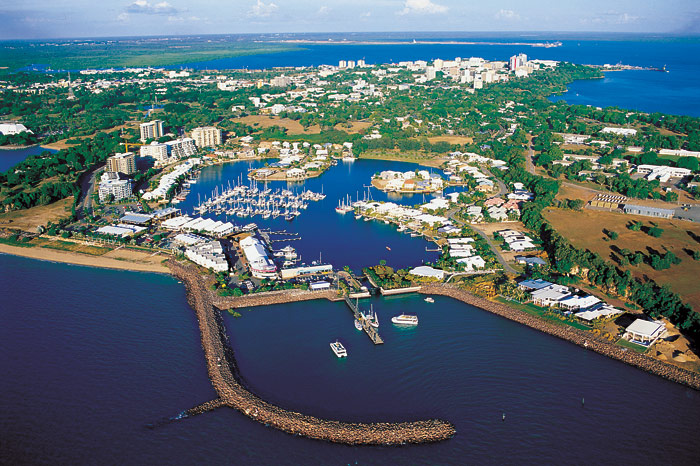
Aerial view of Cullen Bay Marina

Larrakeyah has a man-made housing and marina development called Cullen Bay. It has bars and restaurants. Cullen Bay was built in 1993 on reclaimed land between Emery Point and Myilly Point at the northern end of the suburb. The ferry for Mandorah leaves from the jetty beside the lock.
