= Rugby league in the Northern Territory =

Sports event in Australia

- Governing body: Northern Territory Rugby League
- First played: June 1920, Darwin
- Registered players: 3,674; 6,878+ (including variants)

Club competitions
- Central Australian Rugby Football League, Darwin Rugby League, Gove Rugby League, Katherine Rugby League

Audience records
- Single match: 13,473 (2017 Rugby League World Cup Australia vs Samoa)

Rugby league in the Northern Territory is administered by the Northern Territory Rugby League and is played in Darwin at Warren Park and in Alice Springs at Anzac Oval.

== History ==
Rugby League was the fourth football code introduced to the Territory after soccer (1911), rugby and Australian rules (1916). Rugby fell out of favour in Darwin with the popularity of the NT Football Association (Australian Rules) however Rugby League was organised by the Pine Creek Railway association workers as early as 1920. During the 1920s, League's profile increased and by the 1925, matches were drawing large crowds.

A competition was played in Tennant Creek in 1938.

The first organised competition was played in Darwin in 1941 when 9 teams, mostly made up of servicemen decided to make one unified competition and compete between and against each other. Some of the teams represented the Royal Australian Air Force, the Royal Australian Navy, and the Australian Army. There were also teams made up of citizens in Darwin, along with a team made up entirely of indigenous Australians living in Darwin.

The Central Australian Rugby Football League was formed in 1942 by soldiers based in Alice Springs and competition began in 1943. It was the first football league in Alice Springs, with the now popular Aussie Rules competition not formed for another 5 years.

The competition was cancelled due to the bombing of Darwin and the air raid attacks on the city. Since most of the competition was made from servicemen in Darwin, the competition was severely effected when many of these personal had to go to war and when they were no longer stationed in the Darwin area.

Another competition resumed in 1942 and continued onto 1943 (it was a season which lasted two years) but because of the evacuation of Darwin and then the subsequent shipping out of army and navy personnel from Darwin the competition was completely halted. The Darwin Rugby League Association was formed in 1945, however went into recess shortly thereafter. In 1949, it was revived along with a new competition at Tennant Creek, the Tennant Creek Rugby Football Association was begun. However the competition was short lived and over subsequent decades, teams from Tennant Creek were instead entered into the other leagues.

In 1950, a small group of men, mainly ex-servicemen, joined together to form the Northern Territory Rugby League. The first official season of the reformed Darwin league was started in 1950 with a number of pre-season trial matches and tournaments. The first official match was played on 14 June 1951.

During the 1960s, the Katherine District Rugby League competition began in Katherine town which has been long divided between league and Aussie Rules. However unlike other parts of the Northern Territory, there were no Australian rules football leagues there to compete with until the 1980s as a result the Katherine competition became quite well established and popular with locals.

Cyclone Tracy hit Darwin on 24 December 1974 and completely devastated Darwin. Much damaged was done to its surroundings, but little damage occurred on Richardson Park, the home of rugby league in Darwin. The cyclone had an effect on the competition itself as players and administrators of the clubs and boards of the competition either left Darwin or were involved in the clean-up in Darwin after the cyclone had subsided.

Gove Rugby League began as a development association in 1999 with a single junior club on the Gove Peninsula that remains today.

== Governing body ==
The Northern Territory Rugby League is responsible for administering the game of rugby league in the Northern Territory of Australia. It controls the Darwin Rugby League, Darwin Junior Rugby League and the Centralia Australian Rugby Football League.

Northern Territory is an affiliated state of the overall Australian governing body the Australian Rugby League.

== Participation ==
Registered players
2022	2023/24
3,607	3,674

== Leagues ==
=== Darwin Rugby League (1950–) ===
Club	Suburb	Ground
Darwin Brothers	Anula	Anula Oval
Katherine Wests Tigers	Katherine	Sports & Recreation Club
Litchfield Bears	Litchfield	Freds Pass Reserve
Nightcliff Dragons	Nightcliff	Dripstone High School Oval
Palmerston Raiders	Palmerston	Archer Oval
South Darwin Rabbitohs	South Darwin	Mararra Sporting Complex
Mackillop Sharks	Palmerston	MacKillop Catholic College

=== Central Australian Rugby Football League (1943–) ===
Club	Suburb	Ground
Wests Dragons	Alice Springs	ANZAC Oval
United Magpies	Alice Springs	ANZAC Oval
Alice Springs Brothers	Alice Springs	ANZAC Oval
Central Memo Bulls	Alice Springs	ANZAC Oval

Foundation teams are Wests Dragons and United Magpies.

=== Katherine Rugby League ===
Club	Suburb	Ground
Katherine Bushrangers	Katherine	Sports & Recreation Club
Katherine Raiders	Katherine	Sports & Recreation Club
Katherine Wests Tigers	Katherine	Sports & Recreation Club

=== Gove Rugby League ===
Club	Suburb	Ground
Gove Rugby League	Gove / Nhulunbuy	

== Representative fixtures ==
The Northern Territory team play in the Affiliated States Championship along with the other three affiliated states (South Australia, Victoria, Tasmania and Western Australia) plus the Australian Police and Australian Defence Force. They won the title in 2004.

The Northern Territory competed in the Amco Cup in 1977, 1978 and 1987.

The Northern Territory competed in the 1977 Pacific Cup. The team had little success, winning only one of their four games. The team finished at fourth out of fifth position on the ladder. 1977 was the only time the Northern Territory made an appearance in the Pacific Cup.

== Players ==
- Ben Barba
- Luke Kelly
- Chris Smith
- Liam Knight
- James McManus
- Sam Irwin
- Steve Larder
- Duncan MacGillivray
- Joel Romelo
- Brendan Worth
- Calum Gahan

== See also ==
- NRL Northern Territory
- Northern Territory rugby league team
