= NRL Northern Territory =

Rugby League conducting organization in Northern Territory, Australia

- Founded: 1950
- Formerly named: Northern Territory Rugby Football League Association
- Responsibility: Northern Territory, Australia
- Headquarters: Territory Rugby League Stadium, Marrara, Northern Territory
- Website: https://www.nrlnt.com.au/

(Northern Territory)
- As of 2 December 2009

NRL Northern Territory (abbreviated as NRL NT, formerly the Northern Territory Rugby League) is the organisation responsible for administering the game of rugby league in the Northern Territory. It controls the Darwin Rugby League, Darwin Junior Rugby League and Central Australian Rugby Football League.

Northern Territory is an affiliated state of the overall Australian governing body the Australian Rugby League.

== History ==
Branding of the Northern Territory Rugby League

Former logo

The first rugby league competition in Darwin took place in 1941. This competition was among servicemen stationed in Darwin during World War 2. The competition was suspended following the Japanese air raids on 19 February 1942 and did not recommence until 1943.

The game was not played on an organised basis after servicemen left the city at the end of the war until the formation of the Northern Territory Rugby Football League Association in 1950. The newly formed association's first game was held on 14 January 1951.
Rugby league in the Northern Territory is being played at Richardson Park.

== Competitions ==
=== Darwin Rugby League ===
==== Clubs ====
Colours	Team	Moniker	Est.	Suburb	Ground
	Darwin Brothers	Leprechauns	1958	Darwin	Warren Park
	Litchfield	Bears	1990	Litchfield	Warren Park
	Mackillop	Sharks	1973	Palmerston	Warren Park
	Nightcliff	Dragons	1961	Nightcliff	Warren Park
	Palmerston	Raiders	1961	Palmerston	Warren Park
	South Darwin	Rabbitohs	1976	Marrara	Warren Park

=== Central Australian Rugby Football League ===
Colours	Team	Moniker	Suburb	Ground
	Alice Springs Brothers	Leprechauns	Alice Springs	ANZAC Oval
	Central Memorial	Bulls	Alice Springs	ANZAC Oval
	Wests	Dragons	Gillen	ANZAC Oval

=== Katherine Rugby League ===
The Katherine Rugby League is a rugby League competition in Katherine, Northern Territory.

Colours	Club	Suburb	Ground
	Katherine Bushrangers	Katherine	Sports & Recreation Club
	Katherine Raiders	Katherine	Sports & Recreation Club
	Katherine Wests Tigers	Katherine	Sports & Recreation Club

=== Gove Rugby League ===
The Gove Rugby League is a competition located in Gove, Northern Territory.

Colours	Team	Moniker	Suburb	Ground
	Gove Rugby League	Buffaloes	Nhulunbuy	Hindle Oval

== Notable NTRL juniors who competed in the NRL ==
Alice Springs

- Liam Knight (2016– Manly Sea Eagles, Canberra Raiders & South Sydney Rabbitohs)

Darwin Brothers

- Frank Stokes (1990–94 Manly Sea Eagles)
- Anthony Castro (1990 South Sydney Rabbitohs)

Federal United

- Chris Nahi (1996–98 Gold Coast Chargers)
- Andy Moniz-Wakefield (2024- Melbourne Storm)

Waratahs

- Steve Larder (1985–89 Illawarra Steelers)

Nightcliff Dragons

- Gerry De La Cruz (1982 Canberra Raiders)
- Duncan MacGillivray (1996–2003 South Sydney Rabbitohs & Penrith Panthers)
- Joel Romelo (Melbourne Storm)
- Sam Irwin (Gold Coast Titans)
- Chris Smith (2015– Penrith Panthers & Sydney Roosters)

Nhulunbuy

- Will Chambers (Melbourne Storm)

Katherine Bushrangers

- Luke Kelly (Melbourne Storm)

Palmerston Raiders

- James McManus (Newcastle Knights)

== See also ==
- Rugby league in the Northern Territory
- Darwin Rugby League
