= Darwin Baseball League =

Established in 1953, the Darwin Baseball Association and latterly Darwin Baseball League (DBL) is the governing body of amateur baseball in Darwin, Northern Territory. The DBL is governed by Baseball NT and ultimately, the Australian Baseball Federation.

== History ==
Baseball in Darwin had its beginnings courtesy of Japanese anglers and the American servicemen settled here. Prior to 1953, baseball was a disorganised social get-together. An association was formed and regulated in 1953, thanks to a basketball fan named Charles See-Kee and Wellington Chin, who were both prominent members of the Darwin Chinese community. The game was immediately popular, despite the area's limited population and urban areas.

In sports-conscious Darwin, the original baseballers were already involved with other local sports, mainly Australian rules football and basketball. Darwin baseball originally comprised competitive matches amongst only four teams: DCRC (Darwin Chinese Recreation Club) Red Sox, St. Marys, RAAF Braves and Dodgers. DCRC and St. Marys players were all "settled" residents of Darwin, whereas Dodgers were mostly Government Dept. of Works and Housing employees or bank clerks on two-year postings. RAAF Braves were predominantly defence force personnel.

Games were played on the old Darwin Oval, located on the Esplanade opposite the Hotel Darwin. The playing surface was a levelled out, rock-hard dirt, devoid of any grass, presenting a risk of skin injury to baserunners. It was a time wasn't a properly-shaped baseball field and children chased foul balls that went over the cliff behind the back net and into the sea.

Within two years the competition had grown to 7 teams, remaining through to the mid-1960s. Dodgers disappeared, to be replaced by Waratahs in 1956, which was joined by former Dodger players.

The early 1960s saw a shuffle of playing venues from Kahlin Oval, Waratah Oval, RAAF Base Squadron Oval, Fred Smith Oval, Nightcliff Oval before settling at Gardens Oval in 1965, where the home of baseball would remain for nearly 25 years. Up until then, the competition had always been conducted during the wet season, except in 1956, when a supplementary dry season was conducted at Coonawarra (opposite the Naval Base) to test player support. It was not until the mid-1960s that dry-season baseball was revived, with the league running additional competitions to the regular wet season competition. However, in 1968, with players tired of playing baseball year-round, clubs finally opted for Darwin baseball to remain a wet season sport. It was not until 1984, when the baseball season reverted to dry season competition, which it remains.

In 1989, the clubs opted for a home-and-away competition. Rebels' home ground was a purpose-built diamond at Tracy Village Sports & Social Club. Nightcliff sought and obtained permission from Nightcliff Middle School to build a permanent baseball ground. South Darwin constructed a permanent facility at Warren Park, Marrara Sporting Complex. Palmerston constructed a permanent baseball facility at Archer Field in Palmerston. Pints, unable to secure a permanent facility, played their home games at Tracy Village. Home and away games continued until 2007, when it was decided to play all games at Tracy Village.

Max Rider is a former president and of the DBL, and a Life Member. Rider's volunteer contributions over many years was outstanding and at one stage he held the position of both President and Secretary. Max was instrumental in transforming the DBL into a business-like competition by raising the quality of administration and stakeholder consultation.

== Modern era ==
Of the modern clubs, Waratahs were always strong. They won a Premiership in their first year as Waratahs in 1956 and contested many Grand Finals. However, always a hard team to defeat, ultimate premiership success too often eluded them. In 1968, they went through the season and preliminary finals undefeated, only to lose the Grand Final to Eagles in a whitewash. Their limited finals success earned them the nickname of "Cream Puffs", which remained with them for many years. A major factor in Waratahs being such a strong and popular club in their first 12 years was the success of their recruiting network which was the envy of all other clubs. Waratahs were the only sports club which had its own licensed club house and grounds. Thus, their recruiting tentacles reached out quickly to sign-up the lion's share of talented new arrival in town. As Darwin grew and other clubs also adopted licensed clubs, Waratahs popularity declined and in the early 1980s, they nearly disbanded. Facing survival, they made the hard decision to relocate the club, in 1990, to the satellite city of Palmerston, becoming the Palmerston Reds and in 1996, they won their first Premiership under that name.

Of the other present-day clubs, Pints Green Sox (Post-Tel Institute of the Northern Territory) is the oldest. Formed in 1968, the club gained immediate success in the 1968/69 and 1969/70 seasons. Although Pints have continued to be a competitive club, their limited finals success is arguably not a true indication of their depth.

For the first 12 years of Darwin baseball, DCRC Red Sox dominated the competition. However, in the mid to late 1960s, dwindling player numbers forced the club to disband, in 1969. That year saw the foundation of the Nightcliff Baseball Club, with several former DCRC players adopting the new club. Known as "'The Tigers", Nightcliff dominated the competition throughout the 1970s and early 1980s, playing in 12 consecutive Grand Finals, winning 9 of them. Many critics argued that if Nightcliff had not entered 2 teams in the 1972/73 season, they would have easily won the Grand Final, instead of finishing second and third. Their dominance finally ended when, in 1984, the competition switched from wet-season to dry-season. Nightcliff was the only club to vote against the switch and most players refused to play in protest. As a consequence, Nightcliff did not compete in the inaugural 1984 dry season, but rejoined in 1985. Following a rebuilding program between 1985 and 1989, the Tigers re-established themselves as a competitive force in the competition.

The East Darwin Beasts were formed in 1978, but were previously known as the Oilers and prior to that, the Blue Jays. The Beasts only Grand Final success was in 1980/81, when they finally defeated their long-time nemesis, Nightcliff. East Darwin was the main proponent of swapping the competition from wet-season to dry season, to promote better playing conditions. However, when the change occurred in 1984, it ironically worked against them. The Beasts had large numbers of cricket players who played baseball in the cricket off-season. Thus, when the competition swapped, most of their players choose cricket over baseball. The effect was swift and despite the best efforts of a few stalwarts to keep the club running, they disbanded in 1987.

The South Darwin Rabbitohs was the next club formed in 1970, with the majority of their players recruited from the Northern Territory Police Force. Although success took a long time coming for the Green & Reds, they finally won a flag in 1986 over Waratahs. They repeated the feat the following year and were successful again in 1990. The Rabbitohs were competitive throughout the 1990s. However, as the only club without a sound junior development program, there were limited player numbers being developed through the ranks. Without juniors and with natural attrition of senior players, the Rabbitohs finally succumbed and disbanded in 2004.

The newest of the modern era clubs was Northern Districts Rebels, who were formed in 1975, as a break-away faction of Nightcliff. Several Nightcliff members, disappointed at the way the club was being administered, decided to start a new club. Their early years were difficult, as the club endeavoured to develop a strong junior base for the future. Rebels' first premiership was in the shortened 1983 season, followed again in 1984 and 1985. Without a licensed club behind them, Northern Districts accepted an offer to join the Tracy Village Sports and Social Club. In 1986, they became officially known as Tracy Village Rebels. Rebels have gone on to become the most successful Darwin club, winning 16 premierships.

== Clubs ==
- 1953 St Marys (folded ????)
- 1953 Dodgers (folded 1955)
- 1953 DCRC Red Sox (folded 1969)
- 1953 RAAF Braves (folded 1971)
- 1954 Orphans (folded ????)
- 1955 Postal Pirates (folded 1958)
- 1956 Waratahs → 1990 Palmerston Reds
- 1961 Eagles (folded 1968)
- 1968 Blue Jays → 1970 Oilers → 1978 East Darwin Beasts (folded 1987)
- 1968 Pints Green Sox
- 1969 Nightcliff Tigers
- 1970 South Darwin Rabbitohs (folded 2004)
- 1975 Northern Districts Rebels → 1986 Tracy Village Rebels

== Rivalries ==
There have been two significant rivalries between Darwin baseball clubs.

Between 1969 and 1983, Pints and Nightcliff hated each other with a passion. Both clubs had colourful, passionate and vocal players, not afraid to speak their minds. All-in brawls were a common occurrence during a game resulting in many ejections, reports and suspensions. The rivalry finally began to dissipate in 1984, when Nightcliff disbanded for one year and players from both sides either retired or moved on.

The current rivalry is between Nightcliff and Tracy Village. Commencing in 1990, there has been no love lost between the Tigers and Rebels, and they have squared-off against each other in 13 Grand Finals. During the 1990s and 2000s, there were many heated games as the two best teams in the league battled it out. With Rebels dominating the competition during the 2000s, the rivalry has taken a slightly different perspective, will all other clubs joining the rivalry against Tracy Village. But the rivalry between Rebels and the Tigers remains strong.

The issue was reflected by Clark (2003, p. 134) who stated that traditional rivalries have existed between Australian baseball clubs for many years, with all Darwin clubs squared off traditionally with Nightcliff.

== Premiers ==
Season	Club	Club's progressive total
1953/54	St. Marys	1
1954/55	DCRC Red Sox	1
1955/56	DCRC Red Sox	2
1956	Waratahs	1
1956/57	DCRC Red Sox	3
1957/58	DCRC Red Sox	4
1958/59	DCRC Red Sox	5
1959/60	DCRC Red Sox	6
1960/61	DCRC Red Sox	7
1961/62	DCRC Red Sox	8
1962/63	DCRC Red Sox	9
1963/64	Waratahs	2
1964	Eagles	1
1964/65	Eagles	2
1965/66	Eagles	3
1966/67	Waratahs	3
1967/68	Waratahs	4
1968/69	Pints	1
1969/70	Pints	2
1970/71	Nightcliff Tigers	1
1971/72	Nightcliff Tigers	2
1972/73	Pints	3
1973/74	Nightcliff Tigers	3
1974/75	Season cancelled due to Cyclone Tracy	
1975/76	Nightcliff Tigers	4
1976/77	Nightcliff Tigers	5
1977/78	Nightcliff Tigers	6
1978/79	Nightcliff Tigers	7
1979/80	Nightcliff Tigers	8
1980/81	East Darwin Beasts	1
1981/82	Nightcliff Tigers	9
1982/83	Pints	4
1983	Northern Districts Rebels	1
1984	Northern Districts Rebels	2
1985	Northern Districts Rebels	3
1986	South Darwin Rabbitohs	1
1987	South Darwin Rabbitohs	2
1988	Tracy Village Rebels	4 (includes as Northern Districts)
1989	Pints	5
1990	South Darwin Rabbitohs	3
1991	Nightcliff Tigers	10
1992	Tracy Village Rebels	5
1993	Nightcliff Tigers	11
1994	Tracy Village Rebels	6
1995	Tracy Village Rebels	7
1996	Palmerston Reds	5 (includes as Waratahs)
1997	Tracy Village Rebels	8
1998	Tracy Village Rebels	9
1999	Nightcliff Tigers	12
2000	Tracy Village Rebels	10
2001	Tracy Village Rebels	11
2002	Tracy Village Rebels	12
2003	Tracy Village Rebels	13
2004	Tracy Village Rebels	14
2005	Tracy Village Rebels	15
2006	Tracy Village Rebels	16
2007	Nightcliff Tigers	13
2008	Tracy Village Rebels	17
2009	Tracy Village Rebels	18
2010	Tracy Village Rebels	19
2011	Pints	6
2012	Tracy Village Rebels	20
2013	Tracy Village Rebels	21
2014	Tracy Village Rebels	22
2015	Pints	7
2016	Pints	8
2017	Tracy Village Rebels	23
2018	Tracy Village Rebels	24
2019	Tracy Village Rebels	25
2020	Tracy Village Rebels	26

== Life Members ==
- 1968 - John Chin
- 1978 - Max Rider

== See also ==
- Northern Territory Buffalos
