= Frank Johnson (rugby league) =

Australian RL coach and former Australia international rugby league footballer

Personal information
- Full name: Francis Edwin Johnson
- Born: 4 October 1922; Wollongong, New South Wales, Australia
- Died: 4 March 1993 (aged 70); Manly, New South Wales, Australia

Playing information
- Position: Hooker
Club
Years	Team	Pld	T	G	FG	P
1944–45	St. George	23	1	0	0	3
1947–54	Newtown	118	1	0	0	3
	Total	141	2	0	0	6
Representative
Years	Team	Pld	T	G	FG	P
1947–50	New South Wales	5	0	0	0	0
1948	Australia	0	0	0	0	0

Coaching information
Club
Years	Team	Gms	W	D	L	W%
1952–53	Newtown	0	0	0	0
- Source: The Encyclopedia of Rugby League

Francis Edwin Johnson OAM (1922–1993) was an Australian rugby league footballer, coach and administrator who devoted much of his life to the development of the game in Australia. He was a state and national representative player of the 1940s, and was heavily involved in coaching development in the 1960s and 1970s.

== Playing career ==
Johnson began his senior career as a sixteen-year-old playing for Port Kembla on the New South Wales south coast, He primarily played at hooker and was first selected to represent for NSW Country in 1940. During World War II, Johnson played two excellent seasons with St. George in 1944–1945.

In 1946 he returned to the south-coast and captain-coached Wollongong that year. That year he was selected in a Southern Districts representative side who were victorious over the visiting Great Britain tourists

In 1947, Johnson was back in Sydney, this time with the Newtown Bluebags. He was selected for the New South Wales team and at the end of the 1948 season he toured with the Kangaroos. Johnson injured his leg early in the tour in England and he participated in only seven tour matches.

Johnson was captain-coach of the Bluebags in 1952 and in 1953 was a non-playing coach. His attempt to retire from playing was not entirely successful as he was required to fill in on-field occasionally and in 1954 he was persuaded to return as hooker for the season by his coaching successor, Col Geelan. The team made it to the Grand Final but were beaten by Souths and Johnson finally retired from playing.

== Post-playing career ==
Johnson maintained his connection with the game, firstly as a coach with Wollongong Wests in 1957. He coached them to their first premiership win. In 1962, Johnson was a founding member of the New South Wales Rugby League (NSWRL) Coaching Panel and replaced Keith Gittoes as director of coaching in 1974.

Johnson was responsible for developing coaching and playing skills in Darwin, Northern Territory, and in Papua New Guinea. From 1970 to 1975 he coached the Darwin and Northern Territory teams. It was in his honour that the Frank Johnson Medal, Darwin Rugby League's equivalent of the Rothman's Medal was named. The medal was first awarded in 1973.

Johnson was honoured with life membership of the NSWRL in 1982 and received the Order of Australia Medal for services to the sport of Rugby League Football.

His nephew John Johnson was for a number of years the A Grade coach for the Palmerston Raiders club in Darwin. Frank's great-nephew Matthew Johnson played for the club and made junior Northern Territory representative appearances.

== Sources ==
- Alan Whiticker & Glen Hudson (2007). The Encyclopedia of Rugby League Players. Wetherill Park, New South Wales: Gary Allen Pty Ltd. p. 269. ISBN 978-1-877082-93-1.
