= Baseball NT =

Australian governing body for baseball

Baseball Northern Territory
- Sport: Baseball
- Jurisdiction: Northern Territory
- Founded: 1968; 57 years ago
- Affiliation: World Baseball Softball Confederation
- Regional affiliation: Baseball Confederation of Oceania
- Headquarters: Marrara, Northern Territory

Official website
- baseballnt.com.au
- (Northern Territory)

Baseball NT is the governing body of baseball within the Northern Territory, Australia. Baseball NT was formed in 1968 under its original name, the Northern Territory Baseball League. Baseball NT is governed nationally by the Australian Baseball Federation. Historically, baseball in Australia and the Northern Territory has been an amateur sport.

== Overview ==
Organised baseball is played in Darwin, Alice Springs and Katherine. Darwin has four clubs; Nightcliff Tigers, Palmerston Reds, Pints and Tracy Village Rebels. The East Darwin Beasts disbanded in 1987 and the South Darwin Rabbitohs disbanded in 2004. In Darwin, baseball is a dry-season sport, played between April and September each year. Baseball in Darwin is controlled by the Darwin Baseball Association.

The Katherine Baseball Association has four teams; Dodgers, Cubs, Angels and Braves. The sport is usually played between the months of February through to September, during the dry season. Predominantly, only under seventeen competitions are played due to a lack of interested players. Although a high percentage of participating players are successful in making local squads and Territory/ state teams.

Alice Springs has six teams; Bulls, Cubs, Demons, Panthers, Redbacks and Venom. In Alice Springs, baseball is a summer sport, usually played between October and March. Baseball in Alice Springs is controlled by the Alice Springs Baseball Association.

The Northern Territory competed in the national Claxton Shield competition between 1981 and 1989. During its nine-year admittance, the Northern Territory won only one game, in 1987, against South Australia with a score of 20–11. Bill Hutcheson, a Catcher, from originally Tennant Creek and later Darwin, was the only player to play in all nine Claxton Shields. Evan Gordon was the first Territorian to hit a home run on 16 January 1983, against NSW.

In 1991, the Territory joined the national Australian Provincial Championship (also known as the Commonwealth Cup) competition for regional Australian baseball. Bill Fryar became the first Territorian to hit a home run in 1992, against Queensland. In 1999, the Northern Territory won the Cup for the first time under the leadership of player/coach, Andrew Kendray.

Success for the Northern Territory is difficult as promising juniors are attracted away from the Territory to pursue careers in the southern leagues where their development and opportunities are greater. Several Territorian home-grown players have gone onto successful baseball careers and these most notably include Greg Mosel, Max Hardy, Jon Mellor, Lachlan Burrows, Darren Welch, Wilson Lee, Sam Tibbits, Dushan Ruzic and Adrian Burnside. Rarely do these players return to the Northern Territory. This has created a catch 22 situation for Baseball NT whereby it understands that by developing home-grown talent, there is a good possibility these players will be lost to southern leagues, unlikely to return to the Northern Territory.

In November 1983 however, Territory players were selected to play for Australia against the touring Japanese Industrial League champions, Toshiba, and included, Bill Fryar, Dwayne McInnes, and Laurie Moore from Darwin; John Baldock from Tennant Creek Evan Gordon and Darren Welch from Alice Springs.

Since the late 1990s, the popularity and standard of baseball in the Northern Territory has steadily declined as it struggles to compete against Australian icon sports such as cricket, as well as attract juniors away from the information technology revolution such as computer games and the "hip-hop" culture.

== See also ==
- List of baseball teams in Australia
- Baseball in Australia
- History of baseball in Australia
- Australia national baseball team at the Summer Olympics
- List of baseball teams in Australia
- Australia national baseball team
