= Nightcliff Primary School =

Coordinates: 12°22′50″S 130°51′00″E

- Darwin, Northern Territory; Australia

Information
- Type: Primary school
- Opened: 7 February 1961
- Status: Open
- Enrolment: 570

Nightcliff Primary School is one of the oldest primary schools in Darwin, Northern Territory, Australia. It is situated near the Nightcliff foreshore, where Darwin was defended from Japanese air raids in World War II.

Today the school has a coeducational student population of approximately 500 Primary School students and 70 part-time Preschool students. After leaving Nightcliff Primary School, many students enroll at Nightcliff Middle School.

== History ==
The Nightcliff Primary School site was initially used as an ammunition storage depot during World War II. This was extensively cleared and Nightcliff Primary School was opened on the 7 February 1961 with 240 students and seven classrooms available for use. The staff included the Principal and seven teachers. By 1962, thirteen classrooms were in use. The first uniform consisted of grey shirt and shorts for the boys and a green checked poplin shift dress with a black and white shield embroidered on the pocket for the girls. Initially a black and white peewee was to be embroidered on the pocket but this proved too difficult and costly. By 1974 with an enrolment of 630, extensions were planned for Nightcliff Primary School but Cyclone Tracy thwarted these plans and on Christmas Eve 1974, Cyclone Tracy damaged the school buildings beyond economical repair.

After the devastation of the cyclone, Alawa, Millner, Rapid Creek and Nightcliff Primary Schools combined in the Alawa Primary School buildings in February 1975. Within a few weeks the numbers were too large so students were relocated to Millner Primary School. The resulting combination of schools was named Nimira (Nightcliff, Millner and Rapid Creek) and remained operational for the whole of 1975.

By the beginning of 1976 teachers and students moved back into the habitable buildings and eleven demountable classrooms. It wasn't until 1978 that rebuilding the school began and canteen facilities were not provided until the completion of Stage 2 in 1981.

In 1990, as a result of Economic Review Committee's findings Rapid Creek Primary School was closed and Rapid Creek became part of the feeder area for Nightcliff Primary School. By 1991 numbers rose to 410 and demountable classrooms were added to cope with the increasing need for additional classes.

Major renovations including the addition of an Assembly Area, canteen, toilets, seven classrooms, a dental clinic and an Out of Hours School Care facility began in 1991 and was completed in 1999. In addition, the Library, Staffroom and Office underwent major refurbishment.

Throughout 2006, Nightcliff Primary was involved with the NTSCHOOLS Project and received around 60 new computers through this program.

A former teacher at the school was charged with assaulting a student during the school's Harmony Day celebrations in 2009. It is believed to be the first recorded instance of such an assault in the state.

== School Teams ==
Nightcliff Primary School has four school teams all named after famous explorers who each discovered many different parts of Australia. They are no longer called that we now have them named after the indonise names for the animals on the flag.

One day a year during the dry season, the school holds a sports day in which children participate in competitive sporting activities, mainly in track and field events, with the aim of winning award ribbons and points towards their allocated school team.

The School Teams were great.

== See also ==
- List of schools in the Northern Territory
