= Northern Sharks RLFC =

Australian rugby league club

MacKillop Sharks

Club information
- Full name: MacKillop Sharks Rugby League Club
- Colours: Light Blue; Navy; Black; White
- Founded: 1973

Current details
- Ground(s): MacKillop Catholic College
- Competition: Darwin Rugby League

Records
- Premierships: 3 (2007, 2016, 2017)
- Runners-up: 2 (1997, 2009)

MacKillop Sharks Rugby League Club, formerly known as the University Sharks, was an Australian Rugby League club which competed in the Northern Territory Rugby League competition, based out of MacKillop Catholic College in Palmerston, NT. The Club was originally founded in 1973 as the Northern Suburbs Sharks. It relocated to Palmerston in 2014 in a Partnership with MacKillop. The club was disbanded at the end of 2016, being succeeded by the Northern Sharks and the MacKillop Saints, the latter of which switched codes to Rugby Union in 2018.

== Notable Juniors ==
- Joel Romelo (2009–14; Canterbury Bulldogs, Melbourne Storm & Penrith Panthers)
- Ana Malupo (2025–pres; North Queensland Cowboys)

== See also ==
- Rugby league in the Northern Territory
