= Darwin Rugby League =

The Darwin Rugby League is a former rugby league competition based in Darwin, Northern Territory. The competition is administered by the Northern Territory Rugby League which is the body that takes care of the league's affairs. It administered the competition, officially, from 1950 in Darwin until 2010.

On 6 May 2010, the Australian Rugby League disbanded the Darwin Rugby League due to ongoing issues, including the scheduling of matches and the playing clubs arguing these changes. The competition in Darwin is now controlled by the NTRL.

== Clubs ==
Team	Moniker	Suburb	Ground
Darwin Brothers	Brothers	Darwin CBD	Territory Rugby League Stadium
Northern	Sharks	Palmerston	Territory Rugby League Stadium
Palmerston	Raiders	Palmerston	Raiders Park
Nightcliff	Dragons	Nightcliff	Territory Rugby League Stadium
Litchfield	Bears	Litchfield	Freds Pass
South Darwin	Rabbitohs	Marrara	Warren Park

== Darwin Rugby League Champions ==
This is a list of the Northern Territory Rugby League 1st Grade competition champions and the runners-up for each seasons the competition existed.

Season	Premiers	Score	Runners-up
1990	Darwin Brothers	18 – 12	Tracey Village
1991	Darwin Brothers	28 – 12	Casuarina RLFC
1992	Nightcliff Dragons	28 – 0	Litchfield Bears
1993	Palmerston Raiders	21 – 6	Nightcliff Dragons
1994	Litchfield Bears	16 – 14	Nightcliff Dragons
1995	Litchfield Bears	23 – 6	Nightcliff Dragons
1996	Litchfield Bears	21 – 6	South Darwin Rabbitohs
1997	Litchfield Bears	28 – 14	University Sharks
1998	Litchfield Bears	24 – 18	Nightcliff Dragons
1999	Nightcliff Dragons	24 – 10	Darwin Brothers
2000	Nightcliff Dragons	38 – 6	University Sharks
2001	Nightcliff Dragons	38 – 10	Northern Territory Institute of Sport
2002	Nightcliff Dragons	22 – 10	University Sharks
2003	South Darwin Rabbitohs	51 – 50	Darwin Brothers
2004	Darwin Brothers	62 – 12	University Sharks
2005	Nightcliff Dragons	13 – 12	Darwin Brothers
2006	Nightcliff Dragons	34 – 24	Darwin Brothers
2007	University Sharks	22 – 16	Litchfield Bears
2008	Litchfield Bears	22 – 14	South Darwin Rabbitohs
2009	Darwin Brothers	44 – 10	University Sharks
2010	Darwin Brothers	24 – 14	Nightcliff Dragons
2011	Palmerston Raiders	7 – 6	Nightcliff Dragons
2012	Darwin Brothers	34 – 10	University Sharks
2013	Palmerston Raiders	36 – 22	Darwin Brothers
2014	Darwin Brothers	28 – 16	Nightcliff Dragons
2015	Nightcliff Dragons	26 – 22	Palmerston Raiders
2016	Mackillop Sharks	34 – 16	Palmerston Raiders
2017	Northern Sharks	34 – 22	Darwin Brothers
2018	Litchfield Bears	28 – 4	Nightcliff Dragons
2019	Litchfield Bears	26 – 12	Palmerston Raiders
2020	Darwin Brothers	28 – 26	Litchfield Bears

== See also ==
- NRL Northern Territory
- Northern Territory rugby league team
- Rugby league in the Northern Territory
- Rugby League Competitions in Australia
