= Chris Nahi =

New Zealand Māori rugby league player

Personal information
- Full name: Christopher Hamuera Nahi
- Born: 11 September 1973 (age 53)
- Height: 182 cm (6 ft 0 in)

Playing information
- Position: Prop, Second-row
Club
Years	Team	Pld	T	G	FG	P
1996–98	Gold Coast Chargers	46	6	0	0	24
Representative
Years	Team	Pld	T	G	FG	P
1997	Rest of the World	1	0	0	0	0
1998–02	New Zealand Māori	3	1	0	0	4

Christopher Nahi (born 11 September 1973) is a former professional rugby league footballer. He has played representative rugby league for both the New Zealand Māori team and the Rest of the World side.

== Playing career ==
Nahi played for the Federal United club in the Northern Territory Rugby League competition. In 1994 Nahi toured Queensland and New South Wales with the Northern Territory Representative side.

Between 1996 and 1998 he played for the Gold Coast Chargers team, playing in 46 first grade matches. In 1997 he was cited for biting Darren Senter in a match against Balmain. Nahi alleged he was racially abused by Senter. It was during this time that he was selected in the Rest of the World team to play Australia during the Super League war.

In 2001 he played for the Eastern Suburbs Tigers in the Queensland Cup. In 2002 and 2003 he played for the Burleigh Bears.

In 2008 Nahi played for the Currumbin Eagles in the Bycroft Cup competition on the Gold Coast. After playing in the grand final he tested positive for D-Amphetamine and D-Methamphetamine. As a result, he was banned by the Queensland Rugby League until 1 October 2010.

== Representative career ==
After touring Papua New Guinea with the team in 1998, Nahi was selected to be part of the Aotearoa Māori side that played in the 2000 World Cup. He also played for New Zealand Māori in 2002 against Tonga.

== Controversy ==
Nahi was involved in a police raid which uncovered over 1000 ecstasy tablets in 2005, during the raid Nahi fled and remained on the run for eight days before handing himself into police. He was charged with "deprivation of liberty, the unlawful use of a motor vehicle, obstructing police, firearm and drug related offences". Nahi was sentenced to three-and-a-half years in jail for possessing a commercial quantity of ecstasy tablets in 2006 and convicted of the "deprivation of liberty" charge.

== Redemption ==
During 2016, his final stint in jail Nahi turned to God. The day after leaving prison, he checked into an intensive rehabilitation program in Tweed Heads, New South Wales.

Nahi was deported from Australia in 2017, following which he focused on using his experiences to help others break the chains of addiction.

Nahi opened Victory House Recovery Program on 23 November 2018.
