= Central Australian Rugby Football League =

Australian rugby league football competition

The Central Australian Rugby Football League (CARFL) is a rugby league football competition located in Alice Springs, Northern Territory. It has been in existence since 1963. It is a not-for profit organisation tasked with governing the growth of rugby league football around Alice Springs. It consists of three clubs competing in multiple age groups and all games are played at ANZAC Oval, Alice Springs.

| Team | Moniker | Suburb | Ground |
|---|---|---|---|
| Alice Springs | Brothers | Alice Springs | ANZAC Oval |
| Central Memorial | Bulls | Alice Springs | ANZAC Oval |
| Wests | Dragons | Gillen | ANZAC Oval |

Former clubs:

- Vikings RLFC
- United Magpie

Both United Magpies and Wests Dragons have been members of the CARFL since its foundation in 1963.

== See also ==
- NRL Northern Territory
- Northern Territory rugby league team
- Rugby league in the Northern Territory
- Rugby League Competitions in Australia
