= South Darwin Rabbitohs =

Australian rugby league & union club, based in Marrara, NT

South Darwin Rabbitohs RLFC
- Full name: South Darwin Rabbitohs Rugby League Football Club
- Union: Darwin Baseball League; Darwin Rugby League; Northern Territory Rugby Union
- Nickname(s): Souths, The Bunnies, The Rabbits, The Red and Green
- Founded: 1976; 50 years ago
- Region: Northern Territory
- Ground: Territory Rugby League Stadium

The South Darwin Rabbitohs are a semi-professional Rugby league and Rugby union club based in Marrara, Northern Territory. They play home games at TIO Stadium.

== Rugby ==
South Darwin was one of the founding members of the Northern Territory Rugby Union, in October 1976. They have won seven premierships in the NTRU, most recently in the 2020/21 season.

They also compete in the Darwin Rugby League within the NRL Northern Territory organization.

== Baseball ==
The South Darwin Rabbitohs was the next club formed in 1970 for the Darwin Baseball League, with the majority of their players recruited from the Northern Territory Police Force. Although success took a long time coming for the Green & Reds, they finally won a flag in 1986 over Waratahs. They repeated the feat the following year and were successful again in 1990. The Rabbitohs were competitive throughout the 1990s. However, as the only club without a sound junior development program, there were limited player numbers being developed through the ranks. Without juniors and with natural attrition of senior players, the Rabbitohs finally succumbed and disbanded in 2004.

== See also ==
- List of rugby league clubs in Australia
- List of rugby union clubs in Australia
- Rugby league in the Northern Territory
- List of sports clubs inspired by others
