= Nightcliff Baseball Club =

Amateur baseball club in Darwin, Australia

Nightcliff Baseball Club, Darwin
- Full name: Nightcliff Baseball Club Inc.
- Nickname: The Tigers
- Sport: Baseball
- Founded: 1969
- First season: 1969/70
- League: Darwin Baseball League / Baseball NT
- Home ground: Nightcliff Middle School
- Anthem: "Eye of the Tiger" by Survivor
- President: Mark MacDonald
- Website: nightcliffbaseballclub.com

Strip
- White base with black pinstripe & black/gold trim

Nightcliff Baseball Club Inc. is an amateur baseball club located in Darwin, Northern Territory, Australia. Also known as "the Tigers", the club was formed in 1969 and competes in the Darwin Baseball League (DBL), latterly known as Baseball NT. It is also an affiliated member of the Nightcliff Sports Club.

== Operation ==
Historically, baseball in Australia has been an amateur sport. As such, the club operates or functions under a constitution by a committee of volunteers, elected each calendar year. The club derives its income from player registration fees, sponsorship, grants, donations and fundraising activities. Because the club is an incorporated body, it operates as a legal business entity.

The club is based and trains at Nightcliff Middle School, Aralia Street, Nightcliff.

== History ==
Established in 1969, Nightcliff's origins stemmed from the Darwin Chinese Recreation Club (DCRC) Red Sox. The Red Sox disbanded earlier the same year, but several former players adopted the new club. Bob Melville was elected as the inaugural President, but resigned shortly afterwards following a disagreement with another committee member. He was replaced by Alan Smith, who remained President for the remainder of the season.

Nightcliff dominated the competition throughout the 1970s and early 1980s. This period was known as Nightcliff's 'Golden Era' in which the club played in 12 consecutive Grand Finals, winning 9 of them.

Tiger's Premiers 1971/72. Back Row: Fred Schmidt, Brian Stokes, Fred Bush, Alan Smith, Lyndon Cullen, Mike Buisak. Front Row: John Lewis, Robin Cullen, Gus Arthur, Gary Giumelli, Bobby Bolton, Mal Kinter.

Many critics argued that if Nightcliff had not entered and played two teams during the 1972/73 season, they would have easily won that premiership. The two teams finished second and third. The 1974/75 season was cancelled following Cyclone Tracy and most of the clubs records were either lost or destroyed in the cyclone. However, in late March 1975, an unofficial Grand Final was played between Nightcliff and representatives of the other five clubs. Although Nightcliff won this game, it was not officially recognised by DBL.

Nightcliff Baseball Club was a foundation member of the Nightcliff Sports Club, but the committee held its regular meetings at the Seabreeze Hotel to discuss the affairs of the club. These meetings became well known as "High Masses" and continued until the Seabreeze Hotel was destroyed during Cyclone Tracy in December 1974. Thereafter, the club held its meetings at the Nightcliff Sports Club.

In the mid- to late 1980s, the club suffered both competitively and financially, arguably from the competition swapping, in 1984, from wet-season to dry-season. Nightcliff did not compete in the inaugural 1984 dry-season competition due to lack of players, but rejoined in 1985. In 1988, the club faced financial crisis and considered bankruptcy as the DBL threatened expulsion from the league. However, a lifelong Nightcliff supporter, Kay Thrupp, provided a financial lifeline and two major fund-raising efforts secured the club's financial position.

Between 1985 and 1989 the club entered a 'Rebuilding Era' with an emphasis on junior player development. Ultimately, the strategy proved too successful with several home-grown players subsequently pursuing baseball careers in southern states, where their opportunities were greater. Since 1990, the club has remained competitive. The period between 1990 and 2000 was known as the 'Kendray Era' in reference to Nightcliff's star player who dominated the competition, coached and led the club. During the 1990s, Nightcliff played in seven Grand Finals, winning a further three premierships.

In 1989, the club built a permanent baseball field at Nightcliff High School. In 1997, the club became an incorporated body, to reflect the changing way amateur sport was being administered in Australia.

Between 2000 and 2006, Nightcliff played in six of the possible seven Grand Finals, but failed to win any. This period was known as Nightcliff's 'Bridesmaid Era'. This era officially ended in 2007, when Nightcliff won the Grand Final against their long-time rivals, Tracy Village, 11–4.

In 2010, Nightcliff created a first in Northern Territory baseball history when the club appointed a woman, Narelle Gosstray, as their senior club coach. Gosstray, a former Australian women's baseball representative and Aussie Hearts coach, was also the first woman appointed to coach an Australian junior baseball side. She was among the recipients of the 2010-11 Australian Sports Commission's Sport Leadership Grants and Scholarships for Women to further her development as a high performance baseball coach. In her first year as coach, the Tigers made the 2010 grand final after finishing with the wooden spoon the previous year. In the final, however, Nightcliff lost to their long-time rivals, Tracy Village 6–2.

In 2015 Nightcliff signed another woman player, 27-year-old left-hand pitcher Amy Collins, who won a bronze medal with the Australian women's team at the 2014 World Cup in Japan, where the opposition included baseball giants the US, Canada, Venezuela, Japan and Chinese Taipei. In her first game with the Tigers, Collins pitched a 26–5 winning game over the Palmerston Reds.

== Premiers ==
13 - 1970/71, 1971/72, 1973/74, 1975/76, 1976/77, 1977/78, 1978/79, 1979/80, 1981/82, 1991, 1993, 1999 and 2007.

=== Runners up ===
17 - 1969/70, 1972/73, 1980/81, 1990, 1994, 1997, 1998, 2000, 2001, 2002, 2003, 2004, 2006, 2010, 2012, 2013 and 2018.

== Life Members ==
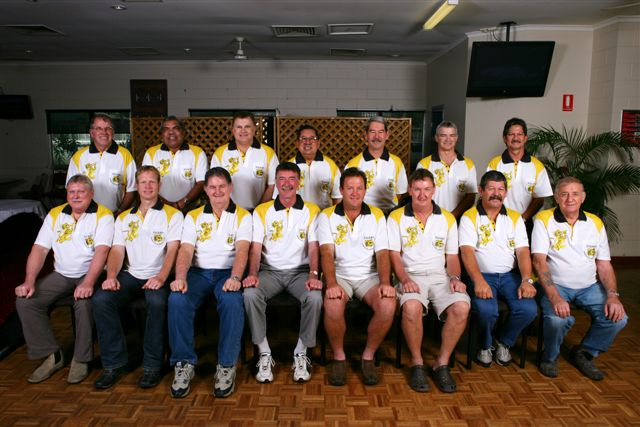
Life Members at the club's 40th reunion in October 2009. Standing from left: Gary Giumelli, Fred Bush, Bill Fryar, Steve Cubillo, Graeme Halprin, Gary Hodgson, Paul Rider. Sitting from left: Mal Kinter, Brett Edwards, Neil McCormack, Kieran Cassidy, Andrew Kendray, Marc Green, Leigh Halprin, Bob Kendray.

The constitution allows for Life Membership and is awarded on the basis of outstanding volunteer service to the club. At least 10 years of predominantly non-playing service is generally considered necessary to achieve Life Membership. Current Life Members with their year of induction follow:

- 1974 - Gus Arthur
- 1977 - Steve Cubillo
- 1978 - Fred Schmidt †
- 1978 - Fred Bush †
- 1979 - Gary Giumelli
- 1981 - Malcolm Kinter
- 1982 - Neil McCormack
- 1986 - Graeme Halprin
- 1988 - Kieran Cassidy
- 1988 - Leigh Halprin
- 1993 - Bill Fryar †
- 1997 - Andrew Kendray
- 2001 - Gary Hodgson
- 2002 - Paul Rider
- 2006 - Brett Edwards
- 2007 - Marc Green
- 2008 - Bob & Brenda † Kendray
- 2009 - Brett Hagan
- 2019 - Kathy Green
- 2019 - Ashley Kendray
- 2019 - Mark Macdonald

† Deceased

== Honour Board ==
Season	MVP	Batting avg.	RBIs	Gold Glove	Stolen bases
1969/70	Fred Bush	Fred Schmidt	Peter Goodchild	Fred Schmidt	Fred Bush
1970/71	John Lewis	Fred Bush	Peter Goodchild	Robin Cullen	Robin Cullen
1971/72	Gary Giumelli	Gary Giumelli	Gary Giumelli	Mike Buisak	Robin Cullen
1972/73	Gary Giumelli	Gary Giumelli	Fred Bush	Fred Schmidt	Gary Giumelli
1973/74	Grant Baker	Fred Schmidt	Gary Giumelli	Fred Schmidt	Gary Giumelli
1974/75	No award	No award	No award	No award	No award
1975/76	Wayne Longstaff	Gary Giumelli	Gary Giumelli	Fred Schmidt	Gary Giumelli
1976/77	Wayne Longstaff	Wayne Longstaff	Neil McCormack	Fred Schmidt	Gary Giumelli
1977/78	Leigh Halprin	Leigh Halprin	Gary Giumelli	Mal Kinter	Gary Giumelli
1978/79	Wayne Longstaff	Wayne Longstaff	Kieran Cassidy	Mal Kinter	Gary Giumelli
1979/80	Nick Bear	Nick Bear	Fred Bush	Nick Bear	Paul Rider
1980/81	Lance Schmidt	Bill Fryar	Gary Giumelli	Bill Fryar	Bill Fryar
1981/82	Lance Schmidt	Kieran Cassidy	Fred Bush	Leigh Halprin	Kieran Cassidy
1982/83	Bill Fryar	Bill Fryar	Garry Haigh	Bill Fryar	Bill Fryar
1983	Kieran Cassidy	Garry Haigh	Kieran Cassidy	Bill Fryar	Bill Fryar
1984	No award	No award	No award	No award	No award
1985	Lance Schmidt	Lance Schmidt	Leigh Halprin	No award	No award
1986	Lance Schmidt	Leigh Halprin	Shane Higgins	No award	No award
1987	Andrew Kendray	Andrew Kendray	Andrew Kendray	Bill Fryar	Bill Fryar
1988	Greg Cran	Andrew Kendray	Andrew Kendray	Bill Fryar	Bill Fryar
1989	Andrew Kendray	Neil Curnow	Andrew Kendray	Bill Fryar	Bill Fryar
1990	Andrew Kendray	Andrew Kendray	Scott Lawson	Bill Fryar	Darren Kimmorley
1991	Peter Cole	Peter Jackson	Andrew Kendray	Peter Jackson	Bill Fryar
1992	Andrew Kendray	Andrew Kendray	Peter Cole	Bill Fryar	Bill Fryar
1993	Andrew Kendray	Andrew Kendray	Andrew Kendray	Bill Fryar	Scott Farrer
1994	Ashley Kendray	Andrew Kendray	Mark Van Pelt	Andrew Kendray	Tom Keily
1995	Andrew Kendray	Darren Kimmorley	Andrew Kendray	Adam Keily	Bill Fryar
1996	Greg Cran	Darren Kimmorley	Andrew Kendray	Erv Moyd	Sean Ferme
1997	Andrew Kendray	Andrew Kendray	Greg Cran	Sam Tibbits	Brett Beaton
1998	Adam Keily	Andrew Kendray	Andrew Kendray	Jason Duncan	Adam Keily
1999	Darrin Wilson	Andrew Kendray	Andrew Kendray	Warwick Southwood	Jason Duncan
2000	Brett Niddrie	Andrew Kendray	Andrew Kendray	Jason Duncan	Jason Duncan
2001	Brett Niddrie	Brett Beaton	Brett Beaton	Kieran Bush	Brett Beaton
2002	Chris Davies	Tim Wells	Warwick Southwood	Warwick Southwood	Chris Davies
2003	Brett Beaton	Brett Beaton	Brett Beaton	Jamie Wakelam	Joel Harvey
2004	Lachlan Burrows	Lachlan Burrows	Ashley Kendray	Brett Beaton	Lachlan Burrows
2005	Brett Niddrie	Brett Edwards	Anthony Zamalo	Ashley Kendray	Drew Hodgson
2006	Brett Beaton	Brett Beaton	Brett Beaton	Drew Hodgson	Drew Hodgson
2007	Brett Niddrie	Ashley Kendray	Brett Beaton	Brett Beaton	Anthony Zamolo
2008	Joel Harvey	Joel Harvey	Brett Beaton	Brett Beaton	Brett Niddrie
2009	Narelle Gosstray	Joel Harvey	Brett Beaton	Adrian Handford	Bernard Kelly
2010	Daniel Conway-Jones	Daniel Conway-Jones	Daniel Conway-Jones	Adrian Handford	Daniel Conway-Jones
2011	Jason Ellery	Joel Harvey	Sean Mumme	Adrian Handford	Levi Blanchette
2012	Daniel Conway-Jones	Kieran Bush	Kieran Bush	Rich Williamson	Jason Ellery
2013	Jason Ellery	Jason Ellery	Jason Ellery	Matt Vickers	Joel Harvey
2014	Mitchell Green	Jason Ellery	Jason Ellery	Matt Vickers	Joel Harvey
2015	Joel Harvey	Jason Ellery	Jason Ellery	Amy Collins	Mitch Green
2016	Joel Harvey	Adrian Handford	Jason Ellery	Michael Lee	Anthony Zamolo
2017	Mitchell Green	Jason Ellery	Jason Ellery	Blake Hettiger	Jason Ellery
2018	Mitchell Green	Jack Green	Blake Hettiger	Drew Hodgson	Kieran Bush

== Memorable moments ==
=== 1960s ===
- 23 November 1969 - Nightcliff defeat Blue Jays 53–1, a Darwin Baseball League record that still remains to this day. Fred Schmidt, Fred Bush and Peter Goodchild all star for the Tigers.

=== 1970s ===
- 17 January 1971 - With scores tied at 6 all after 9 innings, Pints score 1 run in the top of the 13th. With one out in the bottom half of the inning, Fred Schmidt singles and Peter Goodchild ends the game with a walk-off home run and 8–7 win against Pints. Fred Bush pitches all 13 innings for the win.
- 17 March 1974 - In the 1973/74 Grand Final against Waratahs, Gary Guimelli walks and scores before another pitch is thrown. Nightcliff win the Grand Final 14–2.
- 13 March 1977 - In the 1976/77 Grand Final against Oilers, Wayne Longstaff hits the leadoff hitter with the first pitch of the game. He then retires the next 26 hitters in a row, before allowing a bloop single with 2 out in the 9th. Nightcliff win the Grand Final 6–0.
- 15 October 1978 - Wayne Longstaff throws 18 strikeouts in a 7 innings (mercy rule) game against South Darwin to tie the league record of 18 strikeouts in a 9 innings game.
- 29 October 1978 - Wayne Longstaff throws an 18 strikeout, no-hit, shutout, in a 7 innings (mercy rule) game against Northern Districts, to tie his own league record.
- 3 December 1978 - Gary Giumelli steals 7 bases in one game from 1 hit and 4 walks, to set a new DBL record and Wayne Longstaff throws 15 strikeouts, to help defeat South Darwin 9–1.

=== 1980s ===
- 9 March 1980 - With 1 out in the top of the 9th inning, Kieran Cassidy hits a 2-run home run to tie the game at 3 all. Nightcliff go on to score 5 runs in the top of the 11th inning and win the 1979/80 Grand Final against East Darwin, 8–3.
- 14 March 1981 - Behind all game and down 5–3 with 2 out in the bottom of the 9th inning, Bill Fryar and Fred Bush both double to win the Preliminary Final 6–5 against Pints and qualify for their 11th consecutive Grand Final appearance.
- 6 October 1983 - Lance Schmidt throws 17 strikeouts and 17 walks in a 5-hour rain soaked 'night ball' Grand Final against Rebels. Nightcliff eventually lose 19–17. Nightcliff players Gary Giumelli, Paul Rider & Gary Lambert are all ejected from the game.
- 16 August 1987 - In the upset of the season, cellar-dwellers Nightcliff defeat league leaders and eventual Premiers, South Darwin, 4–1. Lance Schmidt throws a complete game for the Tigers while Andrew Kendray hits a 2-run home run and Bill Fryar hits 2 sacrifice flies.

=== 1990s ===
- 9 September 1990 - Nightcliff finish the regular season as minor premiers, ending a 6-year drought of not appearing in the finals.
- 29 September 1991 - Already down 1 game in the best of 3 Grand Final series and behind early in the second game, Andrew Kendray hits a three-run home run to tie the score at 4 all. Nightcliff never look back and go to win the game 6–5.
- 6 October 1991 - Playing with a broken right hand (after being hit by a pitch the week before), Peter Jackson goes 3 for 4 with 4 RBIs to help win game 3 and the Grand Final against Tracy Village, 8–5.
- 18 September 1993 - Behind all game and down 7–2 in the top of the 8th inning, Nightcliff turn a triple-play to end the innings. In the bottom of the 9th inning, Nightcliff rally with 4 runs to win game 1 of the Grand Final series, 8–7. They go on to win the 1993 Premiership the next day against Tracy Village, who until now, had only lost one game throughout the season.
- 8 May 1994 - Playing in his 300th 'A' grade game, Bill Fryar goes 5 for 5 with 4 RBIs, 3 stolen bases and 2 runs scored, to help seal a 6–4 win against Pints.
- 29 May 1994 - With the scores tied at 8 all after 9 innings, Bill Fryar tripled to lead-off the bottom of the 14th inning, and scored on a walk-off base hit by Hamish Cameron defeating Pints 9–8, ending the longest game in DBL history. Peter Cole throws all 14 innings for the win.
- 18 May 1995 - With 2 out in the last innings of a night game at Richardson Park, Andrew Kendray ends the game with a walk-off Grand Slam and a 5–3 win against Tracy Village.
- 19 September 1999 - Needing to win the final game of the regular season against Pints to finish minor premiers, scores are tied at 4 all after 4 innings until with 1 out in the bottom of the 10th when Andrew Kendray doubles and scores on a single by Brett Edwards to end the game 5–4.

=== 2000s ===
- 13 August 2000 - With scores tied at 3 all after 9 innings, Brett Beaton doubles with 1 out in the bottom of the 11th and advances to third on a sacrifice fly to right field. Warwick Southwood picks up the game-winning RBI with an infield hit and 4–3 win against Palmerston.
- 17 September 2000 - Needing to win the last game of the regular season to make the finals, Nightcliff thump league leaders Palmerston, 26–1. Pitcher Brett Niddrie throws a 2-hitter for the Tigers.
- 10 September 2006 - In the Elimination Final against Palmerston, the Reds have a 6–5 lead late in the game. In the bottom of the 7th inning, Nightcliff send 16 hitters to the plate and score 10 runs (all earned) against 3 Palmerston pitchers. The Tigers win the game 15–7 and advance to the 2006 Grand Final.
- 20 May 2007 - In one of the tightest games of Nightcliff's history, the Tigers defeat Palmerston 1–0 after they score in the 6th inning following safe hits by Tim Rolland and Danny Dong. Pitcher Brett Niddrie throws a 2-hitter for the Tigers.
- 16 September 2007 - Tiger pitcher Brett Niddrie scatters 7 hits, in a stellar 128-pitch complete game. He also doubles in the game-winning RBI in the 8th inning, to win the Preliminary Final against the Palmerston Reds 4–3, as Nightcliff advance to their 10 Grand Final appearance in 11 years.
- 23 September 2007 - Nightcliff score 6 runs in the top of the 9th inning to break the game open and go on to win the 2007 Grand Final against Tracy Village, 11–4.
- 19 December 2009 - Former Australian women's baseball representative, Narelle Gosstray, wins the Tigers "Most Vavuable Player" award, becoming the first woman to achieve that feat.

=== 2010s ===
- 25 July 2010 - Nightcliff pitcher Daniel Conway-Jones throws 14 strikeouts in a 7 innings game and also picks up 3 safe hits in a great individual performance, but the Tigers lose the game 3–1 to Tracy Village.
- 6 April 2014 - Nightcliff score 13 runs in the 4th innings in a 22–2 win over Palmerston, with Joel Harvey and Mitch Green leading the offence.
- 15 June 2014 - In a hard-fought game, Nightcliff eventually outslug Pints in a 23–21 victory with Jason Ellery, Joel Harvey and Mitch Green leading the Tigers offence.
- 17 April 2015 - Australian women's player, left-hand pitcher Amy Collins, pitches a 26–5 winning game against the Palmerston Reds.
- 24 May 2015 - Nightcliff race to a 10–2 lead, but are pegged back by the Palmerston Reds who tied the game at 11–11 at the end of the ninth inning. The Tigers scored a run at the top of the 11th and held the Reds hitters to earn the win.

== Representatives ==
=== Claxton Shield ===
Between 1981 and 1988, the Northern Territory competed in the national Claxton Shield competition and the following Nightcliff players represented the NT.

- 1981 - Bill Fryar, Lance Schmidt, Leigh Halprin & Wayne Longstaff
- 1982 - Bill Fryar & Dennis Kerin
- 1983 - Bill Fryar, Lance Schmidt & Paul Rider
- 1984 - Bill Fryar
- 1985 - Lance Schmidt
- 1986 - Nil
- 1987 - Bill Fryar
- 1988 - Andrew Kendray & Scott McCormack

=== Australia ===
Several Nightcliff registered players have represented Australia and they appear below.

- 1983 - Bill Fryar (Australian Invitation team to play 3-game series against Japanese industrial league champions, Toshiba)
- 1987 - Andrew Kendray (Under 18 National team to tour the United States)
- 1997 - Andrew Kendray (Australian Provincial team tour of Europe)
- 1999 - Andrew Kendray (Australian Provincial team tour of Europe)
- 2001 - Andrew Kendray & Greg Cran (Australian Provincial team tour of Europe)
- 2003 - Sam Tibbits (Australian Senior Team)
- 2003 - Ashley Kendray (Australian Provincial team tour of Europe)
- 2005 - Ashley Kendray (Australian Provincial team tour of Europe)
- 2007 - Ashley Kendray (Australian Provincial team tour of Europe)
- 2009 - Ashley Kendray (Australian Provincial team tour of Japan)
- 2014 - Narelle Gosstray (Assistant Coach - Australian Women's National Team - World Cup - Japan - Bronze)
- 2016 - Amy Collins (Australian Emeralds team, that competed at the Women's Baseball World Cup).

== Retired numbers ==
The constitution allows for a player's uniform number to be retired, if that player has played 15 or more seasons at 'A' grade level with the club. Players with their corresponding retired numbers and principle position follow:

Nightcliff Tigers retired numbers
No.	Player	Position	Career	Ref
13	Fred Bush	3rd base	1969–83	
11	Kieran Cassidy	1st base	1972–88	
14	Leigh Halprin	Utility	1973–89	
21	Bill Fryar	1st base / Center field	1980–99	
12	Andrew Kendray	Catcher	1985–01	

== See also ==
- List of baseball teams in Australia
- Baseball in Australia
- History of baseball in Australia
- Northern Territory Buffalos
