= Litchfield Bears =

Club information
- Full name: Litchfield Bears Rugby League Club
- Colours: Red; Black
- Founded: 1990

Current details
- Ground(s): Webber Park, Coolalinga
- CEO: Nathan Finn
- Competition: Darwin Rugby League

Records
- Premierships: 6 (1994, 1995, 1996, 1997, 1998, 2008, 2018, 2019)

Litchfield Bears Rugby League Club is an Australian rugby league football club based in Litchfield, Northern Territory formed in 1990. They conduct teams for both Juniors & Seniors teams.

== See also ==
- Rugby league in the Northern Territory
