= Chris Smith (rugby league, born 1994) =

Australian rugby league footballer

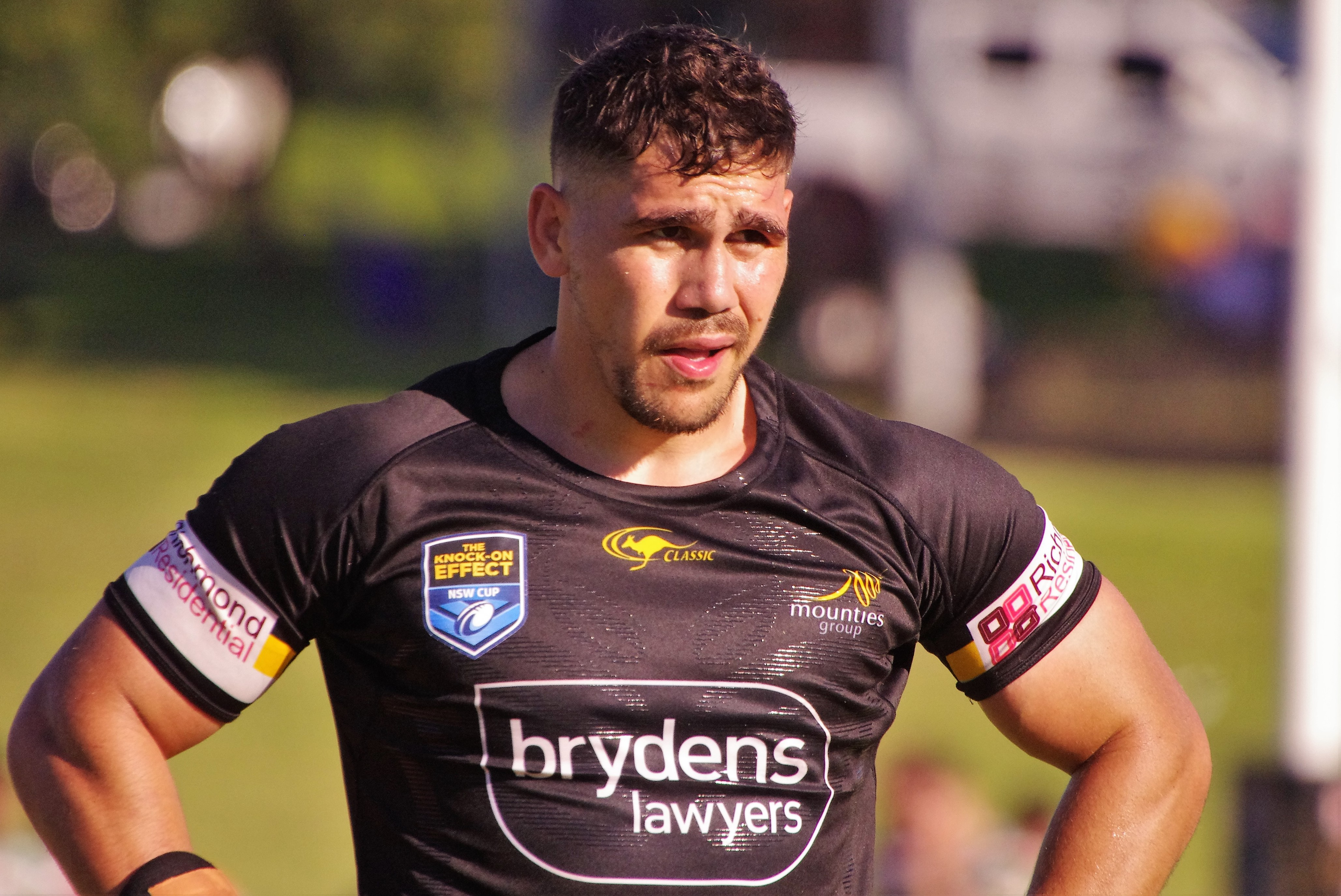

Personal information
- Full name: Christopher Smith
- Born: 16 January 1994 (age 31); Darwin, Northern Territory, Australia
- Height: 185 cm (6 ft 1 in)
- Weight: 104 kg (16 st 5 lb)

Playing information
- Position: Second-row, Lock
Club
Years	Team	Pld	T	G	FG	P
2015	Penrith Panthers	1	0	0	0	0
2016–17	Sydney Roosters	2	0	0	0	0
2018–21	Canterbury Bulldogs	30	2	0	0	8
2022–23	Penrith Panthers	6	1	0	0	4
	Total	39	3	0	0	12
Representative
Years	Team	Pld	T	G	FG	P
2017–	Indigenous All Stars	4	0	0	0	0
- Source: As of 3 June 2022

Chris Smith (born 16 January 1994) is an Australian professional rugby league footballer who last played as a second-row forward and lock for the Penrith Panthers in the NRL.

He previously played for the Sydney Roosters and the Canterbury-Bankstown Bulldogs in the National Rugby League, and the Indigenous All Stars at representative level.

== Background ==
Smith was born in Darwin, Northern Territory, Australia.

He played his junior rugby league for the Nightcliff Dragons in the Darwin Rugby League and attended Casuarina High School, before being signed to a contract by the North Queensland Cowboys at age 15. At 17 years of age, he signed with the Penrith Panthers, moving to Sydney and attending Patrician Brothers' College, Blacktown.

== Playing career ==
=== Early career ===
From 2012 to 2014, Smith played for the Penrith Panthers' NYC team. In August 2012, he played for the Australian Schoolboys.

=== 2015 ===
In 2015, Smith graduated to the Penrith New South Wales Cup team.

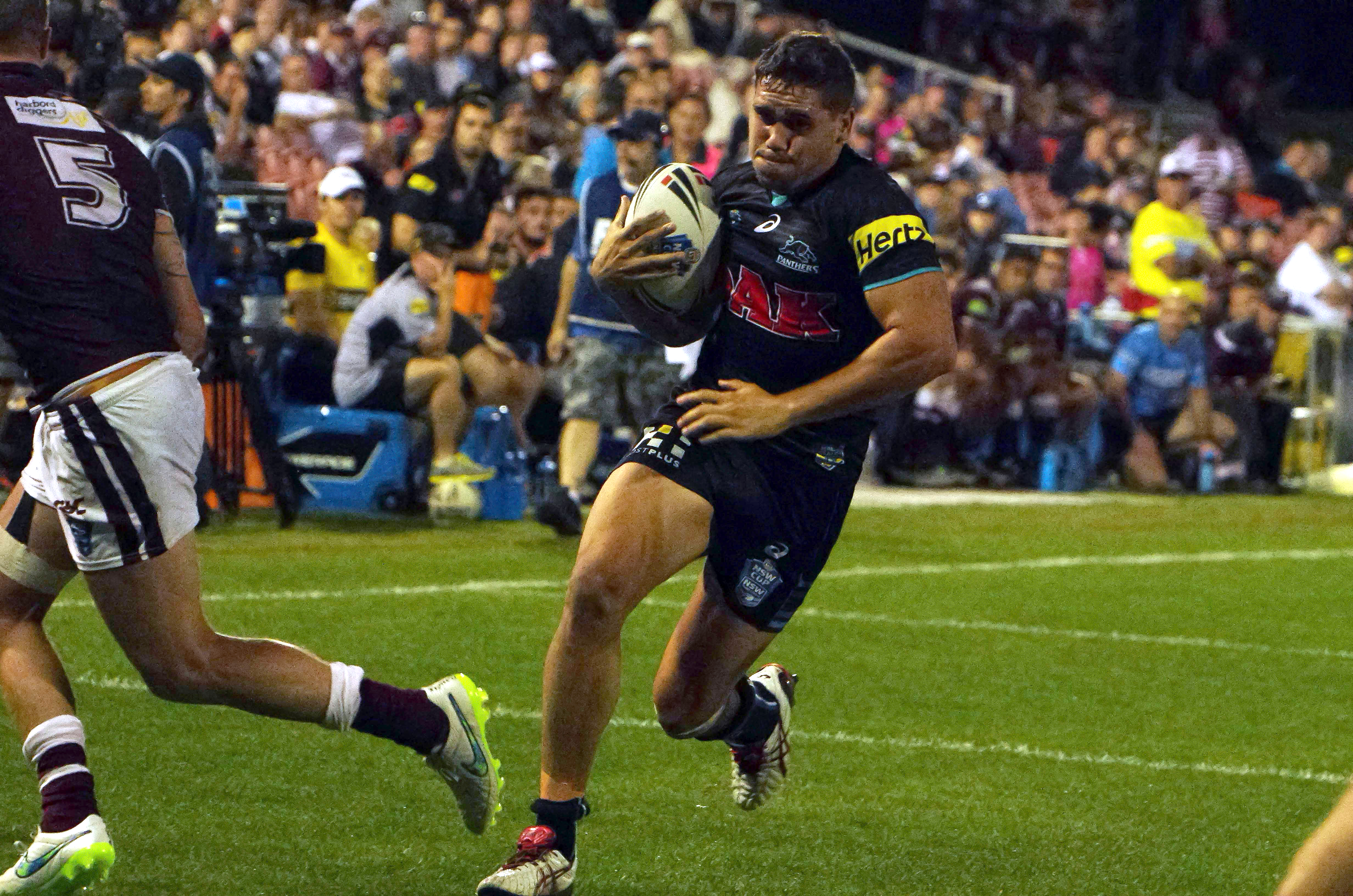
Smith playing for the Panthers in 2015

In Round 26 of the 2015 NRL season, he made his NRL debut for Penrith against the Newcastle Knights.

=== 2016 ===
On 6 April, Smith was released from his Penrith contract to join the Sydney Roosters effective immediately, on a contract to the end of 2017.

=== 2017 ===
Smith made only one first grade appearance for the Sydney Roosters in the 2017 NRL season which came against Canberra in round 12 and ended in a 16-24 loss.

=== 2018 ===
At the end of 2017, Smith signed a contract with Canterbury-Bankstown. Smith made only one appearance for Canterbury in the 2018 NRL season which came against Brisbane in round 21 and ended in a 36-22 victory at ANZ Stadium. Smith spent most of the year playing with Canterbury's reserve grade team. Smith played in the club's Intrust Super Premiership NSW grand final victory over Newtown at Leichhardt Oval. The following week, Smith played in Canterbury's NRL State Championship side which defeated Redcliffe 42-18 at ANZ Stadium.

=== 2019 ===
Smith made a total of 20 appearances for Canterbury in the 2019 NRL season as the club finished 12th on the table. Smith only missed 5 matches all season and cemented himself in the first grade squad. On 22 November 2019, Smith signed a two-year contract extension to stay at Canterbury until the end of the 2021 season.

=== 2020 ===
In February, Smith was ruled out for the first three months of the 2020 NRL season after suffering a torn MCL and a partial ACL tear during the pre-season Indigenous All Stars game.

=== 2021 ===
On 31 August, Smith was one of twelve players who were told by Canterbury that they would not be offered a contract for the 2022 season and would be released at seasons end. In November, Smith signed a contract to return to the Penrith Panthers for the 2022 season.

=== 2022 ===
Smith played six games for Penrith in the 2022 NRL season. Smith played most of the year with the clubs NSW Cup team. On 25 September, Smith played for Penrith in the clubs NSW Cup Grand Final victory over Canterbury. On 2 October, Smith played in Penrith's 44-10 victory over Norths Devils in the NRL State Championship final.
