= Sam Irwin =

Australian rugby league footballer

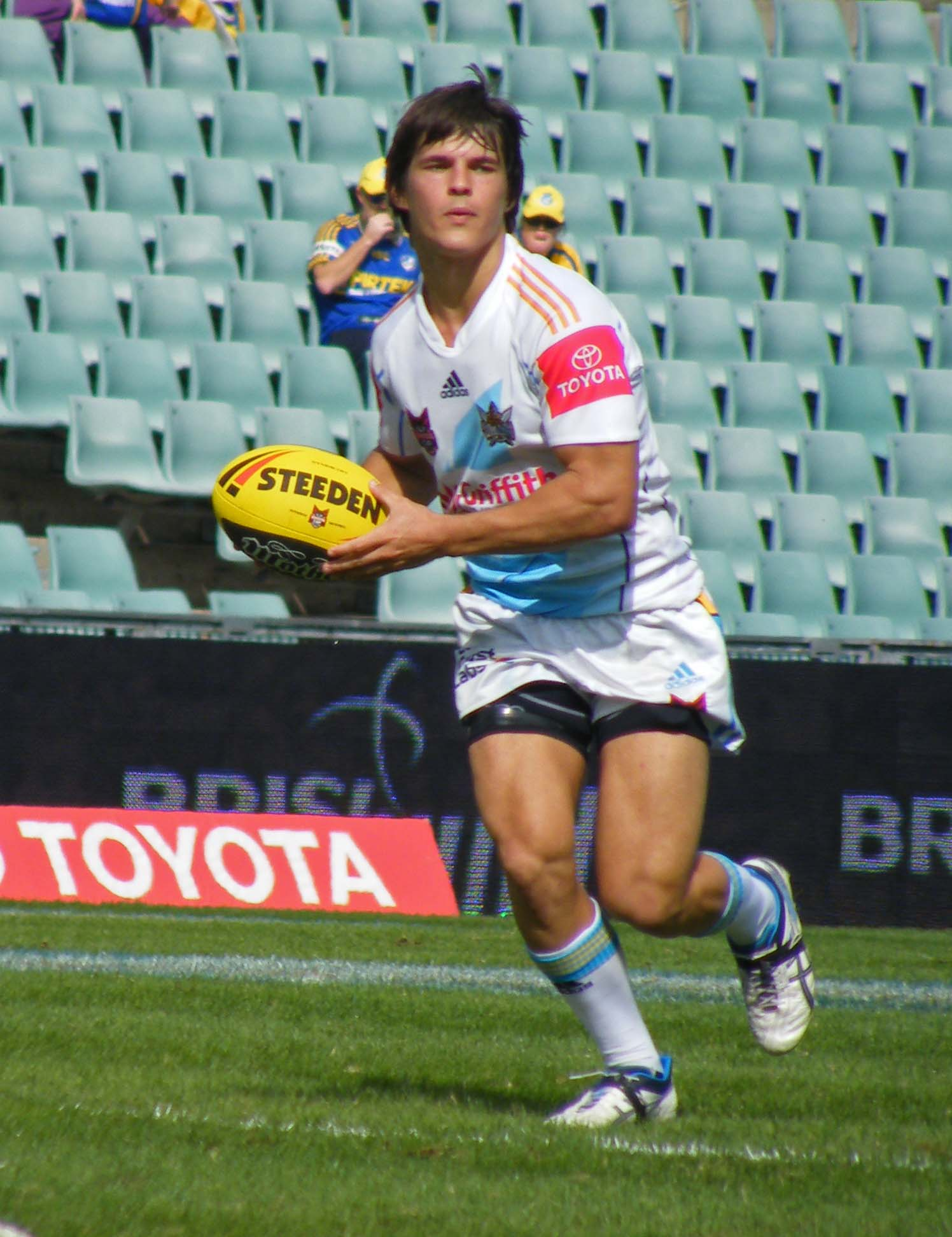
- Irwin playing for the Titans in 2011.

Personal information
- Born: 25 October 1992 (age 32); Darwin, Northern Territory, Australia
- Height: 171 cm (5 ft 7 in)
- Weight: 80 kg (12 st 8 lb)

Playing information
- Position: Hooker, Halfback
Club
Years	Team	Pld	T	G	FG	P
2013–15	Gold Coast Titans	10	0	0	0	0
2015	Featherstone Rovers	10	3	7	3	26
	Total	20	3	7	3	26
- Source: As of 30 October 2023

Sam Irwin (born 25 October 1992) is an Australian professional rugby league footballer who last played for Featherstone Rovers in the Championship. He plays as a hooker and halfback and previously played for the Gold Coast Titans in the National Rugby League.

== Background ==
Born in Darwin, Northern Territory, Irwin played his junior rugby league for the Nightcliff Dragons in the Darwin Rugby League competition before being signed by the Burleigh Bears in the Queensland Cup in 2010.

== Playing career ==
In 2011, Irwin joined the Gold Coast Titans. He played for the Titans' NYC team in 2011 and 2012. In round 6 of the 2013 NRL season, Irwin made his NRL début for the Gold Coast against the Parramatta Eels. On 11 September 2014, Irwin signed a two-year contract with Featherstone Rovers starting in 2015. In 2016, Irwin played for the Tweed Seagulls in the Queensland Cup competition.
