= James McManus (rugby league) =

Scottish-Australian rugby league footballer

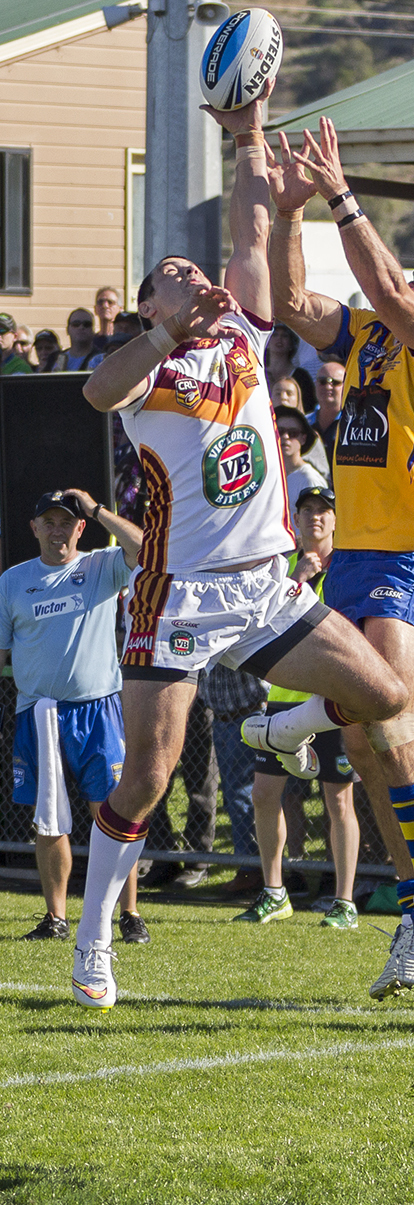

Personal information
- Born: 15 January 1986 (age 40) Banff, Aberdeenshire, Scotland

Playing information
- Height: 186 cm (6 ft 1 in)
- Weight: 91 kg (14 st 5 lb)
- Position: Wing
Club
Years	Team	Pld	T	G	FG	P
2007–15	Newcastle Knights	166	72	0	0	288
Representative
Years	Team	Pld	T	G	FG	P
2009–15	NSW Country	5	3	0	0	12
2009–14	New South Wales	3	1	0	0	4

James McManus (born 15 January 1986) is an Australian former professional rugby league footballer. A New South Wales State of Origin representative, he played for the Newcastle Knights in the National Rugby League as a winger.

== Background ==
McManus was born in Banff, Aberdeenshire, Scotland and moved to Darwin, Northern Territory, Australia at the age of nine after his father died and his mother married an Australian man. McManus played his junior rugby league for the Katherine Bushrangers, and later for the Palmerston Raiders in Northern Territory Rugby League competition, and graduated to the Northern Territory Institute of Sport's rugby league programme. He was signed by the Newcastle Knights while playing for the Northern Territory in Darwin in the Australian under-18s championships in 2003.

== Professional playing career ==
McManus played for the Knights in the Jersey Flegg Cup before graduating to their NSWRL Premier League team. He made his NRL début during the 2007 Newcastle Knights season. He was selected for Country in the City vs Country match on 8 May 2009. McManus got injured after playing one match for New South Wales rugby league team for the 2009 State of Origin series, therefore didn't take part in the rest of the series and resulting in McManus missing the second half of 2009 and the first half of 2010. On 13 March 2013, McManus re-signed with the Knights on a 3-year contract.

3 years after McManus' début in representative football, he returned to the representative arena, being selected for Country Origin again in 2012. On 7 July, McManus was named for the 2013 State of Origin decider following a string of strong performances at club level. For the third and deciding game of the 2013 State of Origin series McManus was selected as wing for New South Wales, and scored a try in the Blues' loss. McManus finished the 2013 NRL season as the league's equal leading try scorer with 19 for the regular season. He shared the award with David Simmons of Penrith and David Williams from Manly. McManus was selected on the wing for New South Wales for Game 3 of the 2014 State of Origin series.

On 3 May 2015, McManus played for New South Wales Country against New South Wales City in the 2015 City vs Country Origin. He scored a try.

After suffering a concussion in Round 20 of the 2015 season, McManus was sidelined for the rest of the year and it was speculated that he would be forced to retire. On 2 February 2016, it was announced that he would sit out the 2016 season and work through his options. He officially announced his retirement from rugby league on 10 August 2016.

He was eligible to play for the Scottish national rugby league team as he was born in Scotland.
