= Duncan MacGillivray =

Scotland international rugby league footballer

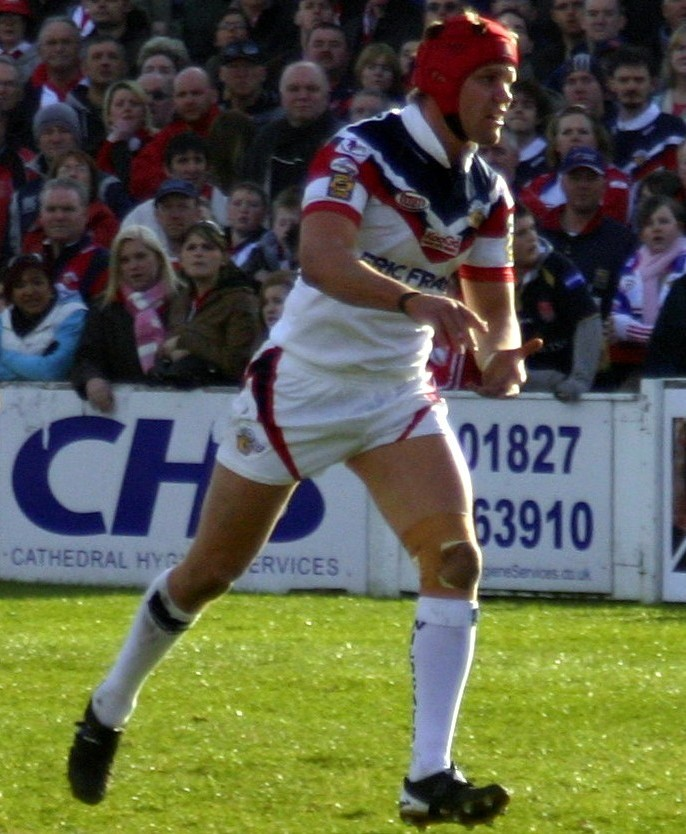

Personal information
- Full name: Duncan MacGillivray
- Born: 25 October 1976 (age 49) Darwin, Northern Territory, Australia

Playing information
- Height: 6 ft 2 in (1.87 m)
- Weight: 15 st 12 lb (101 kg)
- Position: Second-row, Prop
Club
Years	Team	Pld	T	G	FG	P
1996–01	Penrith Panthers	49	2	0	0	8
2002–03	South Sydney	23	0	0	0	0
2004–08	Wakefield Trinity Wildcats	98	6	0	0	24
	Total	170	8	0	0	32
Representative
Years	Team	Pld	T	G	FG	P
2005–08	Scotland	5	0	0	0	0

Duncan MacGillivray (born 25 October 1976) is a former Scotland international rugby league footballer who played as a second-row or prop in the 1990s and 2000s. He played at club level for the Penrith Panthers and the South Sydney Rabbitohs in the NRL, and the Wakefield Trinity Wildcats in the Super League, and at international level for Scotland.

== Background ==
He was born in Darwin, Northern Territory, Australia.

MacGillivray is a Nightcliff Dragons junior playing in the Darwin Rugby League competition.

== Playing career ==
He went on to making his name in the NRL spending five years with the Penrith Panthers, and playing for South Sydney Rabbitohs.

The former Scotland international had an excellent season with the Wildcats in 2006 and his form carried on into the following years. He retired at the end of the 2008 season after 5-seasons of service to the Wildcats.
