= Darwin Brothers =

Club information
- Full name: Darwin Brothers Rugby League Football Club
- Colours: Blue; White
- Founded: 1958
- Website: www.darwinbrothersrlfc.com

Current details
- Ground: Anula Park
- CEO: Johny (Bear) Adams
- Competition: Darwin Rugby League

Records
- Premierships: 16 (1966, 1967, 1970, 1973, 1974, 1984, 1988, 1989, 1990, 1991, 2004, 2009, 2010, 2012, 2014, 2020)

Darwin Brothers Rugby League Football Club is an Australian rugby league football club based in Anula, Northern Territory. The club was formed in 1958, and they conduct teams for both Juniors & Seniors teams.

== Notable Juniors ==
- Frank Stokes (Manly Warringah Rugby League NSWRL 50 first grade games)
- Peter Alley (Eastern Suburbs NSWRL now Sydney Roosters)
- Tom Nickels (Canberra Raiders NSWRL)

== See also ==
- Rugby league in the Northern Territory
