= Nightcliff Middle School =

Coeducational state school in Darwin, Australia

Coordinates: 12.378443°S 130.851814°E

Nightcliff Middle School is a coeducational state school situated between Nightcliff Road, Aralia Street and Ryland Road, in the northern Darwin suburb of Rapid Creek, Northern Territory, Australia.

== History ==
The school was named after the adjacent suburb of Nightcliff.

In the mid 1960s, planning had commenced for a high school to serve the region, but it was not until 8 July 1970 that Nightcliff High School was officially opened. 300 students, who had been temporarily housed in demountables at Darwin High School, transferred immediately to the new buildings. Following Cyclone Tracy, the new school, which had survived the devastation better than most buildings, was immediately pressed into service as an evacuation centre, then becoming a hostel for workers involved in the temporary repair of essential services. Following Cyclone Tracy, students of the school were temporarily enrolled to attend Casuarina High School situated approximately 8 kilometres away. The school was reopened in 1975 with classes starting at 7am to avoid heat as the air conditioning was not functioning.

After a successful "Lighthouse" program, in 2007, Nightcliff began transitioning to a Middle School and retained Years 8 and 9.

== Present day ==
In 2008, Nightcliff High School became a middle school for students in Years 7 to 9 and as a result was renamed Nightcliff Middle School.

== Sports ==
The school caters for a wide range of sport including; cricket, Aussie rules, soccer, tennis and martial arts.

Nightcliff Middle School is also the home of the Nightcliff Tigers Baseball Club.
