= Joel Romelo =

Australian rugby league footballer

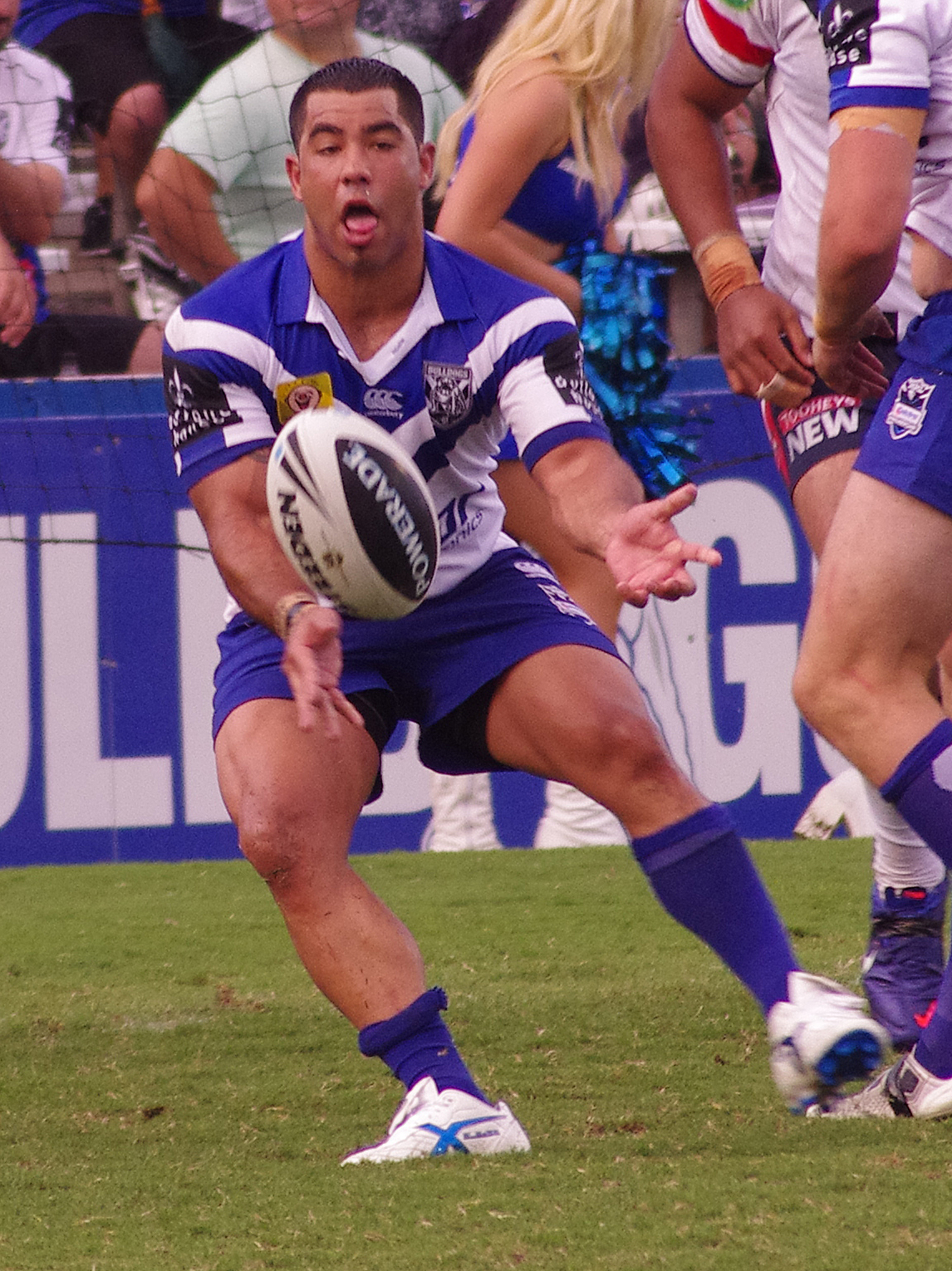
- Romelo playing for the Bulldogs in 2012

Personal information
- Born: 3 April 1989 (age 37) Darwin, Northern Territory, Australia
- Height: 170 cm (5 ft 7 in)
- Weight: 88 kg (13 st 12 lb)

Playing information
- Position: Hooker, Five-eighth
Club
Years	Team	Pld	T	G	FG	P
2009	Penrith Panthers	3	0	0	0	0
2010–13	Canterbury Bulldogs	23	4	0	0	16
2014	Melbourne Storm	2	0	0	0	0
	Total	28	4	0	0	16
Representative
Years	Team	Pld	T	G	FG	P
2013	Indigenous All Stars	1	0	0	0	0

Joel Romelo (born 3 April 1989) is a former Australian professional rugby league footballer who previously played for the Penrith Panthers, Canterbury-Bankstown Bulldogs and Melbourne Storm in the NRL. He primarily played at hooker but could fill in at five-eighth and halfback. Romelo is of Indigenous Australian and Italian descent.

== Early life ==
Born in Darwin, Northern Territory, Romelo played junior football for the Nightcliff Dragons in the Darwin Rugby League.

Romelo moved to Brisbane, Queensland as a 12-year-old and was educated at Redcliffe State High School. He continued playing junior football for the Redcliffe Dolphins before being signed by the Cronulla-Sutherland Sharks.

== Playing career ==
Romelo played for Cronulla-Sutherland's Jersey Flegg before joining Penrith.

In 2008, he signed with the Penrith Panthers and played for the Panthers' Toyota Cup in 2008 and 2009, scoring 22 tries in 41 games. In February 2009, Romelo came to blows with Panthers teammate, Trent Waterhouse after Waterhouse resented a tackle by Romelo in training. In Round 8 of the 2009 NRL season Romelo made his NRL debut for the Panthers against the Canberra Raiders. He went on to play 2 more games in first-grade that year. After the conclusion of the 2009 season, Romelo was named in the 2009 NYC Team of the Year.

In March 2010, Romelo signed a contract with the Canterbury-Bankstown Bulldogs. After playing in Canterbury's NSW Cup reserve-grade side, Romelo made his debut for Canterbury-Bankstown against his former club, Penrith, in round 11 of the 2010 NRL season. In the 2012 NRL season, Romelo played 13 games for Canterbury as the club won the Minor Premiership. Romelo did not feature in the club's finals campaign or the 2012 NRL Grand Final loss to Melbourne.

On 23 January 2014, Romelo signed a one-year contract with the Melbourne Storm starting in the same year. On 6 November 2014, Romelo signed with Queensland Cup team Eastern Suburbs Tigers full time for the 2015 season.

== Controversy ==
In 2007, Romelo was sacked by Cronulla-Sutherland for disciplinary reasons.

Early in 2010, Romelo was sacked from the Penrith club for disciplinary reasons. It was later revealed that Romelo was terminated due to a drink driving offence. Romelo spoke to the Daily Telegraph saying "I lost my licence for DUI, so I catch the train to Homebush and back, It's about a 45-minute trip and I have to change at Lidcombe and then walk to the training ground from Olympic Park station, "I went through a difficult time and I've got mixed emotions about Penrith. On one hand I was badly behaved, but there were other players who did much worse and who weren't sacked. I'm not going to say who they were because I've still got heaps of mates there, but it did feel like there were double standards".

In 2016, Romelo was charged following a police bust of an alleged ice-dealing syndicate in Darwin. Romelo was arrested after a tip-off through the Dob in a Dealer campaign. Romelo was pulled over by police and was found to have 14g of methamphetamine in the vehicle. Police then raided Romelo's home finding another 2g of methamphetamine and $10,000 in cash, and arrested another associate who was at the property. Romelo was in breach of bail and was remanded in custody to appear again on 4 May 2016.

In August 2017, Romelo was jailed for two years and disqualified from driving for the same period over drug dealing charges.

In 2019, Romelo was jailed for three years and four months after being convicted of two high speed chases in stolen cars and a brutal attack on his ex-girlfriend which broke her eye socket. It was alleged that Romelo ripped chunks from her hair, punched and choked her until she almost lost consciousness, because she didn't give him her phone passcode.

== Representative career ==
Romelo has played for the Queensland Schoolboys.

In 2011, Romelo was announced as a member of the Italy squad that will compete in the 2013 World Cup qualifying matches.

On 16 January 2013, Romelo was voted into the Indigenous All Stars team by the fans to play the NRL All Stars team in the 2013 All Stars match.
