= Nightcliff Dragons =

Australian rugby league football club

Nightcliff Dragons RLFC

Club information
- Full name: Nightcliff Dragons Rugby League Football Club
- Nickname: Dragons
- Colours: Red; White; Green
- Founded: 1961
- Website: www.nightcliffdragons.com

Current details
- Ground: Sanderson Middle School Sanderson, Nightcliff
- CEO: Kevin Page
- Competition: Darwin Rugby League

Records
- Premierships: 16 (1962/63,1963/64,1968,1969,1975, 1987,1992,1999,2000 2001,2002 2005, 2006, 2015)
- Runners-up: 1 (1966,1967,1971,1977,1985,1993,1994,1995,1998,)

Nightcliff Dragons Rugby League Club is an Australian rugby league football club based in Nightcliff, Northern Territory formed in 1961. They conduct teams for both junior and senior teams and run preseason academies for both youth boys and youth girls.

== Notable juniors ==
- Michael Mclean (1983-1997 (AFL) Footscray, Brisbane Bears)
- Duncan MacGillivray (1996-03 South Sydney Rabbitohs & Penrith)
- Joel Romelo (2009-14 Canterbury Bulldogs, Melbourne Storm & Penrith Panthers)
- Sam Irwin (2013-14 Gold Coast Titans)
- Chris Smith (2015- Penrith Panthers & Sydney Roosters)
