= Territory Rugby League Stadium =

Football stadium in Marrara, Northern Territory

- Interactive map of Territory Rugby League Stadium
- Location: Marrara, Northern Territory
- Coordinates: 12°23′47″S 130°53′12″E
- Owner: Northern Territory Government
- Capacity: 1,250
- Type: Rugby League-specific stadium
- Surface: Grass
- Field shape: Rectangular

Construction
- Opened: 2019
- Cost: A$ 25m
- General contractor: Halikos Construction

Tenant
- NRL Northern Territory

The Territory Rugby League Stadium is a football stadium in Marrara, Northern Territory, Australia. It opened in 2019 as the home ground of NRL Northern Territory clubs.

== History ==
The Northern Territory Rugby League (now the NRL Northern Territory) had been using the Richardson Park as its main venue. However due to rising maintenance cost it abandoned the facility in February 2014. In 2012, the league began lobbying governments to help it move to Warren Park, a sports complex in Marara.

The Northern Territory government committed to the construction of a rugby league-dedicated stadium within the Warren Park in November 2016. The design for the stadium was unveiled by the NT government the following year.

The Territory Rugby League Stadium later opened on 19 May 2019.

The Deadly Cup was played there.

On 10 June 2025, the stadium was selected for the venue of the 2027 AFC Asian Cup qualification between the national soccer teams of Timor-Leste and Maldives. This fixture was considered as the first major continental competition event to be held in the Northern Territory.

== Facilities ==
The Territory Rugby League Stadium has a grandstand with a 1,250 seating capacity which can be expanded as needed. The whole stadium including the grass hill areas can support 10,000 people.

== International fixtures ==
Date	Competition	Team #1	Score	Team #2	Attendance
10 June 2025	2027 AFC Asian Cup qualification	Timor-Leste	1–0	Maldives	1,048
9 October 2025	2027 AFC Asian Cup qualification	Timor-Leste	1–4	Philippines	1,356
18 November 2025	2027 AFC Asian Cup qualification	Timor-Leste		Tajikistan	
