= Palmerston Raiders =

Australian rugby league team

Club information
- Full name: Palmerston Raiders Rugby League Football Club
- Colours: Lime Green; Yellow; Blue; White
- Founded: 1961
- Website: http://www.palmerstonraiders.org.au

Current details
- Ground: Goodline Park, Palmerston
- Competition: Darwin Rugby League

Records
- Premierships: 1 (2013, 2022)
- Runners-up: 3 (2014, 2015, 2016)

Palmerston Raiders Rugby League Club is an Australian rugby league football club based in Palmerston, Northern Territory formed in the late 1962. They conduct teams for both junior and senior teams.

== Notable Juniors ==
- James McManus (2007-15 Newcastle Knights)
