= Nightcliff =

- Suburb
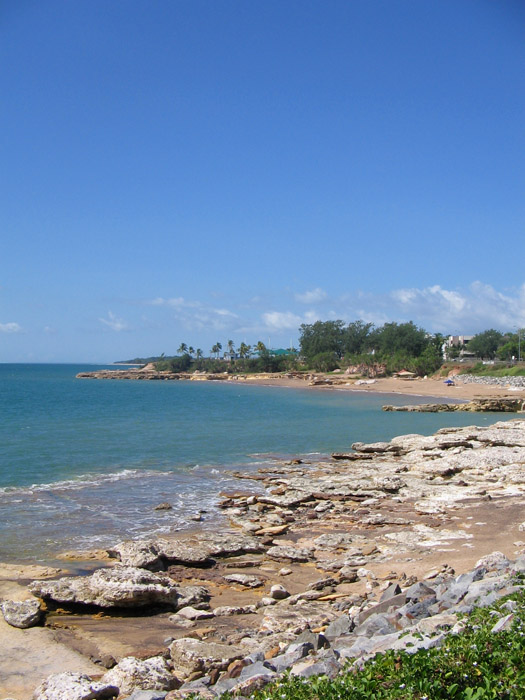
- Darwin, Nightcliff

- Interactive map of Nightcliff
- Coordinates: 12.383°S 130.849°E
- Country: Australia
- State: Northern Territory
- City: Darwin
- LGA: City of Darwin
- Location: 10 km (6.2 mi) from Darwin

Government
  - Territory electorate: Nightcliff
  - Federal division: Solomon

Area
  - Total: 1.5 km^{2} (0.58 sq mi)

Population
  - Total: 3,884 (SAL 2021)
- Postcode: 0810
Suburbs around Nightcliff
Darwin Harbour; Rapid Creek	Rapid Creek	Rapid Creek
Darwin Harbour	Nightcliff	Rapid Creek; Coconut Grove
Darwin Harbour; East Point	East Point; Coconut Grove	Coconut Grove

Nightcliff is a northern suburb of the city of Darwin, Northern Territory, Australia. It is the traditional country and waterways of the Larrakia people.

== History ==
Although the origin of the name Nightcliff has always been surrounded by conjecture and controversy, the naming can be tracked back to 8 September 1839. Early that day, HMS Beagle, which was engaged on an excursion of the Australian coast, sailed into the area and anchored in Shoal Bay near Hope Inlet. John Lort Stokes, Charles Cordington Forsyth and several other crew members left Beagle on a longboat for an excursion and passed around Lee Point, in the vicinity of which, there appeared to be a major opening. Stokes was later to record.

"The sea breeze setting in early, we did not reach it till after dark, when we landed for observations at a cliffy projection near the eastern entrance point: this we found to be composed of a kind of clay, mixed with calcareous matter. We had some difficulty in landing, and then in scrambling up the cliffs by the light of a lantern. If any of the watchful natives happened at the time to be on the look out, they must have stood in astonishment at beholding such strange persons, who at such a time of night, with no ostensible object were visiting their shores".

The term 'Night Cliff' was thus applied to the locality, and it subsequently appeared in this form on Surveyor-General George W. Goyder's original plan of 1869. Goyder also mentioned the locality a couple of times in the diary he kept as leader of the Northern Territory Survey Expedition. Despite these well established facts, many people have insisted that the name was derived from a misspelling of the name of John George Knight, one of the best known government officials in Darwin for nearly two decades prior to his death in 1892. It was known that Knight enjoyed visiting the Nightcliff environs and it is believed that he spent long periods of contemplation on the cliff tops. As late as 1952, a former resident who had lived in Darwin between 1876 and 1926 wrote to the Northern Territory News insisting that the area was known during that period as "Knightscliff". It is evident that many Territorians have preferred this variant form of name in deference to one of the most highly distinguished local public figures of the late nineteenth century. However, records show that Knight did not arrive in Darwin until 1873, several years after the publication of Goyder's map.

The Nightcliff foreshore was the site of Royal Australian Air Force camps with spotlights and large guns used to defend Darwin from bombing during the Second World War. During 1941, a naval outpost including a large concrete artillery outpost bunker was established on the headland. Various other defence facilities were constructed inland as large numbers of military personnel moved into the area. The 2/14 Field Regiment A.I.F. (Australian Infantry Force) was given the task of planning and constructing a hutted camp which became known as "Night Cliff's Camp". After the war, increasing pressure for suburban development caused the Nomenclature Committee of the N.T. to officially name the area on 29 October 1948. The conjoint version of the name, "Nightcliff" was adopted.

== Facilities ==
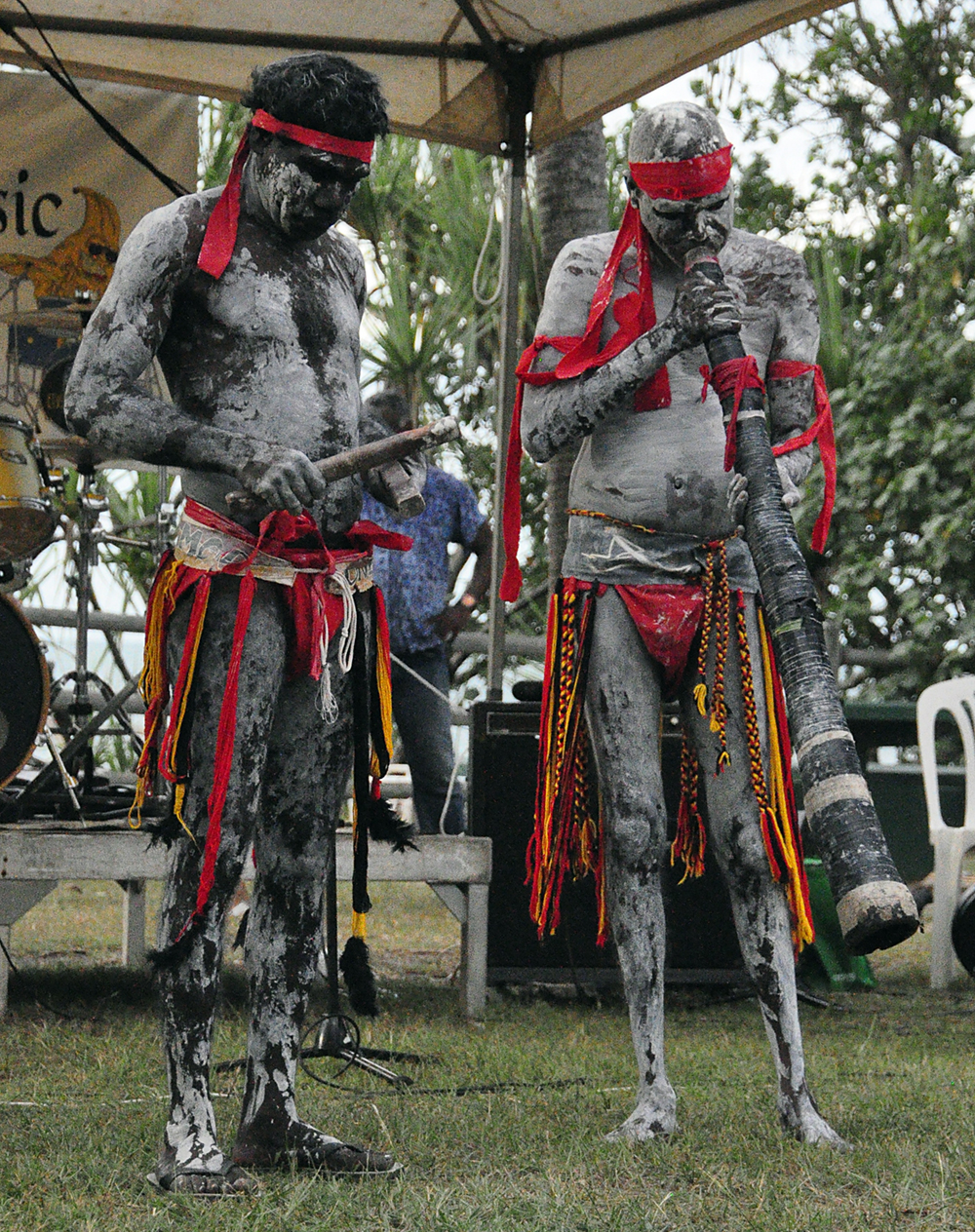
Didgeridoo and Clapstick players performing at Nightcliff, Northern Territory

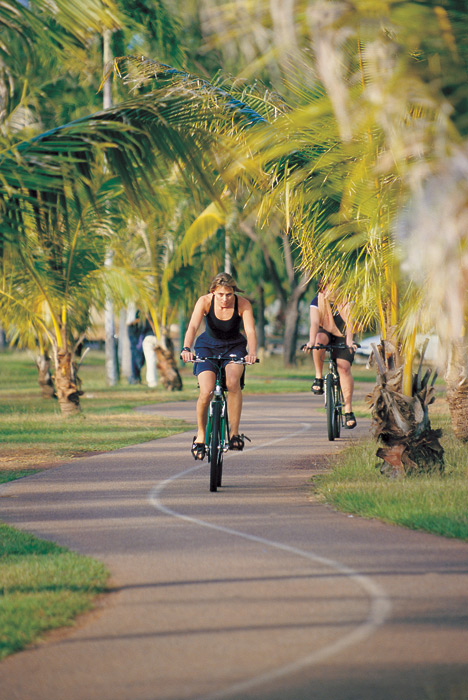
Nightcliff bike path

Today, a long footpath along the foreshore of Nightcliff is used for walking and cycling, particularly in the evenings after work. Along the footpath there is Nightcliff Jetty, Nightcliff Beach and Nightcliff Swimming Pool.

On Sundays, the Nightcliff Markets occur from 6am to 2pm. The stalls at the markets are mainly food and drinks but there is also craft and massage stalls. A live music band usually plays music on the stage in the middle of the markets.

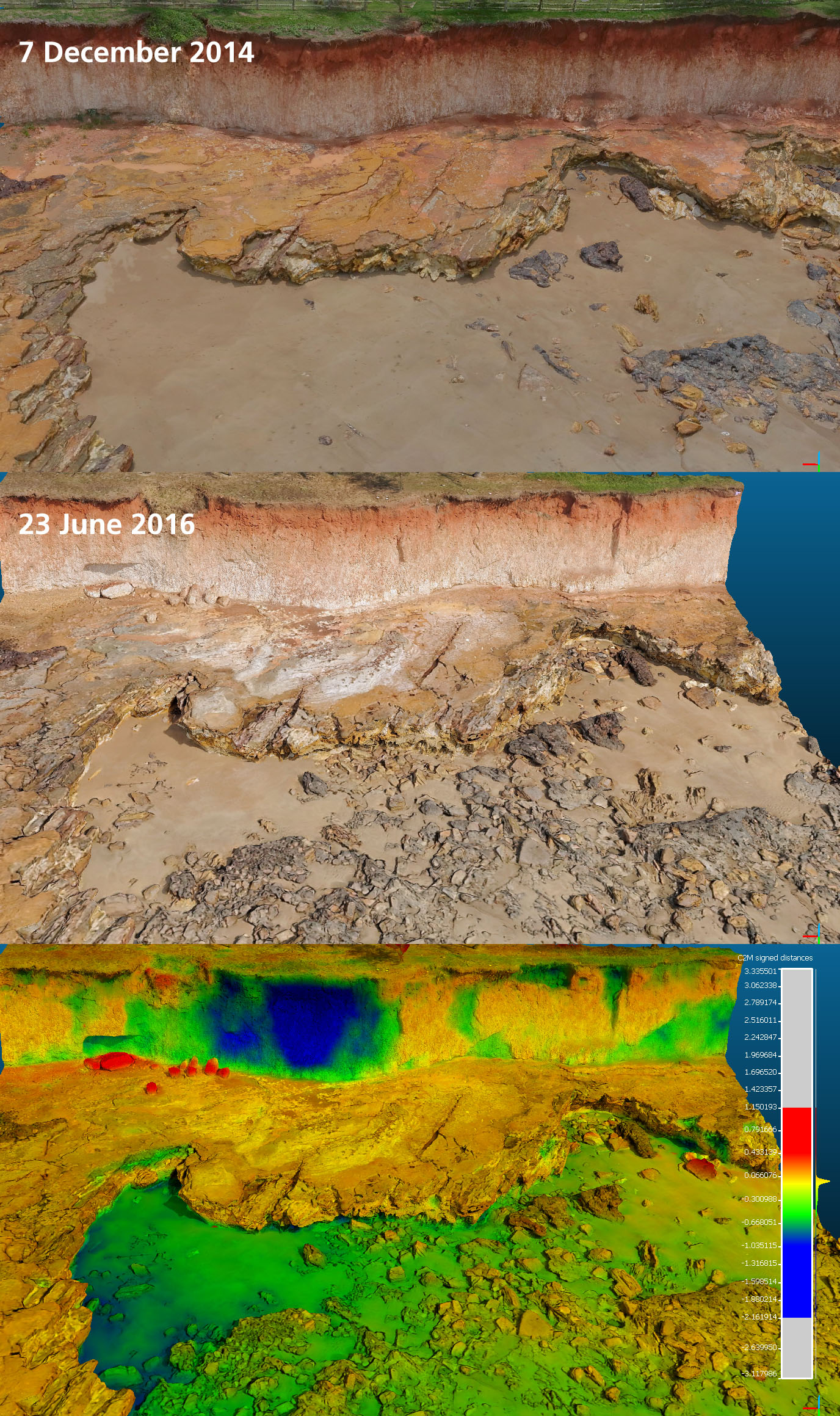
Nightcliff Coastal Erosion

The Nightcliff area is generally associated with its sister suburb, Rapid Creek, and the adjacent northern suburbs of Millner and Coconut Grove. Nightcliff has arguably become one of Darwin's most popular suburbs, as it is mostly situated directly on the coastal fringe. A lot of development has been completed on the coastal road, Casuarina Drive.

Several well-known and long-established sports clubs are associated with the Nightcliff regional area, including the Nightcliff Football Club and the Nightcliff Dragons, Nightcliff Baseball Club.

Close to the foreshore is Nightcliff Primary School, one of Darwin's oldest schools. Nightcliff Middle School provides education for student in years 7 to Year 9.

== Coastal erosion ==
The cliffs of Nightcliff are being actively eroded and around 2 m (7 ft) or more of cliff loss has been recorded in the 2014–2016 period. Areas of Nightcliff have been shored up using concrete boulders to form a sea wall.

== Events and festivals ==
The Nightcliff Seabreeze Festival, which first started in 2005, is held on the second week of May in the suburb of Nightcliff. It offers the opportunity for local talent to be showcased, and a popular event is Saturday family festivities along the Nightcliff foreshore, which is one of Darwin's most popular fitness tracks.
