= The Amazing Race 9 =

Season of television series

- Season 9
- Region 1 DVD cover
- Presented by: Phil Keoghan
- No. of teams: 11
- Winners: BJ Averell and Tyler MacNiven
- No. of legs: 12
- Distance traveled: 59,000 mi (95,000 km)
- No. of episodes: 12

Release
- Original network: CBS
- Original release: February 28 – May 17, 2006

Additional information
- Filming dates: November 7 – December 3, 2005

Series chronology
- ← Previous; Season 8 Next → Season 10

The Amazing Race 9 is the ninth season of the American reality competition show The Amazing Race. Hosted by Phil Keoghan, it featured eleven teams of two, each with a pre-existing relationship, competing in a race around the world. After the previous season's Family Edition, which had families of four racing around North America, this season returned to the classic format of having teams of two racing around the world. This season visited five continents and ten countries, traveling approximately 59,000 miles (95,000 km) over twelve legs. Filming took place from November 7 to December 3, 2005. Starting in Morrison, Colorado, outside of Denver, racers traveled through Brazil, Russia, Germany, Italy, Greece, Oman, Australia, Thailand, and Japan, before returning to the United States, traveling through Alaska, and finishing back in Morrison, Colorado. The season premiered on CBS on February 28, 2006, and concluded on May 17, 2006.

Best friends BJ Averell and Tyler MacNiven were the winners of this season, while friends Eric Sanchez and Jeremy Ryan finished in second place, and dating couple Ray Whitty and Yolanda Brown-Moore finished in third place.

== Format ==
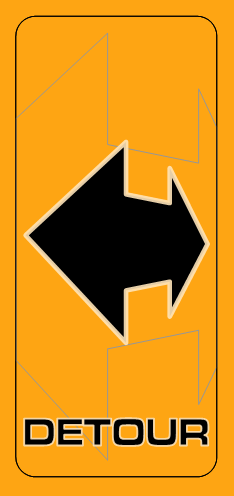
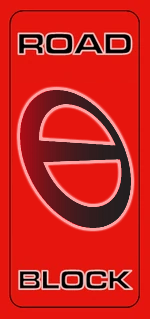
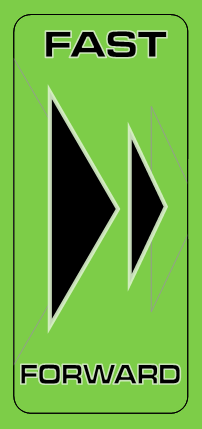
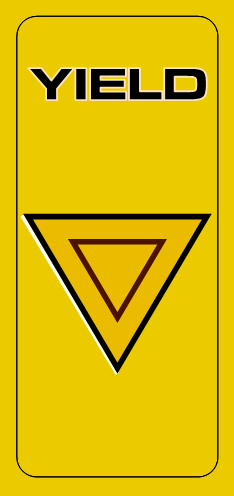
The clues which contestants receive during the course of the race generally fall into five categories: Route Info, Detour, Roadblock, Fast Forward, and Yield.

The Amazing Race is a reality television show created by Bertram van Munster and Elise Doganieri, and hosted by Phil Keoghan. The series follows teams of two competing in a race around the world. Each leg of the race requires teams to deduce clues, navigate foreign environments, interact with locals, perform physical and mental challenges, and travel on a limited budget provided by the show. At each stop during the leg, teams receive clues inside sealed envelopes, which fall into one of these categories:

- Route Info: These are simple instructions that teams must follow before they can receive their next clue.
- Detour: A Detour is a choice between two tasks. Teams may choose either task and switch tasks if they find one option too difficult. There is usually one Detour present on each leg.
- Roadblock: A Roadblock is a task that only one team member can complete. Teams must choose which member will complete the task based on a brief clue they receive before fully learning the details of the task. There is usually one Roadblock present on each leg.
- Fast Forward: A Fast Forward is a task that only one team may complete, which allows that team to skip all remaining tasks on the leg and go directly to the next Pit Stop. Teams may only claim one Fast Forward during the entire race.
- Yield: The Yield allows one team to force another team to stop racing for a predetermined amount of time before they can continue the race. Teams may use the Yield only one time during the entire race.

Most teams who arrive last at the Pit Stop of each leg are progressively eliminated, while the first team to arrive at the finish line in the final episode wins the grand prize of US$1,000,000.

== Production ==
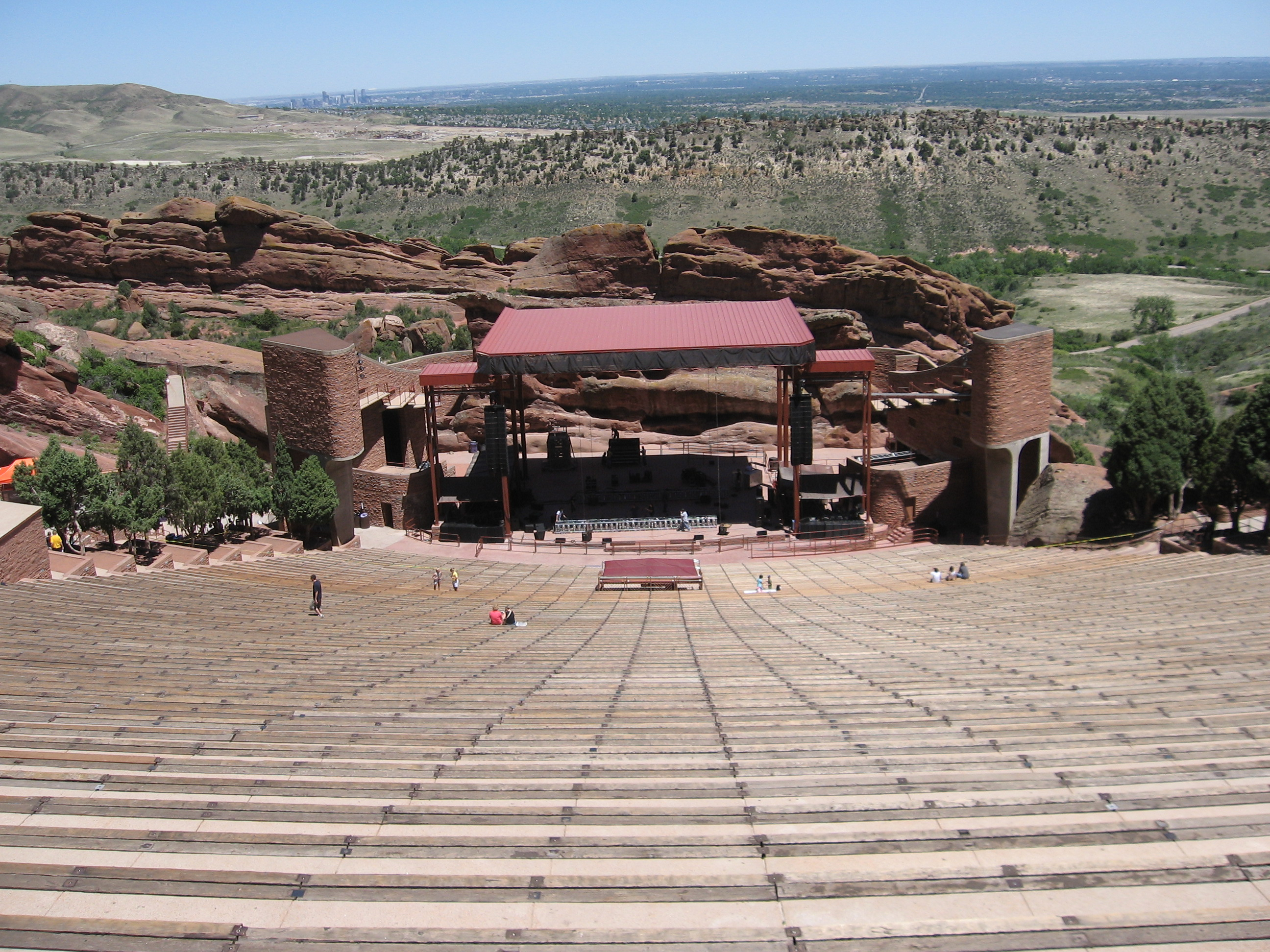
The ninth season of Amazing Race started and ended at the Red Rocks Amphitheatre outside of Denver.

=== Casting ===
Applications for the season were accepted from June 1, 2005 to July 26, 2005. Semi-finalist interviews occurred during September 2005, and finalist interviews were conducted in October 2005.

=== Development and filming ===
Filming for this season began on November 7, 2005, with teams spotted at Denver International Airport. By November 22, Phil Keoghan stated in an interview with The Salt Lake Tribune that he was filming "somewhere near the Middle East", which was later revealed to be Oman. Teams were in Australia by late November with the show filming on Rottnest Island near Perth on November 23 and at Crocodylus Park in Darwin, Northern Territory, on November 25. The Amazing Race 9 lasted 27 days, during which participants traveled over 59,000 miles (95,000 km), and concluded on December 3, 2005. This season visited ten countries on five continents, three of which were new: Greece, Japan, and Oman.

== Contestants ==
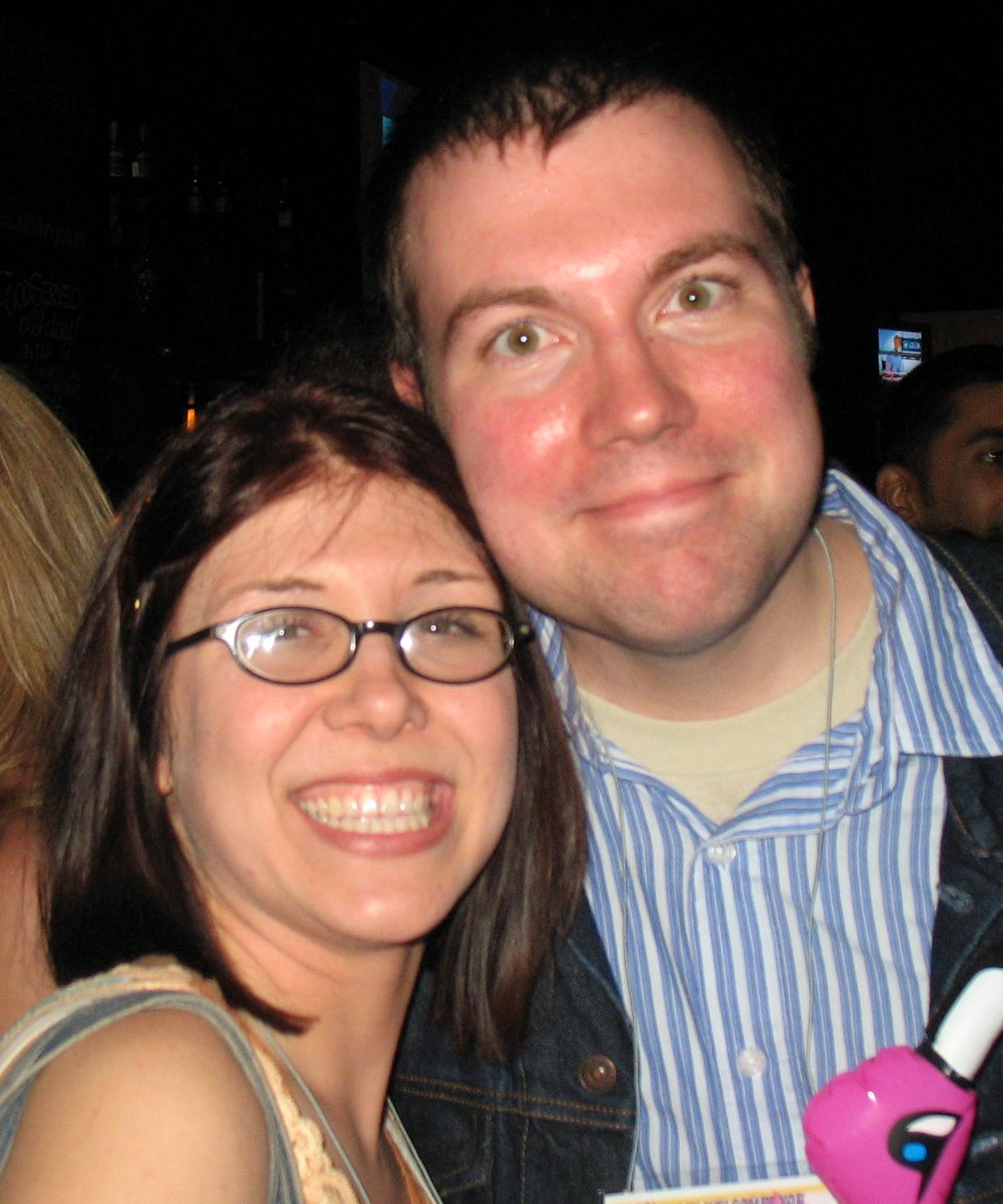
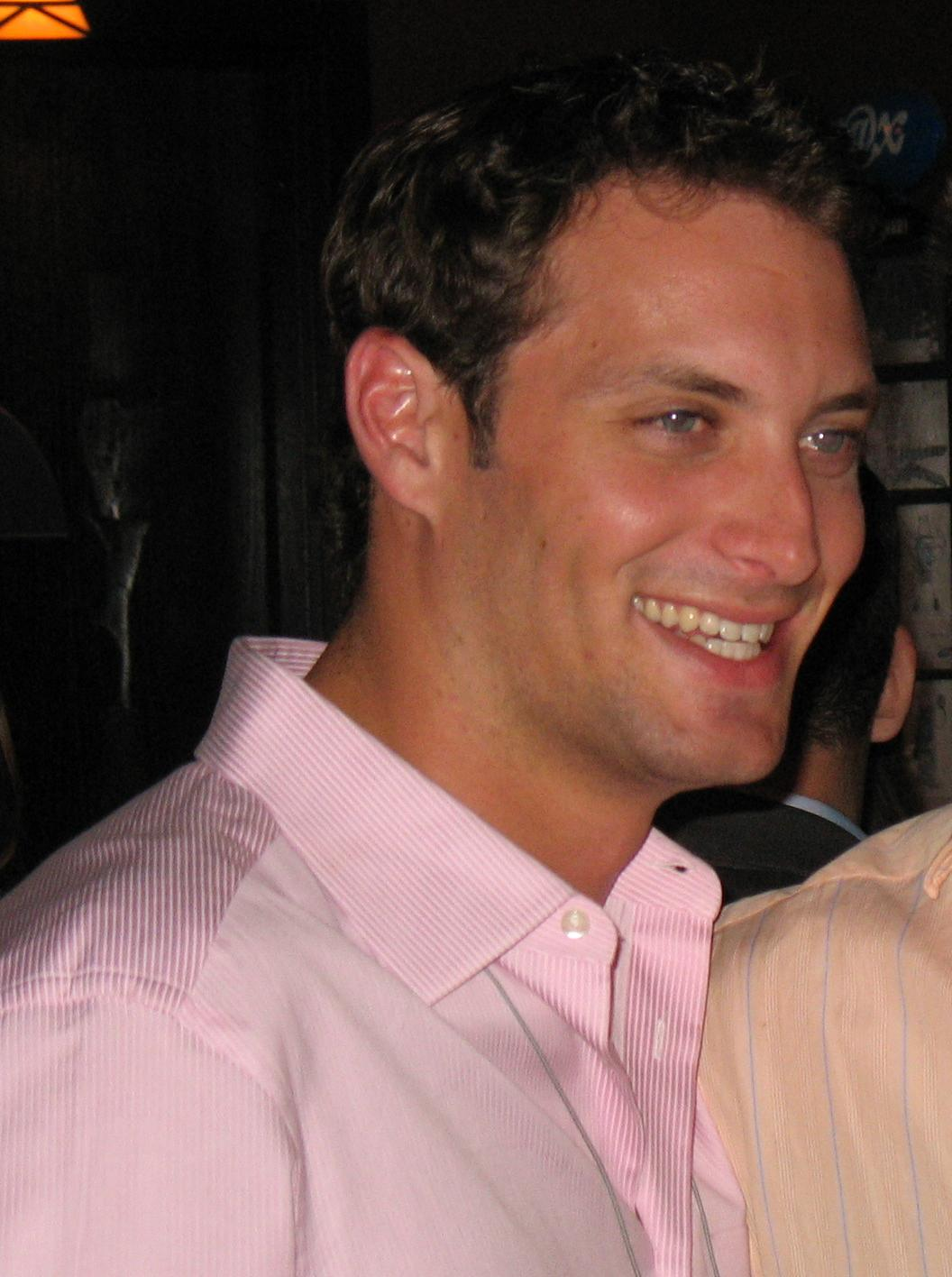
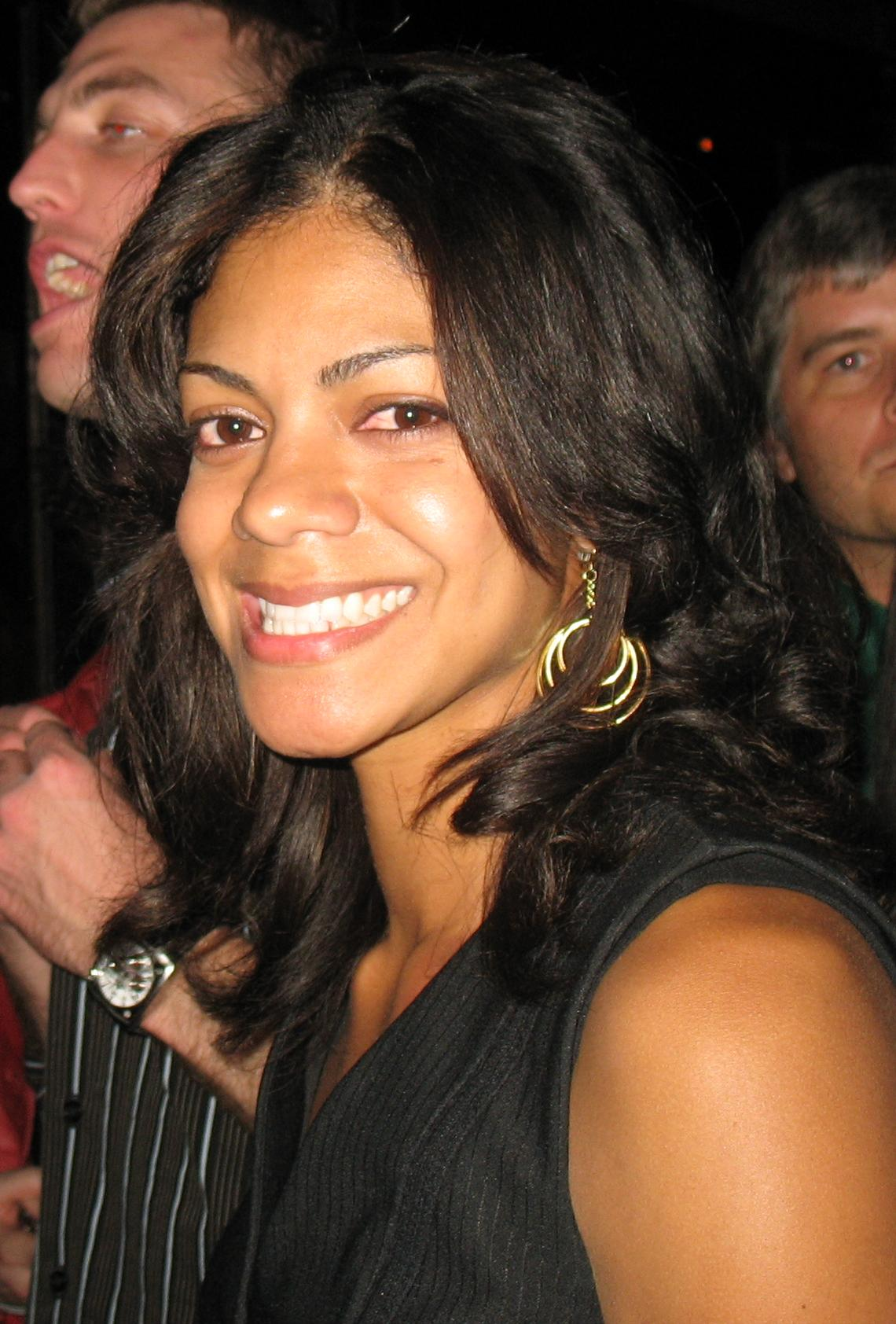
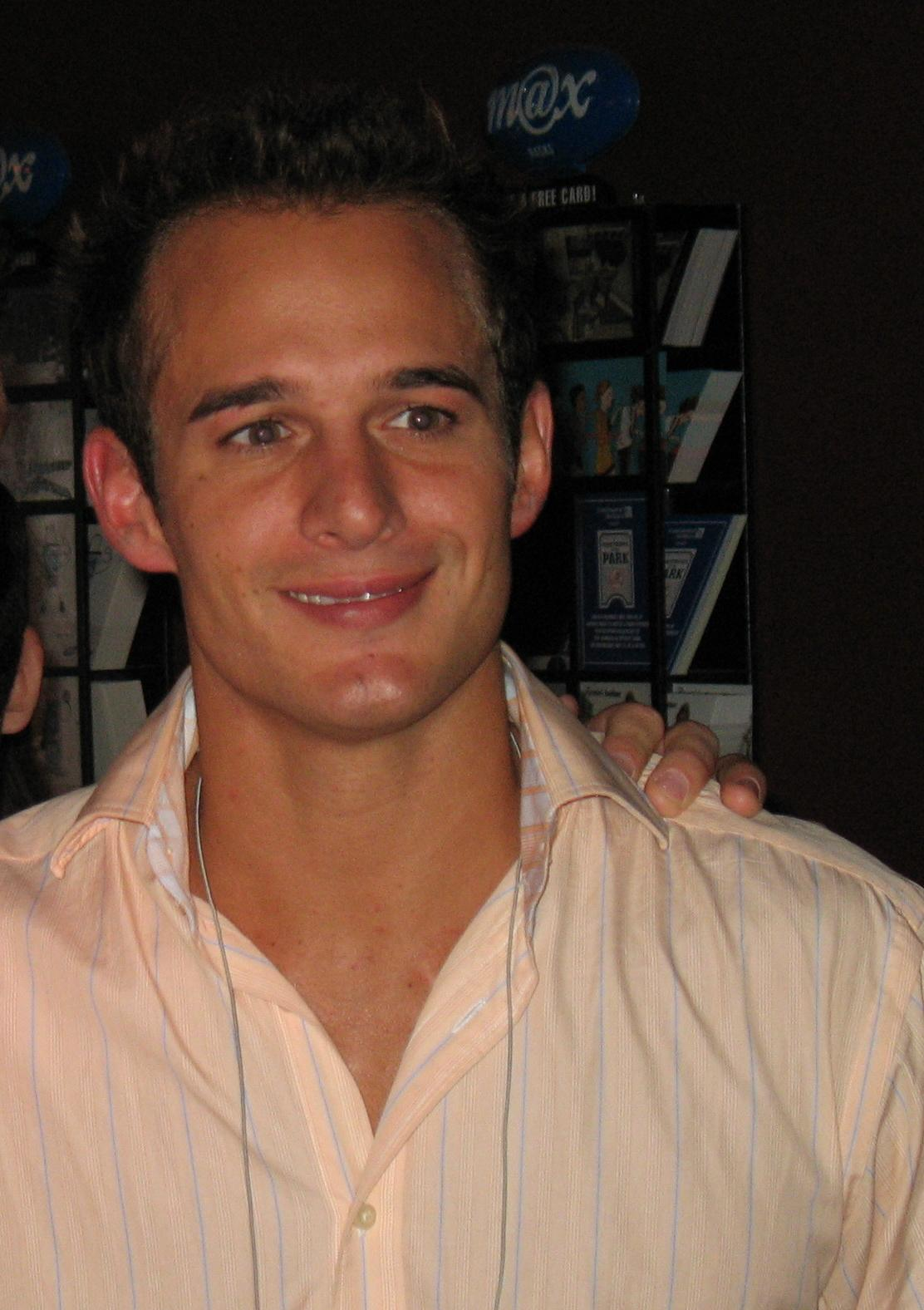
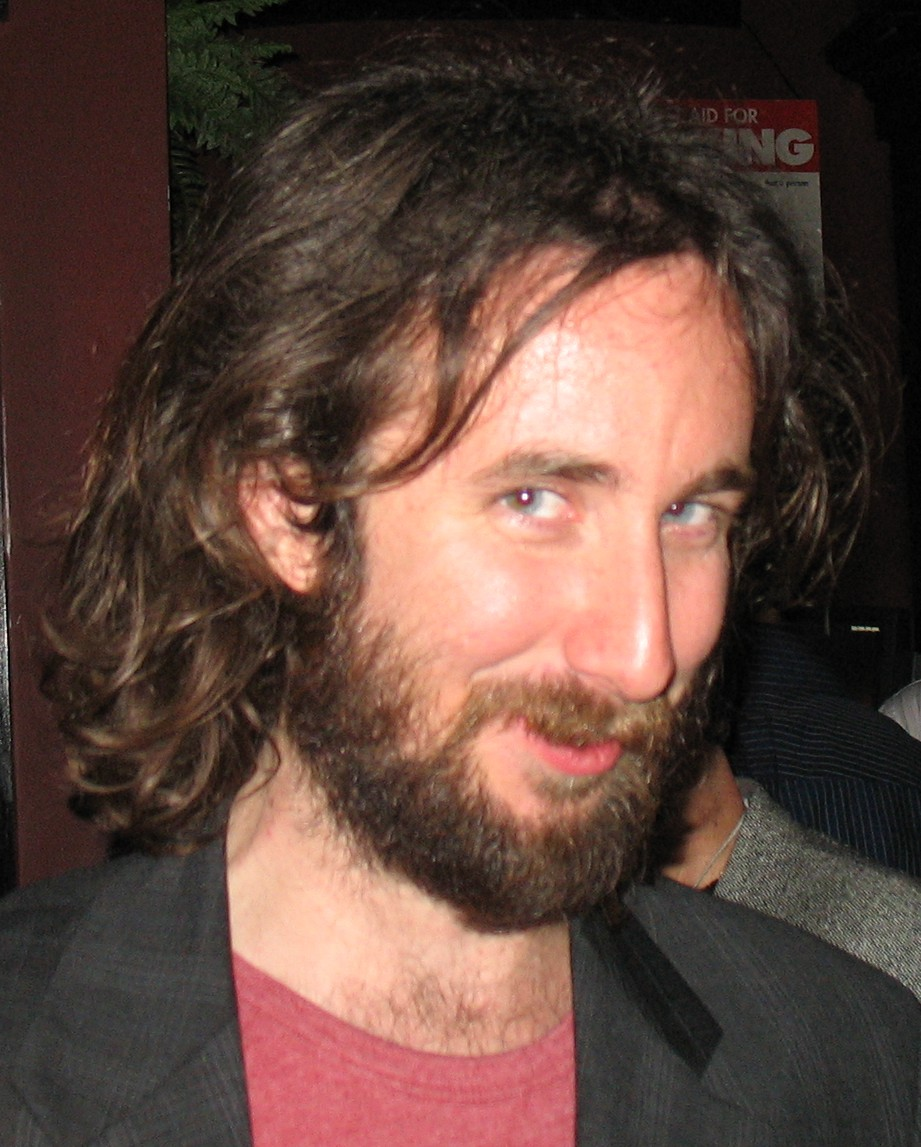
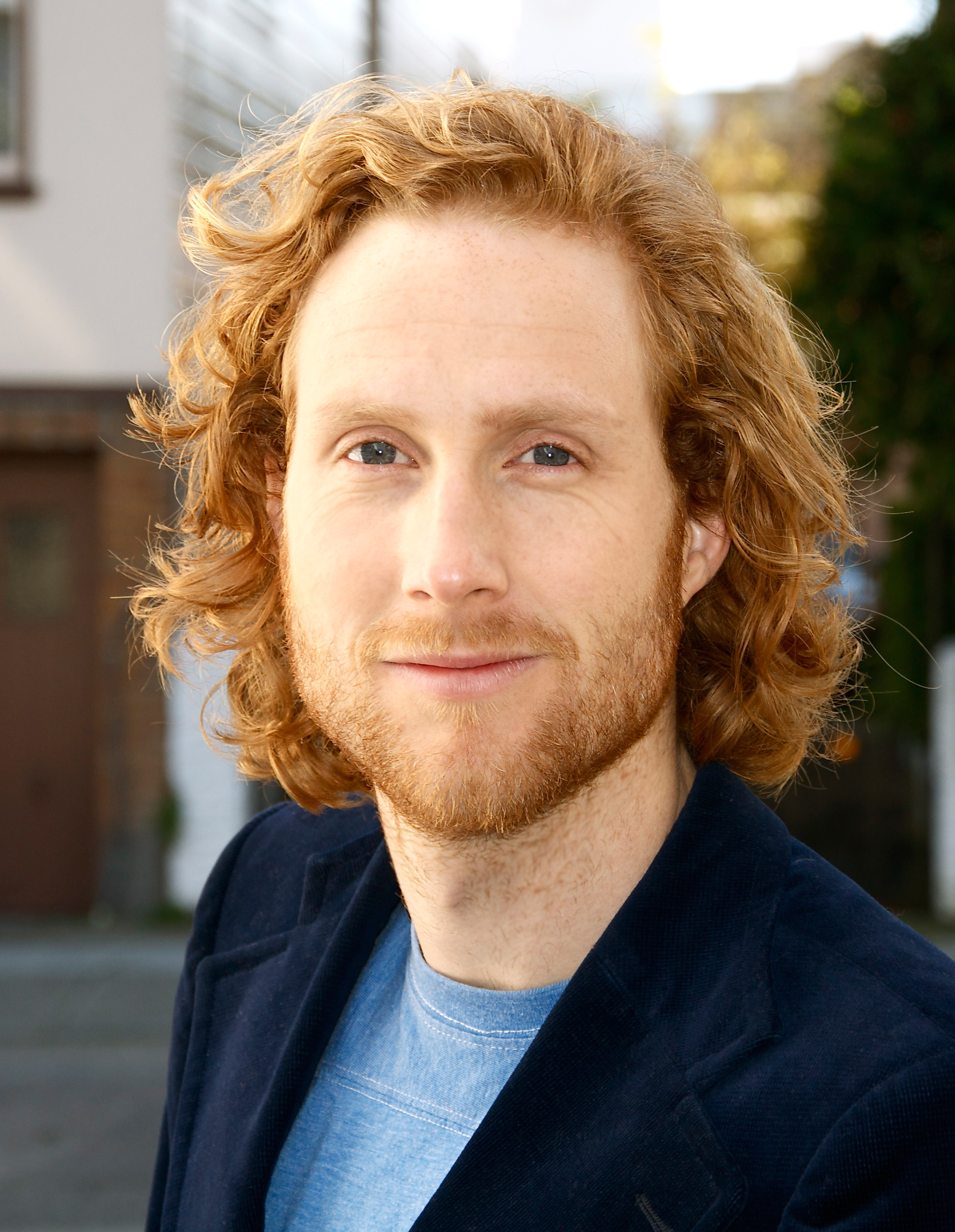
From left to right: Lori Willems, Dave Spiker, Joseph Meadows, Yolanda Brown-Moore, Eric Sanchez, BJ Averell, and Tyler MacNiven

Ray Whitty proposed to Yolanda Brown-Moore on The Early Show the morning after the season finale, and she accepted. The Early Show also showed their full progress on the final leg of The Amazing Race, including Yolanda's progress on the final Roadblock.

Contestants	Age	Relationship	Hometown	Status
John Lowe	38	Lifelong Friends	Dorchester, Massachusetts	Eliminated 1st (in São Paulo, Brazil)
Scott Braginton-Smith	41	Lifelong Friends	West Harwich, Massachusetts	Eliminated 1st (in São Paulo, Brazil)
Lisa Hinds	48	Sisters	Santa Rosa Beach, Florida	Eliminated 2nd (in Brotas, Brazil)
Joni Glaze	44	Sisters	Katy, Texas	Eliminated 2nd (in Brotas, Brazil)
Wanda Lopez-Rochford	44	Mother & Daughter	Smyrna, Georgia	Eliminated 3rd (in Munich, Germany)
Desiree Cifre	24	Mother & Daughter	New York City, New York	Eliminated 3rd (in Munich, Germany)
Danielle Turner	22	Childhood Friends	Staten Island, New York	Eliminated 4th (in Calatafimi-Segesta, Italy)
Dani Torchio	22	Childhood Friends	Staten Island, New York	Eliminated 4th (in Calatafimi-Segesta, Italy)
Dave Spiker	30	Dating	Manhattan, Kansas	Eliminated 5th (in Syracuse, Italy)
Lori Willems	25	Dating	Manhattan, Kansas	Eliminated 5th (in Syracuse, Italy)
Lake Garner	37	Married Parents	Hattiesburg, Mississippi	Eliminated 6th (in Rio, Greece)
Michelle Garner	36	Married Parents	Hattiesburg, Mississippi	Eliminated 6th (in Rio, Greece)
Fran Lazarus	61	Married 40 Years	Silverthorne, Colorado	Eliminated 7th (in Fremantle, Australia)
Barry Lazarus	63	Married 40 Years	Silverthorne, Colorado	Eliminated 7th (in Fremantle, Australia)
Joseph Meadows	23	Dating	Fort Smith, Arkansas	Eliminated 8th (in Bangkok, Thailand)
Monica Cayce	23	Dating	Fort Smith, Arkansas	Eliminated 8th (in Bangkok, Thailand)
Ray Whitty	27	Dating	Chicago, Illinois	Third place
Yolanda Brown-Moore	27	Dating	Chicago, Illinois	Third place
Eric Sanchez	27	Friends	Deerfield Beach, Florida	Runners-up
Jeremy Ryan	26	Friends	Pompano Beach, Florida	Runners-up
BJ Averell	26	Best Friends	Los Angeles, California	Winners
Tyler MacNiven	25	Best Friends	San Francisco, California	Winners

Future appearances

Eric Sanchez and Danielle Turner, now dating long-distance, returned for The Amazing Race: All-Stars. Jeremy Ryan also appeared in the closing minutes of the season finale. After The Amazing Race: All-Stars, Sanchez and Turner announced in an interview that they were no longer dating due to the distance and were now just friends.

== Results ==
The following teams are listed with their placements in each leg. Placements are listed in finishing order.

- A red placement with a dagger (†) indicates that the team was eliminated.
- An underlined blue placement with a double-dagger (‡) indicates that the team was the last to arrive at a Pit Stop in a non-elimination leg. As a penalty, they were stripped of their money, bags, and possessions other than their passports and the clothes they were wearing upon checking in, and they received no money at the start of the next leg.
- An italicized placement indicates a team's placement at the midpoint of a double leg.
- A green ƒ indicates that the team won the Fast Forward.
- A brown > indicates that the team used the Yield and a brown < indicates the team on the receiving end of the Yield.

Team placement (by leg)
Team	1	2	3a (Note: This was a double leg with two Detours and two Roadblocks shown over two episodes. The placements listed for the first half are the order of the teams' arrival at the Pit Stop in Moscow.)	3b	4	5	6	7	8	9	10	11	12
BJ & Tyler	2nd	1st	4th	2nd	1st	2nd	5th	5th‡	3rd	4th‡> (Note: BJ and Tyler chose to Yield Joseph and Monica.)	1stƒ	1st	1st
Eric & Jeremy	1st	2nd	1st	1st	2nd	1st	1stƒ	4th	1st	2nd	2nd	2nd	2nd
Ray & Yolanda	7th	5th	3rd	7th	7th	6th	3rd (Note: Ray and Yolanda initially arrived 2nd, but were issued a 15-minute penalty for taking a bus instead of a train to the Isthmos Train Station. Joseph and Monica checked in during this penalty time, dropping Ray and Yolanda to 3rd.)	3rd	4th	1st	3rd	3rd‡	3rd
Joseph & Monica	6th	3rd	8th	6th	3rd	3rd	2nd	2nd	2nd	3rd<	4th†		
Fran & Barry	8th	9th	5th	4th	4th	4th	4th	1st	5th†				
Lake & Michelle	5th	7th	2nd	3rd	5th> (Note: Lake and Michelle chose to Yield Danielle and Dani.)	5th	6th†						
Dave & Lori	4th	4th	9th	5th	6th	7th†							
Danielle & Dani	9th	8th	6th	8th	8th†<								
Wanda & Desiree	3rd	6th	7th	9th†									
Lisa & Joni	10th	10th†											
John & Scott	11th†												

== Race summary ==
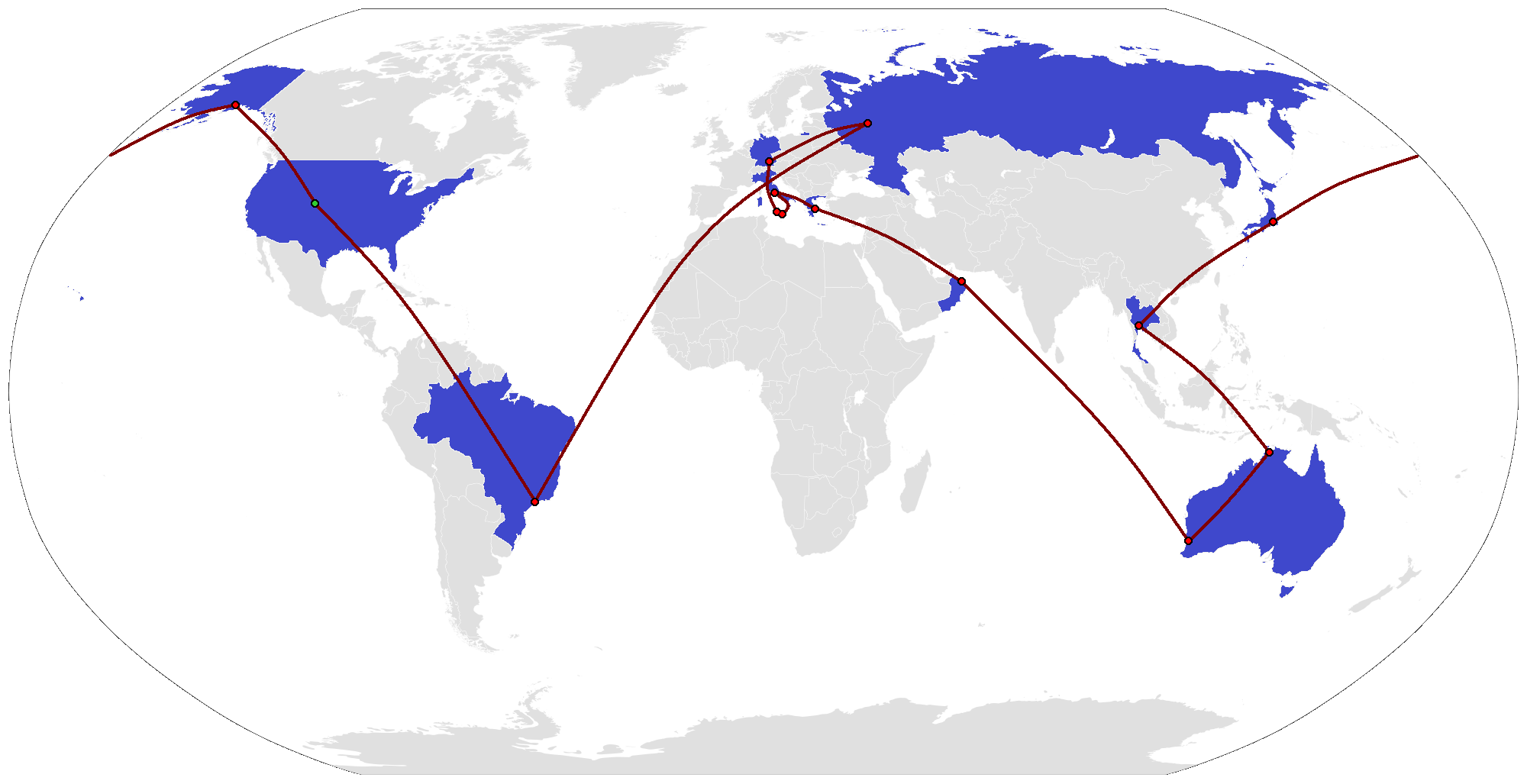
The route of The Amazing Race 9.

Destinations	Air travel Rail travel Water travel Bus travel Helicopter travel Bicycle travel Gondola travel
Route Markers	Detour Roadblock Fast Forward Yield Pit Stop

=== Leg 1 (United States → Brazil) ===
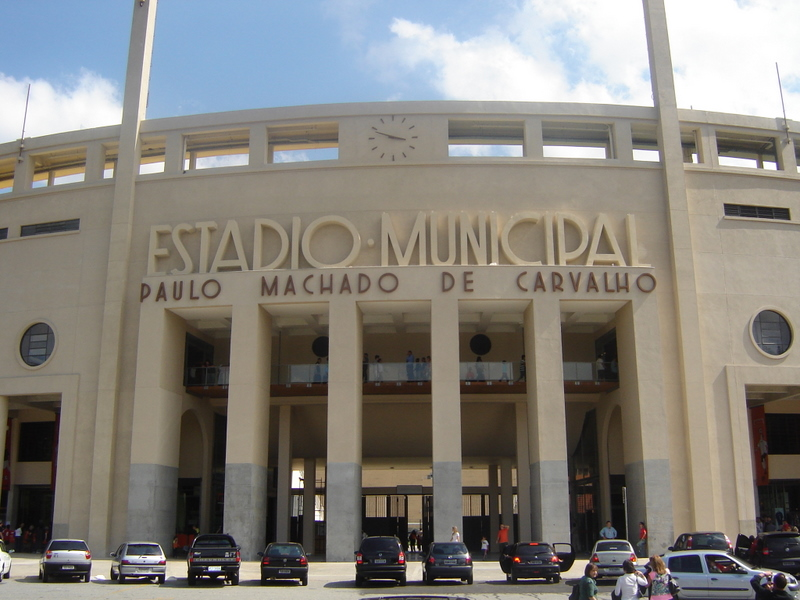
The Estádio Municipal Paulo Machado de Carvalho in São Paulo's district of Pacaembu was the first Pit Stop of the race.

- Episode 1: "Here We Go, Baby, Off to Win a Million Bucks!" (February 28, 2006)
- Prize: US$10,000 each (awarded to Eric and Jeremy)
- Eliminated: John and Scott

Locations

- Morrison, Colorado (Red Rocks Park – Red Rocks Amphitheatre) (Starting Line)
- Denver (Denver International Airport) → São Paulo, Brazil
- São Paulo (Hotel Unique)
- São Paulo (Viaduto Santa Efigênia)
- São Paulo (Caverna Moto Peças or Campo de Marte Airport)
- São Paulo (Santa Cecília – Vavá Artigos Religiosos E Esotéricos) (Unaired)
- São Paulo (Santa Cecília – 114A Rua Frederico Abranches)
- São Paulo (Estádio Municipal Paulo Machado de Carvalho)

Episode summary

- Teams set off from Red Rocks Amphitheatre and drove to Denver International Airport, where they had to book one of the three flights to São Paulo, Brazil. While the three flights were scheduled to arrive within 30 to 35 minutes of one other, some of those arrival times changed due to flight delays. Once in São Paulo, teams had to travel to the rooftop of the Hotel Unique to find their next clue, which directed them to the Viaduto Santa Efigênia.
- This season's first Detour was a choice between Motor Head or Rotor Head. In Motor Head, teams had to travel to a motorcycle shop and assemble a motorcycle using the parts provided along with a finished model for reference. When the motorcycle was properly assembled and the mechanic could start the bike, teams received their next clue. In Rotor Head, teams had to travel to Campo de Marte Airport, where they had to use a flight directory to locate one of three buildings from a helicopter; each location varied in distance with only a limited number of tickets provided for each. Once teams found their destination, the pilot landed the helicopter on the rooftop of that building so that teams could search a designated area for their next clue.
- After the Detour, teams had to find a sanctuary on Rua Federico Abranches and light a candle as part of a traditional ceremony known as Candomblé in order to receive their next clue, which directed them to the Pit Stop at the Estádio Municipal Paulo Machado de Carvalho.

Additional note

- After the Detour, the clue instructed teams to travel to the district of Santa Cecília and find the Vavá store to purchase the white candle they were later shown lighting in the sanctuary; this portion of the task was unaired.

=== Leg 2 (Brazil) ===
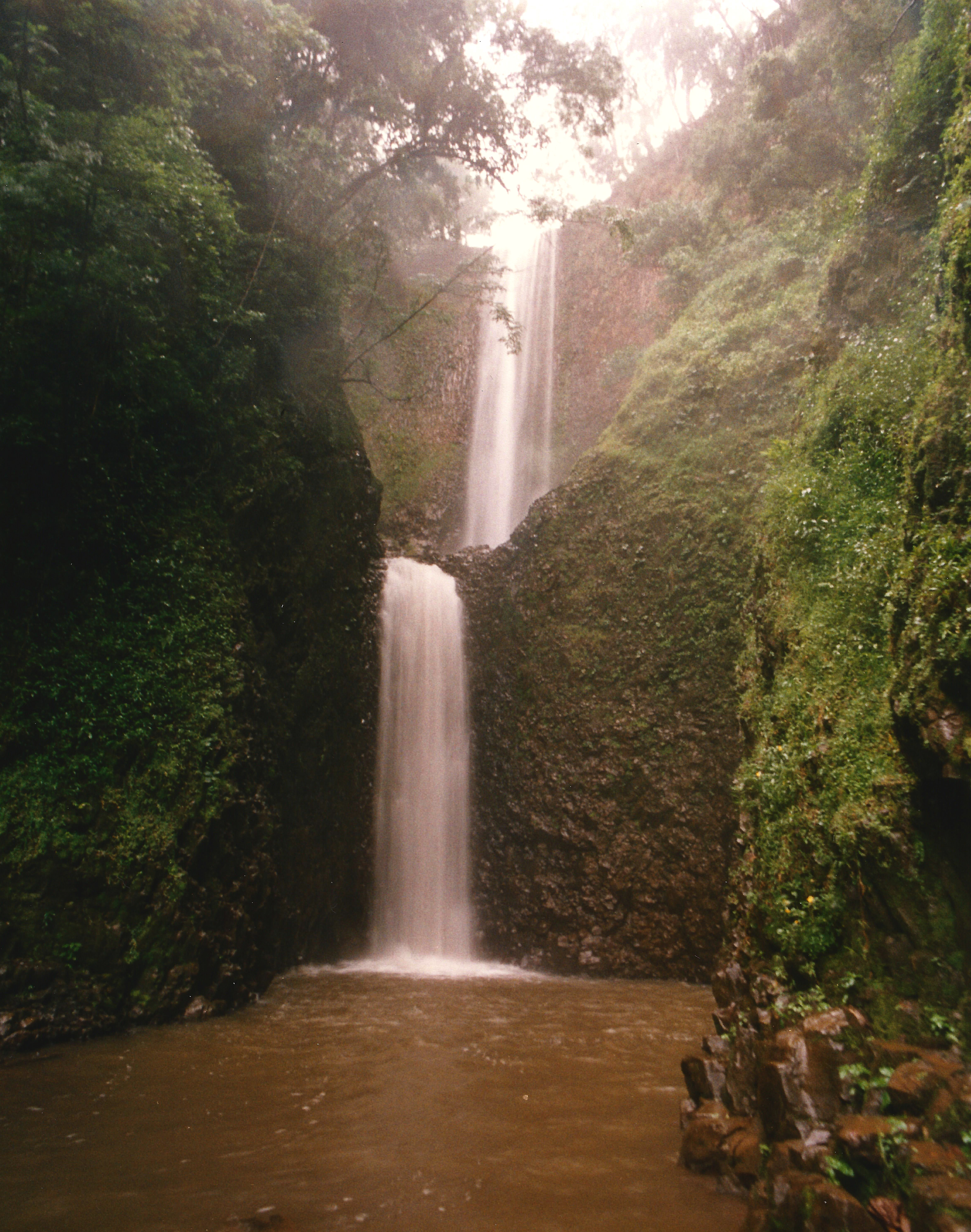
Teams traveled to the outskirts of Brotas, where one of Detour tasks required teams to hike to and climb a waterfall.

- Episode 2: "I'm Filthy, and I Love It" (March 7, 2006)
- Prize: A trip to Tahiti (awarded to BJ and Tyler)
- Eliminated: Lisa and Joni

Locations

- São Paulo (Estádio Municipal Paulo Machado de Carvalho)
- São Paulo (Edifício Copan)
- São Paulo (Terminal Rodoviário Barra Funda) → Brotas (Terminal Rodoviário de Brotas)
- Brotas (Camping Bela Vista or Usina Jacaré)
- Brotas (Fazenda Primavera da Serra)

Episode summary

- At the start of this leg, teams were instructed to travel to Edificio Copan and search for Bloco F to find their next clue.
- In this season's first Roadblock, one team member had to climb one of three stairwells on the building's fire escape. Once at the top, they had to put on a harness and rappel 400 feet (120 m) down the building in order to receive their next clue.
- After the Roadblock, teams traveled to the Terminal Rodoviário Barra Funda and had to find tickets for one of three charter buses leaving the next day to Brotas. Once there, teams had to search the bus terminal for a marked car with their next clue.
- This leg's Detour was a choice between Press It or Climb It. In Press It, teams had to drive to Camping Bela Vista to process raw sugar cane and distill its juice. Teams then had to make 500 milliliters of ethanol to fuel their cars as an alternative fuel source. After completing the task, teams received their next clue. In Climb It, teams had to drive to Usina Jacaré and hike to a nearby waterfall. Once there, they climbed 90 feet (27 m) to the top of the waterfall using mechanical ascenders in order to receive their next clue.
- After the Detour, teams had to check in at the Pit Stop: the Fazenda Primavera da Serra coffee plantation.

=== Leg 3 (Brazil → Russia → Germany) ===
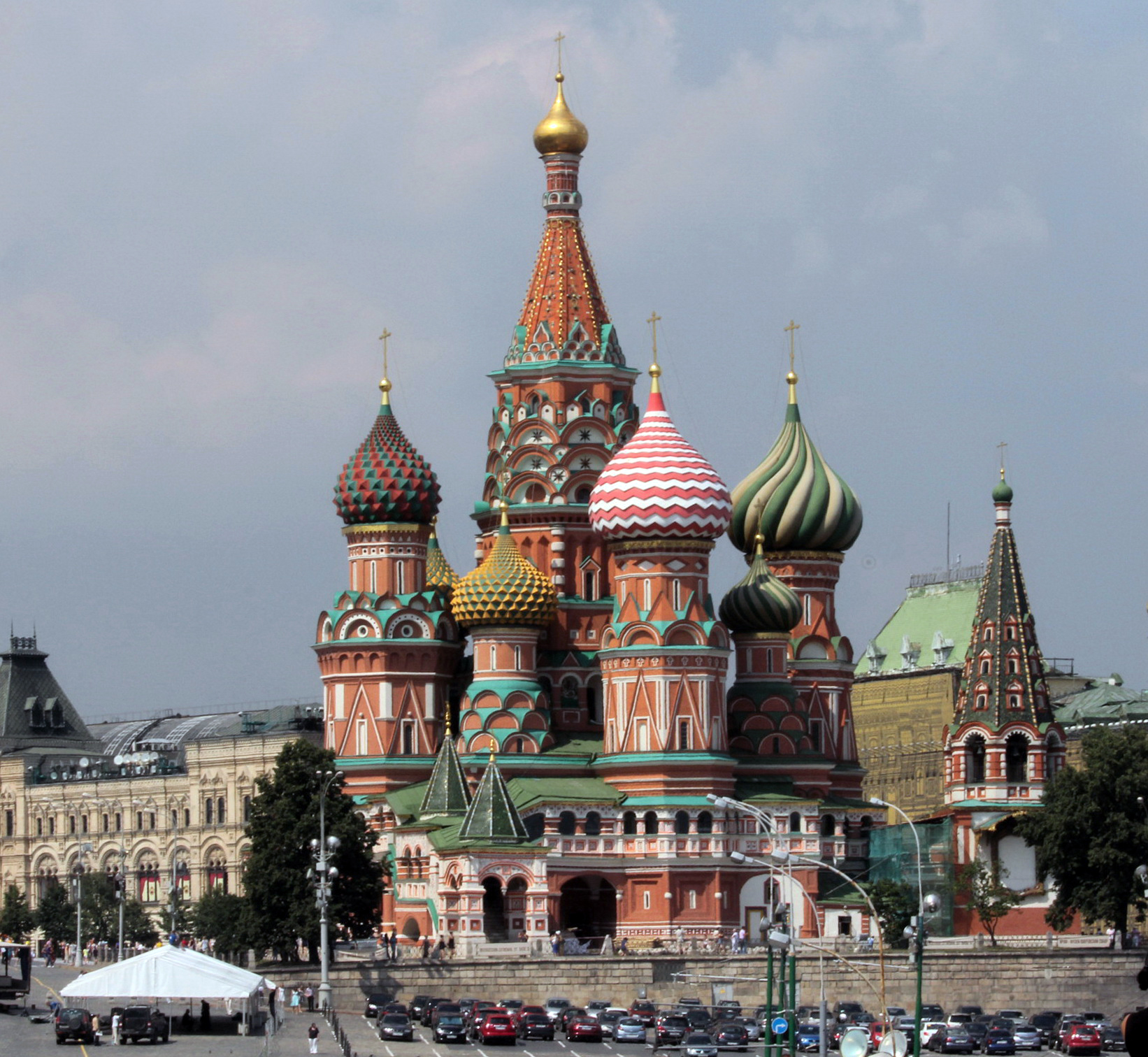
In this double-length leg, teams visited Moscow's famous Red Square, overlooking Saint Basil's Cathedral in the first half...

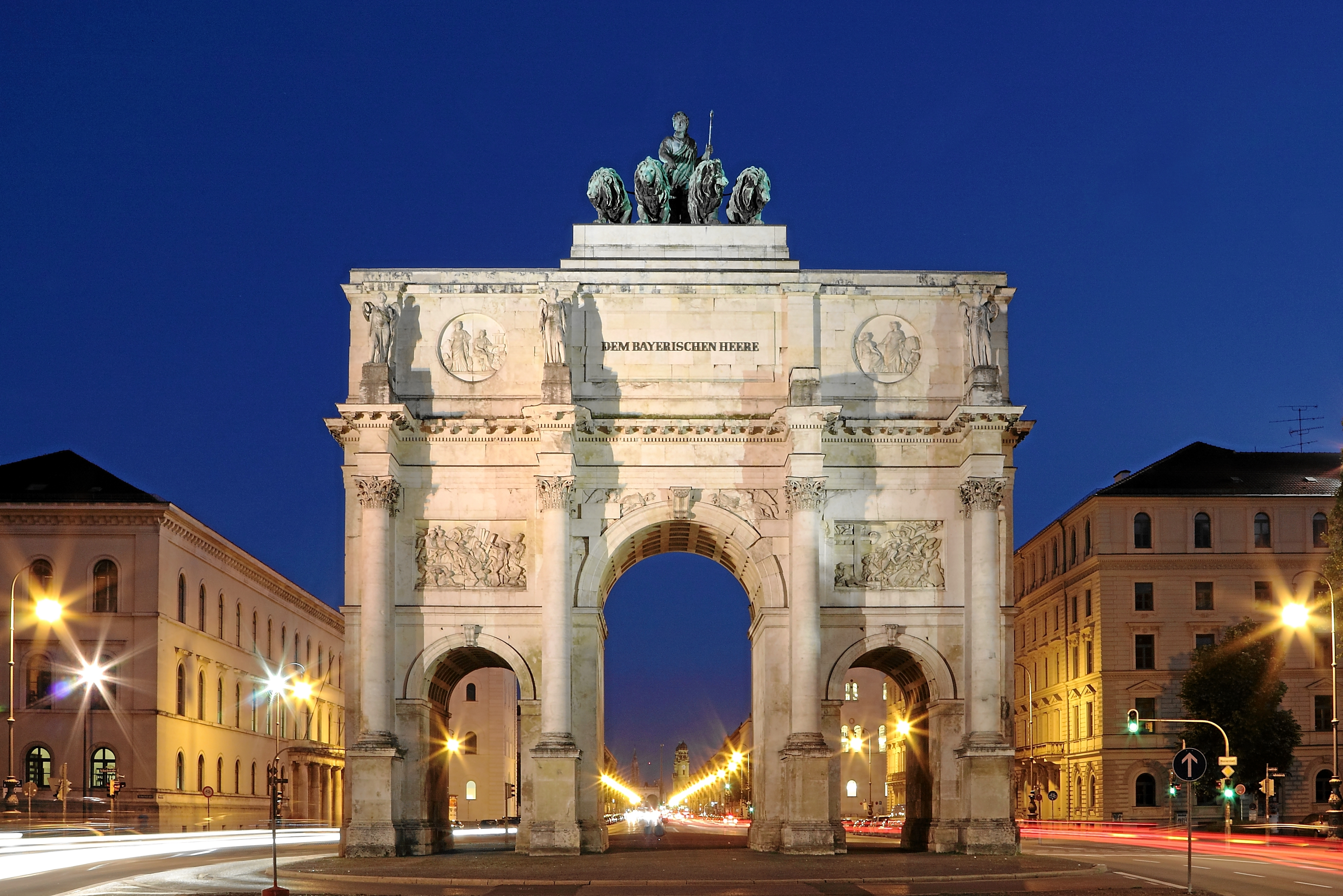
...and then teams traveled to Germany and ended at the Siegestor in Munich.

- Episode 3: "I'm In Russia Playing With Dolls" (March 14, 2006)
  & Episode 4: "It's Not Over Until the Phil Sings" (March 21, 2006)
- Prize: A trip to Africa (awarded to Eric and Jeremy)
- Eliminated: Wanda and Desiree

Locations

- Brotas (Fazenda Primavera da Serra)
- Brotas (Kilometer 114 Highway SP-225)
- Brotas (Terminal Rodoviário de Brotas) → São Paulo
- São Paulo → Moscow, Russia
- Moscow (Chaika Bassein)
- Moscow (Novodevichiy Monastery – Smolensky Cathedral)
- Moscow (8 Trolley Park or Dubrovka Theatre)
- Moscow (Saint Basil's Cathedral)
- Moscow → Frankfurt, Germany
- Frankfurt → Stuttgart
- Stuttgart (Mercedes-Benz Headquarters – Mercedes-Benz Werk Untertürkheim)
- Bad Tölz (Ellbach Field)
- Grünwald (Bavaria Film Studios)
- Munich (Siegestor)

Episode summary (Episode 3)

- At the start of this leg, teams had to drive to a marked entrance near kilometer 114 Highway SP-225, and then ride a 300-foot (91 m) zipline from the top of the hill before receiving their next clue. Teams were instructed to return to São Paulo on one of three buses departing forty-five minutes apart to São Paulo's Guarulhos International Airport, and then fly to Moscow, Russia.
- In this leg's first Roadblock, one team member had to put on a swimsuit, dive off a 10-metre (33 ft) diving platform into the pool below, and then swim to retrieve their next clue.
- After the first Roadblock, teams had to travel to the Novodevichiy Monastery and locate the Smolensky Cathedral to find their next clue.
- This leg's first Detour was a choice between Scrub or Scour. In Scrub, teams had to travel to a trolleybus depot and thoroughly wash a Russian public trolleybus inside and out to the satisfaction of the attendant in order to receive their next clue. In Scour, teams had to travel to the Dubrovka Theatre to search among 1,500 Russian nesting dolls to find one of ten with a microscopic clue hidden inside.
- After the first Detour, teams had to travel to Red Square and then search behind Saint Basil's Cathedral for Phil, who told them that the leg was not over before handing them their next clue.

Episode summary (Episode 4)

- Teams were instructed to fly to Frankfurt, Germany, and then travel by train to Stuttgart. Once there, teams had to travel to the flagship Mercedes-Benz headquarters, where they had to choose a car and driver who took them on a ride through a test course at the factory known as the Wall of Death. After riding the high-speed course, teams received their next clue, which directed them to drive to Ellbach Field to find their next clue.
- In this leg's second Roadblock, one team member had to search among 150 hats and feet scattered across a large field for one of eleven hidden Travelocity Roaming Gnomes, which had their next clue printed on its base.
- After the second Roadblock, teams had to drive to Grünwald and find their next clue at the gate of Bavaria Film Studios.
- This leg's second Detour was a choice between Break It or Slap It. In Break It, teams broke stunt bottles over each other's heads until they found Prost (the German word for cheers) written on the back of the label in order to receive their next clue. However, they could only smash one bottle per cuckoo from a traditional German cuckoo clock. In Slap It, teams had to correctly perform a traditional Schuhplattler dance in order to receive their next clue.
- After the second Detour, teams had to drive to Munich and check in at the Pit Stop: the Siegestor.

Additional notes

- The prize was given to the first team who brought a Travelocity gnome to the Pit Stop. Eric and Jeremy won the prize.
- Leg 3 was a double leg that was aired over two episodes.

=== Leg 4 (Germany → Italy) ===
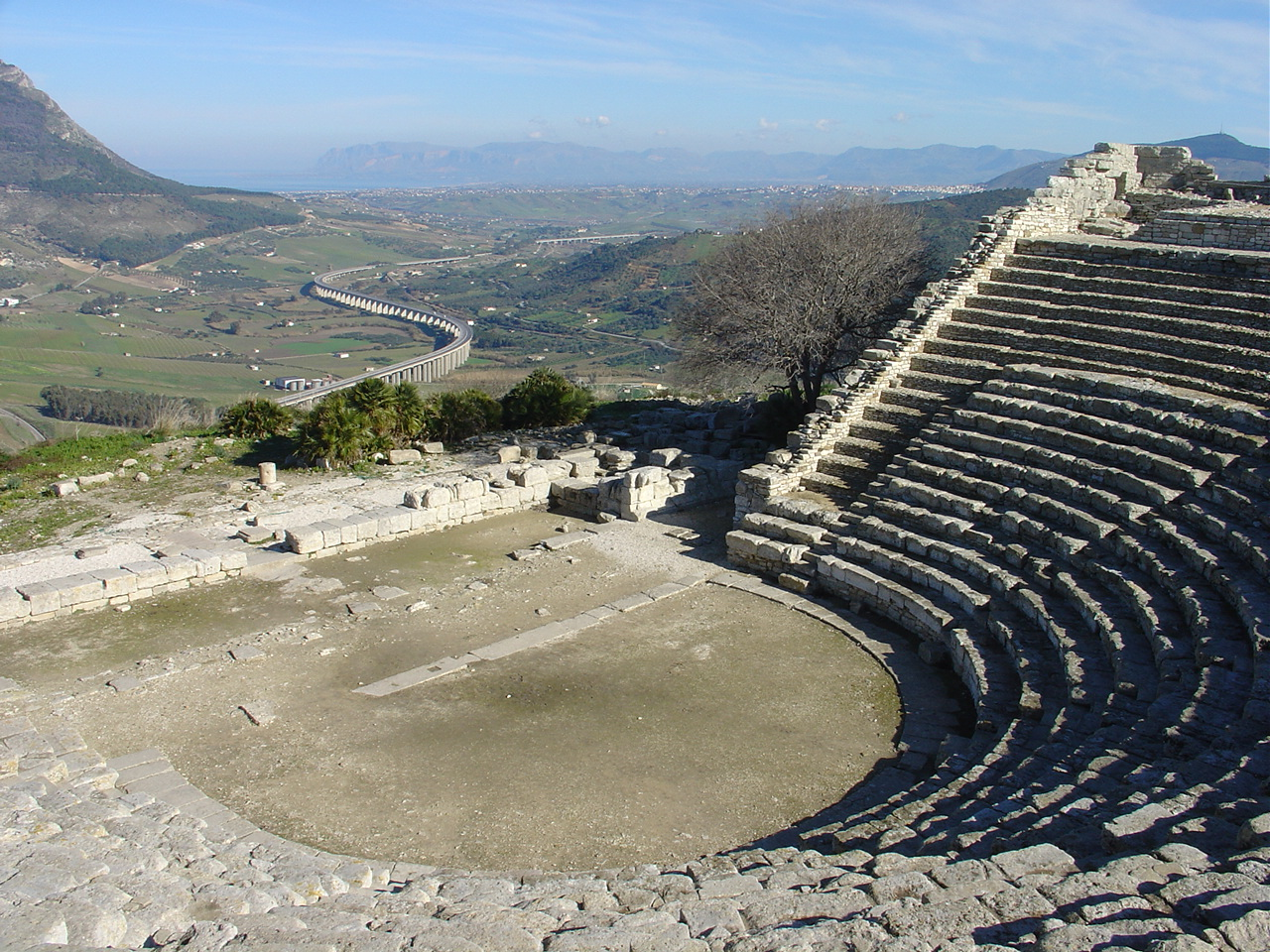
The Segesta Amphitheatre on the island of Sicily was the site of this leg's Roadblock.

- Episode 5: "Good Thing I Took That Human Anatomy Class in High School" (March 28, 2006)
- Prize: Digital imaging package (awarded to BJ and Tyler)
- Eliminated: Danielle and Dani

Locations

- Munich (Siegestor)
- Munich → Palermo, Italy
- Palermo (Teatro Massimo)
- Castellammare del Golfo (Seaside Terrace)
- Castellammare del Golfo (Premiata Fonderia Birrione Campane & Via Don Leonardo Zangara or Corso Giuseppe Garibaldi)
- Calatafimi-Segesta (Amphitheater)
- Calatafimi-Segesta (Tempio di Segesta)

Episode summary

- At the start of this leg, teams were instructed to fly to Palermo on the Italian island of Sicily. Once there, teams had to travel to the Teatro Massimo, where they had to search the grounds for their next clue. Teams were then instructed to travel to Castellammare del Golfo and find their next clue at the Seaside Terrace overlooking the Castello Normanno Lighthouse.
- This leg's Detour was a choice between Foundry or Laundry. In Foundry, teams had to walk to a nearby foundry to pick up a 110-pound (50 kg) iron-cast bell. Teams then had to load the bell onto an Ape, drive to Via Don Leonardo Zangara, and deliver the bell to a priest at Chiesa Maria SS. Del Soccorso in order to receive their next clue. In Laundry, teams had to search through over 2,400 pieces of laundry for one of sixteen pieces of clothing bearing a red and yellow tag, which they could exchange for their next clue.
- After the Detour, teams had to drive to Calatafimi-Segesta and find their next clue at the amphitheater.
- In this leg's Roadblock, one team member had to correctly piece together a classical Greek statue in order to receive their next clue.
- After the Roadblock, teams had to travel on foot to the nearby Tempio di Segesta to check in at the Pit Stop.

Additional note

- Lake and Michelle chose to Yield Danielle and Dani.

=== Leg 5 (Italy) ===
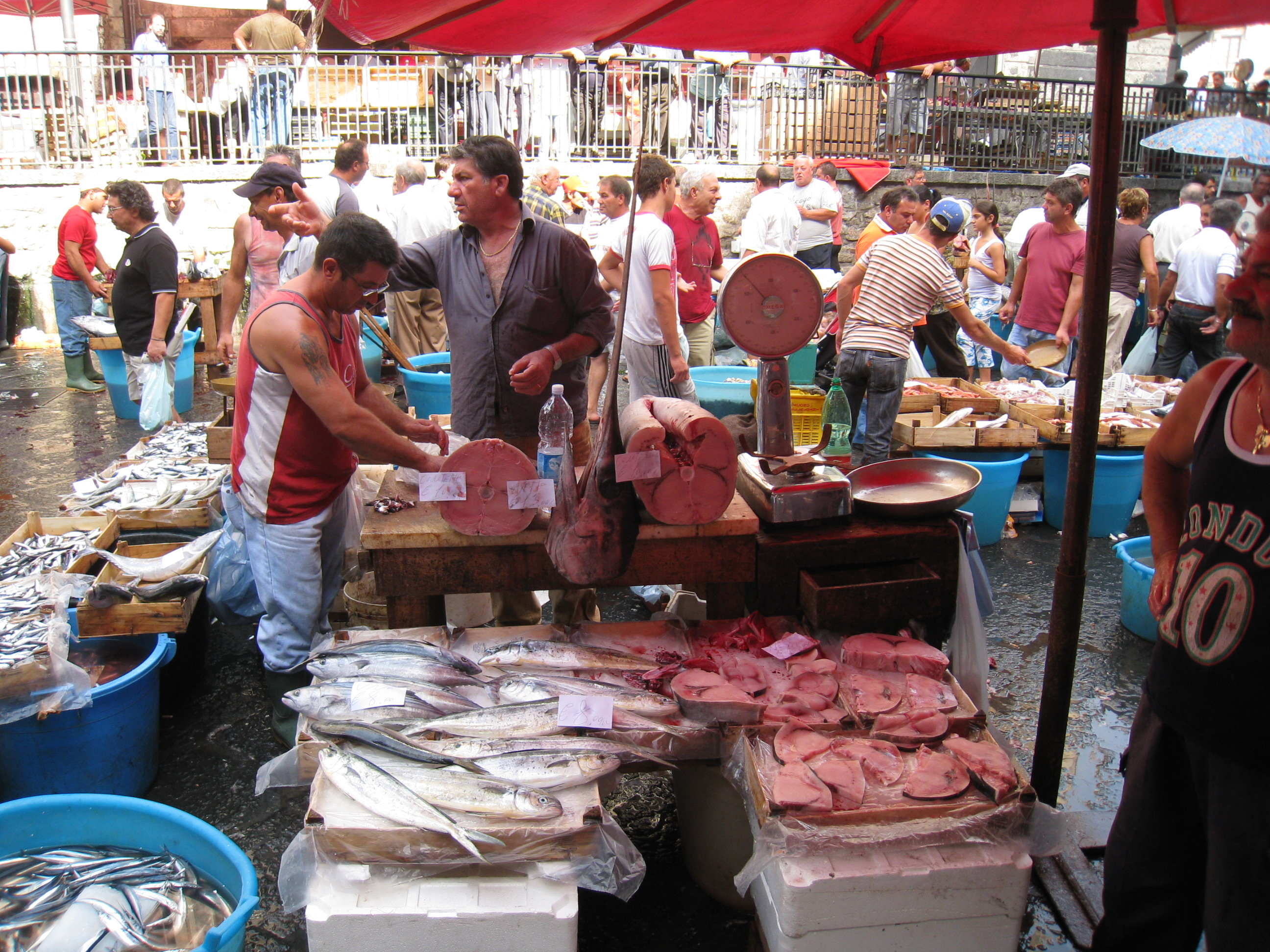
While in Catania, teams immersed themselves in a South Italian fish market.

- Episode 6: "Sleep Deprivation Is Really Starting to Irritate Me" (April 5, 2006)
- Prize: Cruise for two to Mexico (awarded to Eric and Jeremy)
- Eliminated: Dave and Lori

Locations

- Calatafimi-Segesta (Tempio di Segesta)
- Catania (Anfiteatro Romano)
- Catania (Il Mercato Storico la Pescheria)
- Syracuse (Ponte Umbertino)
- Syracuse (Fonte Aretusa)

Episode summary

- At the start of this leg, teams had to drive to the Anfiteatro Romano in Catania and search within the ruins of the amphitheater for their next clue, which instructed them to count the statue heads on the fence posts surrounding the grounds. Once teams counted the heads, they had to find the groundskeeper and give him the correct number in order to receive their next clue.
- This leg's Detour was a choice between Big Fish or Little Fish. In Big Fish, teams had to travel on foot to a street vendor in Via Alessi, pick up a 30-pound swordfish, and then carry it another 1/3 mile (0.54 km) to Il Mercato Storico la Pescheria. At the market, teams had to find the fish vendor and exchange their swordfish for their next clue. In Little Fish, teams had to travel on foot to the same fish market and sell 4 kilograms (8.8 lb) of a small fish known as triglia in order to receive their next clue.
- After the Detour, teams had to drive to the Ponte Umbertino in Syracuse to find their next clue.
- In this leg's Roadblock, one team member had to participate in kayak polo. They had to join a professional team and participate in an ongoing match. When racers scored one goal, they could receive their next clue directing them to the Pit Stop: the Fonte Aretusa in Syracuse.

=== Leg 6 (Italy → Greece) ===
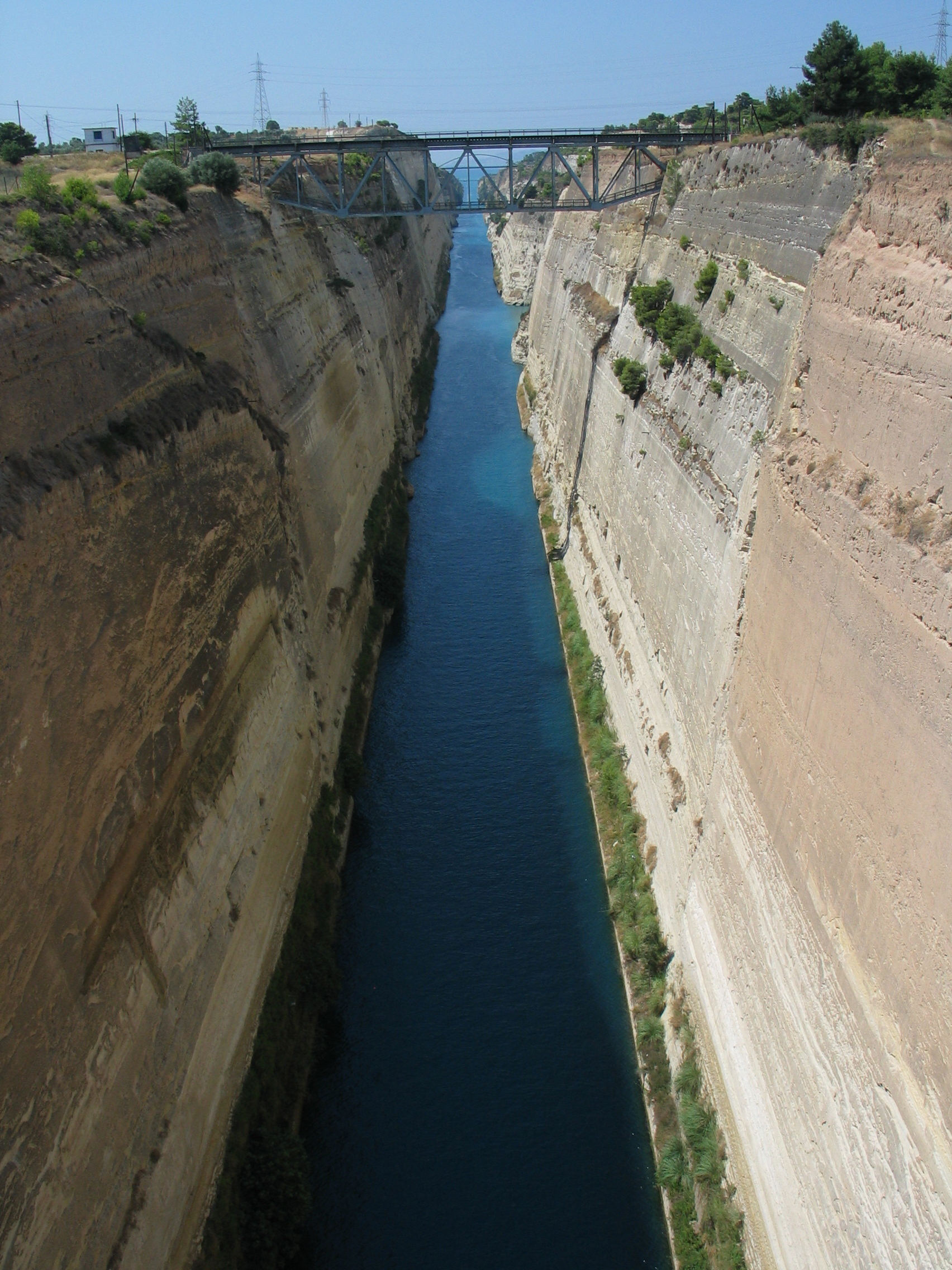
For the Roadblock in Corinth, one team member had to complete a 240 ft (73 m) bungee jump off a bridge over the Corinth Canal.

- Episode 7: "Herculean Effort for Some Herculean Dudes" (April 12, 2006)
- Prize: A trip to the premiere of The Da Vinci Code in Hollywood, California (awarded to Eric and Jeremy)
- Eliminated: Lake and Michelle

Locations

- Syracuse (Fonte Aretusa)
- Syracuse → Rome
- Rome (Trevi Fountain)
- Rome (Spanish Steps)
- Rome → Athens, Greece
- Athens (Ancient Agora)
- Athens (Plaka – Stamatopoulos Taverna)
- Athens → Corinth (Isthmos Railway Station)
- Corinth (Corinth Canal)
- Nemea (Ancient Stadium)
- Rio (Fortress of Rio)

Episode summary

- At the start of this leg, teams were instructed to travel by train to Rome. Once there, teams had to travel to the Trevi Fountain and find a man with a yellow and red scooter, who gave them their next clue and one half of Leonardo da Vinci's drawing of the Vitruvian Man. Teams were then instructed to travel to the Spanish Steps and find carriages with black leather portfolios containing the other half of the Vitruvian Man and their next clue, which instructed them to fly to Athens, Greece, and then travel to the Ancient Agora to find their next clue.
- This season's first Fast Forward required one team to travel on foot to Stamatopoulos Taverna in Athens and smash plates. Teams had to find a route marker flag baked into only one out of hundreds of plates. Eric and Jeremy won the Fast Forward.
- Teams who chose to not attempt the Fast Forward had to travel by train from Athens and disembark at the Isthmos railway station in Corinth in order to find their next clue.
- In this leg's Roadblock, one team member had to bungee jump 240 feet (73 m) into the Corinth Canal in order to receive their next clue.
- For this Ancient Greek-inspired Detour, teams drove to the Ancient Stadium in Nemea and had to choose between either Herculean Effort or It's All Greek To Me. In Herculean Effort, teams had to complete three events from the Ancient Olympic Games. One team member had to throw the discus, the other team member had to do the javelin throw, and both team members had to participate in Greco-Roman wrestling and push an opponent out of a 20-foot (6.1 m) circle in order to receive their next clue. In It's All Greek To Me, teams entered an archaeological site and searched for nine pieces of pottery containing Greek letters. Teams then had to translate the letters from Greek to English and unscramble them to spell out a location on a Greek map – Dimitsana (Δημητσανα) – in order to receive their next clue.
- After the Detour, teams had to check in at the Pit Stop: the Fortress of Rio, overlooking the Rio–Antirrio Bridge, in Rio.

Additional notes

- The bungee jump into the Corinth Canal was later revisited on season 29 as a Switchback.
- In the spirit of The Da Vinci Code, teams had to figure out how to arrange the two parchments of the Vitruvian Man in order to reveal a message. The first team to bring the solution to the Pit Stop would win the prize. Eric and Jeremy, who were the first to arrive at the Pit Stop, were able to put the message together and were awarded the prize.

=== Leg 7 (Greece → Oman) ===
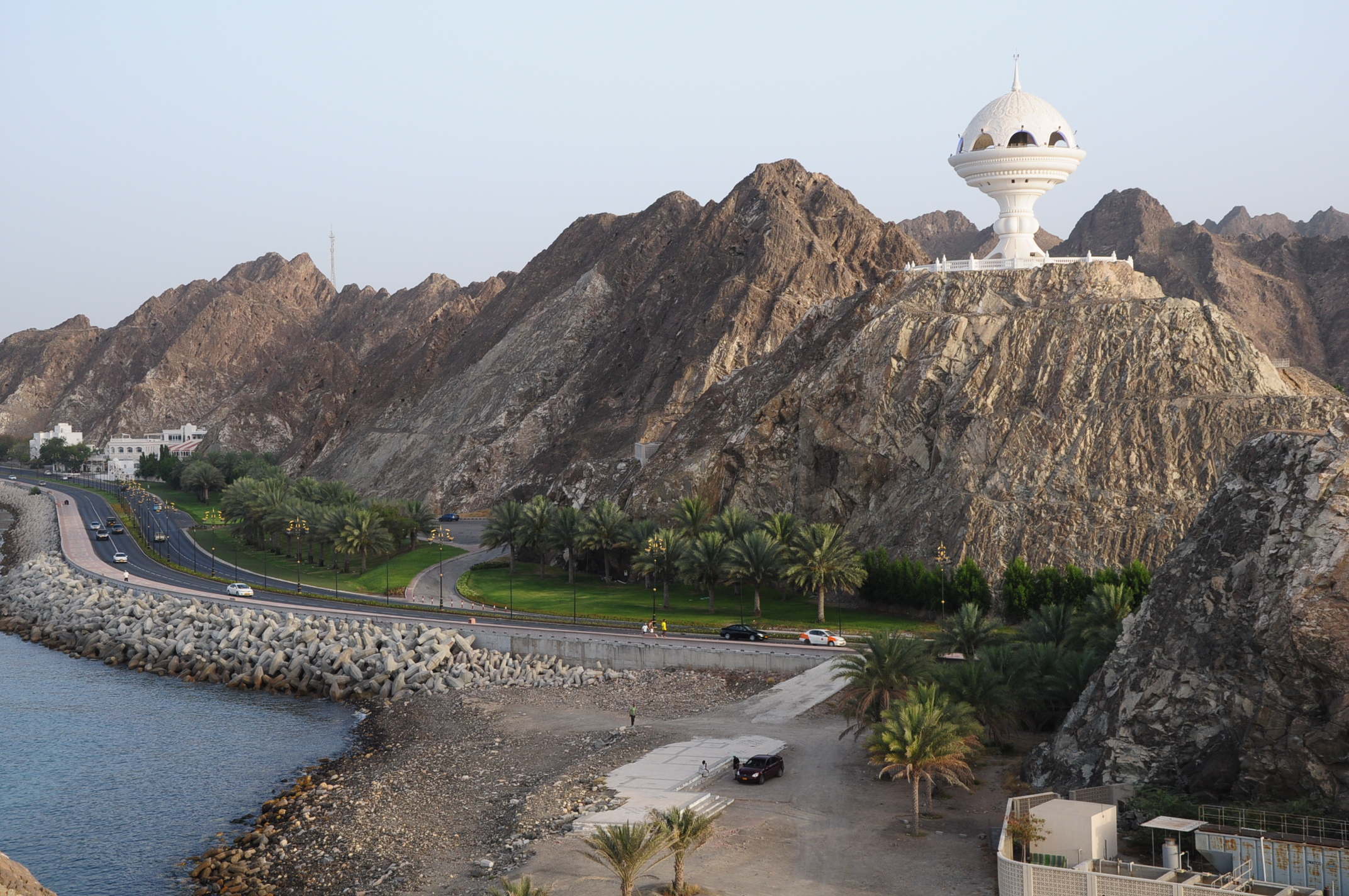
After arriving in Muscat, teams visited Riyam Park for a clue.

- Episode 8: "Here Comes the Bedouin" (April 19, 2006)
- Prize: A trip to Rome, Italy (awarded to Fran and Barry)

Locations

- Rio (Fortress of Rio)
- Antirrio (Antirrio Visitor Center) → Athens
- Athens → Muscat, Oman
- Muscat (Riyam Park)
- Sur (Baith Al Battha)
- Al Hawiyah (Shuwa Area)
- Jabrin (Jabreen Castle)

Episode summary

- At the start of this leg, teams were instructed to fly to Muscat, Oman. Teams first had to sign up for one of two charter buses departing an hour apart that took them to the Athens International Airport, where they then flew to Muscat. Once there, teams had to go to Riyam Park and find a giant incense burner in order to find their next clue. Teams then had to drive to Baith Al Battha in order to find their next clue.
- This leg's Detour was a choice between Camel or Watchtower. In Camel, teams had to travel by ferry across a creek, where they had to lift a camel into a truck using a winch. They then had to use a map to drive one mile (1.6 km) to a Bedouin camp and deliver the camel in order to receive their next clue. In Watchtower, teams had to cross the river and search three watchtowers for an Arabian message box scroll, although not every watchtower had a scroll. After they found it, they had to travel one mile (1.6 km) to Al-Sayegh Gold and Silversmith and exchange their scroll for their next clue.
- After the Detour, teams had to drive to the shuwa area in Al Hawiyah in order to find their next clue.
- In this leg's Roadblock, one team member had to dig into 117 sand dunes until they found one of six Omani underground ovens with a shuwa, a woven pouch with a meal of lamb wrapped in a dried palm leaf bag and steamed in the oven, in order to receive their next clue, which directed them to the Pit Stop: Jabreen Castle in Jabrin.

Additional note

- This was a non-elimination leg.

=== Leg 8 (Oman → Australia) ===
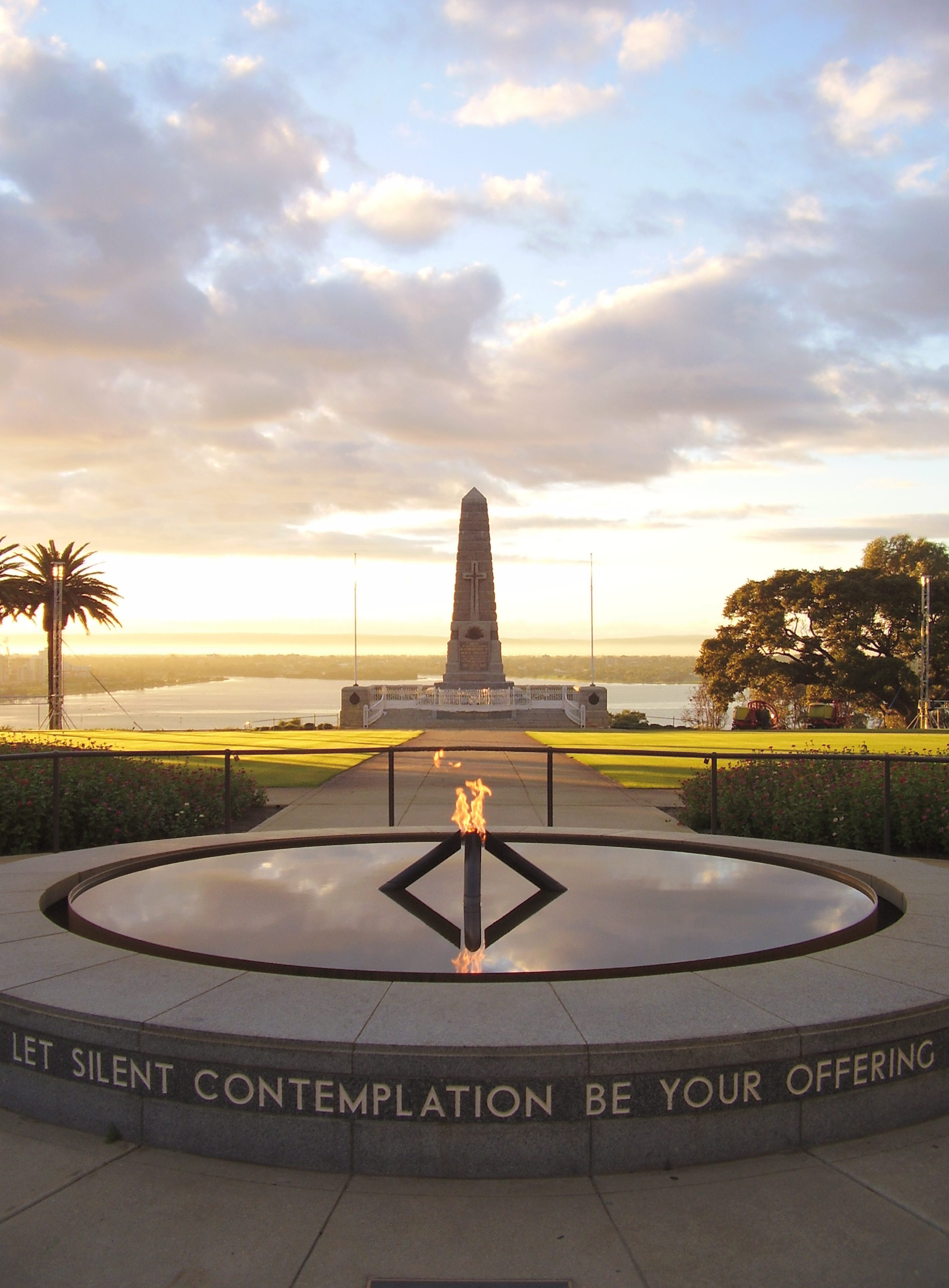
After arriving in Perth, teams traveled to Kings Park to find their next clue.

- Episode 9: "Do You Know How Much Running I Did Today, Phil?" (April 26, 2006)
- Prize: A trip to Hong Kong (awarded to Eric and Jeremy)
- Eliminated: Fran and Barry

Locations

- Jabrin (Jabreen Castle)
- Muscat → Perth, Australia
- Perth (Kings Park – State War Memorial)
- Fremantle → Rottnest Island
- Rottnest Island (Wadjemup Lighthouse)
- Rottnest Island (Salmon Bay)
- Rottnest Island → Fremantle or Perth
- Fremantle (Fremantle Prison)
- Fremantle (Fremantle Sailing Club – South Breakwater)

Episode summary

- At the start of this leg, teams were instructed to fly to Perth, Australia. Once there, teams had to travel to Kings Park and search for the State War Memorial in order to find their next clue. Teams were instructed to travel by ferry to Rottnest Island. Once there, teams had to pick up a tandem bicycle from a bike shop and pedal three miles (4.8 km) to Wadjemup Lighthouse in order to find their next clue.
- This leg's Detour was a choice between Sand or Sea. In Sand, teams had to drag 40 branches 126 yards (115 m) to a sand dune, an activity known as "brushing the beach", which helps to prevent beach erosion, in order to receive their next clue. In Sea, teams had to dive into the waves and search among 50 underwater crayfish traps on the ocean floor for those with live Western rock lobsters. Each team member had to retrieve one lobster and deliver it to a fisherman in order to receive their next clue.
- After the Detour, teams had to pedal back to the bike shop, travel by ferry back to the mainland, and then travel to Fremantle Prison to find their next clue.
- In this leg's Roadblock, one team member had to search Division No. 4 of Fremantle Prison for one of several cells that contained a flashlight. They then had to search for an entrance to a darkened cavern, descend underground, and use the flashlight to search for a set of either wet or dry tunnels for their next clue directing them to the Pit Stop: the South Breakwater at the Fremantle Sailing Club.

=== Leg 9 (Australia) ===
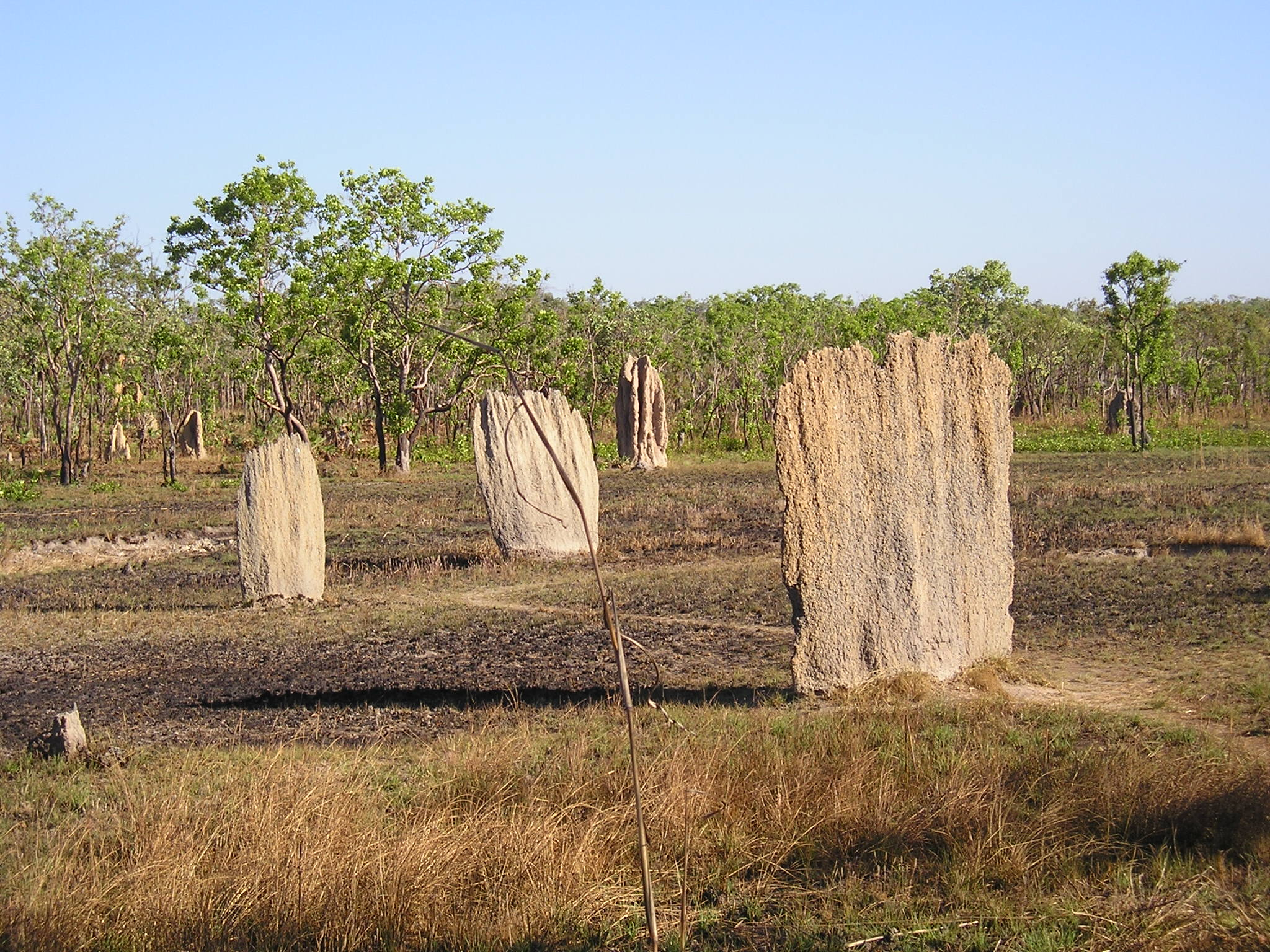
At the magnetic termite mounds of Litchfield National Park, teams found the clue for this leg's Detour.

- Episode 10: "Man, They Should Have Used Their Fake Names" (May 3, 2006)
- Prize: Two one-year leases for Mercedes ML350s (awarded to Ray and Yolanda)

Locations

- Fremantle (Fremantle Sailing Club – South Breakwater)
- Perth (City Centre – Swan Bells Tower)
- Perth → Darwin
- Darwin (Berrimah – Crocodylus Park)
- Batchelor (Batchelor Airfield – Darwin Parachute Club)
- Litchfield National Park (Magnetic Termite Mounds)
- Litchfield National Park (Buley Rockhole or The Lost City)
- Lake Bennett (Lake Bennett Wilderness Resort)

Episode summary

- At the start of this leg, teams had to drive to Perth and climb to the top of the Swan Bells Tower in order to find their next clue. Teams were then instructed to fly to Darwin. Once there, teams drove to Crocodylus Park, where they had to wade into a pond full of crocodiles to retrieve their next clue directing them to the Batchelor Airfield.
- In this leg's Roadblock, one team member had choose an airplane, climb to an altitude of 12,000 feet (3,700 m), and then perform a tandem skydive with an instructor. Once on the ground, they received their next clue.
- After the Roadblock, teams had to drive to the Litchfield National Park and search for their next clue among the magnetic termite mounds.
- This leg's Detour was a choice between Wet or Dry. In Wet, teams had to drive six miles (9.7 km) to a swimming hole called Buley Rockhole, and then hike and swim one mile (1.6 km) down a river infested with spiders and poisonous plants o retrieve their next clue. In Dry, teams had to drive six miles (9.7 km) on-road, and then another six miles (9.7 km) off-road, to a rock formation known as The Lost City. Once there, teams had to select a didgeridoo and follow the sound of music in order to locate a nearby Aboriginal musician with a matching didgeridoo, who taught each team member to play a note so they could receive their next clue.
- After the Detour, teams had to check in at the Pit Stop: the Lake Bennett Wilderness Resort.

Additional notes

- BJ & Tyler chose to Yield Joseph and Monica.
- This was a non-elimination leg.

=== Leg 10 (Australia → Thailand) ===
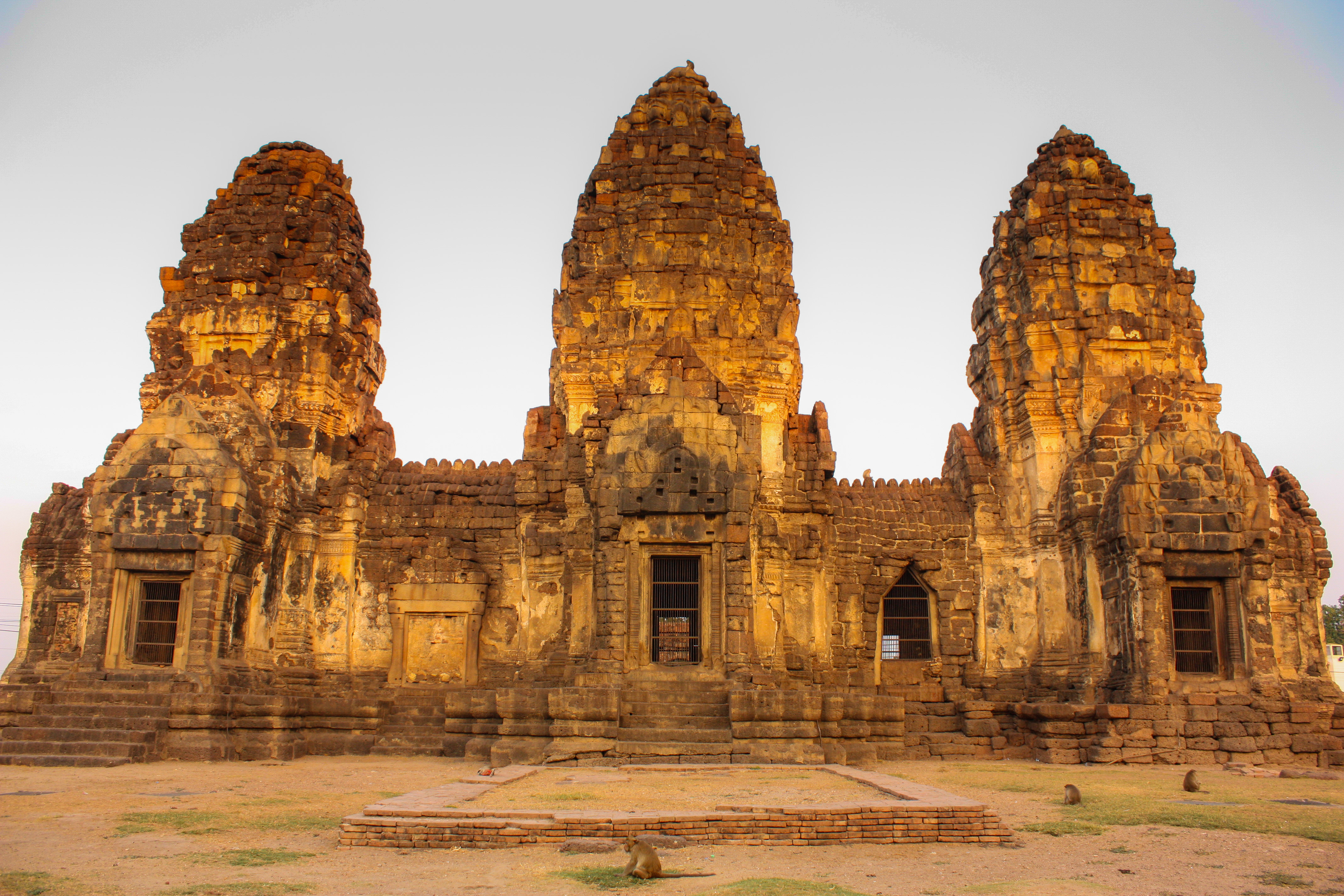
After arriving in Lopburi, teams visited the historic Prang Sam Yot, where they found the Roadblock.

- Episode 11: "I Think This Monkey Likes Me" (May 10, 2006)
- Prize: A cruise around Sydney Harbour with visits to the Hunter Valley wine district and the Great Barrier Reef, and a stay at a luxury hotel while at the Pit Stop (awarded to Ray and Yolanda)
- Eliminated: Joseph and Monica

Locations

- Lake Bennett (Lake Bennett Wilderness Resort)
- Darwin → Bangkok, Thailand
- Bangkok → Lopburi
- Lopburi (Prang Sam Yot)
- Pho Kao Ton (Bo Ngoen Pla Pao Restaurant)
- Pak Kret → Ko Kret Island
- Ko Kret Island (Buddha Garden)
- Ko Kret Island (Jom Jam Pottery Factory or Wat Chimphli)
- Bangkok (Marble Temple)

Episode summary

- At the start of this leg, teams were instructed to fly to Bangkok, Thailand. Once there, teams had to travel by bus to Lopburi and find their next clue at Prang Sam Yot.
- In this leg's Roadblock, one team member had to recreate a properly arranged ceremonial feast of fruit and give it to the monkeys at Prang Sam Yot in order to receive their next clue.
- This season's second Fast Forward required teams to travel to a restaurant and eat a bowl of fried crickets and grasshoppers. BJ and Tyler won the Fast Forward.
- After the Roadblock, teams were instructed to travel by ferry to Ko Kret Island and find their next clue at the Buddha Garden.
- This leg's Detour was a choice between Move It or Altar It. In Move It, teams had to go to the Jom Jam Pottery Factory and then transport a total of 72 clay pots on wooden boards balanced on their shoulders through the streets of a market to a boat in order to receive their next clue. In Altar It, teams had to go to the Wat Chimphli temple, where they had to properly assemble a shrine and then apply gold leaf to a statue of Buddha in order to receive their next clue.
- After the Detour, teams had to check in at the Pit Stop: the Marble Temple in Bangkok.

Additional note

- The clue at Prang Sam Yot contained an additional envelope inside that informed teams to not open it until they reached the Pit Stop. The prize on this leg was awarded to the team who had a picture of a golden gnome in their envelope. Ray and Yolanda won the prize.

=== Leg 11 (Thailand → Japan) ===
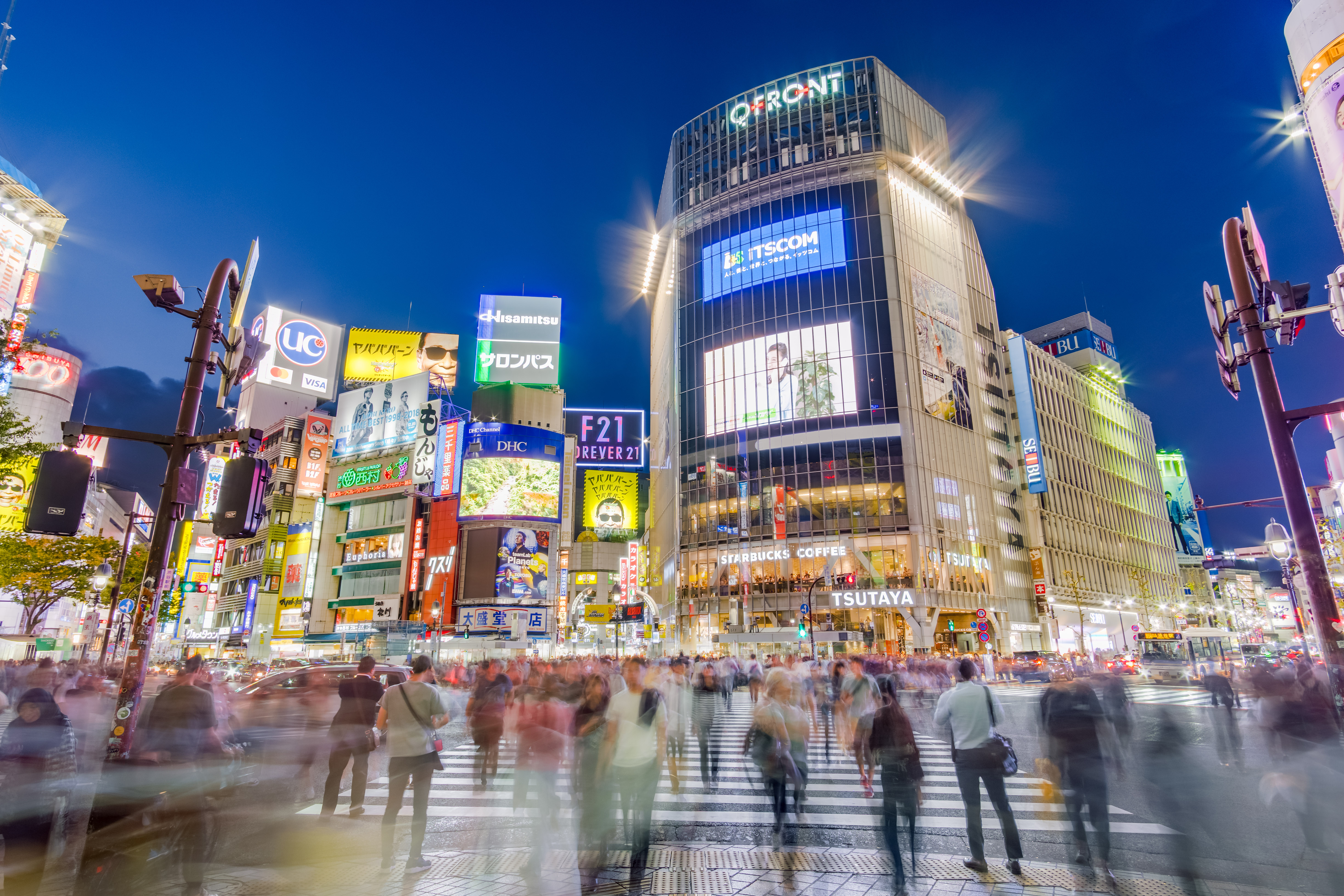
The Shibuya Scramble Crossing in Tokyo and its various display screens were featured on this leg.

- Episode 12: "5 Continents, 9 Countries, More Than 59,000 Miles" (May 17, 2006)
- Prize: Two T-Mobile Sidekicks with three years of free service (awarded to BJ and Tyler)

Locations

- Bangkok (Marble Temple)
- Phra Nakhon Si Ayutthaya (Royal Elephant Kraal)
- Bangkok → Tokyo, Japan
- Tokyo (Narita International Airport) → Narita (Hotel Nikko Narita)
- Tokyo (Shibuya Scramble Crossing)
- Tokyo (Hachikō Statue)
- Tokyo (Hama-rikyū Gardens or Sankusu Street)
- Tokyo (Capsule Land Hotel)
- Fujiyoshida (Fujikyu Highland)
- Yamanakako (Lake Yamanaka – The Big Swan)

Episode summary

- At the start of this leg, teams traveled to the Royal Elephant Kraal, where they received smartphones from the elephants that displayed their next clue instructing them to fly to Tokyo, Japan. Once there, teams had to travel to the parking lot of the Hotel Nikko Narita, search for a marked vehicle, and then drive to the Sakamoto Building in Shibuya. They had to walk to a scramble crossing and scan the big flashing screens in order to find their next clue: Find Hachiko! They had to figure out that they had to find a statue of the namesake dog, where they found a man wearing a red and yellow scarf with their next clue.
- This leg's Detour was a choice between Maiden or Messenger. In Maiden, teams had to travel to Hama-rikyū Gardens and carry a traditional Japanese palanquin with a young Japanese woman 1/3 mile (540 m) to a tea ceremony pavilion in order to receive their next clue. In Messenger, teams had to travel 200 yards (180 m) to a parking lot and pick up a pair of folding bicycles as well as messenger bags, which each contained a parcel. Teams then had to assemble the bikes and ride through the streets of Tokyo to deliver the packages to Shinjuku Park Tower and Shinjuku Chuo Koen in Shinjuku. When they were done, teams returned to the bike parking lot to receive their next clue.
- After the Detour, teams had to travel to the Capsule Land Hotel, where they received one of three departure times fifteen minutes apart the next day based on the order they arrived. The next morning, teams were directed to drive to Fujikyu Highland in Fujiyoshida in order to find their next clue.
- In this leg's Roadblock, one team member had to ride on three extreme rides in the following order: The Pizza, Dodonpa, and Fujiyama. While riding, they had to spot a man holding a message somewhere along one of the rides. After the third ride, they had to relay the message to the park manager in order to receive their next clue. If they could not, they had to go on all three rides again.
- After the Roadblock, teams had to drive to Lake Yamanaka and pedal a swan boat to the Pit Stop: The Big Swan.

Additional note

- This was a non-elimination leg.

=== Leg 12 (Japan → United States) ===
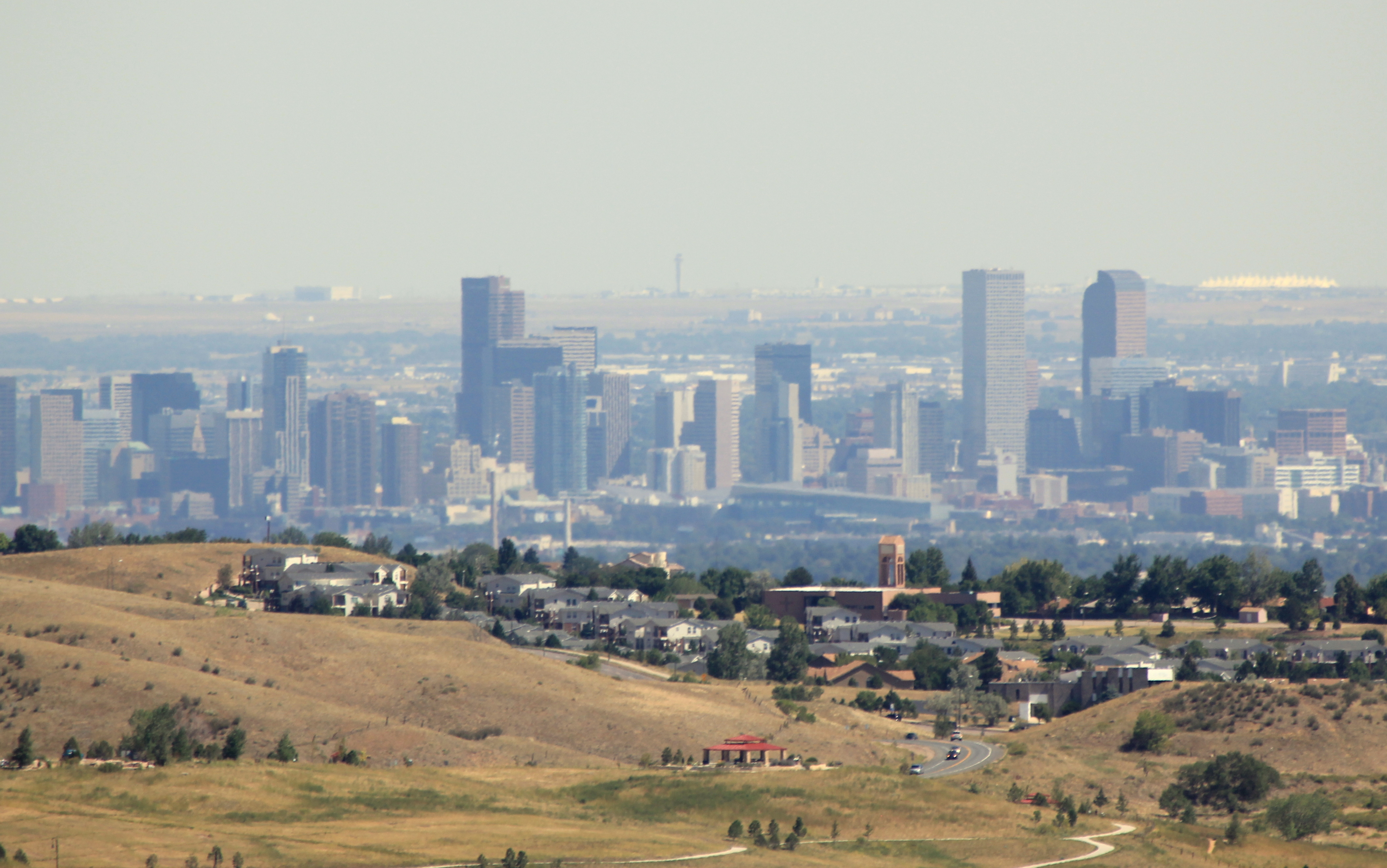
Denver's skyline as seen from the Red Rocks Amphitheatre, the starting and finish lines of The Amazing Race 9.

- Episode 12: "5 Continents, 9 Countries, More Than 59,000 Miles" (May 17, 2006)
- Prize: US$1,000,000
- Winners: BJ and Tyler
- Runners-up: Eric and Jeremy
- Third place: Ray and Yolanda

Locations

- Yamanakako (Lake Yamanaka – The Big Swan)
- Narita (Hotel Nikko Narita) → Tokyo (Narita International Airport)
- Tokyo → Anchorage, Alaska (Ted Stevens Anchorage International Airport)
- Anchorage (Mirror Lake)
- Anchorage (Kincaid Park)
- Anchorage → Denver, Colorado
- Golden (Clear Creek History Park)
- Morrison (Red Rocks Park – Red Rocks Amphitheatre)

Episode summary

- At the start of this leg, teams were instructed to fly to Anchorage, Alaska. Once there, teams had to search the airport for a marked car with their next clue, which directed them to drive to Mirror Lake.
- This season's final Detour was a choice between Drill It or Deliver It. In Drill It, teams had to use an ice auger to drill 10 holes in the ice, push an ice fishing shack to the holes, and properly position the shack over at least two of the holes in order to receive their next clue. In Deliver It, teams would have had to load a bush plane with medical supplies, fly with a pilot over 75 miles (121 km) to Girdwood, deliver the supplies, receive their next clue, and then fly back. Due to poor weather conditions, this option was subject to an indefinite delay, so all teams performed Drill It.
- After the Detour, teams drove to Kincaid Park, where they had to search the park's chalet for snowshoes and then hike to their next clue. Teams were then instructed to fly to Denver, Colorado. Once there, teams traveled to Clear Creek History Park in Golden and searched the grounds for their next clue, which instructed teams to "go back to where you started", leaving them to figure out that their next destination was the starting line: Red Rocks Amphitheatre.
- In this season's final Roadblock, one team member had to search a field of 285 flags, find the nine flags representing each of the countries that they visited, and place them in chronological order. Teams had a reference board with the correct flags along with three decoy flags. Unlike normal Roadblocks, the non-participating team member could provide guidance, but could not physically assist. Once teams got the order of the flags correct, they could run to the nearby finish line.

Correct answers
Order	Flags
1	Brazil
2	Russia
3	Germany
4	Italy
5	Greece
6	Oman
7	Australia
8	Thailand
9	Japan

Additional note

- Legs 11 and 12 aired back-to-back as a special two-hour episode.

== Reception ==
=== Critical response ===
The Amazing Race 9 received mixed reviews. Linda Holmes from the television recap site Television Without Pity viewed this season negatively due to it being dominated by two "obnoxious" teams writing "Dear This Season: Boo." Andy Dehnart from the reality television news site Reality Blurred wrote that this season rebounded from the previous "lame" Family Edition. Heather Havrilesky of Salon wrote "all in all, this was a really lively, fun season of 'The Amazing Race,' the kind that strengthens my undying commitment to watch every second of every hour of every season of this show". In 2016, this season was ranked 21st out of the first 27 seasons by the Rob Has a Podcast Amazing Race correspondents. In 2021, Jane Andrews of Gossip Cop ranked this season as the show's 10th best season. In 2024, Rhenn Taguiam of Game Rant placed this season within the bottom 13 out of 36.

=== Awards ===
On August 27, 2006, season 9 won a Primetime Emmy Award for Outstanding Reality-Competition Program, the fourth consecutive award for the series.

== Works cited ==
- Castro, Adam-Troy (2006). My Ox Is Broken!. BenBella Books. ISBN 978-1-932100-91-4.
