= B. J. Averell =

American reality show contestant

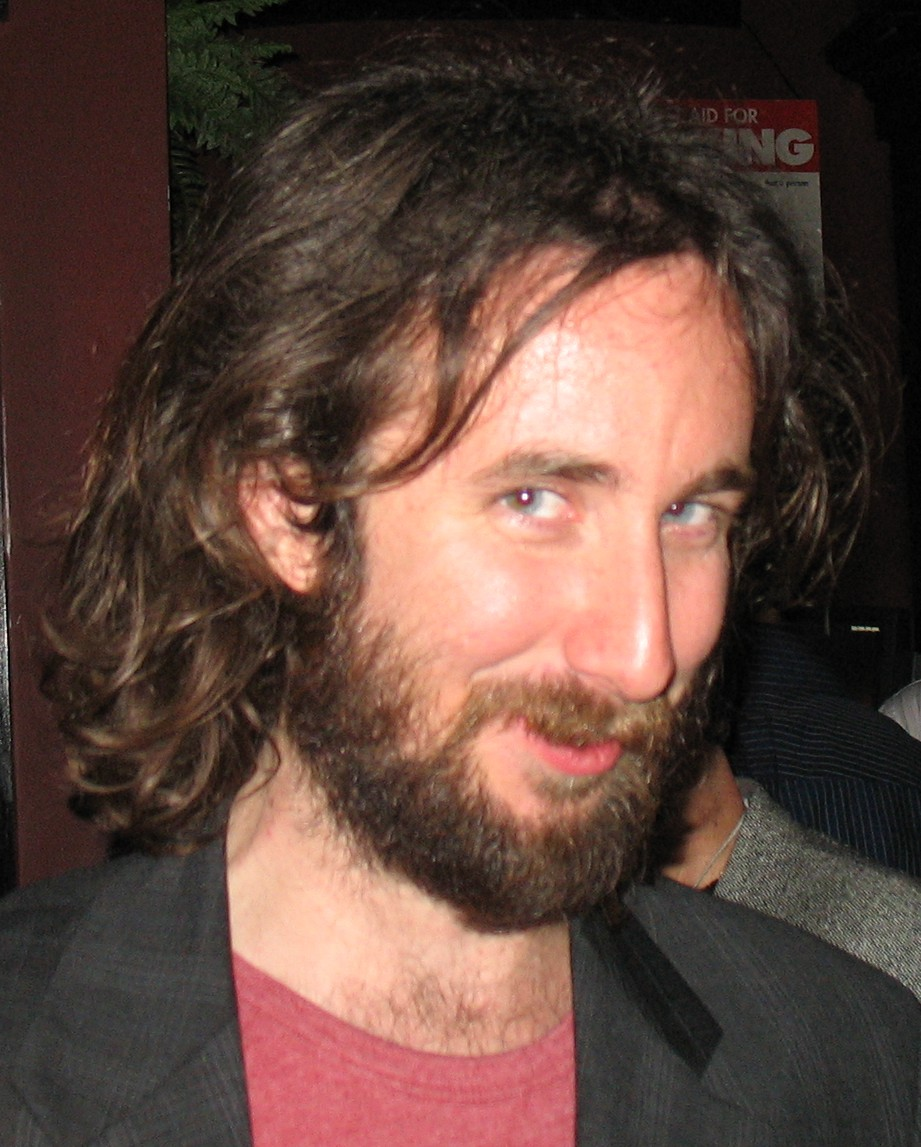
- Born: Brian Jeffrey Averell; Camden, New Jersey, U.S.
- Education: Harvard University, Collingswood High School
- Television: The Amazing Race 9 (Winner)

Brian Jeffrey Averell is an American actor and reality show contestant who won The Amazing Race 9 with teammate Tyler MacNiven. He is currently a CBS technology reporter and Periscope livestreamer broadcasting from major content conventions such as NAB.

== Early life and education ==
A native of Collingswood, New Jersey, Averell graduated from Collingswood High School in 1998, and attended Harvard University. In 2000, he ran for Undergraduate Council president. Considered a wildcard, Averell was twice cited with campaign violations before being forced to shut down his campaign.

At Harvard, Averell was a member of the Hasty Pudding Theatricals and the improv group On Thin Ice. He also wrote daily comic strip "The Neil World" for The Harvard Crimson. With fellow Harvard student B. J. Novak, he co-produced and hosted a variety show called The B.J. Show, which one year featured Bob Saget reprising his television roles in a few skits and ending the show with his own standup routine. He would eventually graduate with a degree in religion and move to Los Angeles to pursue a career in entertainment.

== Logan Airport incident ==
On November 24, 1999, Averell showed up late for a 6:15 p.m. flight from Logan International Airport in Boston to Philadelphia aboard a Delta Connection commuter flight, and was denied access to the small jet because his assigned seat had been given away. Averell slipped past the attendant at the gate, blended in with other passengers crossing the tarmac and proceeded to find refuge in a rest room and settled onto a toilet seat. "Once I got on, I figured maybe through some stroke of fate no one would have to use the bathroom," Averell said. He was given away by another passenger and arrested before the flight departed. He was charged with disorderly conduct and trespassing. He later told a news photographer he was surprised at how easy it was to stow away.

Averell pleaded not guilty, and two months later state prosecutors and Delta Air Lines agreed to drop all charges against him. According to Averell's lawyer, the decision came because the then student "was not belligerent to anyone".

== The Amazing Race ==
In 2006, Averell appeared as a contestant on the ninth edition of the American television series The Amazing Race. He and his teammate, Tyler MacNiven, whom Averell met during Semester at Sea four years earlier, beat out ten other teams to win the show's $1 million prize. B.J. & Tyler, as they were identified on the program, were nicknamed "the hippies" by the other teams.

B.J. & Tyler came in last in two legs of the season, both of which were non-elimination legs. Host Phil Keoghan said, "They enjoyed every single moment they were on this race, whether they were in first or in last. They kept their spirit all the way to the end." "If it's this successful to be hippies, we might as well stay hippies," Tyler said at the finish line in Denver, Colorado. B. J. added, "I think that on this Race, being cerebral or being intelligent doesn't help as much as being in the moment and just being aware of what's going on around you. And it's just great to stay positive and just really enjoy each other's company. And our friendship is what got us through it."

=== The Amazing Race 9 finishes ===
- An underlined blue placement with a double-dagger (‡) indicates that BJ and Tyler were the last to arrive at a pit stop in a non-elimination leg.
- A green ƒ indicates that BJ and Tyler won the Fast Forward.

Roadblocks performed by Averall are bolded

Episode	Leg	Destination(s)	Detour choice (underlined)	Roadblock performance	Placement	Notes
1	1	United States → Brazil	Motor head/Rotor head	No roadblock	2nd of 11	
2	2	Brazil	Press it/Climb it	**BJ**	1st of 10	
3	3	Brazil → Russia → Germany	Scrub/Scour	Tyler	4th of 9	(Note: Leg 3 was a double-length leg, with two Detours and two Roadblocks, shown over two episodes. The placement listed in the top row reflect the order teams arrived at the leg's halfway point.)
4	3	Brazil → Russia → Germany	Break it/Slap it	**BJ**	2nd of 9	(Note: Leg 3 was a double-length leg, with two Detours and two Roadblocks, shown over two episodes. The placement listed in the top row reflect the order teams arrived at the leg's halfway point.)
5	4	Germany → Italy	Foundry/Laundry	Tyler	1st of 8	
6	5	Italy	Big fish/Little fish	**BJ**	2nd of 7	
7	6	Italy → Greece	Herculean effort/It's all Greek to me	Tyler	5th of 6	(Note: BJ & Tyler initially arrived 5th, but were issued a 15-minute penalty for taking a bus instead of a train all the way to the Isthmos Train Station. This did not affect their placement.)
8	7	Greece → Oman	Camel/Watchtower	**BJ**	5th of 5‡	
9	8	Oman → Australia	Sand/Sea	Tyler	3rd of 5	
10	9	Australia	Dry/Wet	**BJ**	4th of 4‡	
11	10	Australia → Thailand	Used fast forward		1st of 4ƒ	
12	11	Thailand → Japan	Maiden/Messenger	Tyler	1st of 3	
12	12	Japan → United States	Drill it/Deliver it	**BJ**	1st of 3	

== Acting ==
- In 2005, B. J. played the part of an escaped criminal in the movie Saving Shiloh.
- Also in 2005, B. J. appeared in the 4th episode of CSI's 6th season. He played a member of a cult that committed suicide in the episode titled "Shooting Stars".
- In 2010, B. J. appeared as a beer vendor in the 9th episode of Weeds's 6th season, entitled "To Moscow, and Quickly".
- Introduced himself as Bingo on Control TV while crashing on Tristan Couvares's loft as a "couch surfer".
- In 2017, B. J. appeared as himself in a Pedestrian Question segment of Jimmy Kimmel Live!.
