= Kintaro Walks Japan =

- Directed by: Tyler MacNiven
- Produced by: Tyler MacNiven
- Starring: Tyler MacNiven
- Release date: 2005
- Country: United States
- Languages: English, Japanese

Kintaro Walks Japan is a documentary film produced and directed by Tyler MacNiven. It is an account of MacNiven's journey walking and backpacking the entire length of Japan from Kyūshū to Hokkaidō, more than 2000 miles in 145 days.

MacNiven cited three reasons for the journey. On his first trip to Japan in 2002, he fell in love with the country. It was on this trip that a friend nicknamed him "Kintaro," which means "Golden Boy," because of his blond hair. Occasionally accompanying him on the trip was his girlfriend, Ayumi, whose father, George Meegan, completed the longest unbroken walk in recorded history - a nearly 7-year sojourn from the southern tip of Argentina to the northern tip of Alaska. Inspired by their story, MacNiven conceived of the task after learning that his father, whose parents were foreign missionaries, was born in an unknown location in Hokkaidō. Armed with a desire to impress Ayumi and find his father's birthplace, as well as an interest in Japanese culture, MacNiven set sail to Japan.

With only a drawing of the birthplace to aid him, MacNiven walked the length of Japan with hope of finding his father's birthplace. Along the way, he befriended many Japanese people and learned much about their culture and himself. As well, his time spent in Japan helped him learn a fair amount of Japanese.

Although he completed his task in July 2004, it was not until the subsequent year that Kintaro Walks Japan was disseminated on the internet and gained popularity. Unable to find a distributor for the documentary of the trek, MacNiven burned 1,000 DVDs and began hawking copies of the film on the streets of San Francisco and at a restaurant his father owns. One day, George Strompolos, an executive from the nearby Google campus, dropped by. “Dad showed the movie to him,” MacNiven said. “He watched it and said, ‘This is exactly what we need.’" In 2006, roughly 500 people watch the filmed every day at Google Video. American Airlines also screened the film on international flights for a month.
