= Tyler MacNiven =

American filmmaker

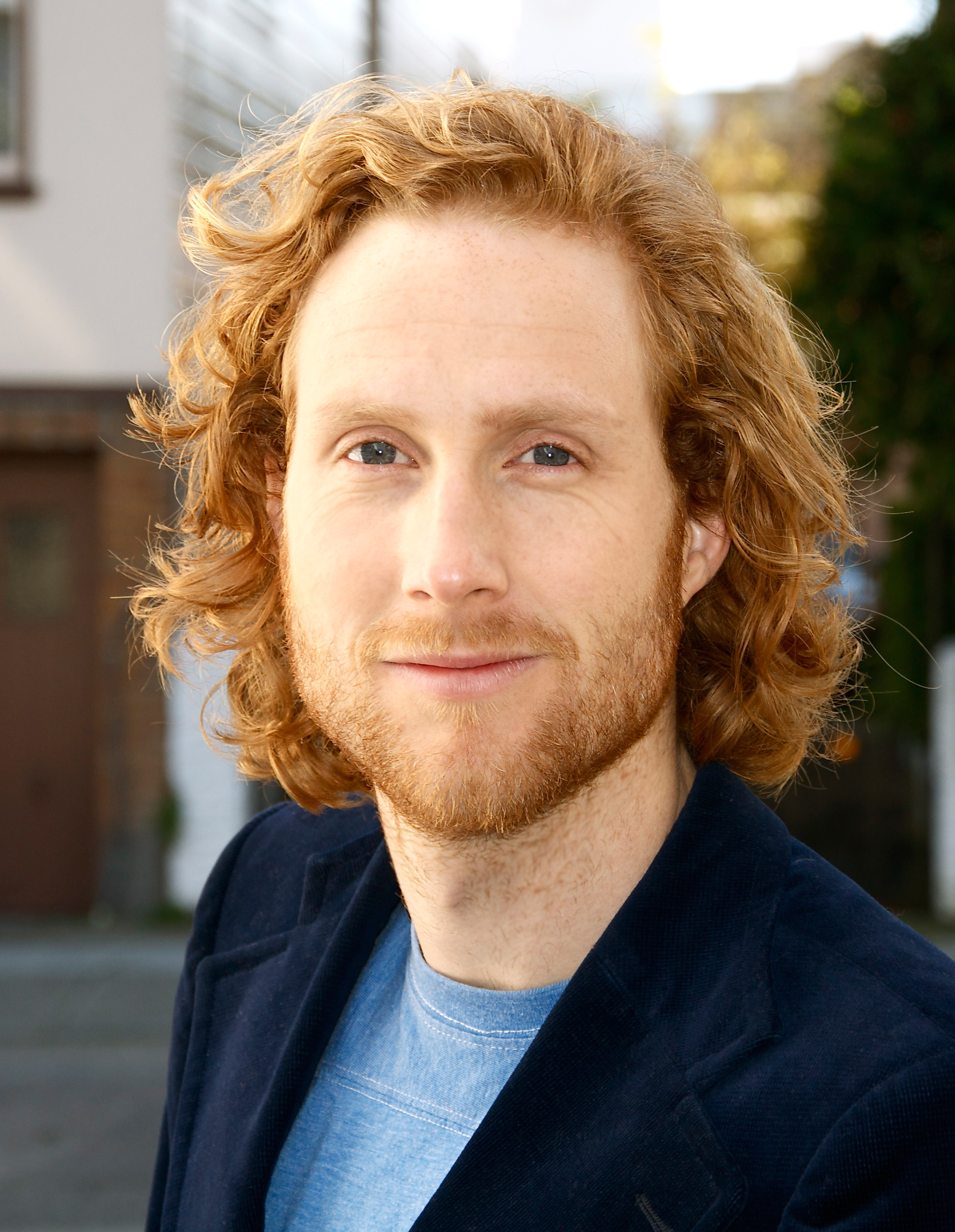
- Occupation: Filmmaker
- Television: The Amazing Race 9

Tyler Kingsley MacNiven is an American filmmaker and reality television contestant.

== Stanford University admission campaign ==
MacNiven first received attention in 1998 when, while a senior at the Woodside High School in Woodside, California, he launched a political-style campaign to supplement his application to Stanford University, where he had wanted to go since the seventh grade. After turning in his early admission application, MacNiven held a press conference in front of Stanford's Bowman Alumni House. For the rest of the week, MacNiven and his volunteer staff of friends and family wore sandwich boards and passed out "Tyler MacNiven for Stanford Student" leaflets after school, among other traditional campaign activities. MacNiven said, "There's so many outstanding people applying to Stanford these days that I actually want to be `out standing' in front of them, to show them that he really did have a passion to go there. MacNiven was rejected. He said, "My goal was to make every possible effort, leaving no options untested. That's what the campaign was really about." He was told by the admissions officer that he was noticed and that his campaign was not detrimental, despite seeming foolish to many citizens.

MacNiven graduated from UC Santa Cruz with a BA in politics, completing semesters abroad in Hungary and on a Semester at Sea, which has featured such great minds as Fidel Castro among others. He claims to have been the last student of Tom Lehrer.

== Kintaro Walks Japan ==
In 2004, MacNiven walked the length of Japan over 145 days. He created a one-hour documentary of the trek, titled Kintaro Walks Japan. MacNiven cited three reasons for the journey. On his first trip to the country in 2002, he fell in love with the country and had to return. It was on this trip that a friend nicknamed him the "Kintarō," which means "Golden Boy," because of his blond hair. MacNiven hoped to win a girl over, but he ultimately went home without doing so.

Unable to find a distributor for the documentary of the trek, MacNiven burned 1,000 DVDs and began hawking copies of the film on the streets of San Francisco and at a restaurant his father owns. One day, George Strompolos, an executive from the nearby Google campus, dropped by. "Dad showed the movie to him," MacNiven said. "He watched it and said, 'This is exactly what we need.'" Upon release, the film was averaging approximately 500 views a day at Google Video.

Kintaro Walks Japan premiered at the Santa Cruz Film Festival in 2006 and was voted by the audience as "Best of Fest" and it received the highest winning vote in the 5-year history of the festival.

== The Amazing Race ==
In 2006, MacNiven appeared as a contestant on the ninth edition of the American television series The Amazing Race. He and his teammate, B.J. Averell, who MacNiven met on the study abroad program Semester at Sea four years earlier, beat out ten other teams to win the show's $1 million prize over Eric & Jeremy. BJ & Tyler, as they were identified on the program, were nicknamed "the hippies" by the other teams.

BJ & Tyler came in last in two legs of the season, but both the legs were non-elimination legs. Host Phil Keoghan said, "They enjoyed every single moment they were on this race, whether they were in first or in last. They kept their spirit all the way to the end." "If it's this successful to be hippies, we might as well stay hippies," Tyler said at the finish line in Colorado. He also added, "BJ and I approached each country with wide eyes and enthusiasm and joy and a huge spirit of adventure and willing to share that with everybody we met. There's so much in this world. We might as well just take advantage of as much as we can and give back as much as we can and that's important. 'Cause that's how it all works."

=== The Amazing Race 9 finishes ===
- An underlined blue placement with a double-dagger (‡) indicates that BJ and Tyler were the last to arrive at a pit stop in a non-elimination leg.
- A green ƒ indicates that BJ and Tyler won the Fast Forward.

Roadblocks performed by MacNiven are bolded

Episode	Leg	Destination(s)	Detour choice (underlined)	Roadblock performance	Placement	Notes
1	1	United States → Brazil	Motor head/Rotor head	No roadblock	2nd of 11	
2	2	Brazil	Press it/Climb it	BJ	1st of 10	
3	3	Brazil → Russia → Germany	Scrub/Scour	**Tyler**	4th of 9	(Note: Leg 3 was a double-length leg, with two Detours and two Roadblocks, shown over two episodes. The placement listed in the top row reflect the order teams arrived at the leg's halfway point.)
4	3	Brazil → Russia → Germany	Break it/Slap it	BJ	2nd of 9	(Note: Leg 3 was a double-length leg, with two Detours and two Roadblocks, shown over two episodes. The placement listed in the top row reflect the order teams arrived at the leg's halfway point.)
5	4	Germany → Italy	Foundry/Laundry	**Tyler**	1st of 8	
6	5	Italy	Big fish/Little fish	BJ	2nd of 7	
7	6	Italy → Greece	Herculean effort/It's all Greek to me	**Tyler**	5th of 6	(Note: BJ & Tyler initially arrived 5th, but were issued a 15-minute penalty for taking a bus instead of a train all the way to the Isthmos Train Station. This did not affect their placement.)
8	7	Greece → Oman	Camel/Watchtower	BJ	5th of 5‡	
9	8	Oman → Australia	Sand/Sea	**Tyler**	3rd of 5	
10	9	Australia	Dry/Wet	BJ	4th of 4‡	
11	10	Australia → Thailand	Used fast forward		1st of 4ƒ	
12	11	Thailand → Japan	Maiden/Messenger	**Tyler**	1st of 3	
12	12	Japan → United States	Drill it/Deliver it	BJ	1st of 3	
