= Crocodylus Park =

- Interactive map of Crocodylus Park
- 12.412132°S 130.928075°E
- Date opened: 1994
- Location: Knuckey Lagoon, Northern Territory, Australia
- Land area: 20 hectares
- No. of species: 40+
- Owner: Wildlife Management International
- Website: www.crocodyluspark.com.au

Crocodylus Park is a zoo situated in Knuckey Lagoon, Northern Territory, Australia. It specialises in the conservation of saltwater and freshwater crocodiles and features a comprehensive crocodile museum. The park also has big cats, monkeys, birds, turtles and snakes.

Crocodilians

- American alligator
- Freshwater crocodile
- New Guinea crocodile
- Philippine crocodile
- Saltwater crocodile

Other animal species

- African lion (white-coated)
- Agile wallaby
- Antilopine kangaroo
- Asian water buffalo
- Australian jabiru
- Banteng
- Black-handed spider monkey
- Black-headed python
- Blood python
- Blue peafowl
- Boa constrictor
- Brown capuchin
- Burmese python
- Bush stone-curlew
- Capybara
- Common marmoset
- Corn snake
- Cotton-top tamarin
- Dingo
- Double-wattled cassowary
- Elongated tortoise
- Emu
- Green anaconda
- Green iguana
- Hamadryas baboon
- Indian star tortoise
- Leopard tortoise
- Magpie goose
- Major Mitchell's cockatoo
- Malayan box turtle
- Maned wolf
- Meerkat
- Ostrich
- Red-handed tamarin
- Red kangaroo
- Reticulated python
- Rhinoceros iguana
- Serval
- Timor pony
- Common wombat
- Rhinoceros iguana
- Brushtail possum
- Pig
- Goat
- Pink cockatoo
- Chameleon
- Blue-and-yellow macaw
- Guinea fowl
- Sulphur-crested cockatoo
- Binturong
Crocodylus Park, September 2025

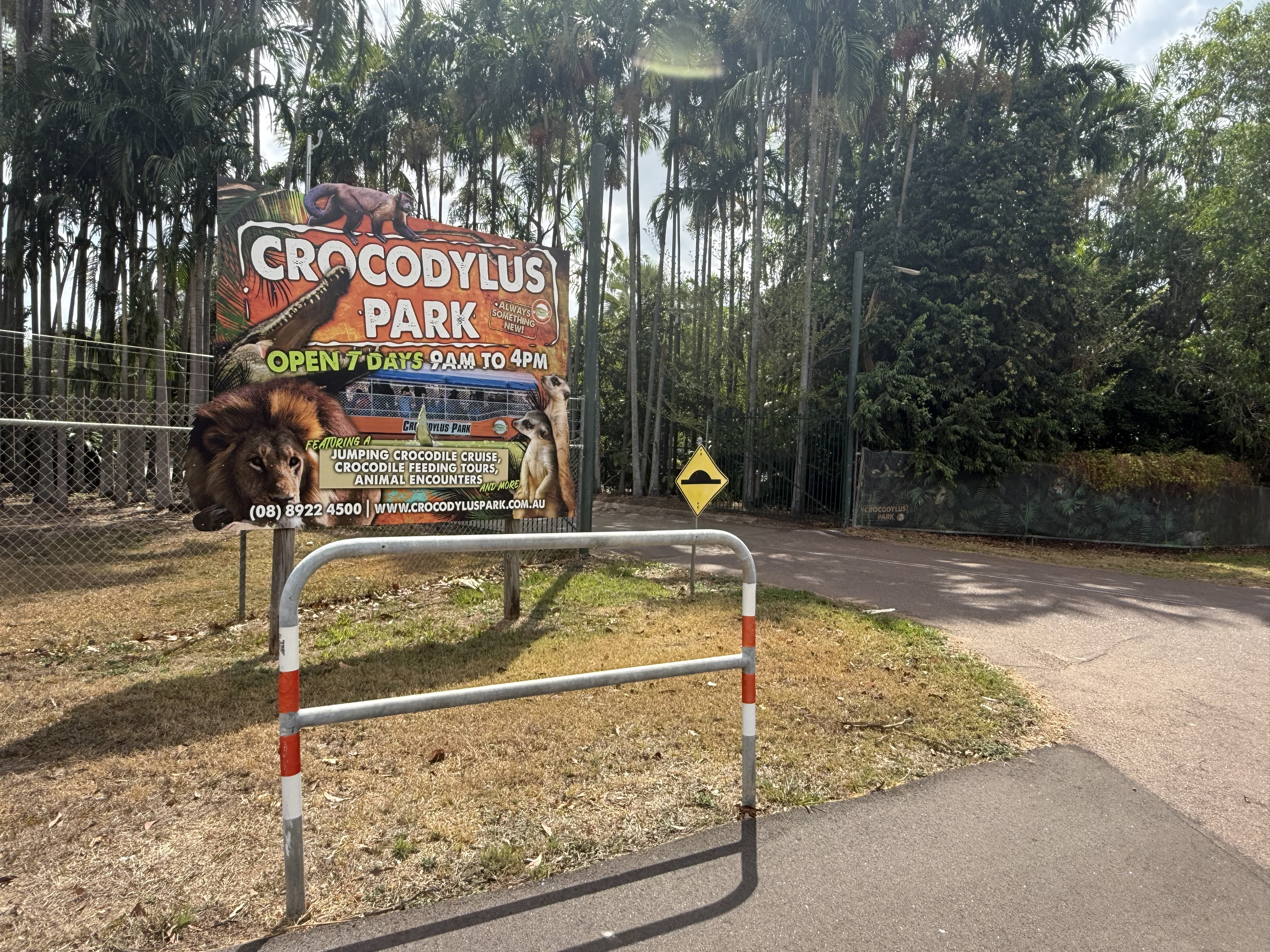
Entry sign

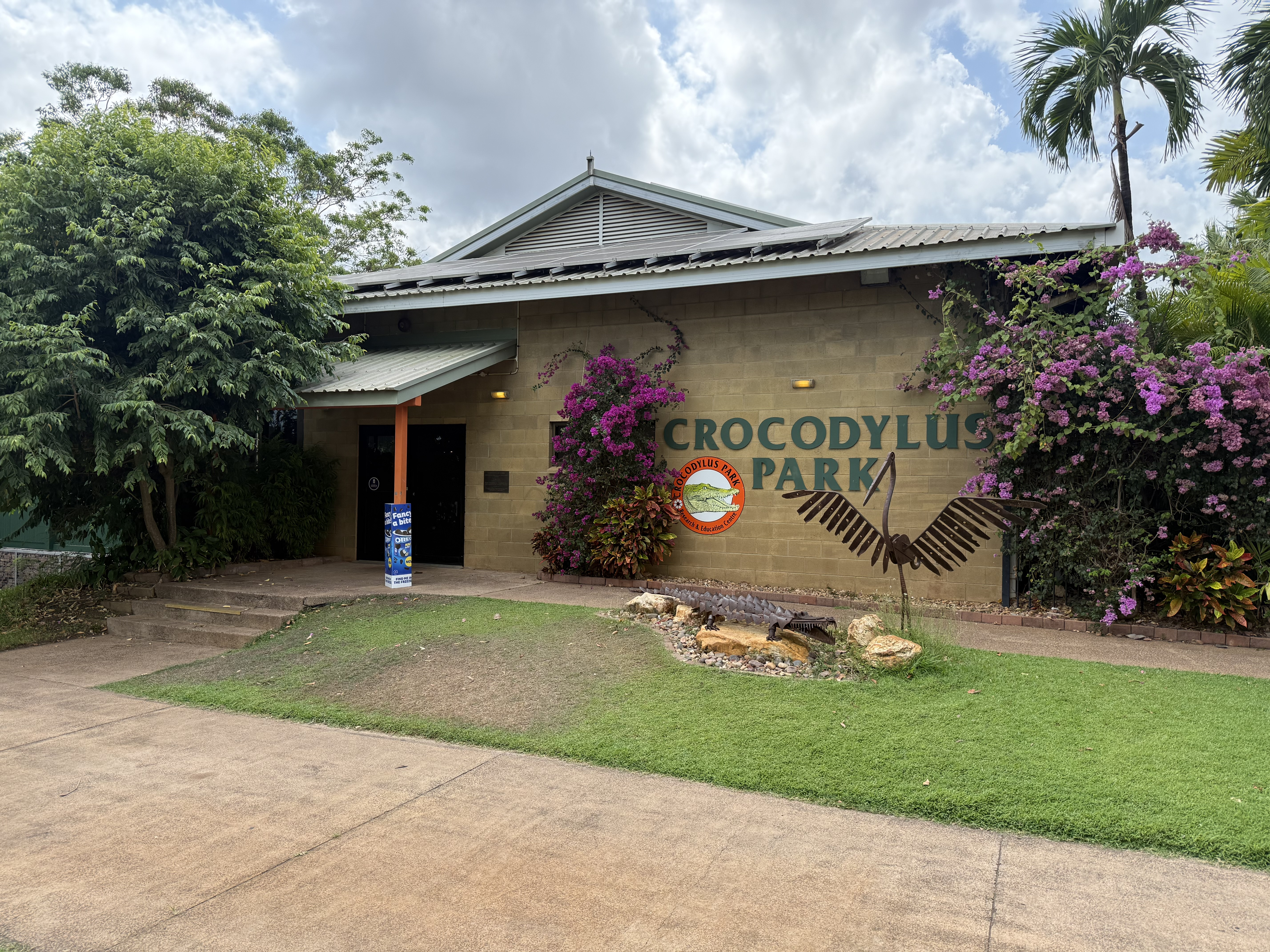
Reception entrance

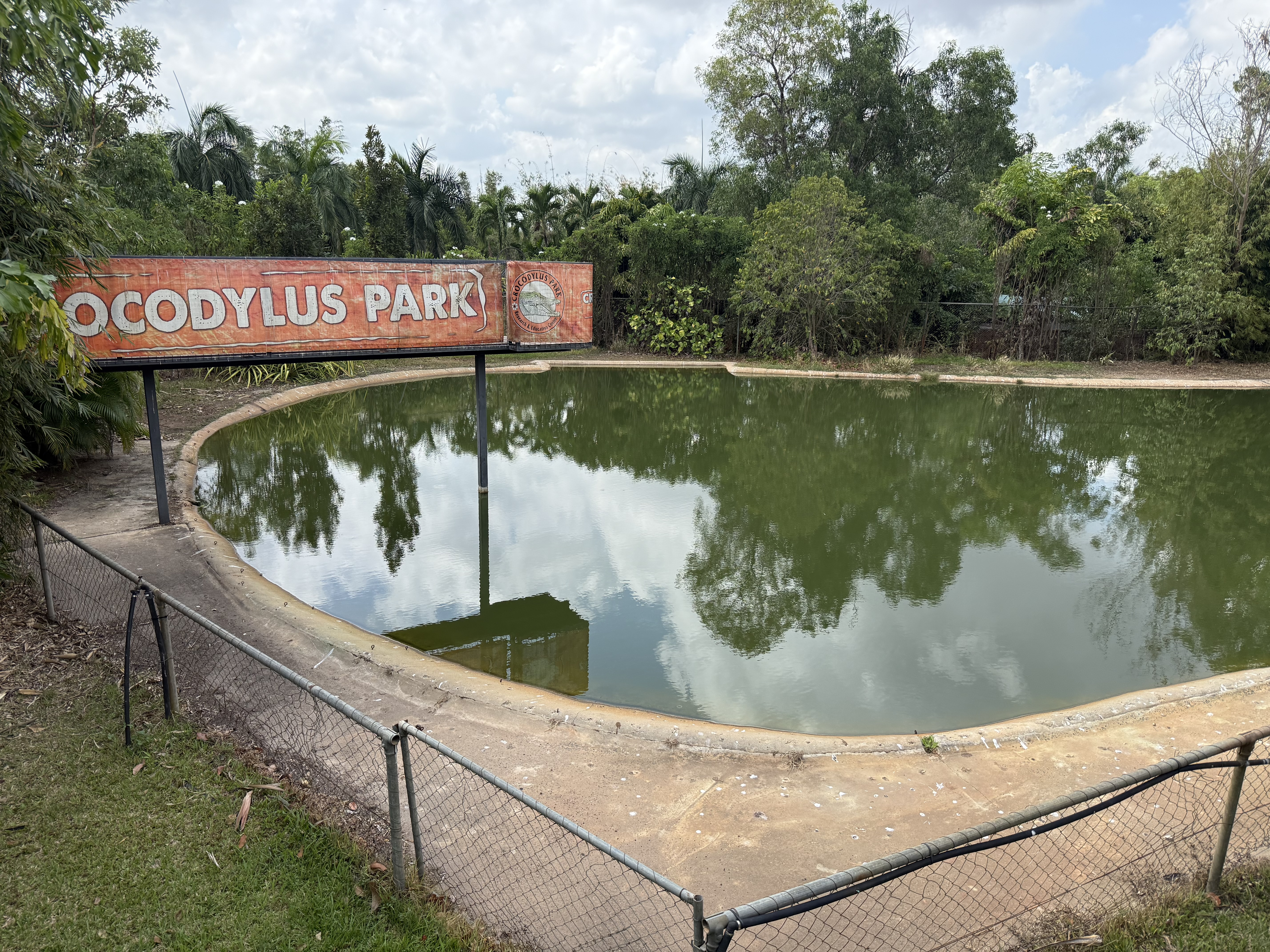
Main lagoon
