= Lake Bennett (Northern Territory) =

- Location within Northern Territory
- Location: Lake Bennett, Northern Territory
- Coordinates: 12°57′36″S 131°09′57″E
- Lake type: reservoir
- Basin countries: Australia
- Surface area: 4.45 km^{2} (1.72 sq mi)
- Islands: 1

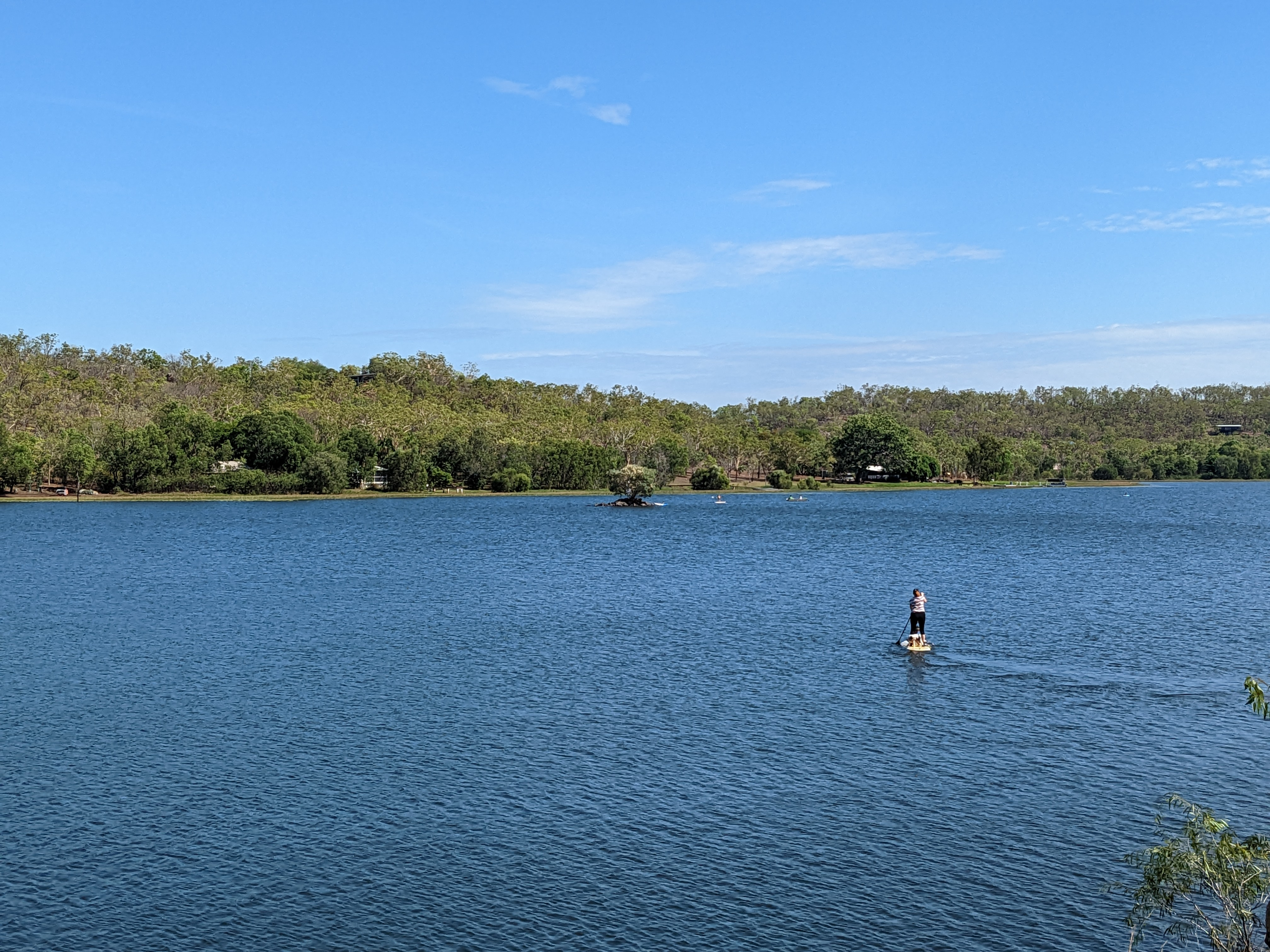
Stand-up paddle-boarding on Lake Bennett

Lake Bennett is a small artificial freshwater lake located 80 km south of Darwin, Northern Territory, Australia within the Coomalie Shire. The lake is set in 4.45 square kilometres of tropical wilderness. It was created in 1980 following the construction of a dam by George and Ken Bennett on a property they had purchased the previous year.

It has been stocked with barramundi since 2004. In recent times some sub-division of the lands around the lake foreshores has occurred with cabins and houses being built around the northern edge, although the permanent population is very small. These dwellings are largely used as "weekenders" or retreats.

== Resort ==
Lake Bennett Wilderness resort was developed in the 1990s. The resort offers a variety of accommodation options as well as canoe hire, restaurant and bar. The resort was awarded a Northern Territory Tourism Brolga Award in 2002 in the category "unique accommodation". In 2011, a development application was approved for a large expansion of the resort, including both tourist and residential accommodation, however these plans did not eventuate. After closing in 2018, the resort was sold to new owners, renovated and rebranded. It reopened in 2021 as the De Lago Resort at Lake Bennett.
