= Middle Point, Northern Territory =

Middle Point
- Suburb
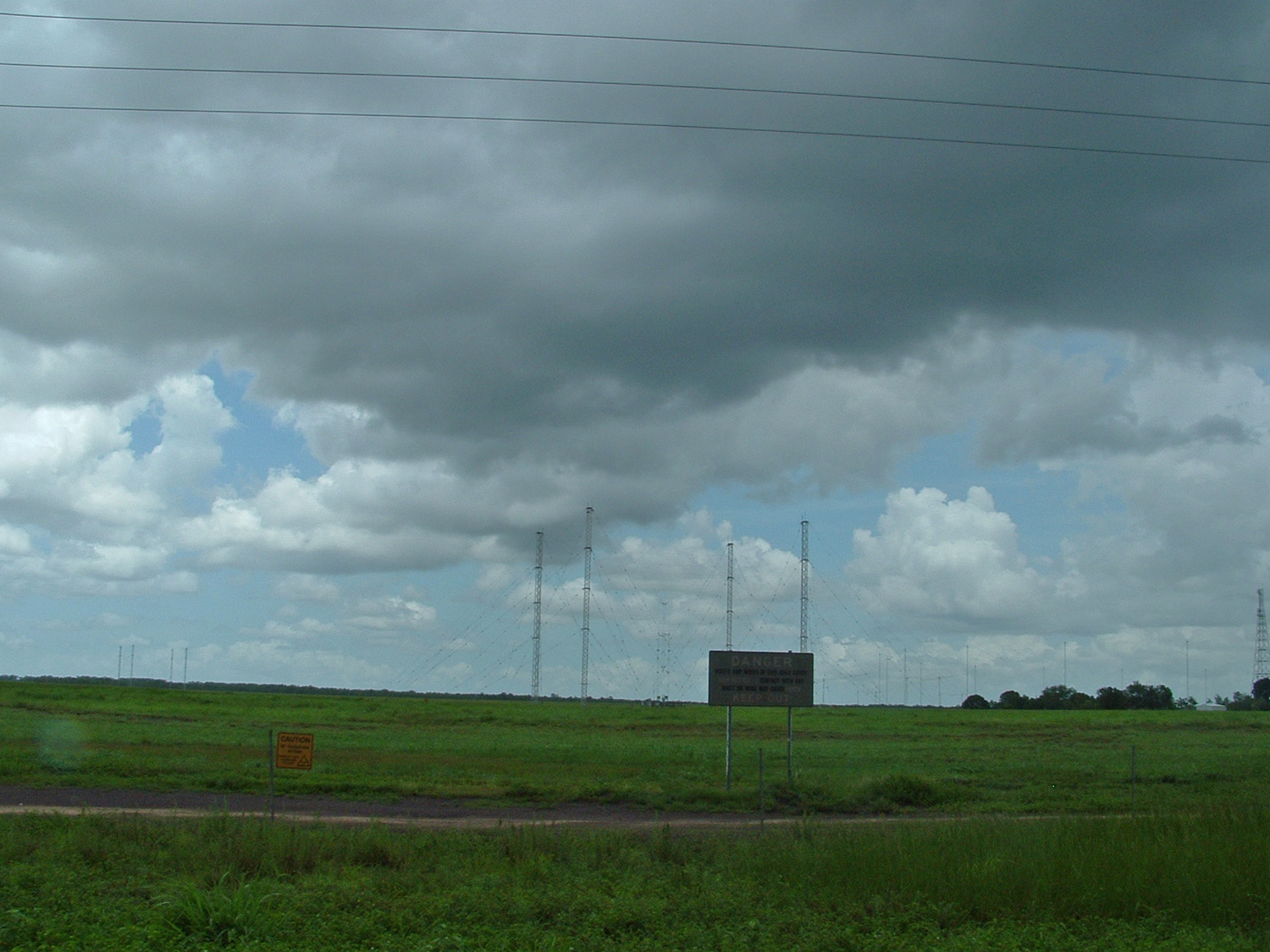
- Middle Point Antenna Farm or Department of Defence Transmitting Station

- Interactive map of Middle Point
- Coordinates: 12°35′56″S 131°19′34″E
- Country: Australia
- State: Northern Territory
- City: Darwin
- LGA: Litchfield Municipality
- Location: 53 km (33 mi) E of Darwin City
- Established: 29 July 1998

Government
  - Territory electorate: Goyder
  - Federal division: Lingiari

Population
  - Total: 58 (2016 census)
- Time zone: UTC+9:30 (ACST)
- Postcode: 0822
Suburbs around Middle Point
Koolpinyah	Koolpinyah	Marrakai
Koolpinyah; Lambells Lagoon	Middle Point	Marrakai
Lambells Lagoon	Lambells Lagoon; Wak Wak; Marrakai	Marrakai
- Locations; Adjoining suburbs

Middle Point is an administrative locality in the Northern Territory of Australia.

This locality derives its name from the ridge of fertile land sticking into the edge of the coastal plains of the Adelaide River.

Some features of this locality are

1. a former CSIRO Research Station,
2. a school (the Middle Point School),
3. a Department of Defence Transmitting Station ,
4. assorted farms,
5. Harrison Dam ,
6. Fogg Dam Conservation Reserve
7. and was the home of the failed Humpty Doo Rice Project .

The 2016 Australian census which was conducted in August 2016 reports that Middle Point had 58 people living within its boundaries.

Middle Point is located within the federal division of Lingiari, the territory electoral division of Goyder and the local government area of the Litchfield Municipality.

== Climate ==
Climate data for Middle Point (2001–2024)
Month	Jan	Feb	Mar	Apr	May	Jun	Jul	Aug	Sep	Oct	Nov	Dec	Year
Record high °C (°F)	39.7 (103.5)	38.0 (100.4)	38.4 (101.1)	37.2 (99.0)	37.3 (99.1)	36.4 (97.5)	36.4 (97.5)	38.8 (101.8)	40.0 (104.0)	42.5 (108.5)	41.6 (106.9)	40.4 (104.7)	42.5 (108.5)
Mean daily maximum °C (°F)	33.4 (92.1)	33.5 (92.3)	33.8 (92.8)	34.2 (93.6)	33.4 (92.1)	32.5 (90.5)	32.8 (91.0)	34.4 (93.9)	36.6 (97.9)	37.4 (99.3)	36.5 (97.7)	35.1 (95.2)	34.5 (94.1)
Mean daily minimum °C (°F)	24.3 (75.7)	24.2 (75.6)	24.1 (75.4)	22.6 (72.7)	19.2 (66.6)	15.6 (60.1)	14.6 (58.3)	15.2 (59.4)	19.2 (66.6)	22.2 (72.0)	23.6 (74.5)	24.3 (75.7)	20.8 (69.4)
Record low °C (°F)	20.5 (68.9)	20.6 (69.1)	16.4 (61.5)	12.7 (54.9)	9.0 (48.2)	4.8 (40.6)	5.3 (41.5)	5.0 (41.0)	8.2 (46.8)	16.2 (61.2)	18.9 (66.0)	20.6 (69.1)	4.8 (40.6)
Average rainfall mm (inches)	309.4 (12.18)	291.4 (11.47)	244.8 (9.64)	95.1 (3.74)	16.9 (0.67)	0.6 (0.02)	0.3 (0.01)	1.8 (0.07)	16.9 (0.67)	47.5 (1.87)	120.3 (4.74)	231.4 (9.11)	1,377.5 (54.23)
Average rainy days (≥ 1.0 mm)	17.0	16.3	15.8	6.1	1.5	0.2	0.1	0.2	1.5	4.8	9.2	14.5	87.2
Source: Australian Bureau of Meteorology
