= Humpty Doo =

- Town
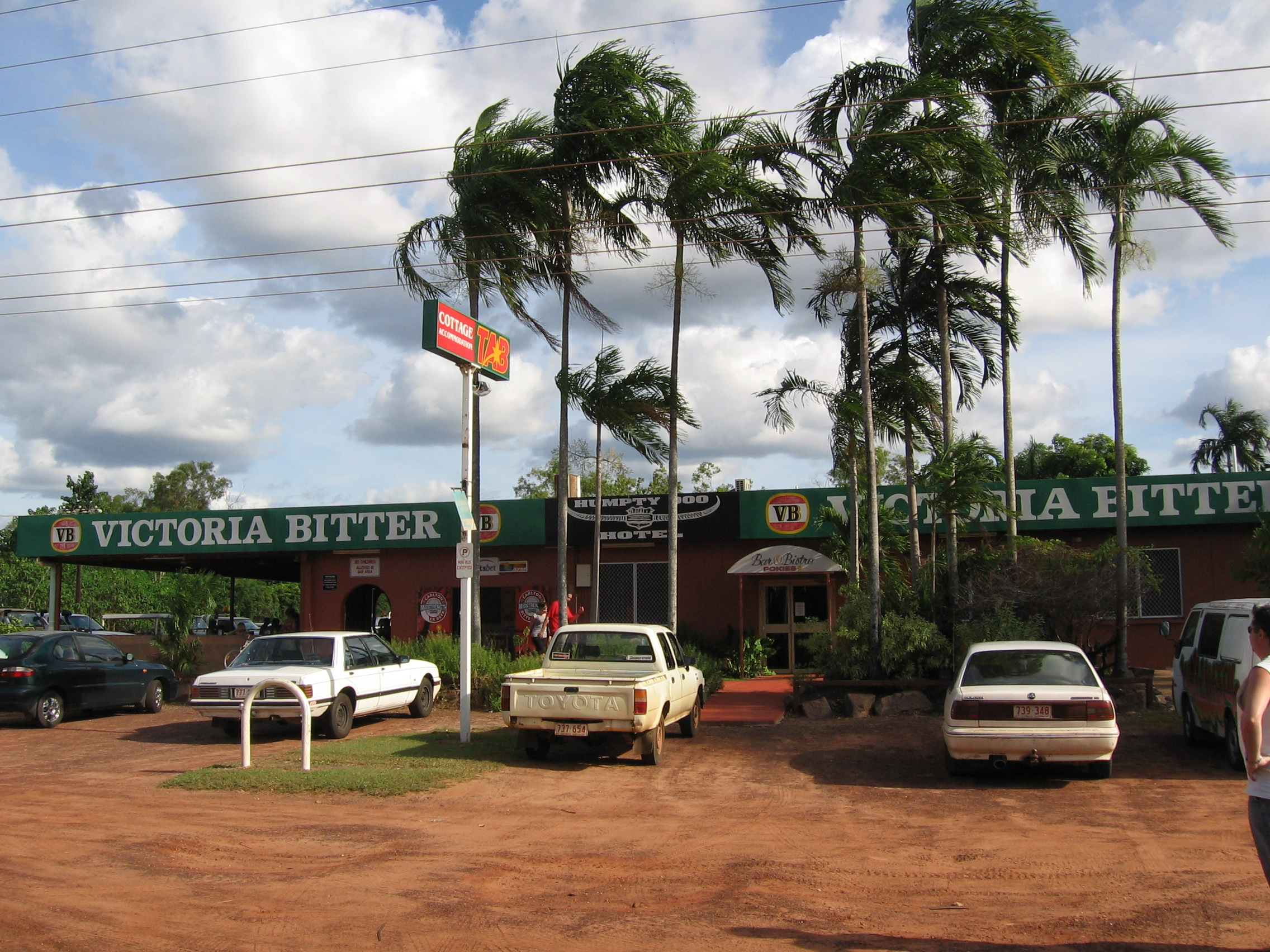
- The Humpty Doo Hotel

- Interactive map of Humpty Doo
- Coordinates: 12°34′31″S 131°6′8″E
- Country: Australia
- State: Northern Territory
- LGA: Litchfield Municipality
- Location: 41.8 km (26.0 mi) from Darwin; 21.9 km (13.6 mi) from Palmerston

Government
  - Territory electorate: Goyder, Nelson
  - Federal division: Lingiari

Population
  - Total: 4,380 (2016 census)
- Postcode: 0836
Localities around Humpty Doo
McMinns Lagoon	McMinns Lagoon; Girraween; Herbert	Herbert
McMinns Lagoon; Bees Creek	Humpty Doo	Lambells Lagoon
Noonamah	Noonamah; Lloyds Creek; Wak Wak	Wak Wak

Humpty Doo is a town in Australia's Northern Territory, situated just south of the Arnhem Highway, approximately 40 km from Darwin. At the 2016 census, Humpty Doo had a population of 4,313. Its local government area is Litchfield Municipality. The town is a popular stopping point for tourists travelling between Darwin and Kakadu National Park, and boasts many attractions of its own. The main industries are agriculture and tourism; however, most residents commute to Darwin or Palmerston for work, and many regard it as a dormitory town.

== Origin of the name ==
The name of the town has frequently been noted on lists of unusual place names.

It first appeared in 1910 as Umpity Doo, and is of uncertain origin. The following derivations have been suggested:

1. from the army slang term "umpty", used for the dash when reading Morse code
2. from a colloquialism meaning "everything done wrong or upside down"
3. from Umdidu, or Umdudu, an Aboriginal name supposedly meaning "popular resting place"

== History ==
The Djerimanga (also known as Wulna) people are recognised as the traditional owners and first inhabitants of an area, from the present day site of Humpty Doo east into the Adelaide River wetlands. Their way of life remained unchanged until the first contact with European explorers in the 19th century, most likely during the 1864 expedition to explore the areas surrounding the Adelaide River, led by Boyle Travers Finniss.

In September 1869, Surveyor General of South Australia, George Goyder, completed work to divide the hinterland surrounding the present day Litchfield Shire into 10-square-mile (26 km^{2}) parcels. These parcels were subsequently divided into smaller allotments, and made available to settlers as pastoral leases and freehold titles.

Following the discovery of gold near Pine Creek during the 1880s, the subsequent influx of Chinese miners to the Northern Territory led to a high demand for food crops such as rice. Rice planted on the floodplains near Humpty Doo was used to meet this demand, with some success. Experiments with other tropical crops, including sugar cane, coffee and rubber, were attempted, most of these planted in the vicinity of Beatrice Hill to the east of the present day town. Experiments were made with livestock too and it was hoped that the banks of the Adelaide River could be developed to include loading facilities for live cattle export.

By 1887, plantations on the floodplains had been abandoned due to the financial difficulties of the land owners. Despite this, rubber trees and coffee bushes showed particular potential. A single harvest of 10 tons of coffee beans was exported to Melbourne during the short lived experiment.

In 1910, the name "Umpity Doo" first appeared, to describe buildings and improvements on a survey plan of Agricultural Lease No. 28, held by Oscar Herbert. Herbert died in 1974 at nearby Koolpinyah Station.

In 1954, after some experimentation by CSIRO and based on previous successful rice crops, a joint Australia-U.S. company called Territory Rice Ltd. was formed and established the Humpty Doo Rice Project, with a plan to irrigate the sub-coastal plain of the Adelaide River in order to commercially produce rice. The rice project was 20 km east of the present town, on part of the Humpty Doo Station where the name "Humpty Doo" was first used. The plan was a complete failure due to several factors: an invasion of geese, soil that was too saline, and an insufficient amount of drainage, all combined with poor management. The company gave up the land to the government in 1962. The irrigation dam, called Fogg Dam, still exists and is a good site for bird watching.

Local resident, Neville Skewes, opened a small store on Mount Bundey Road (now the Arnhem Highway) in 1967. At this time, there was very little development, with most of the surrounding area being bushland. On 11 September 1971, after being granted a liquor licence, Skewes and his wife Helen opened the Humpty Doo Hotel-Motel. The opening of the Hotel coincided with further improvements to the road east to Kakadu and Arnhem Land, and encouraged further urbanisation of the area around Humpty Doo.

In 1982, the Royal Australian Navy opened the Humpty Doo Transmitting Station. This replaced a facility at Coonawarra East that was destroyed by Cyclone Tracy in December 1974. The station supports the naval base HMAS Coonawarra, located in Darwin.

On 21 July 2007, the town played host to the first of the "Triple J goes AWOL" concerts, sponsored and organised by the national youth radio station Triple J.

== Attractions ==
The Humpty Doo Hotel is well known and features in several bush ballads, including "The Man from Humpty Doo" by Ted Egan and "Humpty Doo Waltz" by Slim Dusty. It opened in 1971, survived Cyclone Tracy in 1974 and has since become a local icon. In addition to comfortable visitor accommodation, the hotel features a bar area with open walls, a concrete floor, and an iron roof. Local live music acts regularly perform here.

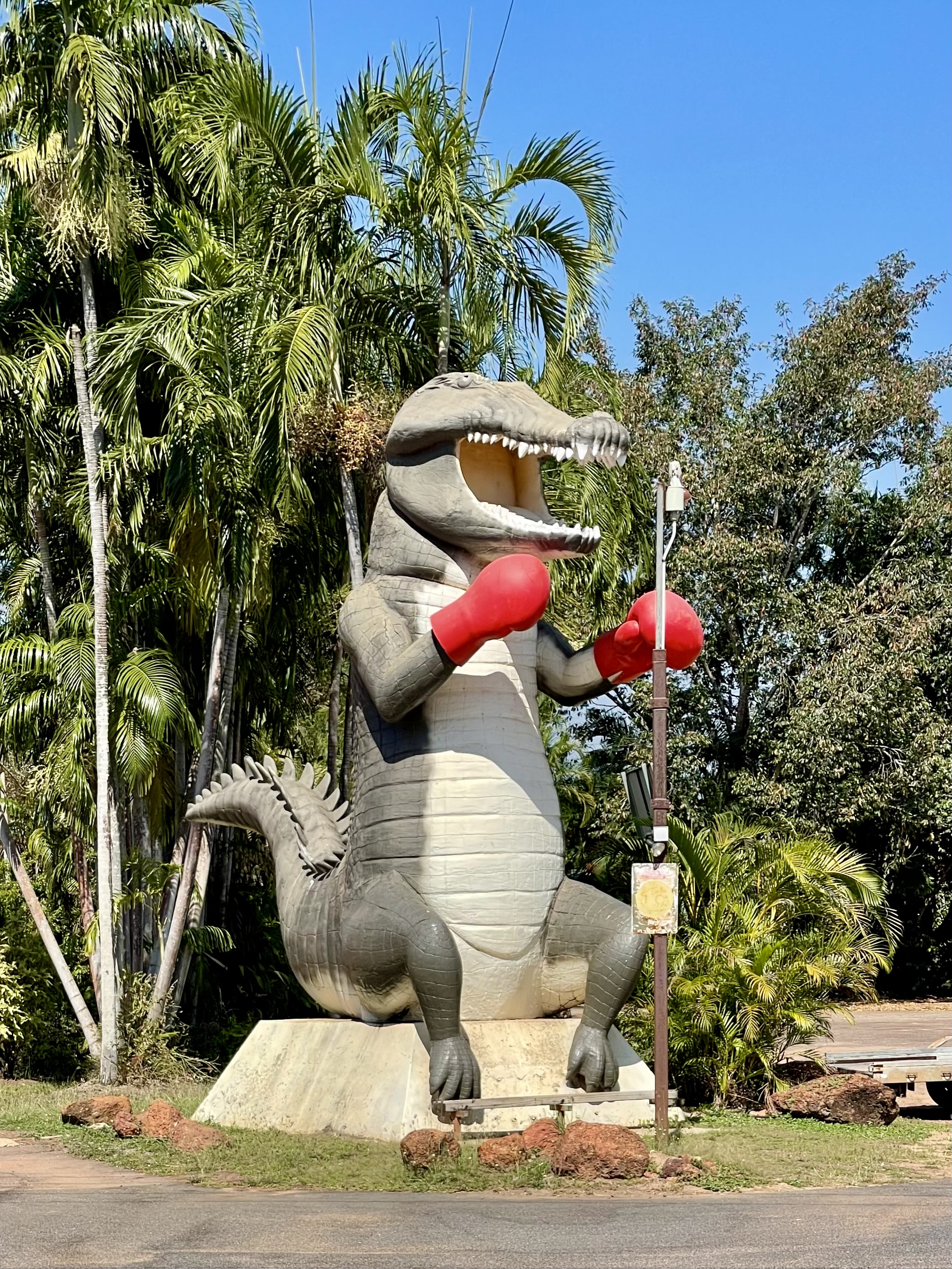
The Big Boxing Crocodile in Humpty Doo, 2021

Another tourist attraction is the Big Boxing Crocodile outside the United Petroleum station (formerly known as the Bush Shop) on the Arnhem Highway. This humorous attraction is a reference to the large crocodile population in the area and is one of the many famous "big things" found around Australia.

Graeme Gow's Reptile World is also an attractive stop for tourists on their way to Kakadu, with a collection of at least 300 species of snake.

The Fogg Dam Conservation Reserve is approximately 25 km (15.5 mi) east of the town and can be accessed off the Arnhem Highway. The reserve is situated on the Adelaide River floodplains, and is one of few publicly accessible natural wetland environments in the Top End all year round. The reserve is a wildlife refuge, and is significant both as a remnant of the failed Territory Rice Ltd venture, and its cultural significance to the local Aboriginal people. Fogg Dam Conservation Reserve features many walking trails and observation areas. Ranger guided activities are also available. At the end of the wet season, in around March–April, native wading birds including jabirus can be observed in large numbers near the dam wall.

Wishart Siding, a heritage listed relic of the North Australia Railway is located near the junction of the Stuart and Arnhem Highways a short distance west of town. The site dates back to 1915 and was used as an accommodation facility for maintenance workers when the line was operational. It is the only facility remaining of its kind along the alignment of the former railway.

The Window on the Wetlands Visitor Centre overlooks the wetlands of the Adelaide River floodplain. The centre sits on top of Beatrice Hill the site of several failed agricultural experiments. Visitors to the centre receive an introduction to the eco-systems of the Northern Coastal Wetlands region. The centre features interactive touch screen displays about the native wildlife and local history, and there is an observation deck on the top floor that provides the best views of the surrounding environment, culturally significant to the local Aboriginal people. Entry is free and the centre is open all year round, seven days a week. The building itself is designed to blend into the natural contours of the landscape.

== Climate ==
Humpty Doo, like the rest of the outer Darwin area, experiences a tropical savannah climate (Köppen Aw), with two distinct seasons. The wet season is when the highest rainfall occurs and runs from November–December through until April. During these months the area is subject to the effects of monsoon troughs and there is the threat of tropical cyclones. The wet season is characterised by higher average temperatures, high humidity, and a greater proportion of rainy days and often associated thunderstorms.

The dry season, from May to October, brings lower humidity, significantly cooler overnight temperatures, and minimal rainfall. It is characterised by sunny days with clear skies.

Climate data for Humpty Doo (Middle Point)
Month	Jan	Feb	Mar	Apr	May	Jun	Jul	Aug	Sep	Oct	Nov	Dec	Year
Mean daily maximum °C (°F)	32.6 (90.7)	32.0 (89.6)	32.4 (90.3)	33.1 (91.6)	32.5 (90.5)	31.3 (88.3)	31.3 (88.3)	32.9 (91.2)	34.7 (94.5)	35.6 (96.1)	35.1 (95.2)	33.8 (92.8)	33.1 (91.6)
Mean daily minimum °C (°F)	23.8 (74.8)	23.9 (75.0)	23.6 (74.5)	22.1 (71.8)	19.4 (66.9)	16.1 (61.0)	14.9 (58.8)	16.8 (62.2)	20.1 (68.2)	22.7 (72.9)	23.7 (74.7)	23.9 (75.0)	20.9 (69.6)
Average precipitation mm (inches)	332.6 (13.09)	284.0 (11.18)	254.7 (10.03)	88.4 (3.48)	22.0 (0.87)	1.6 (0.06)	0.8 (0.03)	2.4 (0.09)	12.9 (0.51)	57.4 (2.26)	125.8 (4.95)	228.6 (9.00)	1,419.4 (55.88)
Average rainy days	17.4	16.2	14.9	5.8	1.6	0.1	0.2	0.3	1.3	4.8	9.6	13.4	85.6

== Infrastructure ==
=== Education ===
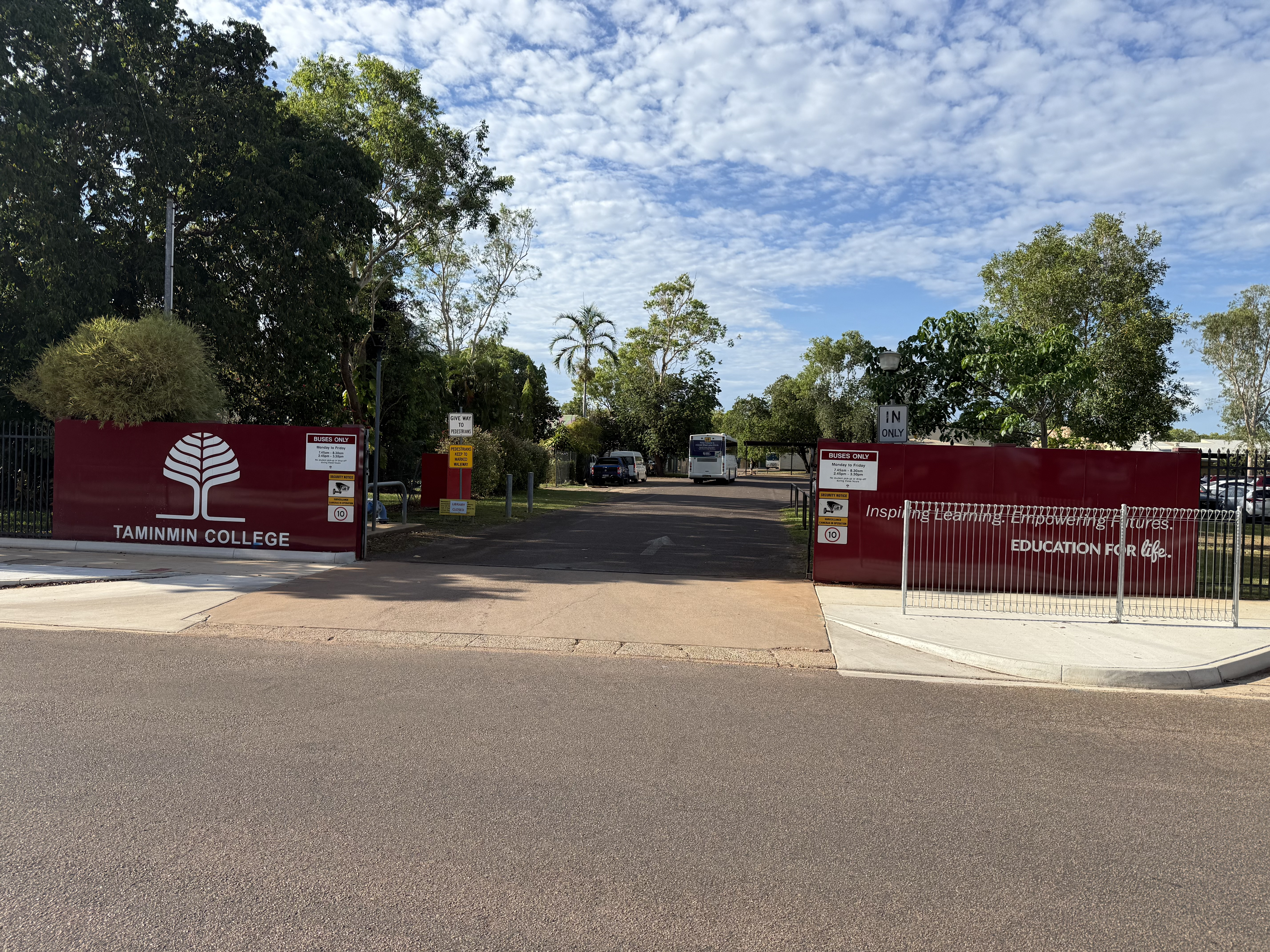
Taminmin College, October 2025

There are several schools in Humpty Doo catering for students in Transition through to Year 12.

Humpty Doo Primary School, located on Freds Pass Rd, is a public school for Transition - Year 6 students. The site also has a pre-school and offers an after school childcare program. The school includes students from diverse ethnic backgrounds: 15% of students identify as Aboriginal or Torres Strait Islanders, another 25% of the student population are from Vietnamese, Thai, Filipino, Indonesian, Cambodian, Spanish, Dutch, or Chinese language backgrounds. There were 394 students enrolled at the school as of August 2010.

Saint Francis of Assisi School and Early Learning Centre on Challenor Circuit is a Catholic school that provides an alternative for students in Transition to Year 7. The school was established in 1997 and draws enrollments from across the rural outer Darwin. As of 2012, the total student enrollment is approximately 160. The principal is Neal Maxwell.

The town has a public secondary school, Taminmin College, formerly Taminmin High School. Established in 1983, the college provides middle years schooling for students in Years 7 – 9, a senior college for Years 10 – 12 and Vocational Education and Training (VET) pathways. Student enrollments are drawn from an area of over 7000sq km. School facilities include a 150ha conservation area for the study of conservation and land management, a 75ha mixed produce and livestock farm for agricultural studies, an air-conditioned gymnasium, sports fields, and a library which is open to students and the wider Humpty Doo community. The school prepares senior students to sit their [NTCET] examinations, as well as having programs in place to provide vocational pathways such as trade apprenticeships on completion of studies. The current principal is Mrs. Sue Healy. As of August 2019, there were 1110 students enrolled at the college.

Tertiary and further vocational education and training are available through Charles Darwin University, with campuses in both Darwin and Palmerston.

=== Utilities ===
The Humpty Doo waste transfer station is one of three waste management and recycling facilities operated by the Shire of Litchfield, and is the only station accommodating commercial waste. It is open 7 days per week. There is a fee that applies for commercial users. Non-recyclable waste is compacted and transferred to the Shoal Bay Waste Management Facility. The facility is capable of handling cardboard and paper, glass bottles, whitegoods, steel, plastic containers, aluminium cans, cardboard, green waste, and oil.

== Notable residents ==
- The World Wrestling Entertainment character Outback Jack—portrayed by Peter Stilsbury between 1986 and 1988—was billed as coming from Humpty Doo. The character was an outback bushman in the vein of Crocodile Dundee.
- Professional Australian rules footballers to have come from Humpty Doo include Nakia Cockatoo and Tayla Thorn.
- Harold Thomas, the designer and copyright holder of the Australian Aboriginal flag moved here in 1972 and still lives there.
- Rugby player Calum Gahan was born and raised in Humpty Doo.

== Trivia ==
- The 9th Fighter Squadron of the 49th Fighter Group attached to the United States' 5th Air Force gained the nickname "Humpty Doo Fighters" while stationed in the area in 1942. The squadron was accommodated in a camp referred to by Lucien Hubbard as Humpty Doo after the cattle station with the same name while acting as a publicity correspondent. The actual campsite location was further south than the township of Humpty Doo, to the east of Noonamah.
- A rhabdovirus isolated from the midge Lasiohelea spp. at Humpty Doo is referred to as the "Humpty Doo virus". No cases of human infection by Humpty Doo virus are known. In the literature of virology, it is only referenced as infecting kangaroos.
- A bacterial species of the genus Burkholderia was first isolated during routine screening of a water well in Humpty Doo. Burkholderia humptydooensis has been proposed as its taxonomic name.
- From September 2009 to December 2009, the numbers station Cherry Ripe is believed to have been broadcast from Humpty Doo until its discontinuation.
- The wishbone spider species Aname humptydoo owes its specific epithet to being collected from Humpty Doo. It is yet to be recorded from any other locality.
