= Girraween =

Girraween may refer to:

- Girraween, New South Wales
- Girraween, Northern Territory
- Girraween National Park in Queensland

== See also ==
- Girrawheen, Western Australia
- Electoral district of Girrawheen, an electorate of the Western Australian Legislative Assembly
