= Northern Australia =

Northern regions of Australia

- Area
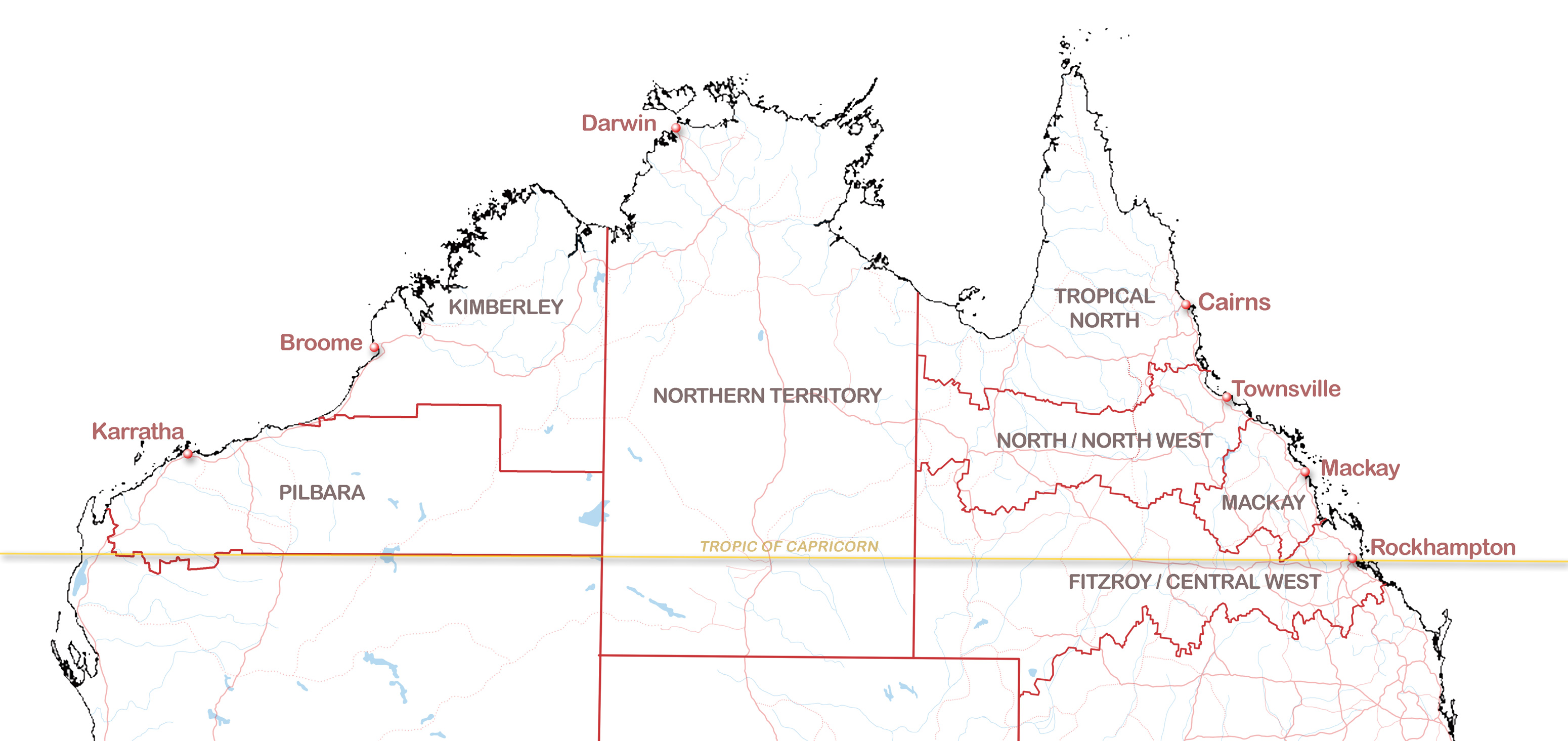
- A map showing the extent of the area

The geographic term Northern Australia is defined by Northern Australia Infrastructure Facility Act 2016 as all of the Northern Territory and those parts of Queensland and Western Australia that intersect with the Tropic of Capricorn, including the Australian Indian Ocean Territories of Christmas Island and Cocos (Keeling) Islands. Those local government areas of Western Australia and Queensland that lie partially in the north are included.

Although it comprises 53% of the total area of Australia, Northern Australia has only 5.2% of the Australian population (1.4 million). However, it includes several sources of Australian exports, being coal from the Great Dividing Range in Queensland/New South Wales and the natural gas and iron ore of the Pilbara region in Western Australia. It also includes major natural tourist attractions, such as Uluru (Ayers Rock), the Great Barrier Reef and the Kakadu National Park.

== Geography and climate ==
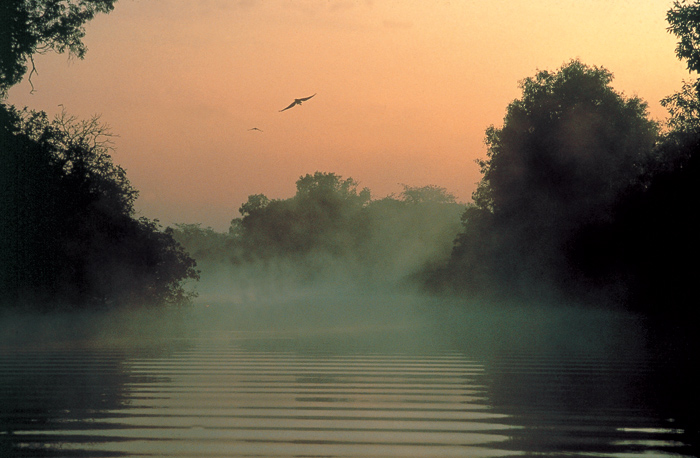
A billabong in the Kakadu National Park, Northern Territory. The monsoon climate of northern Australia is hot and humid in summer.

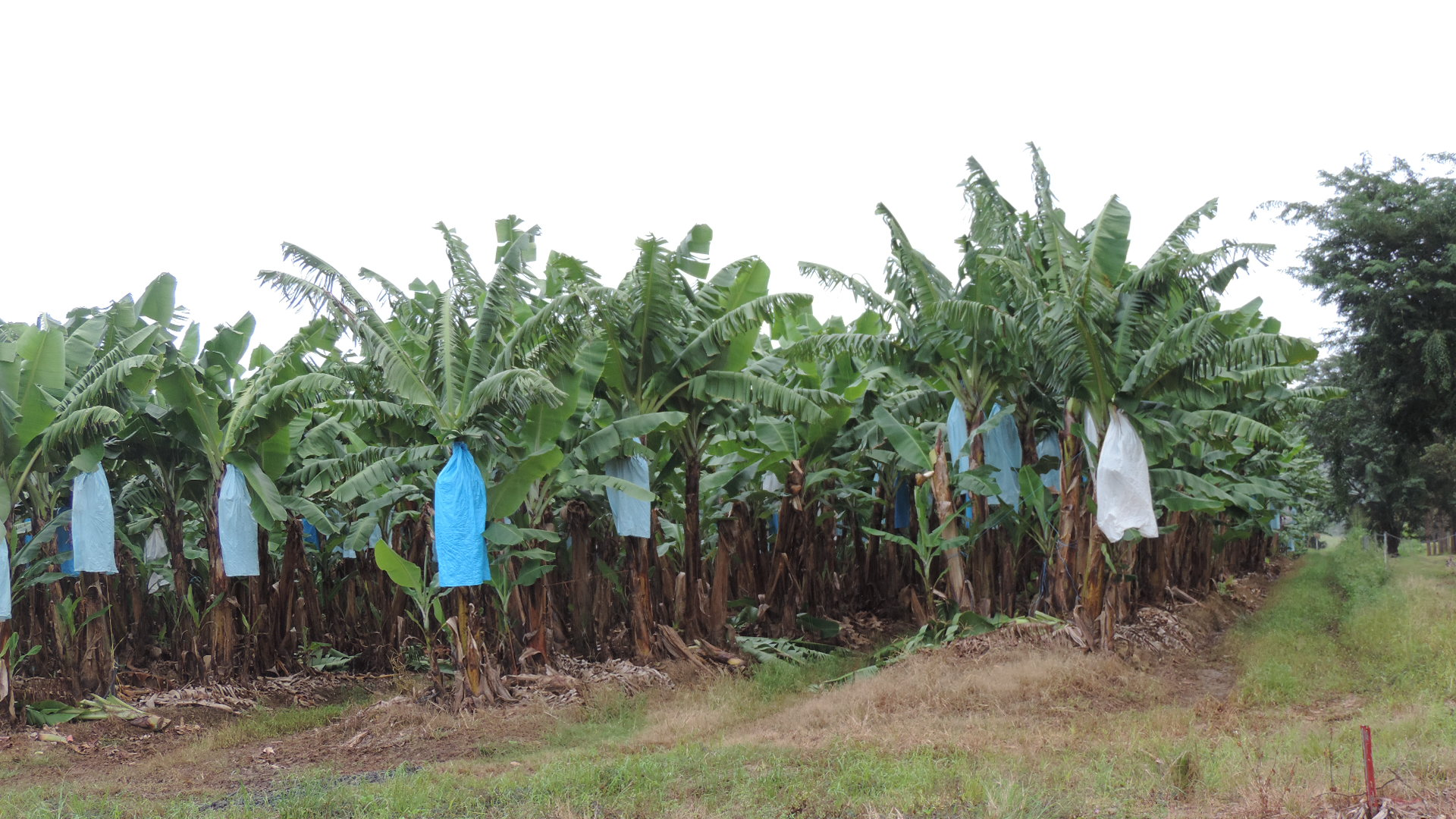
A banana farm in Far North Queensland, 2018

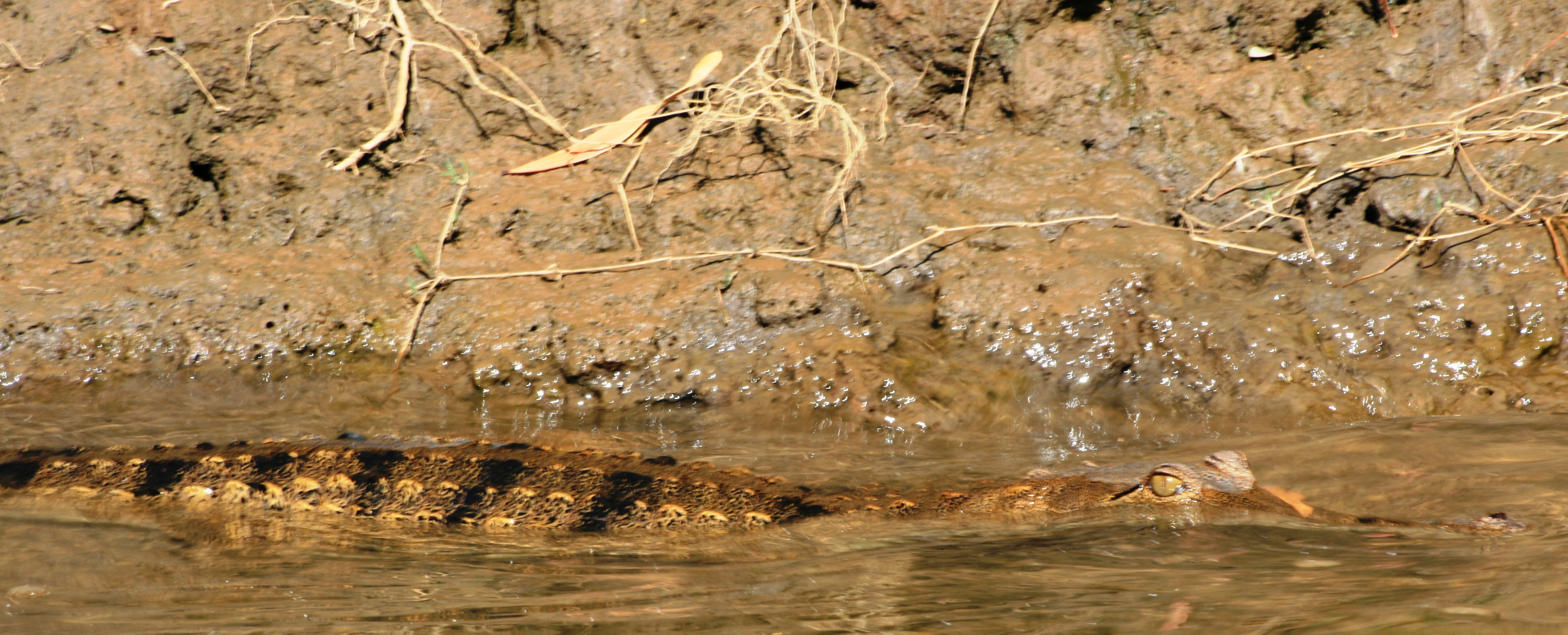
A crocodile in Danggu Gorge National Park in the Kimberley, 2008

Almost all of Northern Australia is a huge ancient craton that has not experienced geological upheaval since the end of the Precambrian. The only exception to this generalisation is the Wet Tropics of northern Queensland, where active volcanoes have been present as recently as the Pleistocene.

The vast craton in the north and west contains a number of quite rugged mountain ranges, of which the highest are the MacDonnell and Musgrave Ranges on the southern border of the Northern Territory. These rise to over 1,500 metres (4,900 ft), but the most spectacular features are the deep gorges of rivers such as the Finke. Most of the craton, however, is distinctly flat and generally low-lying with an average elevation of around 400 metres (1,300 ft), whilst in the Lake Eyre Basin most of the land is not far above sea level. Northern Australia is known for its abundance of pristine beaches. These beaches have seen an increase in marine debris floating in from Asia.

Major settlements in the region include Darwin, Cairns, Townsville, Mackay, Rockhampton, Gladstone and Mount Isa.

The climate of the north of Australia ranges from arid (Köppen BWh) in the south to monsoonal (Köppen Aw) in the Top End and Kimberley. On the eastern coast, however, the climate is much more humid and ranges from humid sub-tropical (Köppen Cfa around Brisbane and Cwa further north) to humid tropical (Köppen Am and Af) in the Wet Tropics. Except in the western part of the Pilbara and Gascoyne where the heaviest rain often occurs from May to July under northwest cloudbands, rainfall is heavily concentrated in the "summer" months from November to March. For instance, in Burketown, the months May to September are rainless in over fifty percent of years, with over eighty percent of Augusts having no rain.

Temperatures in summer are generally unpleasantly hot apart from the eastern coastal belt. Maximum temperatures elsewhere between October and April range from 30 °C (86 °F) in the south in April to around 40 °C (104 °F) in the inland Pilbara and Kimberley before the wet season breaks. Further north, maxima are consistently around 32 °C (90 °F) but extreme humidity makes conditions very unpleasant. On the coast, maxima in January range from 29 °C (84 °F) in the south to 32 °C (90 °F), with minima generally around 21 °C (70 °F).

In July, temperatures show a wider range, from 31 °C (88 °F) in the north to around 19 °C (66 °F) in the south, where minima can be as low as 5 °C (41 °F) in Alice Springs in June and July.

=== Climate variability ===
The above generalisations, however, mask the immense variability of the climate throughout the whole region. With the exception of the extreme north of the Northern Territory, rainfall variability throughout Northern Australia is quite markedly higher than most comparable climates in other continents. For example, at Charters Towers, the rainfall over the wet season can vary from less than 100 millimetres (3.9 in) in 1901/1902 to over 2,000 millimetres (79 in) in 1973/1974. The chief cause of this very high variability is erratic tropical cyclones, which occur from December to April and in many places can deliver as much as 350 millimetres (14 in) of rain over a day or two, causing extremely large floods in the region's rivers. For example, in April 1898, a tropical cyclone gave 740 millimetres (29 in) in one day at Whim Creek in the Pilbara, but for the whole of 1924 that same station recorded only 4 millimetres (0.16 in) for the whole year. Tropical cyclones may cross the coast anywhere in Northern Australia but are most frequent between Derby and Onslow on the west side and between Cooktown and Rockhampton on the east. Inland, variability of rainfall is related to the penetration of the summer monsoon, with high rainfall in seasons like 1973/1974, 1975/1976 and from 1998 to 2001 when the monsoon is most powerful.

Climate change has seen increases of up to fifty percent in annual rainfall since 1967 over the western half of Australia's tropics, but has not seen any increase over the east. The increase over the west is sometimes attributed to aerosol pollution over industrialising areas of China and India, but may be related to global warming.

Frosts are common in the southern inland during the winter, but in some years, such as 1998, they are much less frequent due to the recent incidence of warm pools in the Indian Ocean.

== Soils ==
Except in the Lake Eyre Basin and adjacent areas to the east, the soils of Northern Australia are quite remarkable in global terms for their low fertility and difficulty of working. Most of them consist chiefly of hard laterite developed during period of climate much more humid than even that of Darwin today. Since there has been no mountain building in the region since the Precambrian and no glaciation since the Carboniferous, the region's soils have generally been under continuous weathering without renewal for over 250 million years, as against less than ten thousand for most soils in Europe, Asia, North America and New Zealand which have been formed from recent mountain building or glacial scouring of the land.

This immensely long weathering time means that nutrient levels in Northern Australian soils are exceptionally low because practically all soluble minerals have long been weathered out. The major constituents of most soils in Northern Australia are iron and aluminium oxides, both of which are not only very insoluble but also serve to reduce the soil pH and remove phosphorus from the soil as insoluble iron and aluminium phosphates. The insolubility of these metal oxides also serves, under the extremely harsh conditions during the dry season in the north and generally in the south, to create massive sheets which are impossible to plough.

In the Lake Eyre Basin, deposition from volcanic regions to the east has produce cracking clay soils of high fertility which are still often fairly low in phosphorus, but have good levels of potassium, calcium and sulfur. These soils provide the good grassland for grazing in the region. The youthful, volcanic Wet Tropics has a number of areas of fertile alluvial soils that support intensive horticulture.

== Flora and fauna ==
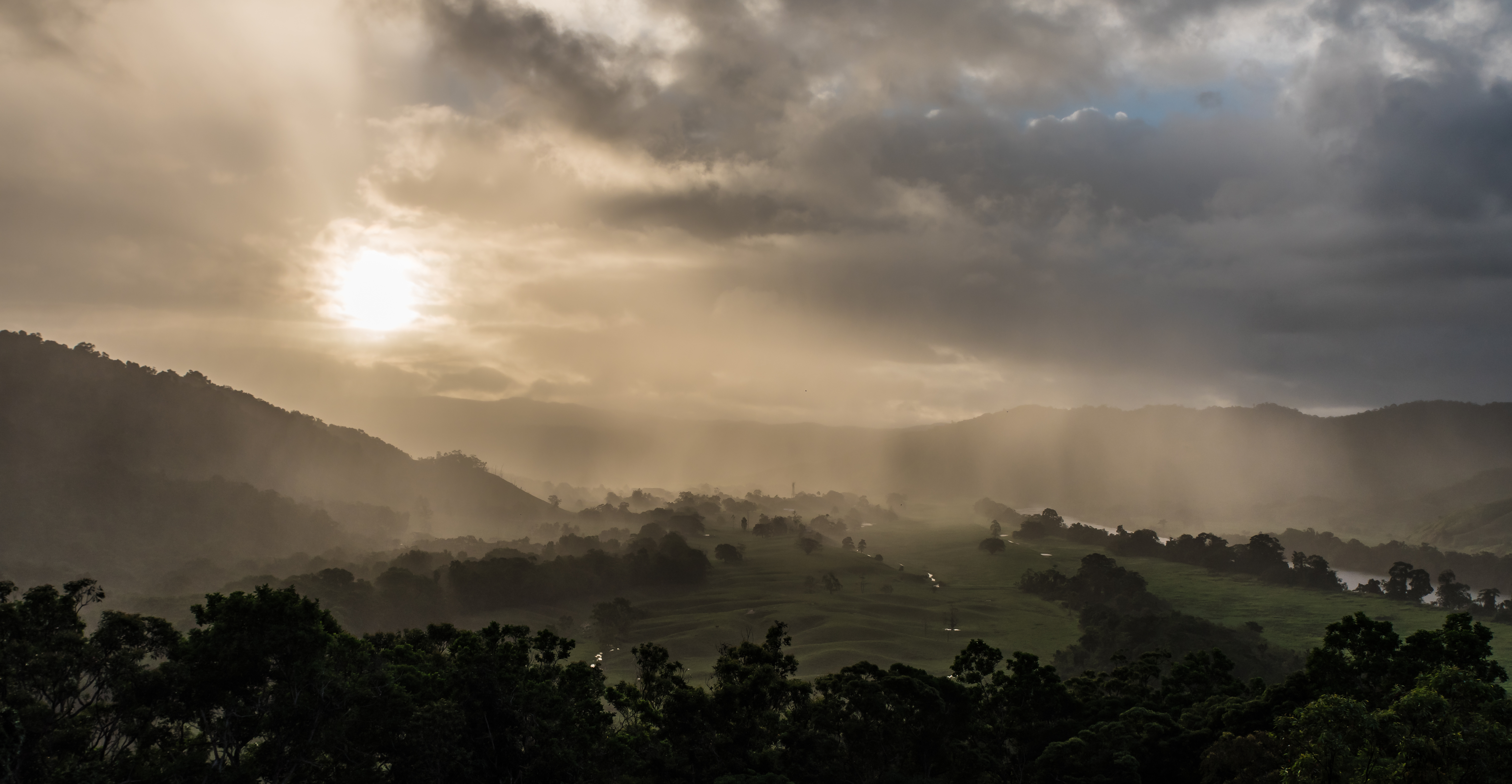
Daintree National Park, 2019

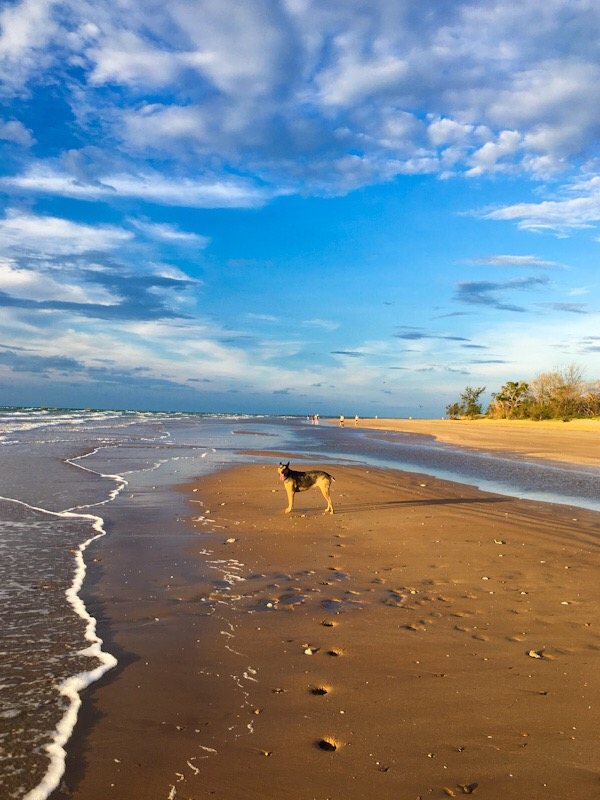
Lee Point, Northern Territory, 2019

The extreme soil poverty of most of Northern Australia has the effect of confining large herbivores such as the kangaroo to the better soil in the dry grasslands since they cannot digest the extreme poor fodder from the northern monsoonal regions. However, the frequency of fires during the desiccating dry season from May to September means that forests cannot establish themselves except in sheltered places. This has created a unique type of tropical savanna environment in which fires play a crucial role in elevating the extremely low nutrient levels and aiding growth during the wet season.

The many large rivers of the region such as the Mitchell, Gilbert-Einasleigh, South and East Alligator, Daly, Ord and Fitzroy support populations of the saltwater and freshwater crocodiles, which are by far the best-known animals of the region. There are also a number of species of python. Further south, where rivers are not adequate to support crocodiles, there exist a number of quite unique lizard species.

The Wet Tropics, like all tropical rainforests, is very rich in unique species, and contains some of the most primitive flowering plants in the world.

Rangers are employed to monitor protected areas. Reports of illegal foreign fishing boats in Australian waters were increasing in 2025.

== Economy ==
Northern Australia faces major challenges to economic growth. Although the climate and soil poverty have defied all attempts to develop large-scale agriculture in large parts of Northern Australia, some agricultural and horticultural industries have seen strong growth. For example, in the Wet Tropics, mango, sugar cane and banana growing are major industries.

Notable failures in ventures into attempting rice cultivation have occurred in both the Ord River area in the Kimberley region of Western Australia, and the Humpty Doo Rice Project in the Northern Territory.

Northern Australia produces more than 93% of Australia’s mangoes, more than 94% of Australia’s bananas, and more than 95% of Australia’s sugar. Sheep and beef cattle are also raised successfully across Northern Australia, usually on extremely large properties. Northern Australia accounts for 64% of Australia’s national beef cattle herd. The geological factors that make Northern Australia's soils so unsuited to traditional agriculture, however, make it extremely rich in ores of abundant, insoluble lithophile metals such as aluminium, iron and uranium. It has the world's largest deposits of all these metals, and as less reactive chalcophile metals have been depleted Northern Australia has become very important to the economies of mineral-poor Asian nations. It was Northern Australian iron ore that fed the Japanese post-war economic miracle and the Four Tigers of South Korea, Taiwan, Hong Kong and Singapore. At 2015, Northern Australia accounted for over 70% of Australia’s known resources of iron ore, lead, and zinc.

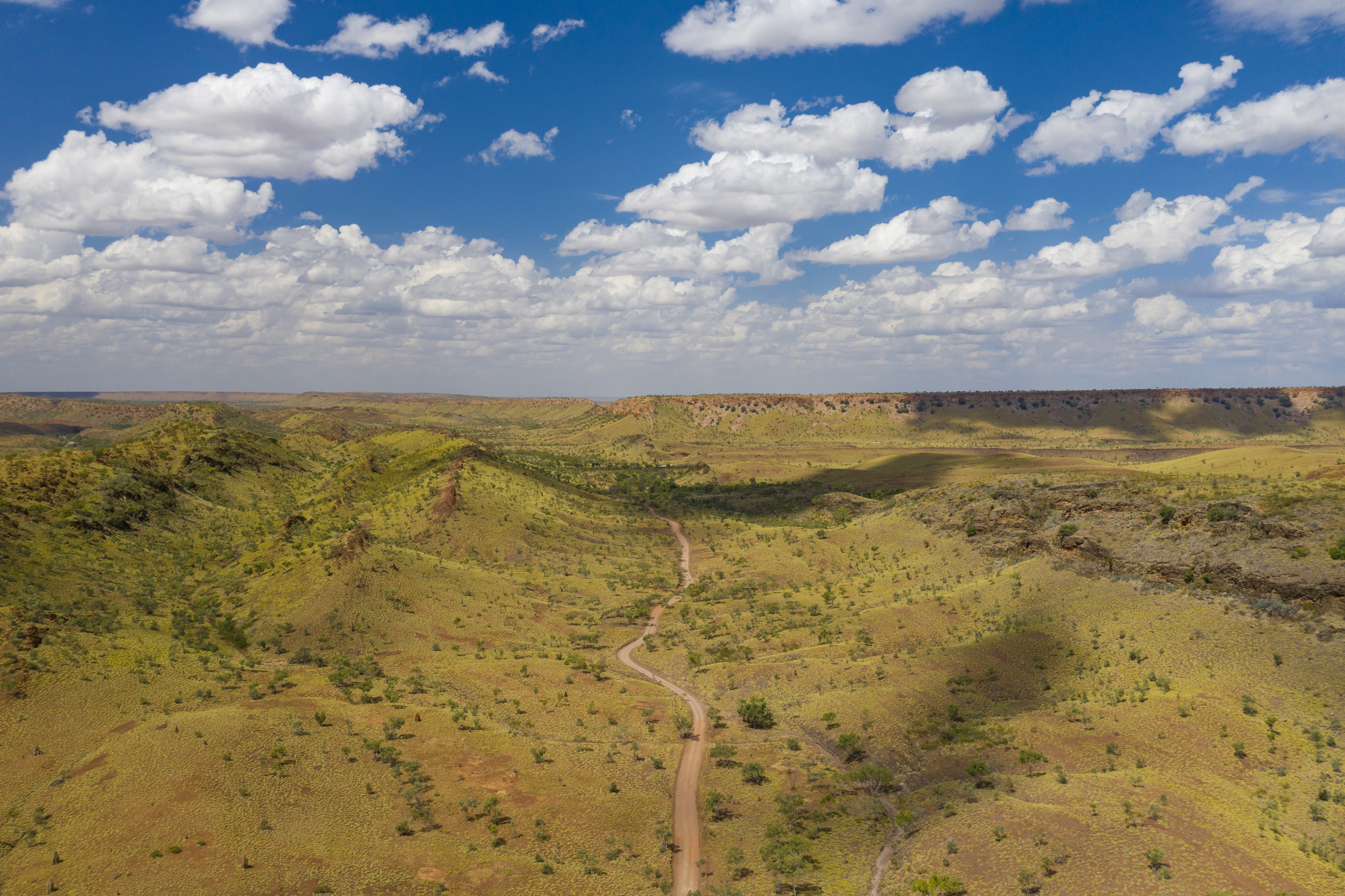
Sawpit Gorge, Western Australia, 2021

During the 1950s and 1960s, the government of Robert Menzies attempted to develop farming in Northern Australia, but pests made this impossible even when varieties of rice suited to the soils were developed. Today, however, sugar cane growing has expanded into the Ord River basin without surpassing cattle and tourism as the main industries of the region.

=== Proposals for development of Northern Australia ===
Proponents for the development of Northern Australia have been found since before Federation and include:

- Alfred Searcy
- George Pearce
- Gina Rinehart in Northern Australia and then some: changes we need to make our country rich (2013) and through Australians for Northern Development and Economic Vision.

The previous iteration of these proposals is found in the Our North Our Future: White Paper On Developing Northern Australia published by the Abbott government on 18 June 2015.

Built on this 2015 White Paper, The Northern Australia Action Plan 2024-2029 outlines the Australian Government's economic development plan that leverages the region's comparative advantages of natural resources, strategic location, environment and cultural heritage.

== See also ==
- Eastern states of Australia
- North West Australia
- Southern Australia
