= Koolpinyah, Northern Territory =

Koolpinyah
- Suburb
- Interactive map of Koolpinyah
- Coordinates: 12°21′32″S 131°12′58″E
- Country: Australia
- State: Northern Territory
- LGA: Litchfield Municipality
- Location: 37 km (23 mi) E of Darwin City
- Established: 4 April 2007

Government
  - Territory electorate: Goyder
  - Federal division: Lingiari

Population
  - Total: 0 (2016 census)
- Time zone: UTC+9:30 (ACST)
- Postcode: 0822
- Mean max temp: 32.1 °C (89.8 °F)
- Mean min temp: 23.2 °C (73.8 °F)
- Annual rainfall: 1,725.1 mm (67.92 in)
Suburbs around Koolpinyah
| Gunn Point | Glyde Point; Vernon Islands | Hotham |
| Murrumujuk; Shoal Bay; Howard Springs; Girraween | Koolpinyah | Hotham; Marrakai |
| Girraween | Girraween; Herbert; Black Jungle; Lambells Lagoon; Middle Point; Marrakai | Marrakai |
- Locations; Adjoining localities

Koolpinyah is a locality in the Northern Territory of Australia located about 37 kilometres (23 mi) east of the territory capital of Darwin.

The locality consists of land bounded to the east by the Adelaide River and in part to the north by the Clarence Strait. This locality is named after Koolpinyah Station, a pastoral lease established on land now partly included in the locality in 1908 by Evan and Oscar Herbert, the sons of Charles Edward Herbert, a judge, a politician and a former Government Resident of the Northern Territory. The name is ultimately derived from "Gulpinyah", an Aboriginal name for a waterhole located near the station’s homestead. Its boundaries and name were gazetted on 4 April 2007.

The 2016 Australian census which was conducted in August 2016 reports that Koolpinyah had no people living within its boundaries.

Koolpinyah is located within the federal division of Lingiari, the territory electoral division of Goyder and within the local government area of the Litchfield Municipality.
