= Daly, Northern Territory =

Daly
- Suburb
- Interactive map of Daly
- Coordinates: 12°44′32″S 131°14′37″E
- Country: Australia
- State: Northern Territory
- LGA: Litchfield Municipality
- Location: 51 km (32 mi) SE of Darwin
- Established: 29 October 1997

Government
  - Territory electorate: Nelson
  - Federal division: Lingiari

Population
  - Total: 0 (2016 census)
- Time zone: UTC+9:30 (ACST)
- Postcode: 0822
- Mean max temp: 32.1 °C (89.8 °F)
- Mean min temp: 23.2 °C (73.8 °F)
- Annual rainfall: 1,725.1 mm (67.92 in)
Suburbs around Daly
Wak Wak; Lloyd Creek	Wak Wak	Wak Wak; Marrakai
Acacia Hills	Daly	Marrakai
Manton	Manton; Marrakai	Marrakai
- Locations; Adjoining localities

Daly is a locality in the Northern Territory of Australia located about 51 kilometres (32 mi) south-east of the territory capital of Darwin.

Daly is located on land on the north side of the Adelaide River. The locality was named after the Town of Daly which was surveyed in 1869 and was never occupied or used as a town and whose name was derived from the Daly Range, a nearby geographical feature which was named in 1862 after Dominick Daly, the then Governor of South Australia. Its boundaries and name were gazetted on 29 October 1997.

The 2016 Australian census which was conducted in August 2016 reports that Daly had no people living within its boundaries.

Daly is located within the federal division of Lingiari, the territory electoral division of Nelson and within the local government area of the Litchfield Municipality.
