= Wak Wak, Northern Territory =

Suburb in Northern Territory, Australia

Wak Wak Darwin, Northern Territory
- Coordinates: 12°39′59.0″S 131°14′34.4″E
- Population: 0 (2016 census)
- Established: 4 April 2007
- Postcode(s): 0830
- Time zone: ACST (UTC+9:30)
- Location: 55 km (34 mi) E of Darwin
- LGA(s): Litchfield Municipality
- Territory electorate(s): Nelson
- Federal division(s): Lingiari
Mean max temp	Mean min temp	Annual rainfall
32.1 °C; 90 °F	23.2 °C; 74 °F	1,725.1 mm 67.9 in
Suburbs around Wak Wak:
Humpty Doo	Lambells Lagoon	Middle Point
Lloyd Creek	Wak Wak	Marrakai
Acacia Hills	Daly	Marrakai
- Footnotes: Adjoining suburbs

Wak Wak is a locality in the Northern Territory of Australia located about 55 kilometres (34 mi) east of the territory capital of Darwin.

The locality is named for the local Aboriginal word for 'crow'.

The 2016 Australian census which was conducted in August 2016 reports that Wak Wak had no people living within its boundaries.

Wak Wak is located within the federal division of Lingiari, the territory electoral division of Nelson and the local government area of the Litchfield Municipality.
