= Manton, Northern Territory =

Manton Darwin, Northern Territory
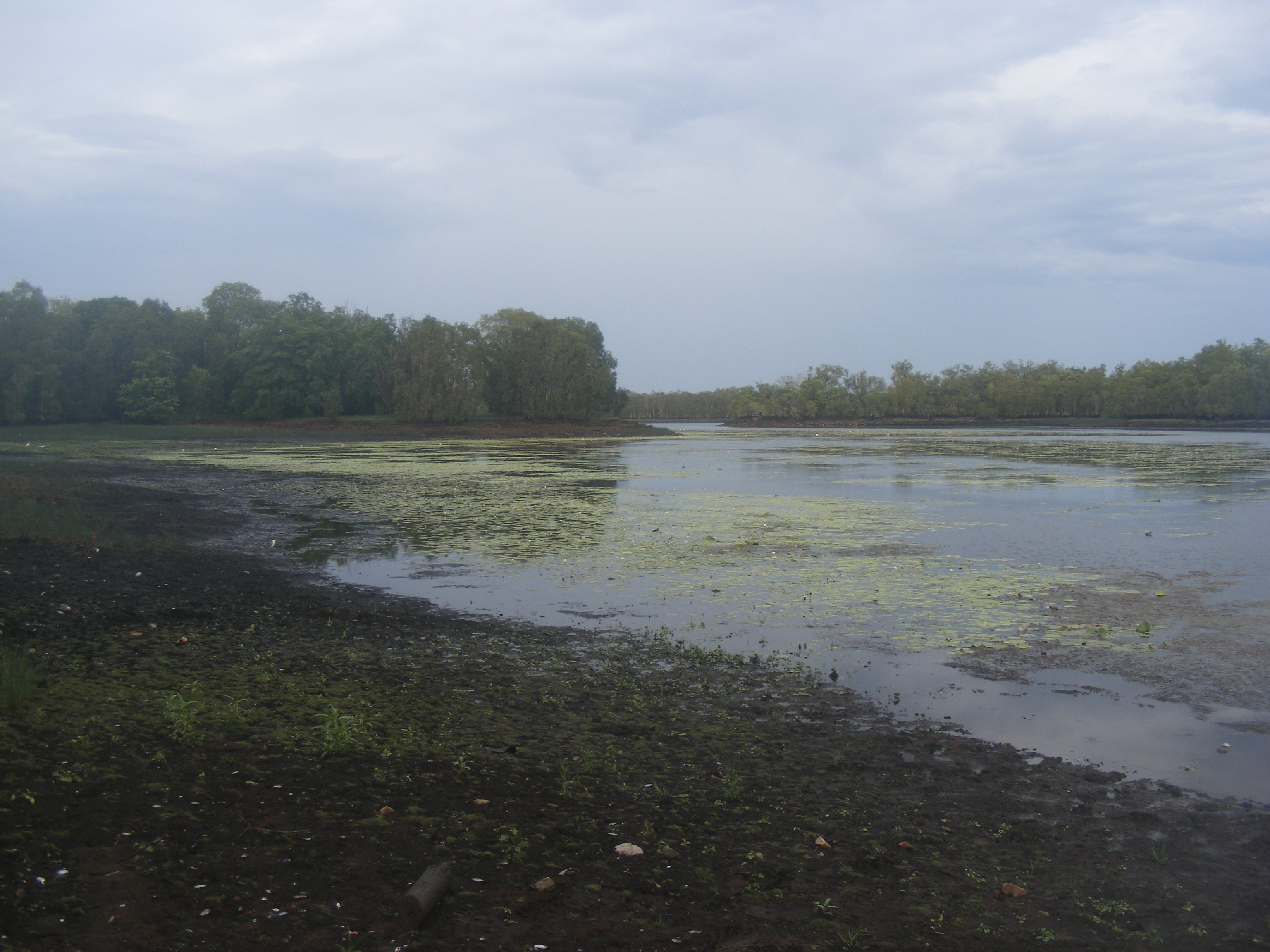
- Manton Dam

- Coordinates: 12°49′26.79″S 131°09′24.10″E
- Population: 89 (2016 census)
- LGA(s): Litchfield Municipality
Suburbs around Manton:
Acacia Hills	Acacia Hills; Daly	Daly
Acacia Hills	Manton	Daly; Marrakai
Darwin River Dam; Lake Bennett	Lake Bennett	Marrakai
- Footnotes: Adjoining suburbs

Manton is an outer rural locality of Darwin. The name is derived from Manton Dam on the Manton River, named by Government Resident B. T. Finniss for his second-in-command James Thomas Manton.
