= Black Jungle =

Black Jungle Darwin, Northern Territory
- Coordinates: 12°31′31.92″S 131°12′29.92″E
- Population: 0 (2016 census)
- LGA(s): Litchfield Municipality
- Territory electorate(s): Goyder
- Federal division(s): Lingiari
Suburbs around Black Jungle:
Koolpinyah	Koolpinyah	Koolpinyah
Koolpinyah; Herbert	Black Jungle	Koolpinyah; Lambells Lagoon
Lambells Lagoon	Lambells Lagoon	Lambells Lagoon
- Footnotes: Adjoining suburbs

Black Jungle is an outer rural location on the outskirts of Darwin. The name of the locality derived from "Black Jungle" which first appeared on a plan of the "Umpity Doo Homestead" block, Agricultural Lease No 28 in 1910.
