= Hotham, Northern Territory =

Hotham Northern Territory
- Coordinates: 12°16′38″S 131°23′34″E
- Population: 0 (2016 census)
- Established: 4 April 2007
- Postcode(s): 0822
- Time zone: ACST (UTC+9:30)
- Location: 62 km (39 mi) E of Darwin City
- LGA(s): unincorporated area
- Territory electorate(s): Goyder
- Federal division(s): Lingiari
| Mean max temp | Mean min temp | Annual rainfall |
| 32.1 °C; 90 °F | 23.2 °C; 74 °F | 1,725.1 mm 67.9 in |
Suburbs around Hotham:
| Vernon Islands | Vernon Islands; Van Diemen Gulf | Van Diemen Gulf |
| Vernon Islands; Glyde Point; Koolpinyah | Hotham | Van Diemen Gulf; Marrakai |
| Koolpinyah | Marrakai | Marrakai |
- Footnotes: Locations; Adjoining localities

Hotham is a locality in the Northern Territory of Australia located about 62 kilometres (39 mi) east of the territorial capital of Darwin.

The locality consists of land bounded to the west by the Adelaide River and to the north by the coastline of Van Diemen Gulf which includes the headland, Cape Hotham. The locality was named after Cape Hotham which itself was named by Phillip Parker King in 1818 after the Royal Navy officer, Rear Admiral Sir Henry Hotham. Its boundaries and name were gazetted on 4 April 2007.

The locality includes part of the Djukbinj National Park.

Hotham includes the site of the first attempt by the Government of South Australia to create a settlement in the Northern Territory in 1864, which was listed on the Northern Territory Heritage Register on 12 January 2000 under the name of Escape Cliffs.

The 2016 Australian census which was conducted in August 2016 reports that Hotham had no people living within its boundaries.

Hotham is located within the federal division of Lingiari, the territory electoral division of Goyder and within the unincorporated areas of the Northern Territory.
