= Herbert, Northern Territory =

Herbert Darwin, Northern Territory
- Coordinates: 12°32′32.35″S 131°09′25.88″E
- Population: 1,730 (2016 census)
- Postcode(s): 0836
- Location: 44.2 km (27 mi) from Darwin; 24.3 km (15 mi) from Palmerston
- LGA(s): Litchfield Municipality
- Territory electorate(s): Goyder
- Federal division(s): Solomon
Suburbs around Herbert:
Koolpinyah	Koolpinyah	Black Jungle
Girraween	Herbert	Black Jungle
Humpty Doo	Humpty Doo; Lambells Lagoon	Lambells Lagoon
- Footnotes: Adjoining suburbs

Herbert is an outer rural locality of Darwin. It is 44 km South - east of Darwin. Its Local Government Area is the Litchfield Municipality. The suburb is mostly a rural area. It is situated in the vicinity of Benham and Benjamin Lagoons. It was previously considered as part of Humpty Doo.
