= Lambells Lagoon =

Lambells Lagoon Darwin, Northern Territory
- Coordinates: 12.588185°S 131.184105°E
- Population: 347 (2016 census)
- Postcode(s): 0822
- Location: 47.6 km (30 mi) from Darwin City; 27.7 km (17 mi) from Palmerston
- LGA(s): Litchfield Municipality
- Territory electorate(s): Goyder
- Federal division(s): Solomon
Suburbs around Lambells Lagoon:
Herbert	Black Jungle; Koolpinyah	Koolpinyah
Humpty Doo; Wak Wak	Lambells Lagoon	Koolpinyah; Middle Point
Wak Wak	Wak Wak	Wak Wak
- Footnotes: Adjoining suburbs

Lambells Lagoon is an outer suburban area in Darwin, Australia. It is 47 km east of the Darwin CBD. Its Local Government Area is the Litchfield Municipality. The suburb is mostly a rural area, on the fringe of Metropolitan Darwin. In the most recent Australian census, the population of Lambells Lagoon was 347.

== Demographics ==
In the 2016 Census, there were 347 people in Lambells Lagoon. 46.6% of people were born in Australia and 46.9% of people spoke only English at home. The most common response for religion was No Religion at 36.3%.
