= Shoal Bay, Northern Territory =

Suburb in Northern Territory, Australia

Shoal Bay
- Suburb
- Interactive map of Shoal Bay
- Coordinates: 12°21′57″S 131°03′17″E
- Country: Australia
- State: Northern Territory
- City: Darwin
- LGA: Litchfield Municipality
- Location: 20 km (12 mi) E of Darwin
- Established: 4 April 2007

Government
  - Territory electorate: Nelson
  - Federal division: Lingiari

Population
  - Total: 0 (2016 census)
- Time zone: UTC+9:30 (ACST)
- Postcode: 0830
- Mean max temp: 32.1 °C (89.8 °F)
- Mean min temp: 23.2 °C (73.8 °F)
- Annual rainfall: 1,725.1 mm (67.92 in)
Suburbs around Shoal Bay
Beagle Gulf	Beagle Gulf; Murrumujuk	Murrumujuk
Micket Creek; Knuckey Lagoon	Shoal Bay	Koolpinyah
Knuckey Lagoon	Holtze; Howard Springs	Koolpinyah

Shoal Bay is a locality in the Northern Territory of Australia located about 20 kilometres (12 mi) east of the territory capital of Darwin.

The locality is named after the nearby bay which was named in 1839 by Commander Wickham and Lieutenant Stokes during HMS Beagle's third survey expedition.

The 2016 Australian census which was conducted in August 2016 reports that Shoal Bay had no people living within its boundaries.

Shoal Bay is located within the federal division of Lingiari, the territory electoral division of Nelson and the local government area of the Litchfield Municipality.
