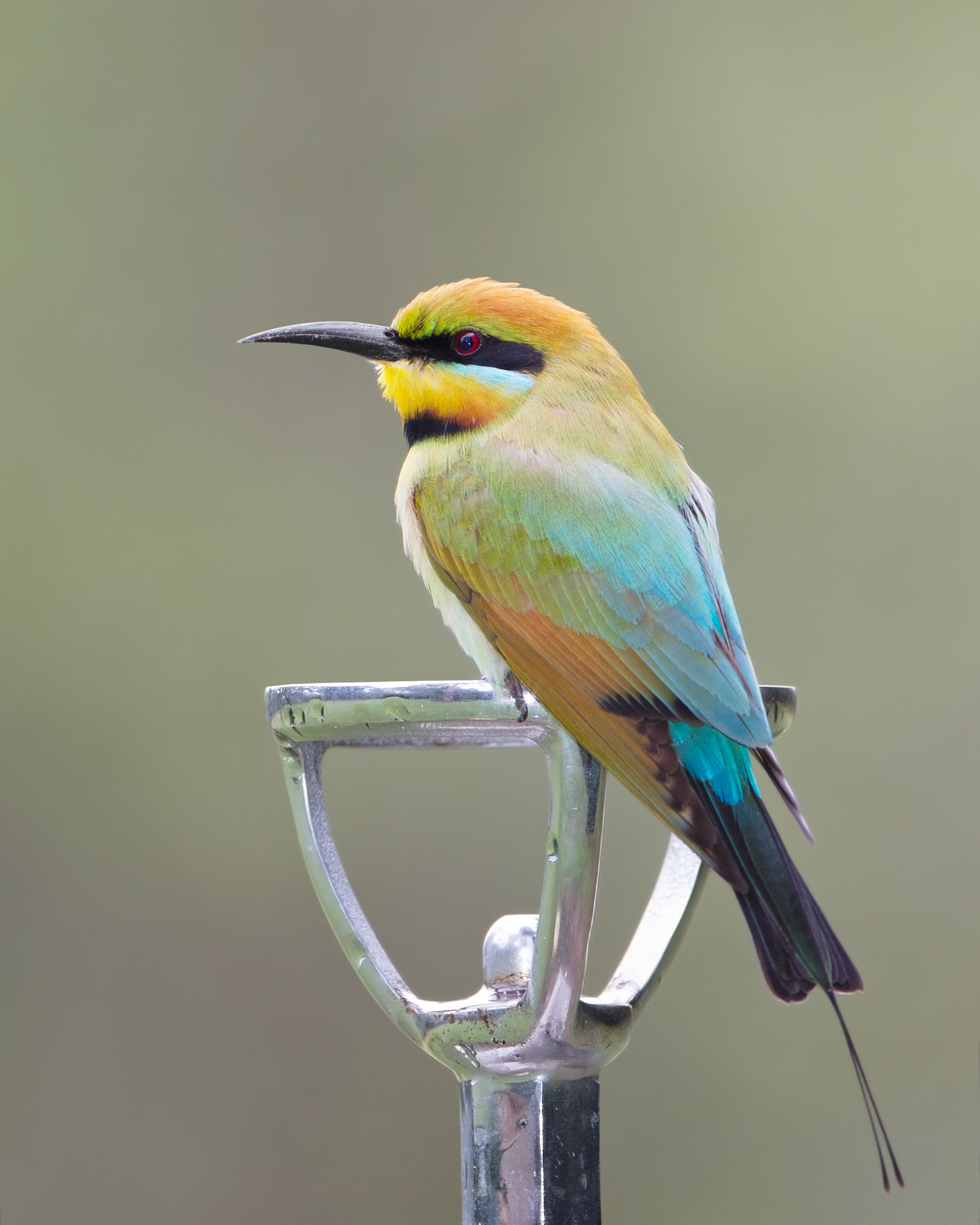
- Perching on a bubbler in Cairns, Queensland, Australia

Conservation status
- Least Concern (IUCN 3.1)

Scientific classification
- Kingdom: Animalia
- Phylum: Chordata
- Class: Aves
- Order: Coraciiformes
- Family: Meropidae
- Genus: Merops
- Species: M. ornatus

Binomial name
- Merops ornatus Latham, 1801

= Rainbow bee-eater =

Species of bird

The rainbow bee-eater (Merops ornatus) is a bird species in the bee-eater family Meropidae.

== Taxonomy ==
The rainbow bee-eater is the only species of bee-eater found in Australia and is monotypic, meaning it has no accepted subspecies. Its closest relative is most likely the olive bee-eater (Merops superciliosus) of southern and eastern Africa, but molecular phylogenetic analysis places the rainbow bee-eater as closest relative with the European bee-eater (M. apiaster). It was first described by John Latham in 1801. The generic name is Ancient Greek merops which means 'bee-eater' and the specific epithet is Latin ornatus 'ornate, adorned'.

== Description ==
Rainbow bee-eaters are brilliantly coloured birds that grow to be 23–28 cm (9.1–11.0 in) in length, including the elongated tail feathers, and weighing 20–33 g (0.71–1.16 oz). The upper back and wings are green, and the lower back and under-tail coverts are bright blue. The undersides of the wings and primary flight feathers are rufous to copper with green edges and tipped with black, and the tail is black to deep violet. The rainbow bee-eater's two central tail feathers are longer than the other tail feathers, and are longer in the male rainbow bee-eaters than in the females. The crown of the head, the stomach and breast, and the throat are pale yellow-orange, and it has a black crescent-shaped gorget and a black stripe, edged with blue, extending through its bright red eye. They have small, syndactylous feet (i.e., with toes partly united). The juvenile has overall duller plumage, a greener crown, and lacks throat bands and tail streamers.

== Distribution and habitat ==
Rainbow bee-eaters are a common species and can be found during the summer in forested areas in most of southern Australia, excluding Tasmania. They migrate north during the winter into northern Australia, New Guinea, and some of the southern islands of Indonesia. Vagrants have been recorded on Miyako Island, Japan, and Luidao (Green Island) off south-east Taiwan.

They may be found in open woodlands, beaches, dunes, cliffs, mangroves, and farmlands, and they often visit parks and private gardens.

== Behaviour ==
Like all bee-eaters, rainbow bee-eaters are very social birds. When they are not breeding they roost together in large groups in dense undergrowth or large trees.

=== Vocal behaviour ===
The rainbow bee-eater makes a series of loud, melodious "pir-r-r" calls, characterised by rapid vibrating and high pitch, usually in flight. A softer, slower call is exchanged between perching birds.

=== Nesting ===
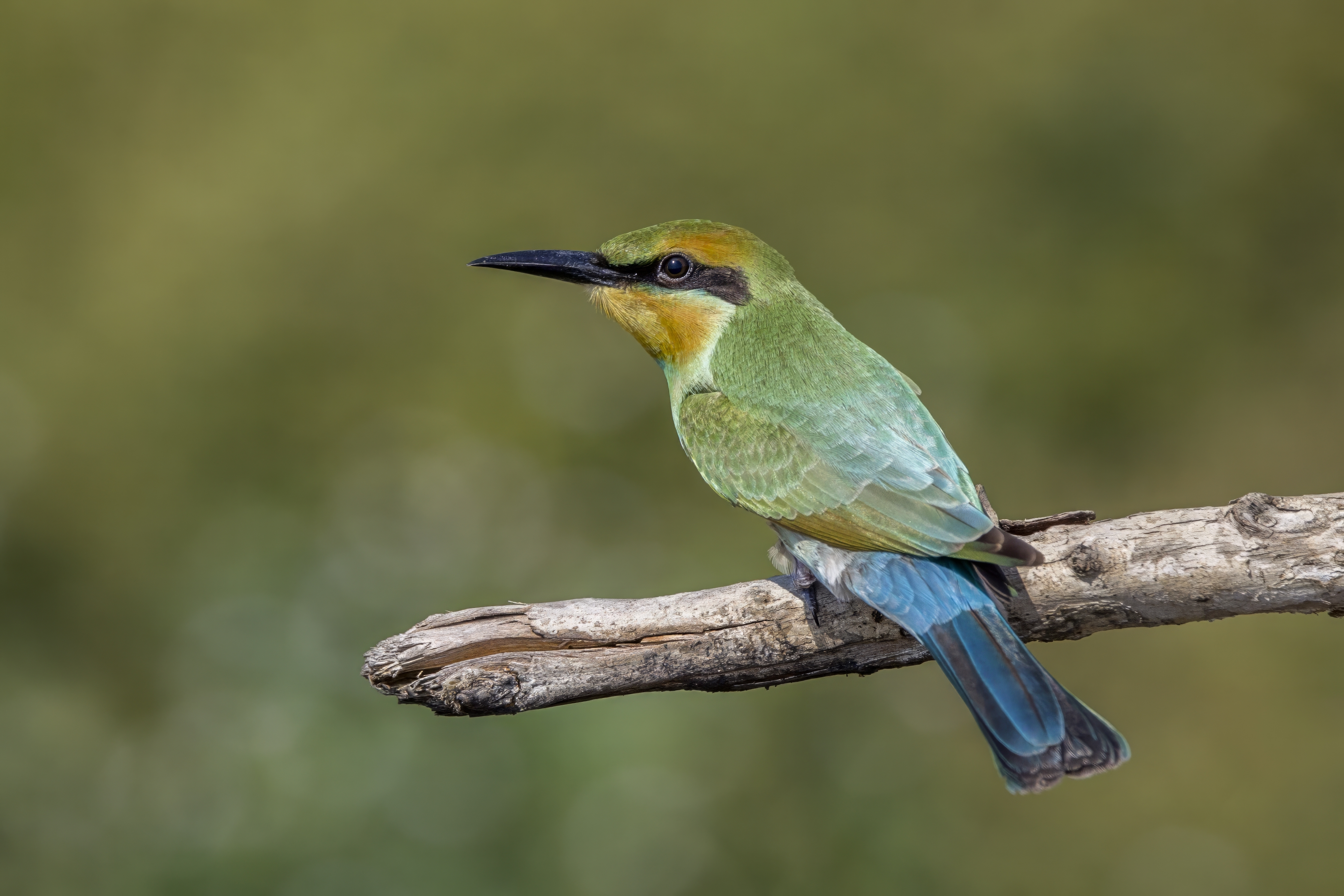
Juvenile, at Fogg Dam, Northern Territory.

Rainbow bee-eaters are ground-nesting birds, like all bee-eaters. Breeding season is before and after the rainy season in the north, and from November to January in the south. Rainbow bee-eaters are believed to mate for life. The male will bring the female insects while she digs the burrow that will be their nest. The bee-eater digs its burrow by balancing on its wings and feet, and digs with its bill, then pushing loose soil backwards with its feet while balancing on its bill. The female bee-eater can dig about 7–8 centimetres down every day. The nest tunnel is very narrow, and the birds' bodies press so tightly against the tunnel walls that when the birds enter and exit their movement acts like a piston, pumping in fresh air and pushing out stale air. Rainbow bee-eaters have also been known to share their nest tunnels with other bee-eaters and sometimes even other species of birds. The female lays between 3 and 7 rounded, translucent white eggs, measuring 24 by 18 mm (0.94 by 0.71 in), which are incubated for about 21 to 24 days until hatching. The young bee-eaters fledge after 28 to 31 days and are fed by both parents, as well as by any other members of the communal group. Cane toads are known to prey on nestlings.

=== Diet ===
Rainbow bee-eaters mostly eat flying insects, but, as their name implies, they have a real taste for bees. Rainbow bee-eaters are always watching for flying insects, and can spot a potential meal up to 45 metres away. Once it spots an insect a bee-eater will swoop down from its perch and catch it in its long, slender, black bill and fly back to its perch. Bee-eaters will then knock their prey against their perch to subdue it. Even though rainbow bee-eaters are actually immune to the stings of bees and wasps, upon capturing a bee they will rub the insect's stinger against their perch to remove it, closing their eyes to avoid being squirted with poison from the ruptured poison sac. Bee-eaters can eat several hundred bees a day, so they are obviously resented by beekeepers, but their damage is generally balanced by their role in keeping pest insects such as locusts and hornets under control.

=== Roe 8 controversy ===
Opponents of the Roe 8 project in Perth, Western Australia, claimed that the rainbow bee-eater migrates to the Beeliar Wetlands, which is in the pathway of the Roe Highway extension. Following the 11 March 2017 election, the incoming Labor Government suspended this project and reclamation work by volunteers has begun.

== Conservation status ==
The rainbow bee-eater is a common, migratory species with a wide distribution and stable population, which is classified as least concern on the IUCN Red List.

== Gallery ==
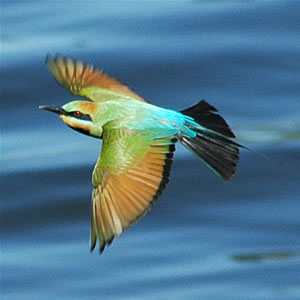
Flying

Rainbow bee-eater sunning, early morning SE Queensland, Australia

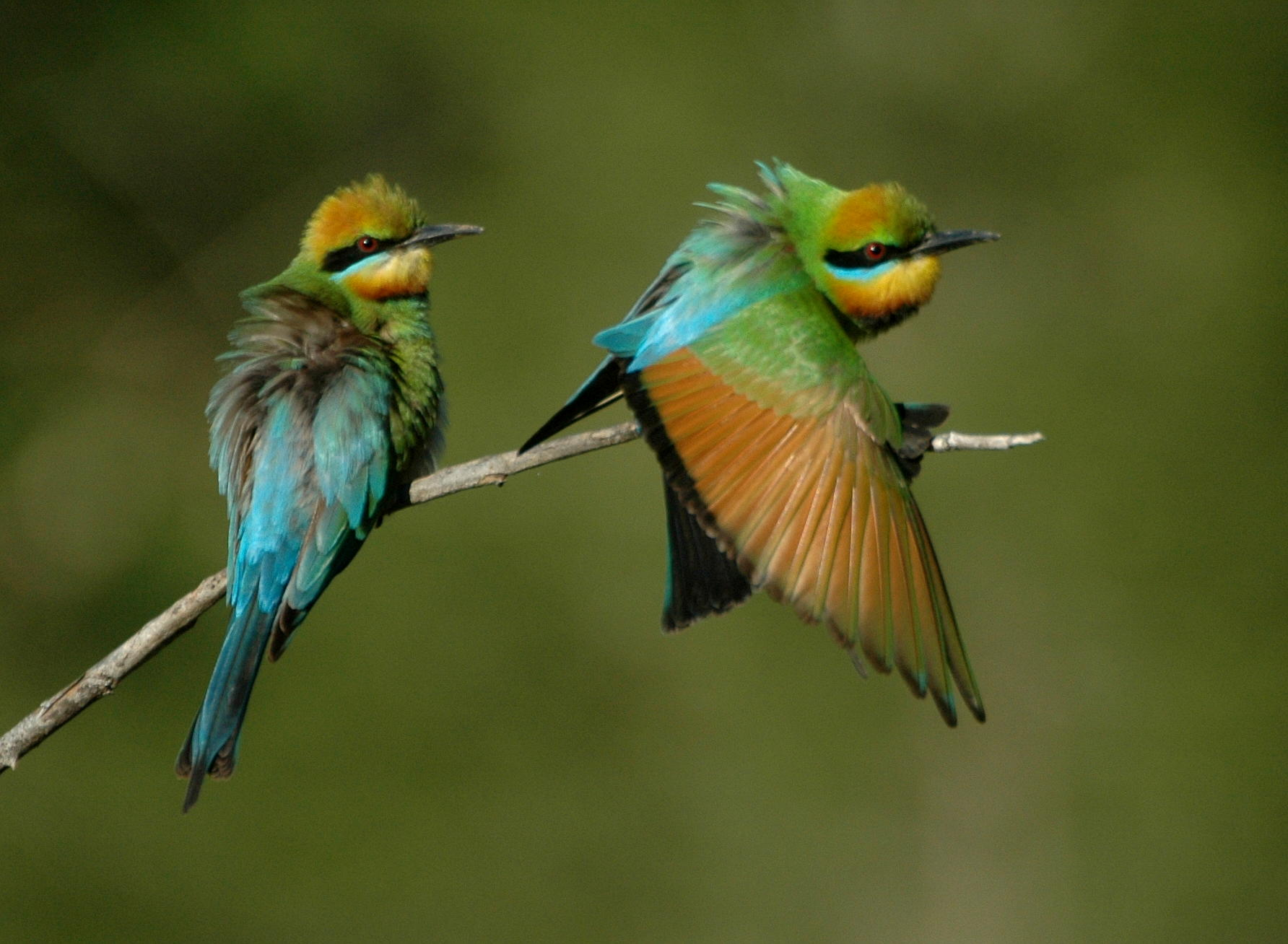
Rainbow bee-eater at Dayboro, SE Queensland, Australia

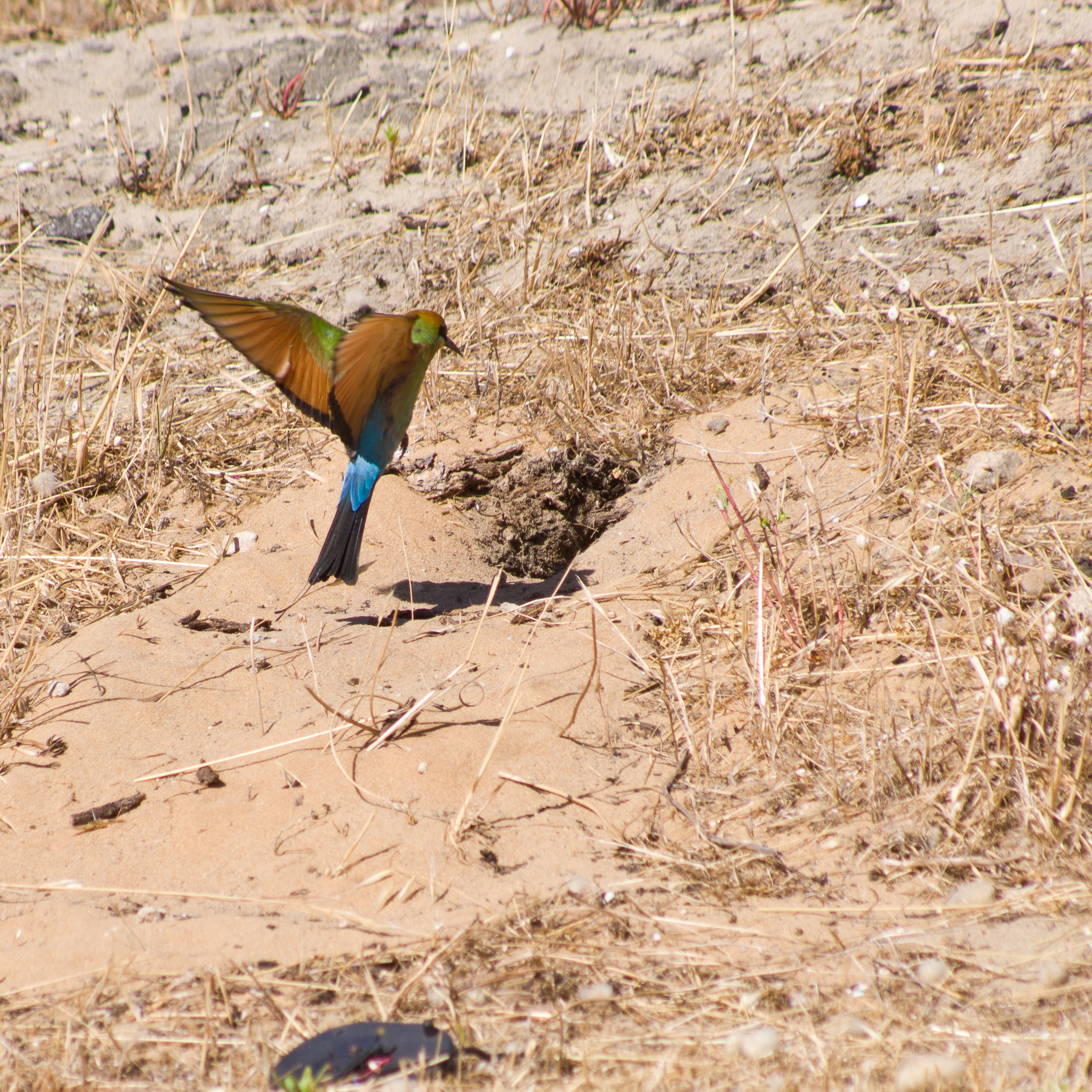
Rainbow bee-eater entering a nesting burrow in the Beeliar Wetlands
