= Marrakai =

- Suburb
- Coordinates: 12°44′46″S 131°28′45″E
- Country: Australia
- State: Northern Territory
- LGA: unincorporated area
- Location: 76 km (47 mi) E of Darwin City
- Established: 4 April 2007

Government
  - Territory electorate: Goyder
  - Federal division: Lingiari

Population
  - Total: 517 (2016 census)
- Time zone: UTC+9:30 (ACST)
- Postcode: 0822
- Mean max temp: 33.1 °C (91.6 °F)
- Mean min temp: 20.9 °C (69.6 °F)
- Annual rainfall: 1,434.5 mm (56.48 in)
Suburbs around Marrakai
Van Diemen Gulf; Hotham	Van Diemen Gulf	Van Diemen Gulf
Hotham; Koolpinyah; Middle Point; Wak Wak; Daly; Manton; Lake Bennett; Coomalie Creek	Marrakai	Point Stuart; Mount Bundey
Coomalie Creek	Margaret River; Mount Bundey	Mount Bundey
- Locations; Adjoining localities

Marrakai is a locality in the Northern Territory of Australia located about 76 kilometres (47 mi) east of the territorial capital of Darwin.

The locality consists of land bounded in part to the west by the Adelaide River, in part to the north by the coastline of Van Diemen Gulf and in part to the east by the Mary River. The locality was named after the Marrakai pastoral station whose name is considered to be an amalgamation of a local Aboriginal word "kie", meaning river, and a corruption of the English word "Mary", usually used as a woman's first name. Its boundaries and name were gazetted on 4 April 2007.

Marrakai is located within the federal division of Lingiari, the territory electoral division of Goyder and the unincorporated areas of the Northern Territory.

The 2016 Australian census reports that Marrakai had a population of 517 people.
