= Micket Creek =

- Suburb
- Interactive map of Micket Creek
- Coordinates: 12°22′08″S 130°57′09″E
- Country: Australia
- State: Northern Territory
- LGA: Litchfield Municipality
- Location: 12 km (7.5 mi) E of Darwin
- Established: 29 October 1997

Government
  - Territory electorate: Nelson
  - Federal division: Lingiari

Population
  - Total: 0 (2016 census)
- Time zone: UTC+9:30 (ACST)
- Postcode: 0822
- Mean max temp: 32.1 °C (89.8 °F)
- Mean min temp: 23.2 °C (73.8 °F)
- Annual rainfall: 1,725.1 mm (67.92 in)
Suburbs around Micket Creek
Beagle Gulf	Beagle Gulf	Beagle Gulf
Buffalo Creek; Holmes	Micket Creek	Shoal Bay
Holmes	Knuckey Lagoon	Shoal Bay
- Locations; Adjoining localities

Micket Creek is a locality in the Northern Territory of Australia located about 12 kilometres (7.5 mi) east of the territory capital of Darwin.

Micket Creek consists of land located on the south coast of Shoal Bay. It is named after Micket Creek, which is a stream flowing through the locality into Shoal Bay and whose name first appears in 1869 in the records associated with the survey of what is now the Darwin hinterland overseen by George Goyder, the Surveyor-General of South Australia. Its boundaries and name were gazetted on 29 October 1997.

The locality contains the Micket Creek Shooting Complex, a facility opened in 1997 to accommodate the needs of four Darwin-based shooting organisations and which is operated by the NT Firearms Council under lease from the Northern Territory Government.

The 2016 Australian census which was conducted in August 2016 reports that Micket Creek had no people living within its boundaries.

Micket Creek is located within the federal division of Lingiari, the territory electoral division of Nelson and within the local government area of the Litchfield Municipality.
