= Knuckey Lagoon =

Knuckey Lagoon Darwin, Northern Territory
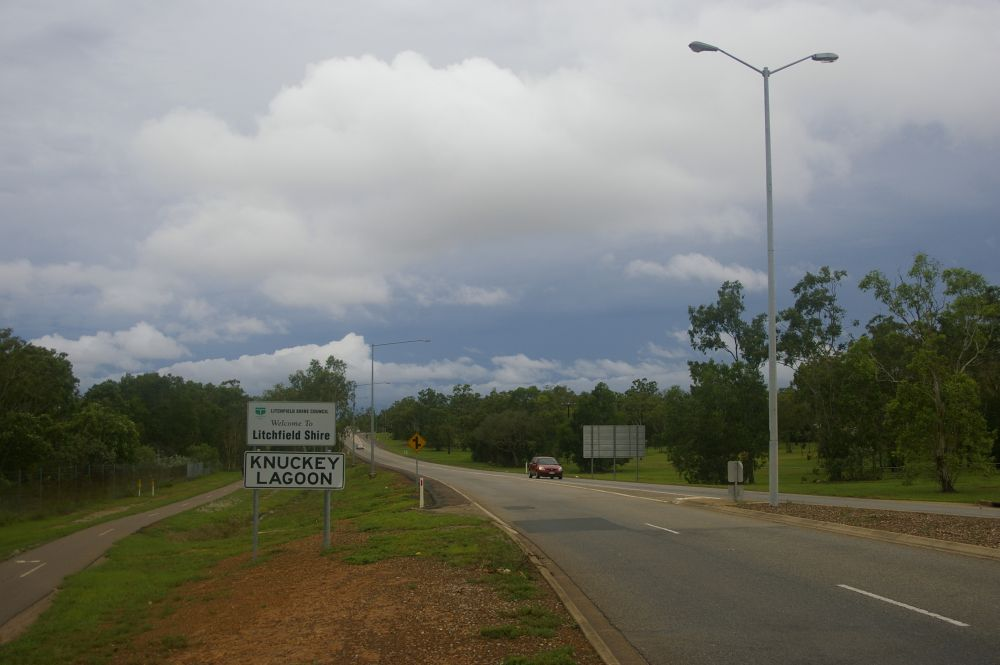

- Coordinates: 12°25′33″S 130°56′32″E
- Population: 413 (2016 census)
- Established: 1869
- Postcode(s): 0828
- Location: 18.2 km (11 mi) from Darwin; 10.1 km (6 mi) from Palmerston
- LGA(s): Litchfield Municipality
- Territory electorate(s): Karama
- Federal division(s): Lingiari
Suburbs around Knuckey Lagoon:
Karama	Holmes; Micket Creek	Shoal Bay
Berrimah	Knuckey Lagoon	Shoal Bay; Holtze
Berrimah	Berrimah; Pinelands; Holtze	Holtze
- Footnotes: Adjoining suburbs

Knuckey Lagoon is an outer suburban area in Darwin. It is 18 kilometres (11 mi) east of the Darwin CBD. Its Local Government Area is the Litchfield Municipality. The suburb is mostly a rural area, on the fringe of Metropolitan Darwin. The area was named by Surveyor General G W Goyder after his Senior Surveyor, Richard Randall Knuckey.

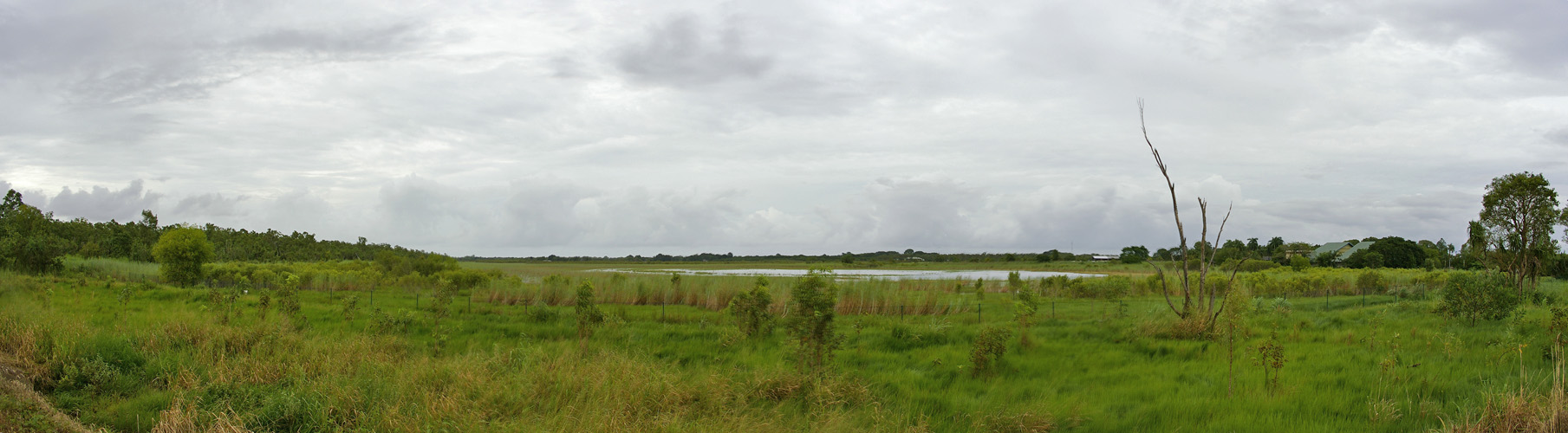
Knuckey Lagoon
