= Humpty Doo Rice Project =

Failed project in Northern Territory, Australia

Rice crop at the Humpty Doo Rice Project in 1958

The Humpty Doo Rice Project, also known as the Humpty Doo Rice Trail, was a failed rice growing project in Humpty Doo, and surrounding areas, in the Northern Territory. The company that undertook this project was Territory Rice Limited and it was once billed as "Australia's rice bowl". It is on the lands of the Limilngan and Wulna peoples.

Parts of the former site of the Humpty Doo Rice Trail are now the Fogg Dam Conservation Reserve and the Harrison Dam Conservation Reserve.

== History ==
Planning for the Humpty Doo Rice Project began in 1953 when Harold Holt, the then Minister for Labour and National Service, met with Allen Chase, an American entrepreneur at a party in Los Angeles. Holt told Chase about the Northern Territory's potential for growing rice and the success that Chinese farmers had in the 1800s and 1926 and encouraged him to invest. The Commonwealth Government, through Holt, wanted to further develop the population of North Australia, following World War II; it also knew that Asia would need rice to feed its growing population. Rice had already been grown successfully at the Ivanhoe Station in Kununurra, Western Australia, however as with other areas in Northern Australia the sustained agricultural production of rice failed.

After this meeting Chase visited Humpty Doo, and the 300,000 hectares of sub-coastal plains that had been set aside for the project and was very impressed by them; he said "[t]his is exactly like the Nile Valley, only it is twice as good!". He then formed a syndicate of investors that included actors and entertainers Art Linkletter, Robert Cummings and Charles Correll.

Together the syndicate began with a $40,000 survey of the area in 1954 and, in November 1955, incorporated as Territory Rice Limited and received the required agricultural leases which spanned from Adelaide River to Arnhem Land.

Early development focused on the leases near Humpty Doo, on what was once Humpty Doo Station, which had previously been used for cattle. In order to begin the project they constructed roads, established a workers village, built a rice mills at Coolalinga and built an airfield. In exchange for their investment, the government built a power line from Darwin to the required sites and the Royal Australian Air Force's construction squadron built the Fogg Dam in 1956 and Harrison Dam in 1958. The government also provided additional capital, local administration and research into rice varieties and growing techniques.

The dams and the associated irrigation systems they built were essential as the project faced constant issues with water as, in the tropical conditions of the Top End, there was often no rain in the dry season and too much during the wet season. One of the early investors, Art Linkletter, when reflecting on the project in 2000, said that he was told the area received 85 inches (215 cms) of rain each year but that:

The question I didn't know to ask was ‘How does the rain come down?’ And I found out it comes down in a week. Which took care of the rice. It went to sea.

— Art Linkletter

Significant amounts of money were spent by both Territory Rice Limited and the government and, to save money, much of the infrastructure (including a 100 tonne bulk storage bin) were constructed using steel from Vestey's Meatworks and military equipment 'left over' after World War II.

Despite this the project struggled financially from its earliest days and rice farming proved to be more difficult than expected. Facing financial pressures, and in an attempt to see whether the project was worthwhile, American businessman Robert McColloch took over management and invested nearly $2,000,000 over the next three years.

Territory Rice Limited entered liquidation, with outstanding debts, in August 1960. Northern Territory politician Jock Nelson called it "the greatest blunder and bungle perpetrated in 51 years of Commonwealth control over the NT" and called for an inquiry into what he called the "rice racket". Nelson also compared the failures of the project and the high expenditure by the government to the earlier failure of the Batchelor Demonstration Farm which had closed in 1919.

Following this liquidation local creditors and farmers formed Adelaide River Limited and Rice Development Proprietary Limited and took control of the assets and debts of the company and hoped to bring their practical experience to the project. These local investors did produce higher rice yields but ceased operations in 1964 due to slow payment for crops, limited government support and not wishing to borrow more money.

The Humpty Doo Rice Project struggled due to a variety of factors and magpie geese are often listed as one of the major issues that the project faced after it was reported that when sowing seeds "[w]ild geese, which swarm in the air, ate the lot" and that an army unit deployed there to assist had to shoot specially made "bomb guns" to scare off the birds. While the geese where an issue many have stated that they were not as much as a concern as they were made out to be and that blaming them was primarily a publicity stunt.

Despite its commercial failure the Humpty Doo Rice Project lead to significant population growth in the area due to the infrastructure put in place and the area it once leased is still farmed, in various capacities.
