= Litchfield Municipality =

Coordinates: 12.4266°S 131.0409°E

Litchfield Council
- Local government area
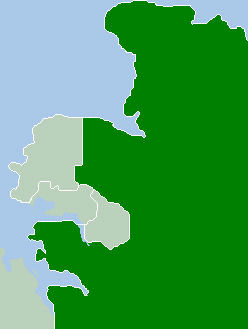

- Interactive map of Litchfield Council
- Country: Australia
- State: Northern Territory
- Region: Outer Metropolitan Darwin
- Established: 1985
- Council seat: Freds Pass

Government
  - Territory electorates: Daly; Goyder; Karama; Nelson
  - Federal divisions: Lingiari; Solomon

Area
  - Total: 2,903 km^{2} (1,121 sq mi)

Population
  - Total: 25,598 (2018)
  - Density: 8.8178/km^{2} (22.838/sq mi)
- Website: Litchfield Council
LGAs around Litchfield Council
Unincorporated Top End Region	Unincorporated Top End Region	Unincorporated Top End Region
Darwin; Palmerston	Litchfield Municipality	Unincorporated Top End Region
Unincorporated Top End Region	Coomalie Shire	Unincorporated Top End Region

The Litchfield Council is a local government area of the Northern Territory of Australia on the eastern and southeastern outskirts of the Darwin-Palmerston urban area. The municipality covers an area of 2,903 square kilometres (1,120.9 sq mi), and was created by the Northern Territory government on 6 September 1985.

== Geography ==
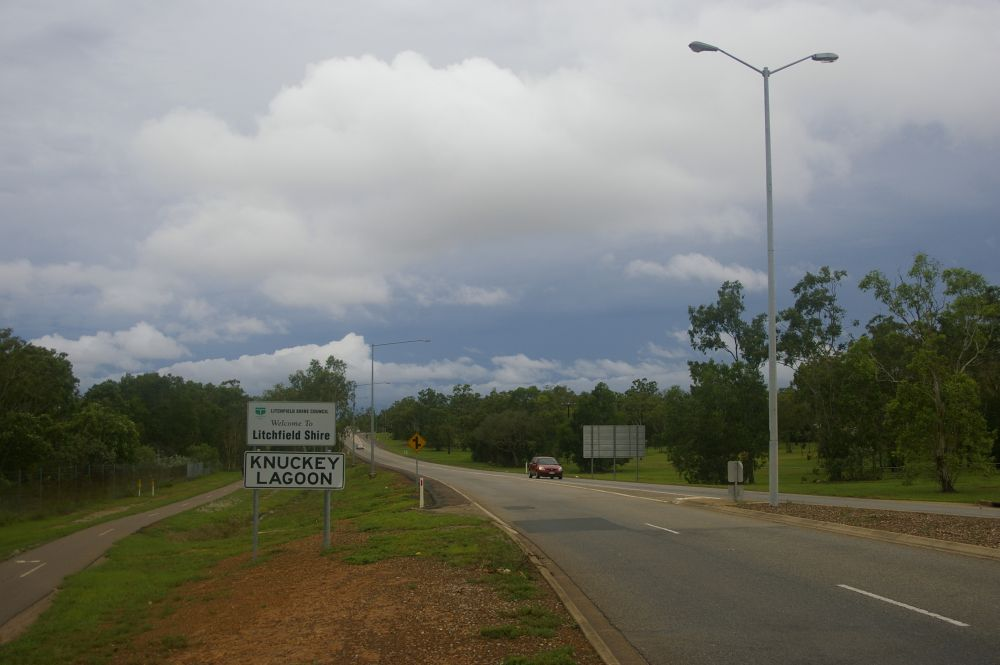
Litchfield Municipality

The Litchfield Municipality is bounded by the Adelaide River to the east, Van Diemen Gulf and the Coomalie Shire in the south and the City of Darwin and City of Palmerston to the northwest. The Stuart and Arnhem Highways run through the Litchfield Municipality. Most of the Municipality is rural or rural-residential in character.

The Aboriginal and Torres Strait Islander population of the shire is 12.4%.

== Current day service provision ==
Despite the first elected body's original ethos of the 3Rs in the early 1980s, Litchfield Council went on, and continues, to provide numerous services beyond Roads, Rubbish and Recreation, including but not limited to;

- Animal Management
- Abandoned Vehicles
- Planning and Development
- Thorak Regional Cemetery (from 1 July 2008)
- Street Lights (from 1 January 2018)
- Waste and Recycling
- Taminmin Library
- Recreation Reserves
- Weed and Roadside Management

These services are available to be used by all residents and visitors to the municipality in carrying out their daily activities.

In addition to its services, Litchfield Council has adopted a Tourism and Events Strategy 2021-2024 https://litchfield.nt.gov.au/system/files/uploads/files/2020/Litchfield%20Council%20Tourism%20and%20Events%20Strategy%20-%20FINAL.pdf and, in its Municipal Plan 2021-22, committed to develop a youth strategy and action plan https://litchfield.nt.gov.au/system/files/uploads/files/2021/Litchfield%20Municipal%20Plan%202021-22-online.pdf

== History ==
The original inhabitants of the Litchfield area were the Larrakia, Wulna (or Djerimanga) and Djowei Aboriginal people. The arrival of European settlers dates from 1864. Litchfield is named after Frederick Henry Litchfield who with William Patrick Auld was a member of an early survey and settlement party and who explored areas of the Northern Territory from Escape Cliffs in Van Diemen Gulf to the Daly River. Some growth took place during the 1870s and 1880s, after the construction of the Overland Telegraph Line. There was more substantial growth during the post-war years, especially during the 1970s.

The Litchfield Shire was proclaimed by an Act of the NT Parliament on 6 September 1985. On 7 December 1985 an election was held to elect the first Council composed of a Shire President and four Councillors each representing a ward – North, South, East and Central.

This first elected body formulated a series of objectives under which Council was to operate. The objectives were based upon the provision of services in what is traditionally known as the 3Rs (Roads, Rubbish and Recreation) and on the principle of contracting out the provision of these services. The level of services under these functions were to be commensurate with a philosophy of low rates.

In 2008 Litchfield Shire removed Shire in its name due to the new Local Government Act 2008, which saw changes in the structure of local government across the Northern Territory.

In 2015 the entire Litchfield council and mayor Allan McKay was sacked by then NT Local Government Minister Bess Price amid allegations of bullying, misuse of funds and budget blow-outs. Allan McKay while serving as mayor had previously received a no-entry order and had been banned from council property after being accused of harassing council staff and fellow councilors.

In the subsequent election in November 2015, former local primary school principal Maree Bredhauer was elected as Mayor out of a field of eight candidates.

Consistent with its legislative requirements under the Local Government Act 2008, Council undertook an electoral review in May/June 2020, with a formal recommendation put forward to the Minister for Local Government, Housing and Community Development, for the Litchfield Council area to be divided into three (3) wards, North, South, and Central. These new boundaries came into effect on 16 July 2021.

Doug Barden, was elected in the 2021 general election held in August. There is a growing tension between zoning of rural blocks into suburban size blocks, such as in Howard Springs. This is being inflamed by a rising population post-COVID into the Territory who require housing as opposed to residents who settled due to the rural lifestyle.

Rachael Wright was elected Mayor of Litchfield at the 2025 local government election, after serving as a North Ward Councillor from 2021 to 2025. A long-term Territorian, she has lived in the rural area for more than 40 years and comes from a large, multigenerational family with strong local connections. Her seven siblings all grew up in the Territory, and her elderly parents also live in the rural area.

A mother of three children who attend schools within the municipality, Wright has longstanding community ties through her involvement with Freds Pass Reserve and her children’s participation in rugby league with the Bears and rugby union with the Swampdogs. During her term as a councillor, she championed community initiatives, including establishing the Litchfield Community Library in Coolalinga, and advocated for improved community infrastructure and keeping council rates low.

She is also Chief Executive Officer of Helping People Achieve (HPA), a Northern Territory charity providing disability services and operating social enterprises. Before joining HPA, Wright was a senior executive at St Vincent de Paul Society NT, overseeing aged care, emergency relief, homelessness, community housing and transport services. Before that, she held a senior executive role at Carers NT, having previously served as a senior director at the Northern Territory Aboriginal Investment Corporation, where she helped establish the organisation from the ground up. These appointments followed 17 years in senior Northern Territory Government roles.

== Localities ==
Localities within the boundary of the Municipality include:

Outer Darwin	Western Rural	Eastern Rural
Bees Creek; Coolalinga; Freds Pass; Girraween; Holtze; Howard Springs; Humpty Doo; Knuckey Lagoon; McMinns Lagoon; Micket Creek; Noonamah; Virginia	Berry Springs; Blackmore; Channel Island; Darwin River; Fly Creek; Livingstone; Southport; Tumbling Waters; Weddell; Wickham	Acacia Hills; Black Jungle; Daly; Glyde Point; Gunn Point; Herbert; Hughes; Koolpinyah; Lambells Lagoon; Lloyd Creek; Manton; Middle Point; Murrumujuk; Shoal Bay; Wak Wak

The majority of localities within the Municipality were gazetted on 29 October 1997. Herbert was gazetted on 15 July 1998 while Channel Island and Wickham were gazetted on 21 April 2004. On 4 April 2007, the localities of Glyde Point, Gunn Point, Koolpinyah, Shoal Bay, Weddell and Wak Wak were created and the boundaries of the localities of Blackmore and Murrumujuk were amended.

== Population ==
In the 2021 census, the Litchfield Municipality had a population of 21,411 with 39.1% describing their ancestry as Australian. This is followed by 34.6% describing their ancestry as English, 9.2% Irish, 8.9% Scottish and 7.2% Australian Aboriginal. 77.0% of Litchfield residents were born in Australia, followed by 3.1% in England, 1.8% in New Zealand, 0.7% in the Philippines, 0.7% in Thailand and 0.6% in Vietnam. 79.0% spoke only English at home followed by the next most common languages: 0.7% Vietnamese, 0.6% Thai, 0.5% Greek, 0.4% Mandarin and 0.4% German.

Historical population
Year	Pop.	±%
1986	7,410	—
1991	9,746	+31.5%
1996	13,858	+42.2%
2001	16,086	+16.1%
2006	17,461	+8.5%
2011	18,994	+8.8%
2021	22,879	+20.5%

== Council presidents ==
- John Maley (1985–1996)
- Gerry Wood (1996–2001)
- Mary Walshe (2001–2012)

== Mayors ==
- Alan McKay (2012 – 2015)
- Maree Bredhauer (2015 - 2021)
- Doug Barden (2021 - 2025)
- Rachael Wright (September 2025 - present)

== Council - current composition ==
The city of Litchfield is divided into 3 wards each electing two councillors, as well as a directly elected Mayor.

Wards and councillors
Ward	Councillor	Party	Notes
Mayor	Rachael Wright	Independent	
Central	Kevin Harlan	Independent	
Central	Pauline Cass	Independent	
North	Daisy Crawford	Independent	
North	Plaxy QF Purich	Independent	
South	Emma Sharp	Independent	
South	Kris Civitarese	Independent	
