= Holmes, Northern Territory =

Holmes
- Suburb
- Interactive map of Holmes
- Coordinates: 12°23′15″S 130°55′26″E
- Country: Australia
- State: Northern Territory
- LGA: City of Darwin
- Established: 4 April 2007

Government
  - Territory electorate: Karama
  - Federal division: Solomon

Population
  - Total: 0 (2016 census)
- Time zone: UTC+9:30 (ACST)
- Postcode: 0812
- Mean max temp: 32.0 °C (89.6 °F)
- Mean min temp: 23.2 °C (73.8 °F)
- Annual rainfall: 1,725.1 mm (67.92 in)
Suburbs around Holmes
Leanyer	Buffalo Creek	Micket Creek
Leanyer; Karama	Holmes	Micket Creek; Knuckeys Lagoon
Berrimah; Knuckeys Lagoon	Knuckeys Lagoon	Knuckeys Lagoon

Holmes is a suburb in the Northern Territory of Australia located in Darwin. It is on the traditional Country and waterways of the Larrakia people.

Holmes is located at the eastern end of the Darwin urban area with its south-westerly corner being located near the intersection of the major roads of McMillans Road and Vanderlin Drive. Its southern end includes the protected area, the Holmes Jungle Nature Park, while its northern end includes the Shoal Bay Waste Management Facility, the waste management facility operated by the City of Darwin.

Holmes’ name is derived from Holmes Jungle, an area of uncleared vegetation now located within the suburb’s boundary, and ultimately from Felix Holmes, a resident of the Northern Territory during the 1920s and 1930s and who is described by one source as a “prominent NT citizen”. Holmes owned businesses including a “butchery, ice works, cordial factory and power station” and also “ran cattle in the (Holmes) Jungle.” The suburb’s boundary and name were gazetted on 4 April 2007.

The 2016 Australian census which was conducted in August 2016 reports that Holmes had no people living within its boundaries.

Holmes is located within the federal division of Solomon, the territory electoral division of Karama and the municipality of the City of Darwin.
