= Humpty Doo Hotel =

The Humpty Doo Hotel
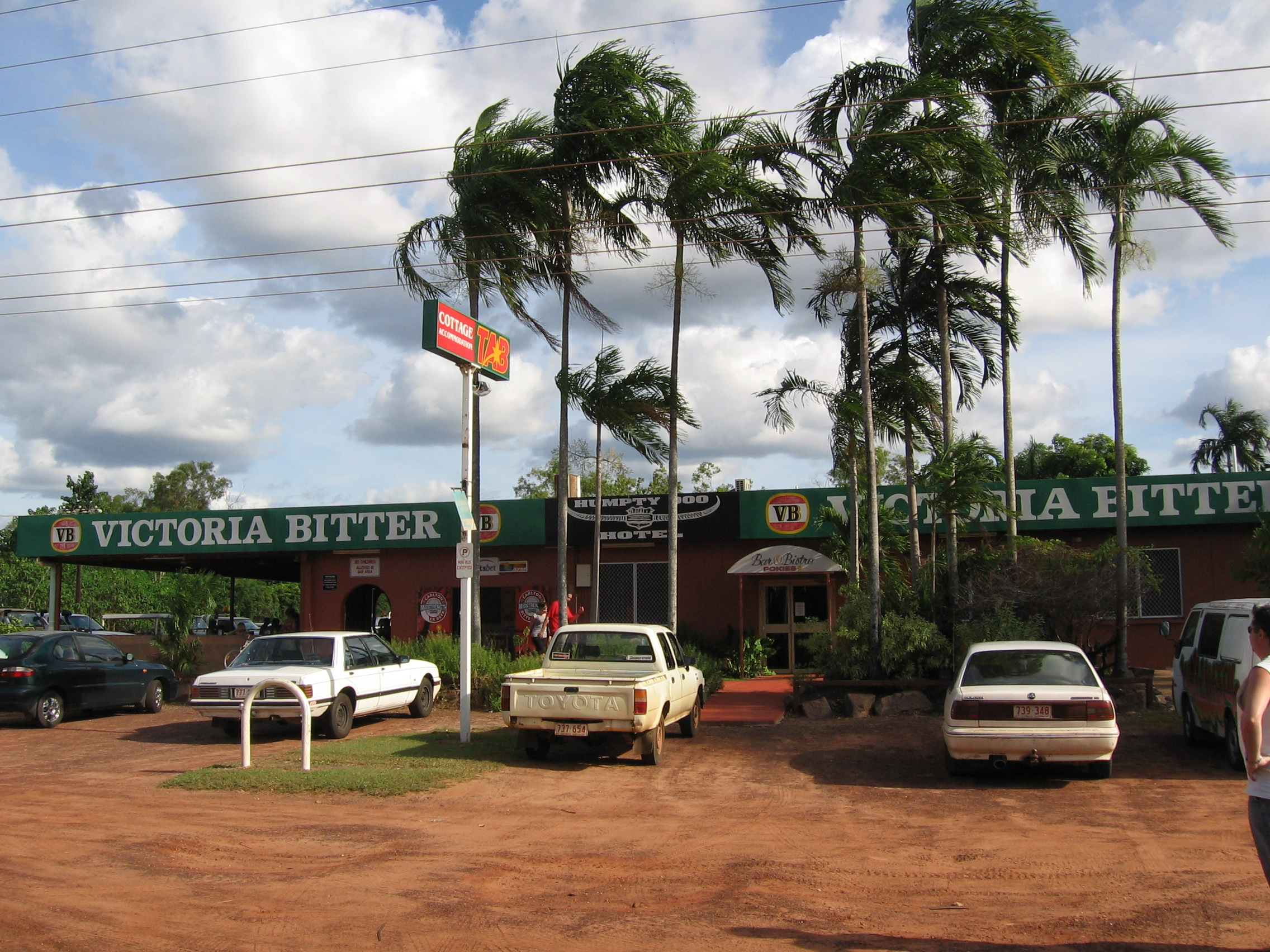

General information
- Coordinates: 12.57853°S 131.12861°E
- Opened: 1964

The Humpty Doo Hotel, built in 1971, is believed to be one of Northern Territory's longest continually licensed premises.

The Humpty Doo Hotel is well known and features in several bush ballads, including "The Man from Humpty Doo" by Ted Egan and Slim Dusty's "Humpty Doo Waltz". It opened in 1971, survived Cyclone Tracy in 1974 and has since become a local icon. In addition to comfortable visitor accommodation, the hotel features a bar area with open walls, a concrete floor and an iron roof. Local live music acts regularly perform here.

== See also ==
- List of pubs in Australia
