= Girraween, Northern Territory =

Girraween Darwin, Northern Territory
- Coordinates: 12°31′27″S 131°05′33″E
- Population: 1,641 (2016 census)
- Postcode(s): 0836
- Location: 35.7 km (22 mi) from Darwin; 15.8 km (10 mi) from Palmerston
- LGA(s): Litchfield Municipality
- Territory electorate(s): Nelson
- Federal division(s): Lingiari
Suburbs around Girraween:
Howard Springs	Howard Springs	Howard Springs
Howard Springs; McMinns Lagoon	Girraween	Koolpinyah; Herbert
McMinns Lagoon	McMinns Lagoon; Humpty Doo	Humpty Doo
- Footnotes: Adjoining suburbs

Girraween is an outer semi-rural area in Darwin. It is 35 km southeast of the Darwin CBD. Its local government area is the Litchfield Municipality.
