= Fogg Dam Conservation Reserve =

Protected area in the Northern Territory, Australia

- IUCN category V (protected landscape/seascape)
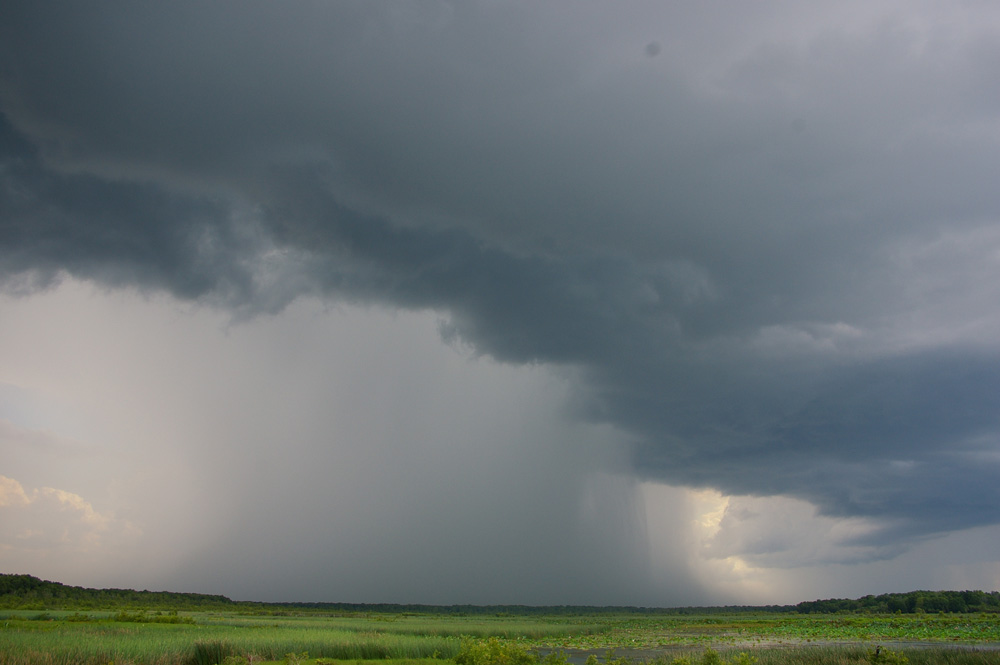
- Fogg Dam during the Build-Up

- Location within Northern Territory
- Location: Northern Territory, Middle Point
- Nearest city: Humpty Doo
- Coordinates: 12°33′59″S 131°18′5″E
- Area: 37.08 km^{2} (14.32 sq mi)
- Established: 13 August 1982
- Visitors: 63,200 (in 2017)
- Governing body: Parks and Wildlife Commission of the Northern Territory
- Website: Official website

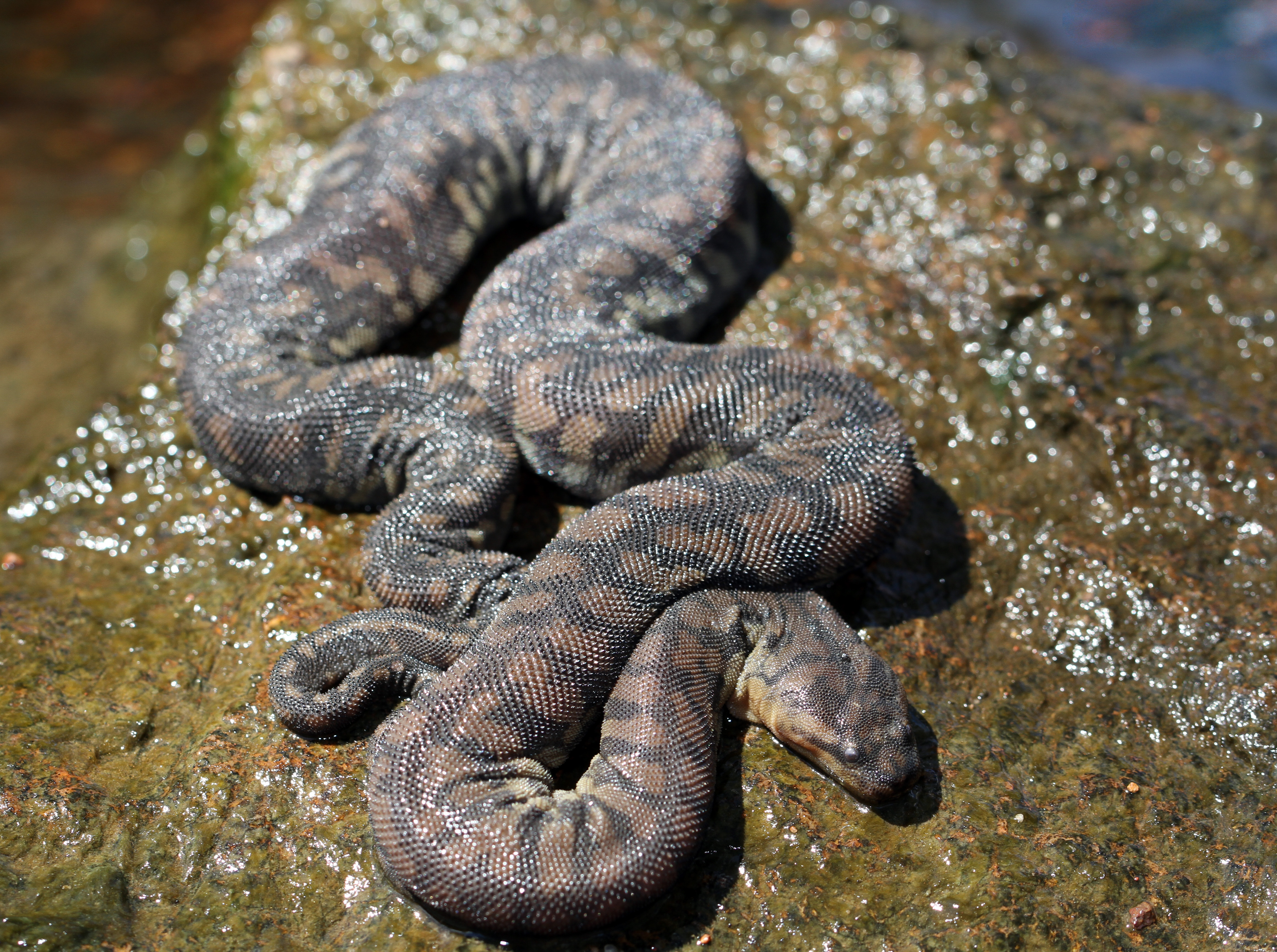
File snake at Fogg Dam

The Fogg Dam Conservation Reserve is a protected area consisting of a wetland area approximately 70 km (43 mi) east of Darwin in the Northern Territory of Australia. It lies within the Adelaide and Mary River Floodplains, which is an Important Bird Area.

It attracts a wide range of local and migratory water birds and other wildlife including one of the largest populations of snakes within Australia (including the water python and death adder), and includes several raised observation platforms.

Saltwater crocodiles (Crocodylus porosus) and freshwater crocodiles (Crocodylus johnstoni) can be seen at Fogg Dam all year around. Fogg Dam is open 24hr/365days but not preferable at night due to the dangers of crocodiles.

== Species lists ==
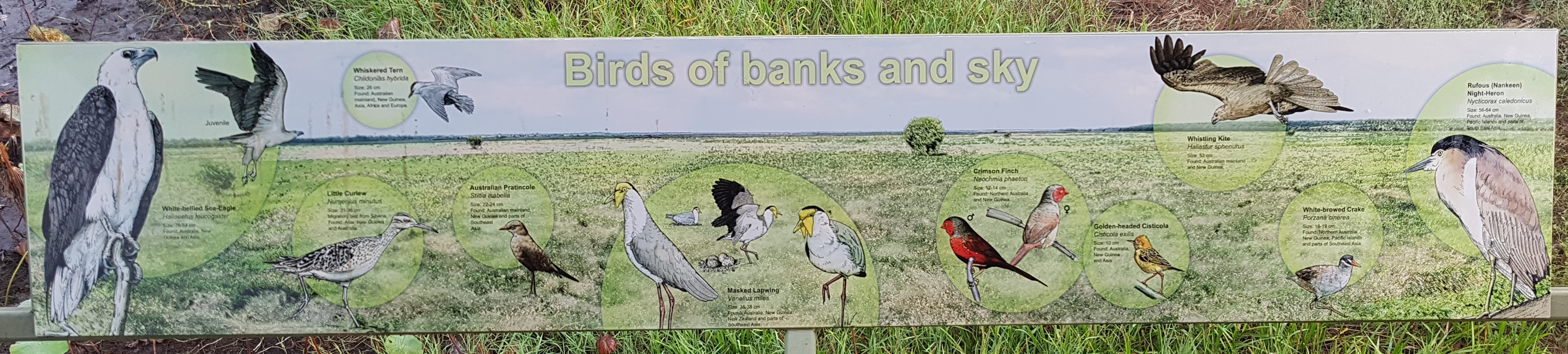
Birds of Banks and Sky

Birds of the Banks and Sky see Photo above
Type	Common name	Scientific name
Finches	Crimson Finch	Neochmia phaeton
Marshbirds	White-browed Crake	Poliolimnas cinereus
Raptors	White bellied Sea Eagle	Haliaeetus leucogaster
Raptors	Whistling Kite	Haliastur sphenurus
Seabirds	Whiskered Tern	Chlidonias hybrida or Chlidonias hybridus
Waders	Little Curlew	Numenius minutus
Waders	Australian Pratincole	Stiltia isabella
Waders	Masked Lapwing	Vanellus miles
Warblers	Golden-headed Cisticola	Cisticola exilis
Waterbirds	Nankeen Night Heron	Nycticorax caledonicus

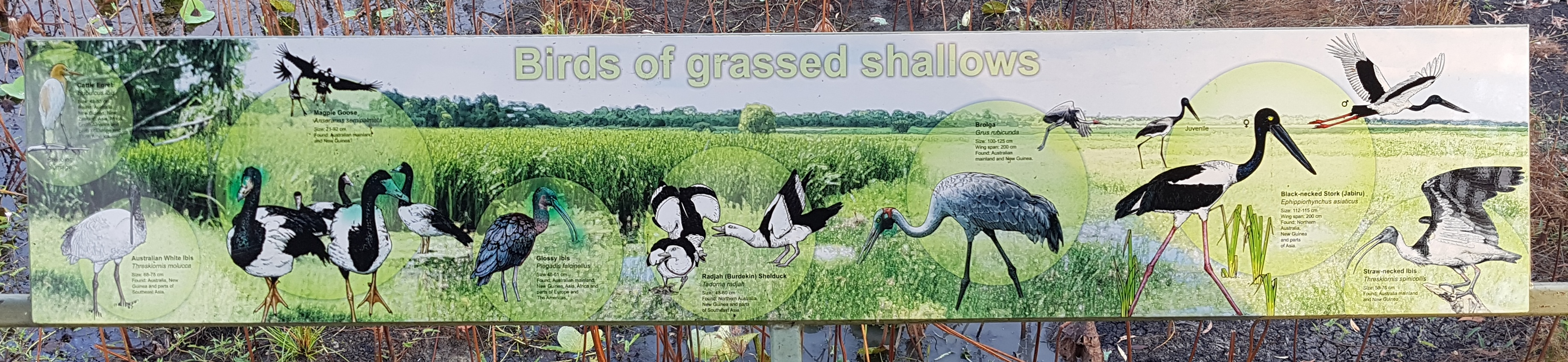
Birds of Grassed Shallows

Birds of the Grassed Shallows see Photo above
Type	Common name	Scientific name
Waterbirds	B Cattle Egret	Ardea ibis
Waterbirds	Australian White Ibis	Threskiornis moluccus
Waterbirds	Glossy Ibis	Plegadis falcinellus
Waterbirds	Straw-necked Ibis	Threskiornis spinicollis
Waterbirds	Black-necked Stork or Jabiru	Ephippiorhynchus asiaticus
Waterbirds	Brolga	Grus rubicunda
Waterfowl	Magpie Geese	Anseranas semipalmata

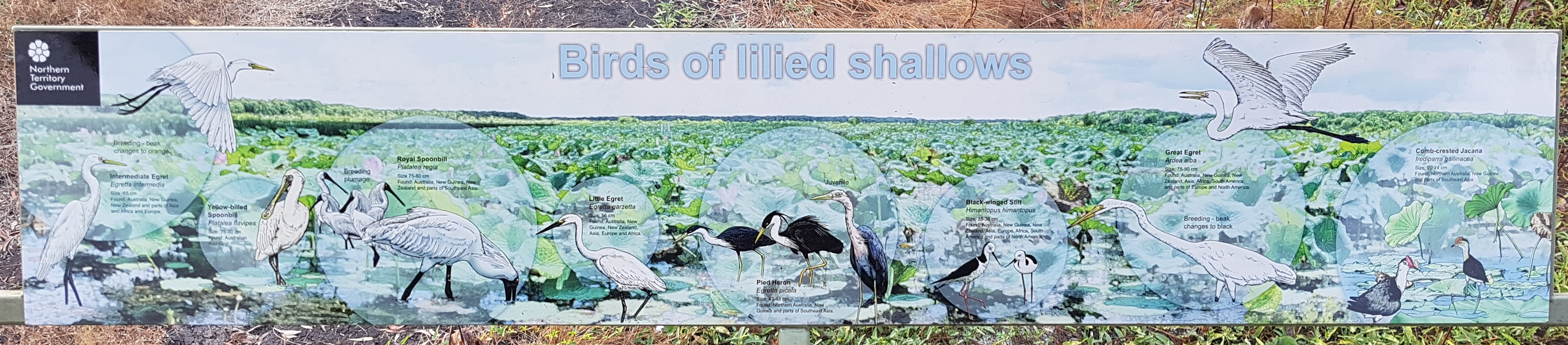
Birds of Lilied Shallows

Birds of the Lilied Shallows see Photo above
Type	Common name	Scientific name
Marshbirds	Black-winged Stilt, Common Stilt, or Pied Stilt	Himantopus himantopus
Marshbirds	Comb-crested Jacana or Lilytrotter	Irediparra gallinacea
Waterbirds	Intermediate Egret	Mesophoyx intermedia
Waterbirds	Royal Spoonbill	Platalea regia
Waterbirds	Yellow-billed Spoonbill	Platalea flavipes
Waterbirds	Little Egret or Lesser Egret	Egretta garzetta immaculata
Waterbirds	Pied Heron	Ardea picata or Egretta picata
Waterbirds	Great Egret or Great White	Ardea alba

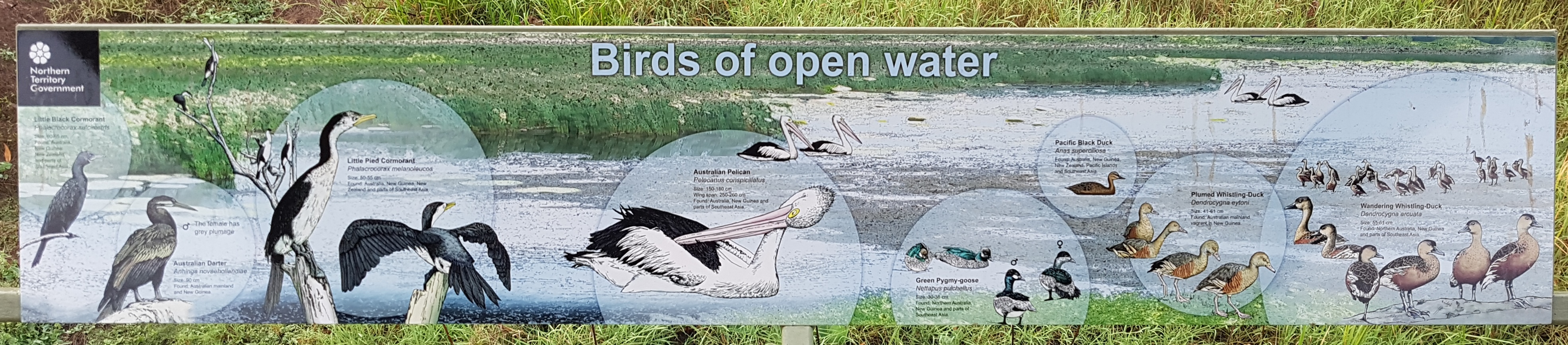
Birds of Open Water

Birds of the Open Water (01).jpg see Photo above
Type	Common name	Scientific name
Seabird	Little Black Cormorant	Phalacrocorax sulcirostris
Seabird	Little Pied Cormorant	Phalacrocorax melanoleucos
Seabird	Darter	Anhinga melanogaster
Seabird	Australian Pelican	Pelecanus conspicillatus
Waterfowl	Green Pygmy-goose	Nettapus pulchellus
Waterfowl	Plumed Whistling Duck	Dendrocygna eytoni
Waterfowl	Wandering Whistling Duck	Dendrocygna arcuata
Waterfowl	Pacific Black Duck	Anas superciliosa

Birds of the Paperbarks see Photo above
Type	Common name	Scientific name
Koel	Eastern Koel	Eudynamys orientalis
Bee-eater	Rainbow Bee-eater	Merops ornatus
Honeyeater	Blue-faced Honeyeater	Entomyzon cyanotis
A Honeyeater	Dusky Honeyeater	Myzomela obscura
A Honeyeater	Rufous-banded Honeyeater	Conopophila albogularis
Honeyeater	Rufous-throated Honeyeater	Conopophila rufogularis
Wagtail	Willie Wagtail	Rhipidura leucophrys
Kingfisher	Forest Kingfisher	Todiramphus macleayii
Chat	Yellow Chat	Epthianura crocea
