= Rakula, Northern Territory =

Rakula Northern Territory
- Coordinates: 13°01′19″S 130°24′50″E
- Population: 59 (2021 census)
- Established: 4 April 2007
- Postcode(s): 0822
- Time zone: ACST (UTC+9:30)
- Location: 72 km (45 mi) SW of Darwin City
- LGA(s): Unincorporated area
- Territory electorate(s): Daly
- Federal division(s): Lingiari
Mean max temp	Mean min temp	Annual rainfall
31.9 °C; 89 °F	23.3 °C; 74 °F	1,778.3 mm 70 in
Suburbs around Rakula:
Timor Sea	Dundee Beach; Dundee Forest; Dundee Downs; Bynoe; Charlotte	Collett Creek
Timor Sea	Rakula	Finniss Valley; Litchfield Park
Timor Sea	Nemarluk; Daly River	Litchfield Park
- Footnotes: Locations; Adjoining localities

Rakula is a locality in the Northern Territory of Australia, located about 72 kilometres (45 mi) south-west of the territorial capital of Darwin.

Rakula consists of land located in the south-west corner of the cadastral division of the County of Palmerston and which adjoins the coastline with the Timor Sea to the west. This includes parts of the hundreds of Glyde and Milne on the locality’s northern side and parts of the hundreds of Hart and Blyth on its eastern side. Its name is derived from a local aboriginal word which means "country". Its boundaries and name were gazetted on 4 April 2007.

The Finniss River flows through and reaches the sea within Rakula. The Peron Islands are also located within Rakula.

The 2016 Australian census which was conducted in August 2016 reports that Rakula had 99 people living within its boundaries.

Rakula is located within the federal division of Lingiari, the territory electoral division of Daly and within the unincorporated areas of the Northern Territory.
