= Cox Peninsula Road =

Road in the Northern Territory of Australia

Cox Peninsula Road Northern Territory
- Cox Peninsula Road (green and black)

General information
- Type: Road
- Length: 79.5 km (49 mi)
- Route number(s): B34
- Former route number: State Route 34

Major junctions
- Southeast end: Stuart Highway (National Highway 1 / A1), Noonamah
- Northwest end: Charles Point Road, Cox Peninsula

Location(s)
- Major suburbs: Berry Springs, Tumbling Waters, Blackmore, Belyuen

The Cox Peninsula Road is a rural road in the Northern Territory of Australia linking the Cox Peninsula and western shore of Darwin Harbour to the Stuart Highway in the rural suburb of Noonamah on the outskirts of Darwin. The route is approximately 80 km (50 mi) and passes through the town of Berry Springs as well as the rural areas of Tumbling Waters and Blackmore heading west, before turning north towards the Indigenous community of Belyuen. The road ends at a junction with Charles Point Road in Wagait Shire, a few kilometres west of Mandorah on the Cox Peninsula.

In 1987, with the introduction of a state route numbering system for rural roads in the Northern Territory, Cox Peninsular Road was designated State Route 34. As of 2004, some signs have replaced the blue shield symbols with the alphanumeric designation B34 following the adoption of a new route numbering system in the Territory.

While Cox Peninsula Road passes through three separate Local Government Areas, it is considered an important arterial road and as such falls under the jurisdiction of the Northern Territory Government for its maintenance and upkeep. The entire length of the road has been sealed since 2004. In addition to providing access to the Cox Peninsula, the tourist attractions of Litchfield National Park, Territory Wildlife Park and thermal pools at Berry Springs are also accessed from the road.

B34 alpha-numeric signage now replaces State Route 34 signage.
