= Charlotte, Northern Territory =

Charlotte Northern Territory
- Coordinates: 12°50′46″S 130°47′38″E
- Population: 18 (2016 census)
- Established: 4 April 2007
- Postcode(s): 0822
- Time zone: ACST (UTC+9:30)
- Location: 36 km (22 mi) S of Darwin City
- LGA(s): Unincorporated area
- Territory electorate(s): Daly
- Federal division(s): Lingiari
Mean max temp	Mean min temp	Annual rainfall
33.7 °C; 93 °F	21.2 °C; 70 °F	1,564.4 mm 61.6 in
Suburbs around Charlotte:
Cox Peninsula	Cox Peninsula	Blackmore
Bynoe; Rakula	Charlotte	Blackmore; Darwin River; Collett Creek
Rakula	Rakula	Finniss Valley
- Footnotes: Locations; Adjoining localities

Charlotte is a locality in the Northern Territory of Australia located about 36 kilometres (22 mi) south of the territorial capital of Darwin.

It consists of land within the boundaries of the cadastral unit of the Hundred of Hughes in the north and those parts of the hundreds of Finniss and Hart bounded by the Finniss River in the south.

It is named after the Charlotte River which was mapped along with the Annie River in 1869 by a survey team from the South Australian government expedition led by George Goyder. The official source suggests that the two rivers were named after family members of persons within the survey team. The locality’s boundaries and name were gazetted on 4 April 2007.

The Cox Peninsula Road passes throughout the top of the locality with the following roads branching off to the west and the south respectively – the Fog Bay Road and the Litchfield Park Road.

The Kangaroo Flats Training Area, an Australian Defence Force facility, is located within the locality’s boundaries.

The 2016 Australian census which was conducted in August 2016 reports that Charlotte had 18 people living within its boundaries.

Charlotte is located within the federal division of Lingiari, the territory electoral division of Daly and within the unincorporated areas of the Northern Territory.
