= Hundred of Bagot (Northern Territory) =

Cadastral in the Northern Territory, Australia

- Cadastral division
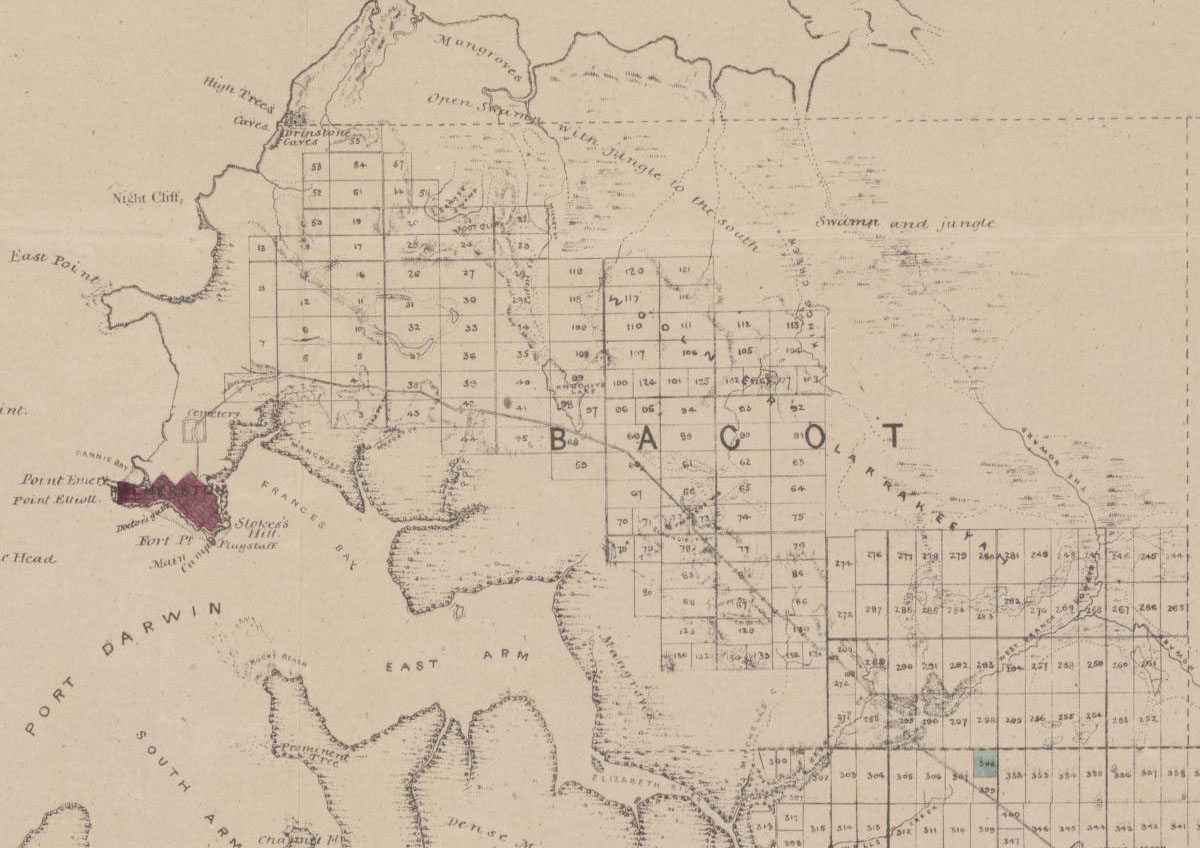
- Map of the hundred in 1872

- Coordinates: 12°27′36″S 130°56′31″E
- Country: Australia
- State: Northern Territory
- Established: 14 September 1871
- County: Palmerston
Lands administrative divisions around Hundred of Bagot
	Hundred of Bagot	Paton
Ayers	Strangways	Strangways

The Hundred of Bagot is the cadastral unit of hundred for the city of Darwin, Northern Territory and the city of Palmerston. It includes the Local Government Areas of the City of Darwin, the northern part of the City of Palmerston and part of the north-western edge of the Shire of Litchfield.

== History ==
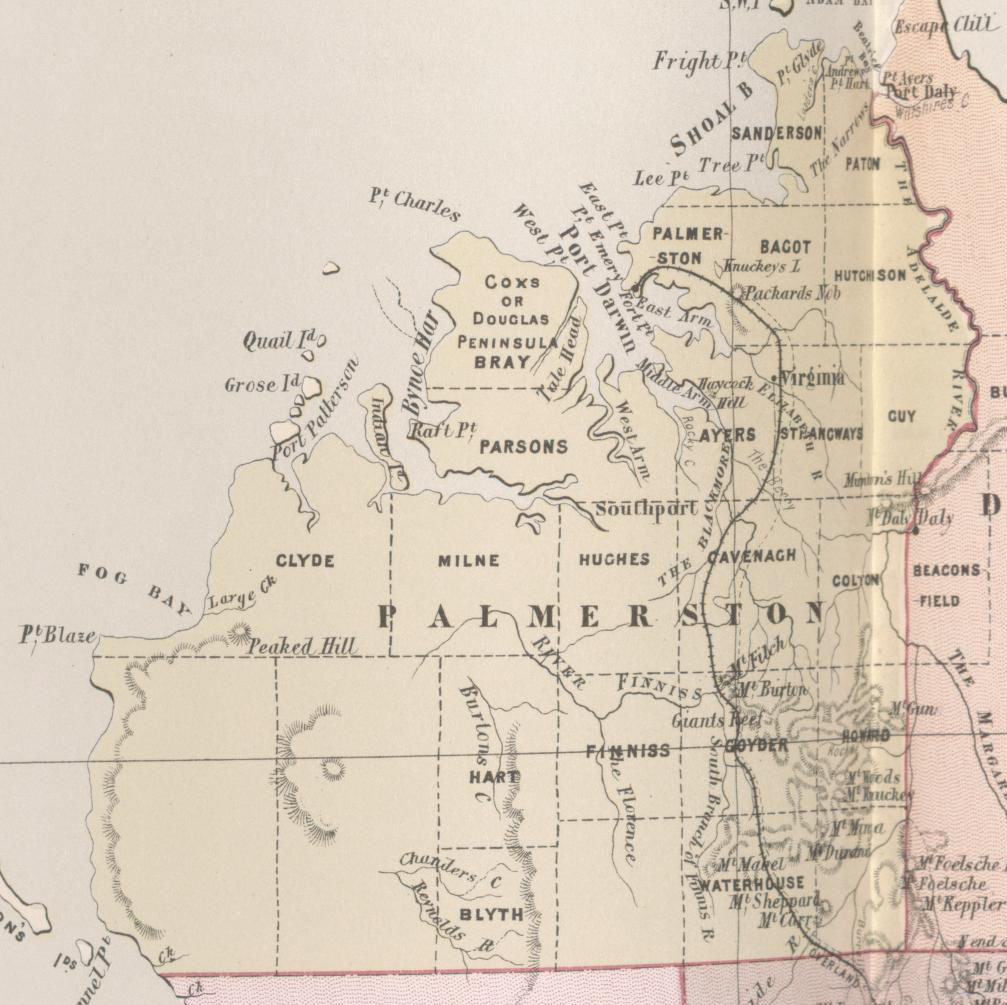
1886 map showing hundreds in Palmerston. The Hundred of Bagot since 1963 also includes the area shown here as the Hundred of Sanderson.

Bagot is one of the 14 hundreds that were proclaimed on 14 September 1871 by the Governor of South Australia in the County of Palmerston (although the map below shows 20 hundreds). It is believed to be named after John Tuthill Bagot, who was the Chief Secretary in the Strangways ministry of the Government of South Australia from 1868 to 1870.

The Hundred was enlarged in 1963 when the Governor-General of Australia, William Sidney, 1st Viscount De L'Isle, revoked the Hundred of Sanderson, formerly located to the north of Bagot, and included this into Bagot. Old maps of Darwin (formerly Palmerston) mention the Hundred of Bagot.

== Bagot Community ==
Bagot Community is an Aboriginal Community within the suburb of Ludmilla, a northern suburb of Darwin, which like the rest of the suburbs of Darwin, is part of the Hundred.

== SA Bagot ==
There is also a Hundred of Bagot in South Australia; the South Australian hundred was named after Captain Charles Hervey Bagot, the father of John Tuthill Bagot.
