= Bynoe, Northern Territory =

Bynoe
- Suburb
- Coordinates: 12°47′28″S 130°37′27″E
- Country: Australia
- State: Northern Territory
- LGA: unincorporated area
- Location: 46 km (29 mi) SW of Darwin City
- Established: 4 April 2007

Government
  - Territory electorate: Daly
  - Federal division: Lingiari

Population
  - Total: 96 (2016 census)
- Time zone: UTC+9:30 (ACST)
- Postcode: 0822
- Mean max temp: 31.9 °C (89.4 °F)
- Mean min temp: 23.3 °C (73.9 °F)
- Annual rainfall: 1,778.3 mm (70.01 in)
Suburbs around Bynoe
Dundee Forest	Bynoe Harbour; Cox Peninsula	Cox Peninsula
Dundee Forest; Dundee Downs; Rakula	Bynoe	Charlotte
Rakula	Rakula	Charlotte
- Locations; Adjoining localities

Bynoe is a locality in the Northern Territory of Australia located about 46 kilometres (29 mi) south-west of the territorial capital of Darwin.

Bynoe consists of land in the cadastral unit of the Hundred of Milne with exception of the part of the hundred located south of the Finniss River. It is named after the Bynoe Harbour whose coastline forms its northern boundary. It also includes part of the subdivision known as "Milne Inlet". Its boundaries and name were gazetted on 4 April 2007.

The Fog Bay Road passes throughout the locality from the Cox Peninsula Road in the east.

The 2016 Australian census reported that Bynoe had 96 people living within its boundaries.

Bynoe is located within the federal division of Lingiari, the territory electoral division of Daly and within the unincorporated areas of the Northern Territory.
