= Belyuen, Northern Territory =

Belyuen
- Town
- Coordinates: 12°32′18″S 130°41′00″E
- Country: Australia
- State: Northern Territory
- LGA: Belyuen Community Council
- Location: 17 km (11 mi) SW of Darwin City
- Established: 4 April 2007

Government
  - Territory electorate: Daly
  - Federal division: Lingiari

Population
  - Total: 164 (2016 census)
- Time zone: UTC+9:30 (ACST)
- Postcode: 0822
- Mean max temp: 32.0 °C (89.6 °F)
- Mean min temp: 23.2 °C (73.8 °F)
- Annual rainfall: 1,725.1 mm (67.92 in)
Localities around Belyuen
Cox Peninsula	Cox Peninsula	Cox Peninsula
Cox Peninsula	Belyuen	Cox Peninsula
Cox Peninsula	Cox Peninsula	Cox Peninsula
- Locations; Adjoining localities

Belyuen, formerly known as Delissaville, is a community in the Northern Territory of Australia located on the Cox Peninsula about 17 kilometres (11 mi) south-west of the territorial capital of Darwin.

Belyuen consists of land under the control of the Belyuen Aboriginal community council. The community was previously known as Delissaville, but changed in 1975 to Belyuen, which is the name of a "nearby waterhole". Belyuen's boundaries and name were gazetted on 4 April 2007.

The 2016 Australian census, conducted in August 2016, reports that Belyuen had 164 people living within its boundaries.

Belyuen is located within the federal division of Lingiari, the territory electoral division of Daly and the local government area of the Belyuen Shire.

== History ==
=== Delissa Pioneer Sugar plantation ===
In 1881 G. T. Bean floated a company – Adelaide and Port Darwin Sugar Company – to establish sugar plantations in the Northern Territory. Investors included Benjamin Cohen DeLissa of Queensland (after whom the town of Delissaville (now Belyuen) was named), G. T Bean, W. H. Bean, Arthur Bean, Luther Scammell, George Scarfe and F. W. Stokes.

In 1882, a trial sugar plantation named Delissaville was established on Cox's Peninsula across from Port Darwin. Bean organised the hire of 2,000 Singapore Chinese labourers to work the field at £1 per week. Apart from the Chinese, local Aboriginal people including Wagait, Larrakia and Iwaidja people, were utilised as unpaid labour. Housing was erected, many cane tubers were supplied by the Government botanist M. W. Holtze from the nursery at Fannie Bay, and a mill was erected by the Delissa Pioneer Sugar Company.

Benjamin DeLissa, who had been appointed supervisor for his sugar plantation experience, made a trial crushing of 30 tons of cane in December 1881 which returned very little sugar. DeLissa quit in 1882, citing interference by G. T. Bean, who was scathing in his denunciation of DeLissa. W. H. Thompson was brought from Antigua to take over management of the plantations. The machinery was bought for a tenth of its original £6,000 by W. H. Gray, for his Daly River Plantation Company but his plantation also failed, and it was left to rust away.

In 1885 the 100,000 acre lease was resumed for non-compliance with the conditions. G. T. Bean was criticised for spending Adelaide and Port Darwin Sugar Company money on worthless land without due diligence, over-extending his stay in London and overspending his allowance there.

=== Aboriginal reserve ===
In 1941, 350 acres of land around Delissaville was acquired by the government to form an Aboriginal reserve. The reserve was established as a facility to hold Aboriginal people convicted of crimes in Darwin, and as a place to house older Aboriginal people. It was also touted as a "holiday" destination for Aboriginal workers in Darwin. However, when Aboriginal internees left the facility without official permission, they were sentenced to jail for a month.

Housing, two schools, a cattle station and an airstrip were constructed at Delissville to cater for a population of around 200 people. An elected council of eight Indigenous members but overseen by a white administrator was also established. In 1952, a teacher at one of the schools at Delissaville was jailed for indecent assault of male students.

The residents at Delissaville would, on occasions, perform corroboree dances for tourists. World famous American dancer, Ted Shawn visited in 1947 and described the Aboriginal performers, especially a Wagait man named Mosick (Johnny Bianomu), as world class artists.

=== Belyuen community and the Kenbi land claim ===
In 1975, the Delissaville community's name was changed to Belyuen and the area was gazetted as Aboriginal land without a formal land claim process. Several Wagait and Larrakia lineage groups sought land rights claims over the region, and a protacted and disputed process known as the Kenbi land claim (Kenbi being the Wagait word for crocodile) came into being. The process was finally completed in 2024.

== Belyuen in the modern day ==
The Belyuen Aboriginal community is serviced by a school, general store, aged care facility, airstrip and a community government council.
