= Hughes Airport =

Hughes Airport may refer to:

- Hughes Airport (Alaska), an active airport in Hughes, Alaska, United States (IATA: HUS)
- Hughes Airport (California), a former airport in Los Angeles, California, United States (IATA: CVR)
- Hughes Airfield, in the Northern Territory of Australia
