= Dundee Downs, Northern Territory =

Dundee Downs
- Suburb
- Coordinates: 12°45′45″S 130°31′30″E
- Country: Australia
- State: Northern Territory
- LGA: unincorporated area
- Location: 52 km (32 mi) SW of Darwin City
- Established: 29 October 1997

Government
  - Territory electorate: Daly
  - Federal division: Lingiari

Population
  - Total: 86 (2016 census)
- Time zone: UTC+9:30 (ACST)
- Postcode: 0840
- Mean max temp: 31.9 °C (89.4 °F)
- Mean min temp: 23.3 °C (73.9 °F)
- Annual rainfall: 1,778.3 mm (70.01 in)
Suburbs around Dundee Downs
Dundee Forest	Dundee Forest; Bynoe	Bynoe
Dundee Forest	Dundee Downs	Bynoe
Rakula	Rakula	Bynoe
- Locations; Adjoining localities

Dundee Downs is a locality in the Scooma Bay area of the Northern Territory of Australia located about 52 kilometres (32 mi) south-west of the territory capital of Darwin.

Dundee Downs consists of land located just south of the natural water body of Bynoe Harbour and largely north of the Fog Bay Road which passes through the locality near its southern boundary on its way from the Cox Peninsula Road in the east to Fog Bay in the west. Dundee Downs and the other two nearby localities prefixed with the name "Dundee" are named after the sub-divisions with these names. The name "Dundee" is believed to be derived from the 1986 film, Crocodile Dundee. The boundaries for Dundee Downs were gazetted on 29 October 1997 with the gazettal being revoked on 3 April 2007 with new boundaries being gazetted on 4 April 2007.

The 2016 Australian census which was conducted in August 2016 reports that Dundee Downs had 86 people living within its boundaries.

Dundee Downs is located within the federal division of Lingiari, the territory electoral division of Daly and within the unincorporated areas of the Northern Territory.
