= Hundred of Blyth =

The Hundred of Blyth refers to a cadastral unit (land division). It may refer to:

- Hundred of Blyth (Northern Territory)
- Hundred of Blyth (South Australia)
