= Hundred of Hutchison =

The Hundred of Hutchison refers to a cadastral unit. It could be

- Hundred of Hutchison (Northern Territory)
- Hundred of Hutchison (South Australia)
