= Hundred of Milne =

The Hundred of Milne refers to a cadastral unit (land division). It may refer to:

- Hundred of Milne (Northern Territory)
- Hundred of Milne (South Australia)
