= Malmesbury (disambiguation) =

Malmesbury is a market town in Wiltshire, England.

Malmesbury or Malmsbury may also refer to:

== Places ==
- Malmesbury, South Africa, a farming town in South Africa
  - Malmesbury (House of Assembly of South Africa constituency)
- Malmsbury, Victoria, a town in Australia
- Malmesbury (UK Parliament constituency), a former parliamentary borough
- Malmesbury House, building in Salisbury, England

== Other uses ==
- Malmesbury Abbey, Benedictine abbey in Wiltshire, England
- The Earl of Malmesbury, a title in the peerage of Great Britain
- William of Malmesbury, English historian of the 12th century
- County of Malmesbury, former county in Northern Territory, Australia
