= Dundee Beach, Northern Territory =

Dundee Northern Territory
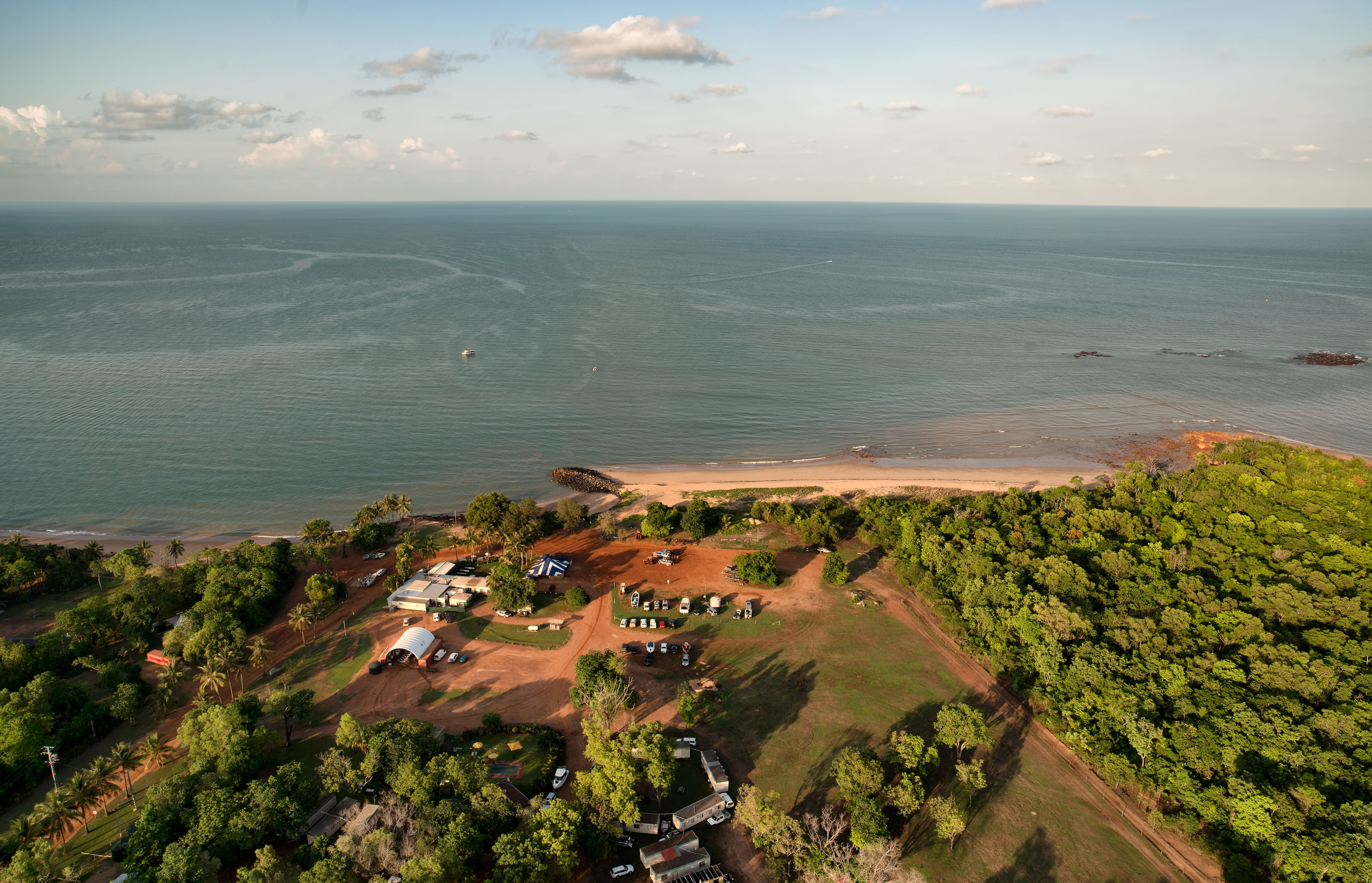
- The Lodge of Dundee at Dundee Beach

- Coordinates: 12°44′00″S 130°22′59″E
- Population: 207 (2016 census)
- Established: 29 October 1997
- Postcode(s): 0840
- Time zone: ACST (UTC+9:30)
- Location: 59 km (37 mi) SW of Darwin
- LGA(s): unincorporated area
- Territory electorate(s): Daly
- Federal division(s): Lingiari
Mean max temp	Mean min temp	Annual rainfall
31.9 °C; 89 °F	23.3 °C; 74 °F	1,778.3 mm 70 in
Suburbs around Dundee:
Timor Sea	Beagle Gulf; Bynoe Harbour	Dundee Forest
Timor Sea	Dundee Beach	Dundee Forest
Timor Sea	Rakula	Rakula
- Footnotes: Adjoining localities

Dundee Beach is a locality in the Northern Territory of Australia, located approximately 59 kilometres (37 miles) southwest of the territory capital of Darwin. The 2016 Australian census which was conducted in August 2016 reported Dundee Beach's population to be 207.

== Geography ==
Dundee Beach consists of land bounded by the coast of Fog Bay in the west and a subsidiary inlet of Bynoe Harbour in the east and the waters to the west of the coastline for a distance of 3 nautical miles (5.6 km; 3.5 mi).

== Name ==
Dundee Beach and the other two nearby localities prefixed with the name "Dundee" are named after the sub-divisions with these names. The name "Dundee" is believed to be derived from the 1986 film, Crocodile Dundee. The boundaries for Dundee Beach were gazetted on 29 October 1997 with the gazettal being revoked on 3 April 2007 with new boundaries being gazetted on 4 April 2007.

== History ==
Development in the area began in the 1990s, originally as a weekend retreat for Darwin residents. The local economy is still largely dependent on tourism, with fishing being the main attraction. Community services and amenities include a small school established in 1998, a volunteer fire brigade and several sporting and social clubs.

=== Swivel gun discovery ===
One of Australia's earliest artifacts of European origin was found by a 13-year-old school boy on Dundee Beach in 2010. Initially believed to be a Portuguese Swivel gun dating from the 1500s, the discovery prompted international media attention and renewed speculation about early Portuguese exploration of Australia prior to the arrival of Captain Cook on the East Coast in 1770.

However this claim has been disputed by the Museum and Art Gallery of the Northern Territory following analysis of sand inside the gun's barrel dating it closer to 1750. The museum instead speculated it was likely dropped overboard by Makassan traders who were known to visit the area to harvest Sea cucumber and trade with local Aboriginal peoples. This indicates the gun was more likely a copy of a Dutch or Portuguese design, manufactured in South East Asia.

== Governance ==
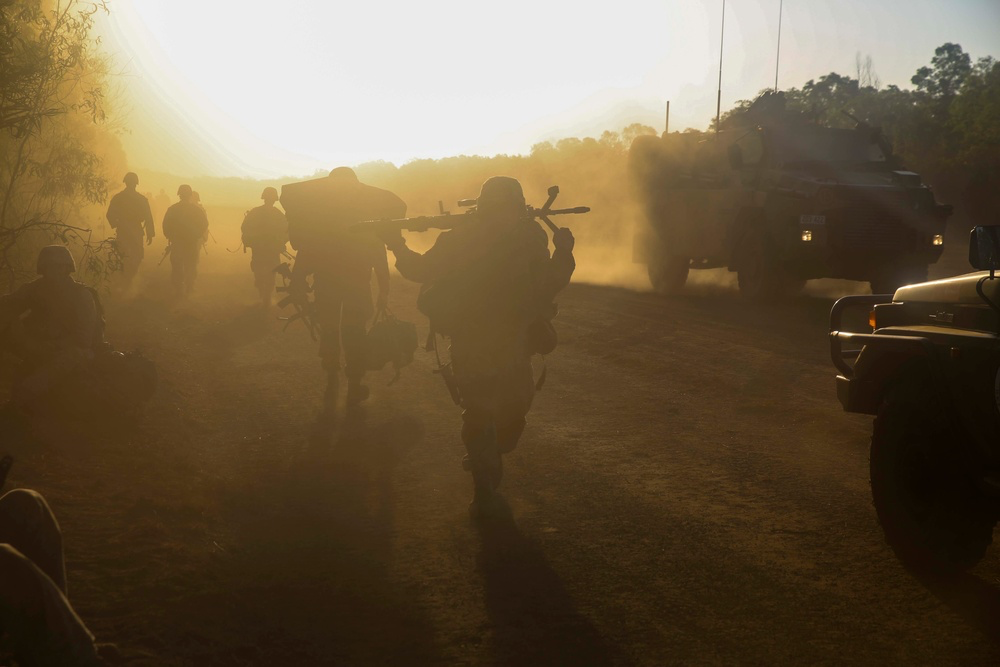
U.S. Marines and Australian soldiers on exercise near Dundee Beach, July 2015

Dundee Beach is located within the federal division of Lingiari, the territory electoral division of Daly and the unincorporated areas of the Northern Territory. The possibility of Dundee Beach and adjoining localities being included in an expanded Coomalie Shire was discussed in 2009 without any decisive outcome. However, a poll of residents carried out in 2012 showed that a majority were in favour of retaining the unincorporated area status.

Currently, the Dundee Progress Association, a volunteer association, represents the interests of residents in the locality and those in Bynoe Harbour (sic), Dundee Downs and Dundee Forest to the organizations including the Northern Territory Government.
