= Kangaroo Flats Training Area =

Military training area in the Northern Territory, Australia

- KFTA
- Charlotte, Northern Territory in Australia

Site information
- Type: Army barracks (late 1970s-present)
- Owner: Department of Defence
- Operator: Australian Army (late 1970s-present)

Location
- Location in the Northern Territory
- Coordinates: 12°47′31.8″S 130°51′08.9″E
- Area: 5,000 hectares (12,000 acres)

The Kangaroo Flats Training Area (KFTA) is an Australian Army training area located in the Northern Territory of Australia.

Located near Berry Springs, Northern Territory, KFTA was initially established in the late 1970s as a field firing range for the Australian Army's North-West Mobile Force (NORFORCE).

An expansion in 1999 allowed for the construction of a 150-person camp, including generators, septic systems, bore water, car parking, kitchens, toilets, mess and administration facilities. Facilities include five training ranges including sneaker lanes, a gallery range, snap range, section defence range and an assault grenade range.

By 2020 it had grown to about 5,000 ha (12,000 acres) in size, accommodating multiple field firing ranges.

As of 2020 the training area was being utilised by Indigenous recruits from NORFORCE, as well as general field weapons training for other military units.

In 2021, prime minister Scott Morrison visited Robertson Barracks, where he announced a spend of A$747 million to upgrade the Robertson Barracks Close Training Area, Kangaroo Flats Training Area, Mount Bundey Training Area and Bradshaw Field Training Area. This was part of a total of A$8 billion allocated for spending on defence installations in the Northern Territory.
