= Wagait Beach =

Suburb in Northern Territory, Australia

Wagait Beach Northern Territory
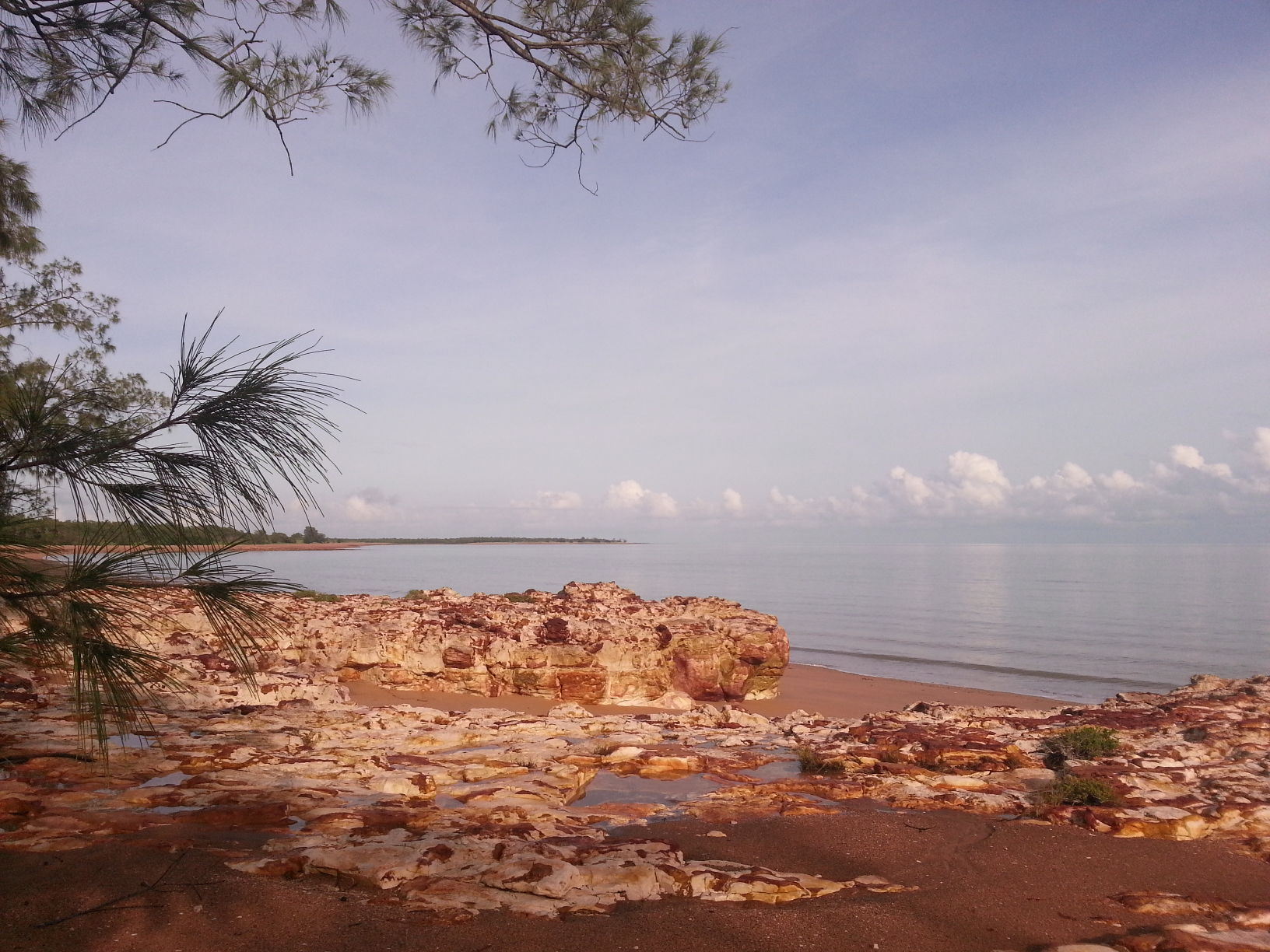
- Rocks at Imaluk Beach

- Coordinates: 12°26′03″S 130°44′32″E
- Population: 461 (2016 census)
- Postcode(s): 0822
- Time zone: ACST (UTC+9:30)
- Location: 128 km (80 mi) from Darwin
- LGA(s): Wagait Shire
- Territory electorate(s): Daly
- Federal division(s): Lingiari
Mean max temp	Mean min temp	Annual rainfall
32.0 °C; 90 °F	23.2 °C; 74 °F	1,725.1 mm 67.9 in
Localities around Wagait Beach:
Darwin Harbour	Darwin Harbour	Darwin Harbour
Cox Peninsula	Wagait Beach	Mandorah
Cox Peninsula	Cox Peninsula	Mandorah
- Footnotes: Adjoining localities

Wagait Beach is a locality approximately 8 km west of Darwin, Northern Territory, Australia, on the opposite side of the harbour. It makes up the Wagait Shire local government area. The population was 422 in 2021.

Wagait Beach is on the north coast of the Cox Peninsula, which forms the western side of Darwin Harbour. It is part of the Hundred of Bray, as surveyed by George Goyder in 1869–70.

== History ==
In 1942, after the Bombing of Darwin, a military base was established at Waugite Point on the north east of the Cox Peninsula, and a huge observation tower was constructed, with a communications bunker underneath it. Waugaite tower was destroyed by Cyclone Tracy in 1974. The precise origin of the name of the community is unclear, but the beach adjacent to Wagait Point is called Wagait Beach. One source claims that the community was named after the tower, which is unconvincing as the tower was named after Waugite (Wagait) Point and so clearly is not the origin of the name.

== Transport ==
Wagait Beach can be accessed by a 15-minute passenger ferry trip, from Cullen Bay (Darwin), to Mandorah which is 5 km from Wagait Beach. There is a bicycle path from Mandorah to Wagait Beach. It is a 128 km drive from Darwin via the Cox Peninsula Rd through Berry Springs.

== See also ==
- List of surviving Consolidated B-24 Liberators
