= Dundee Forest, Northern Territory =

Dundee Forest Northern Territory
- Coordinates: 12°43′27″S 130°27′15″E
- Population: 73 (2016 census)
- Established: 29 October 1997
- Postcode(s): 0840
- Time zone: ACST (UTC+9:30)
- Location: 58 km (36 mi) SW of Darwin City
- LGA(s): unincorporated area
- Territory electorate(s): Daly
- Federal division(s): Lingiari
Mean max temp	Mean min temp	Annual rainfall
31.9 °C; 89 °F	23.3 °C; 74 °F	1,778.3 mm 70 in
Suburbs around Dundee Forest:
Bynoe Harbour	Bynoe Harbour	Bynoe Harbour
Bynoe Harbour; Dundee Beach	Dundee Forest	Bynoe Harbour; Bynoe; Dundee Downs
Rakula	Rakula	Rakula
- Footnotes: Locations; Adjoining localities

Dundee Forest is a locality in the Northern Territory of Australia located about 58 kilometres (36 mi) south-west of the territory capital of Darwin. The 2016 Australian census which was conducted in August 2016 reports that Dundee Forest had 73 people living within its boundaries.

== Geography ==
Dundee Forest consists of land extending from the coastline of Bynoe Harbour in the north to just south of the Fog Bay Road which passes through the locality on its way from the Cox Peninsula Road in the east to Fog Bay in the west. Dundee Forest and the other two nearby localities prefixed with the name "Dundee" are named after the sub-divisions with these names. The name "Dundee" is believed to be derived from the 1986 film, Crocodile Dundee. The boundaries for Dundee Forest were gazetted on 29 October 1997 with the gazettal being revoked on 3 April 2007 with new boundaries being gazetted on 4 April 2007.

Dundee Forest is located within the federal division of Lingiari, the territory electoral division of Daly and within the unincorporated areas of the Northern Territory.
