= Livingstone, Northern Territory =

Livingstone Darwin, Northern Territory
- Coordinates: 12°40′58.45″S 131°04′54.80″E
- Population: 452 (2016 census)
- Established: 29 July 1998
- Postcode(s): 0822
- Location: 48.5 km (30 mi) from Darwin; 28.6 km (18 mi) from Palmerston
- LGA(s): Litchfield Municipality
- Territory electorate(s): Daly
- Federal division(s): Lingiari
Suburbs around Livingstone:
Noonamah	Noonamah	Noonamah; Hughes
Berry Springs	Livingstone	Hughes; Acacia Hills
Darwin River	Darwin River; Fly Creek	Acacia Hills
- Footnotes: Adjoining suburbs

Livingstone is an outer rural locality near Darwin. The name "Livingstone" derived from the war-time airstrip which was named after John D Livingstone, Jnr. On 4 April 1942, Livingstone was wounded during action over Darwin, but flew to the newly completed 34 mile airstrip where he crash landed, but died in the resultant inferno. He was buried at "The Gardens Cemetery". The 34 Mile strip was named Livingstone in his honour. Livingstone has a rural recreation reserve managed by a community management committee and provides a Friday night 34 mile bar and bistro frequented by locals and visitors.
