= Hundred of Guy =

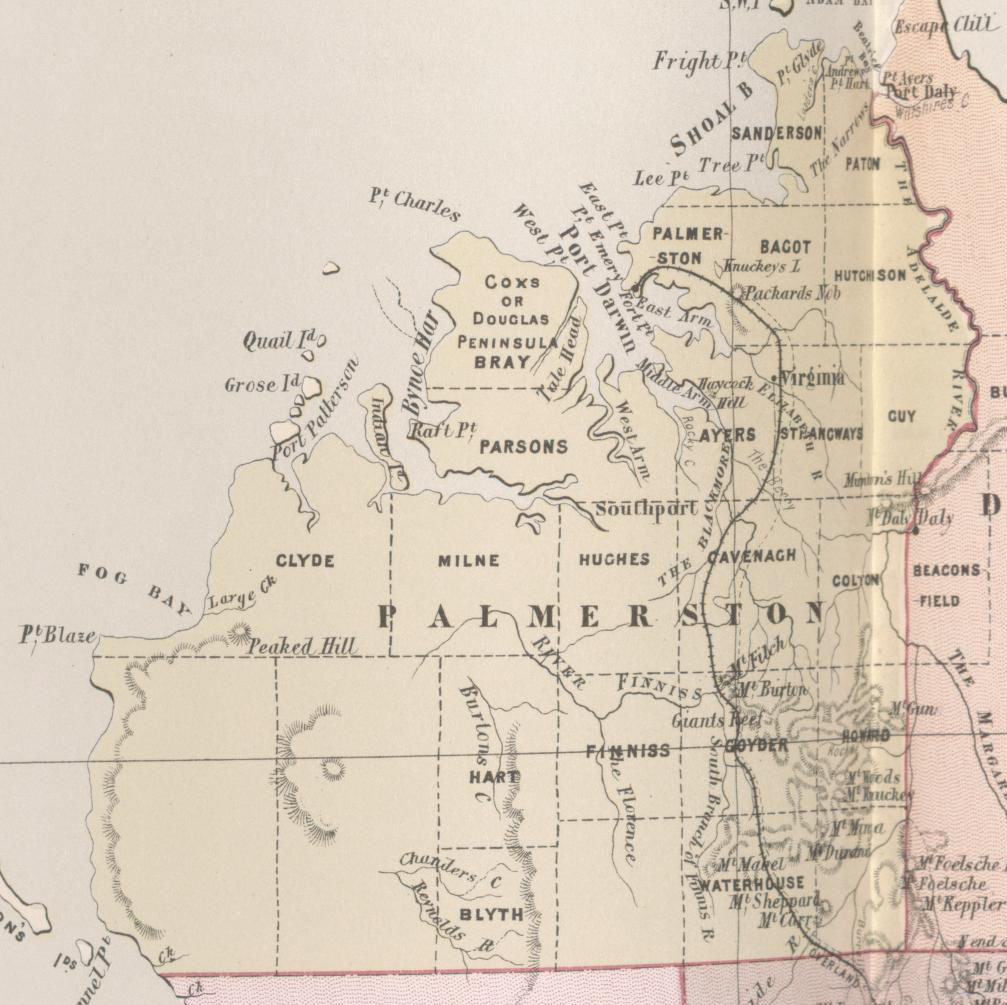
Map of Palmerston County in 1886, showing the hundreds.

The Hundred of Guy is a Hundred of Palmerston County, Northern Territory Australia.

The hundred is at 12.633333°S 131.216667°E near Humpty Doo. The Hundred takes in the coastal plain area west of the Adelaide River and contains the 1954 Humpty Doo Rice Project area and the original 'Umpity Doo' Agricultural Lease surveyed in 1908/1910. Today much of the hundred is within the Harrison Dam Conservation Area.

This Hundred is named after Michael Stewart Guy, a marine surveyor who had joined the Royal Navy at the age of 14, served on the Rodney & Stromboli during the Crimean War, served under Commander Hutchison on HMS Beatrice while surveying the Northern Territory.
