= Hughes, Northern Territory =

Hughes Darwin, Northern Territory
- Coordinates: 12°41′12″S 131°05′58″E
- Population: 70 (2016 census)
- Postcode(s): 0837
- Time zone: ACST (UTC+9:30)
- LGA(s): Litchfield Municipality
- Territory electorate(s): Goyder
- Federal division(s): Lingiari
Mean max temp	Mean min temp	Annual rainfall
34.4 °C; 94 °F	20.6 °C; 69 °F	1,393.9 mm 54.9 in
Suburbs around Hughes:
Noonamah	Noonamah	Lloyd Creek
Noonamah; Livingstone	Hughes	Lloyd Creek
Livingstone	Acacia Hills	Acacia Hills
- Footnotes: Adjoining suburbs

Hughes is an outer rural locality of Darwin, located approximately 38 km (24 mi) south-west of the city in the Litchfield Municipality. The name of the locality derived from Hughes Airfield constructed in the area during the Second World War. The airfield itself was named after W A Hughes, Director of Mines in the Northern Territory before the war. The airfield is still in occasional use, occupying much of the western half of the locality adjacent to the Stuart Highway. The eastern portion of Hughes, north of Townend Road is characterised by mostly small farms and rural residential development.

In 2021, Hughes Airfield received a Federal government grant of $600,000 to re-seal the runway, reflecting its role in support of aerial firefighting operations during the bushfire season.
