= Hundred of Cavenagh (Northern Territory) =

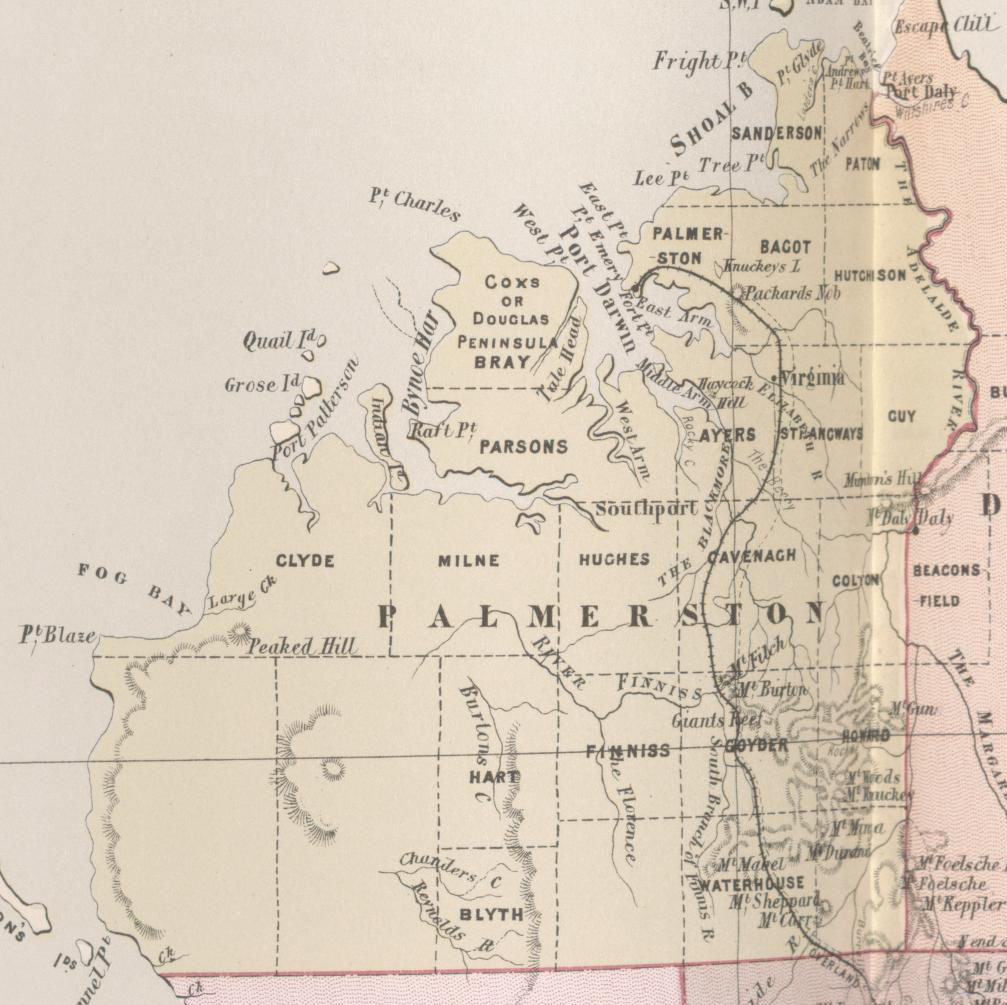
Map of Palmerston County in 1886, showing the hundreds.

The Hundred of Cavenagh is a Hundred of Palmerston County, Northern Territory Australia.

The Hundred is located at Latitude -12°49'S and Longitude 130°59'E.

This Hundred was gazetted on 14/09/1871 and is named after Wentworth Cavenagh, Mayor of Adelaide in 1874 and later became Premier of South Australia.
