= Lloyd Creek, Northern Territory =

Lloyd Creek Darwin, Northern Territory
- Coordinates: 12°37′00.86″S 131°07′34.42″E
- Population: 165 (2016 census)
- LGA(s): Litchfield Municipality
Suburbs around Lloyd Creek:
	Humpty Doo
Noonamah; Hughes	Lloyd Creek	Wak Wak
	Acacia Hills	Daly
- Footnotes: Adjoining suburbs

Lloyd Creek is an outer rural locality of Darwin. It was named by Fred Litchfield in 1865 after John Vereker Lloyd, who had accompanied Litchfield in exploration. Lloyd Creek was incorporated in 1869.
