= Darwin River =

- Suburb
- Interactive map of Darwin River
- Coordinates: 12°48′03.61″S 130°56′57.29″E
- Country: Australia
- State: Northern Territory
- City: Darwin
- LGA: Litchfield Municipality

Government
  - Territory electorate: Daly
  - Federal division: Lingiari

Population
  - Total: 696 (2016 census)
Suburbs around Darwin River
Charlotte	Blackmore; Tumbling Waters; Berry Springs; Livingstone	Livingstone
Charlotte	Darwin River	Fly Creek; Darwin River Dam
Charlotte	Collett Creek; Darwin River Dam	Darwin River Dam

Darwin River is an outer suburban area in Darwin. The name of the locality derived from the Darwin River which flows through the locality.
