= Hundred of Glyde (Northern Territory) =

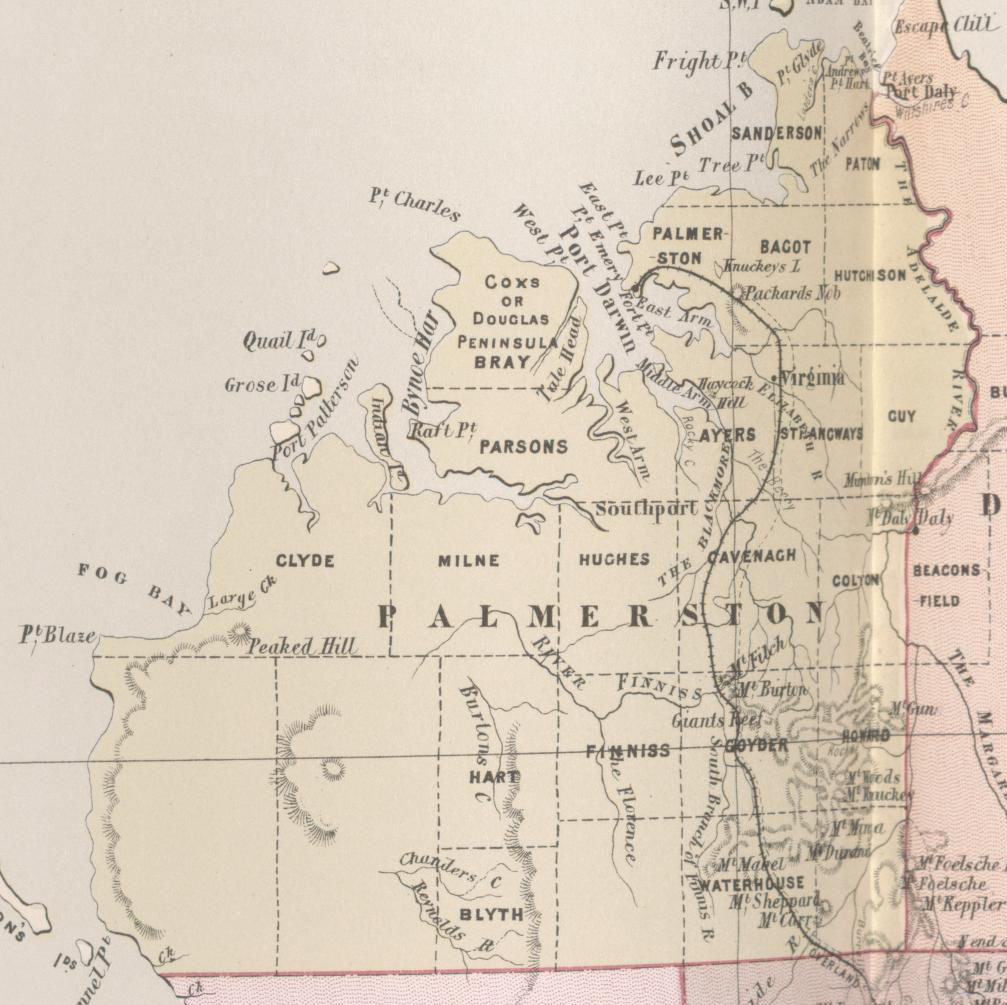
Map of Palmerston County in 1886, showing the hundreds.

The Hundred of Glyde is a hundred of Palmerston County, Northern Territory, Australia.

This hundred is at latitude 12° 46′ S and longitude 130° 22′ E, lying south of Bynoe Harbour in Palmerston County, and was one of the first 13 hundreds gazetted in the Northern Territory in 1871. The Hundred of Glyde was named after Lavington Glyde, a parliamentarian in South Australia. The hundred also includes Fog Bay, Northern Territory.

== See also ==
- Hundred of Glyde (South Australia)
