= Fly Creek, Northern Territory =

Fly Creek Darwin, Northern Territory
- Coordinates: 12°48′04.40″S 131°04′07.64″E
- Population: 166 (2016 census)
- LGA(s): Litchfield Municipality
Suburbs around Fly Creek:
Livingstone	Livingstone	Acacia Hills
Darwin River	Fly Creek	Acacia Hills
Darwin River	Darwin Dam River	Darwin Dam River
- Footnotes: Adjoining suburbs

Fly Creek is an outer rural locality in Darwin. The area was named by surveyor William Harvey, a member of George Goyder's parties, who came across a watercourse and was likely worried by flies in the vicinity.
