= Hundred of Howard =

Municipality in Australia

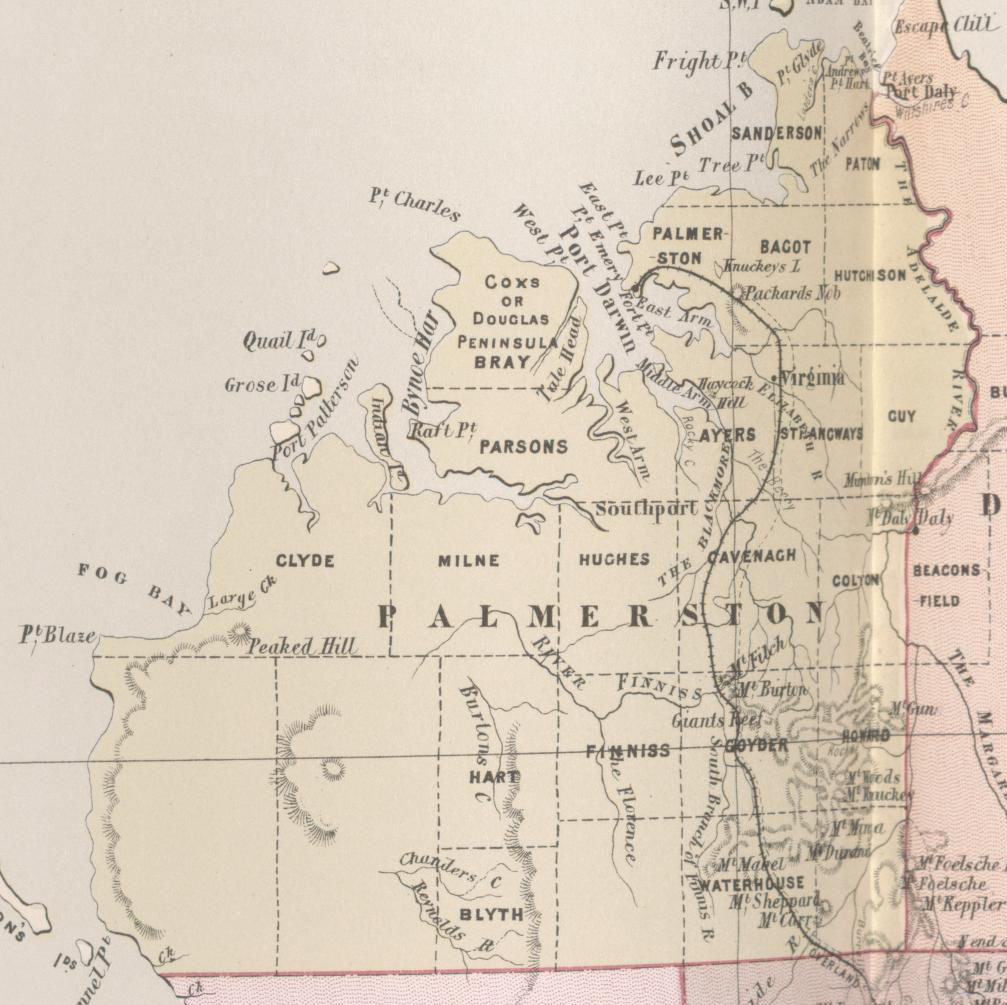
Palmerston County in 1886, showing the hundreds

The Hundred of Howard is a hundred of Palmerston County, Northern Territory Australia.

The Hundred is located at latitude-13°01'S and longitude 131° 10'E, south east of Darwin, but west of the Adelaide River, and was one of the first thirteen gazetted in the Northern Territory on 14/09/1871. It was named after Captain Frederick Howard.
