= Hundred of Ayers (Northern Territory) =

Coordinates: 12.633333°S 130.916667°E

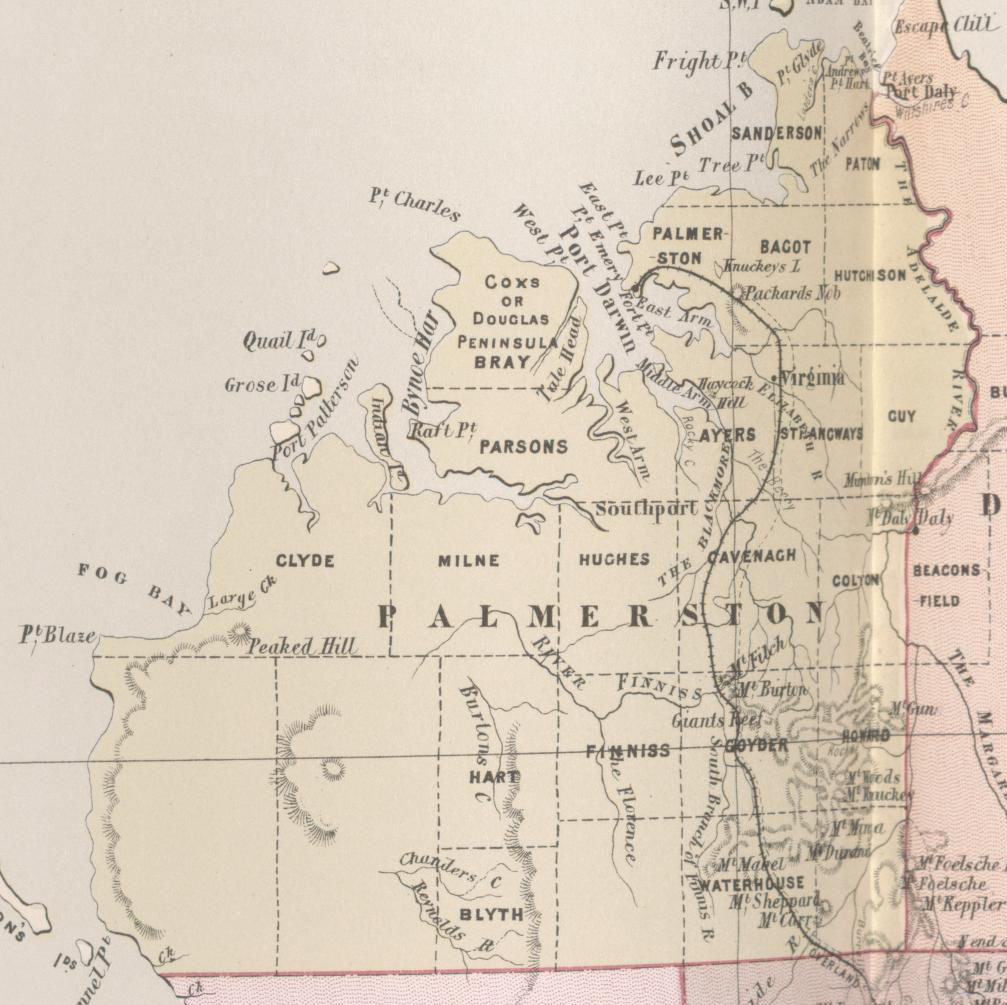
Map of Palmerston County in 1886, showing the Hundred of Ayers.

The Hundred of Ayers is a hundred within Palmerston County, in the Northern Territory, Australia.

The hundred is located at and spans Berry Springs. It extends to the southern part of the Darwin Harbour and is named after Sir Henry Ayers, the Chief Secretary of South Australia who was honoured by the explorer W.C Gosse in 1873 in the naming of Ayers Rock.
