= Acacia Hills, Northern Territory =

Acacia Hills
- Suburb
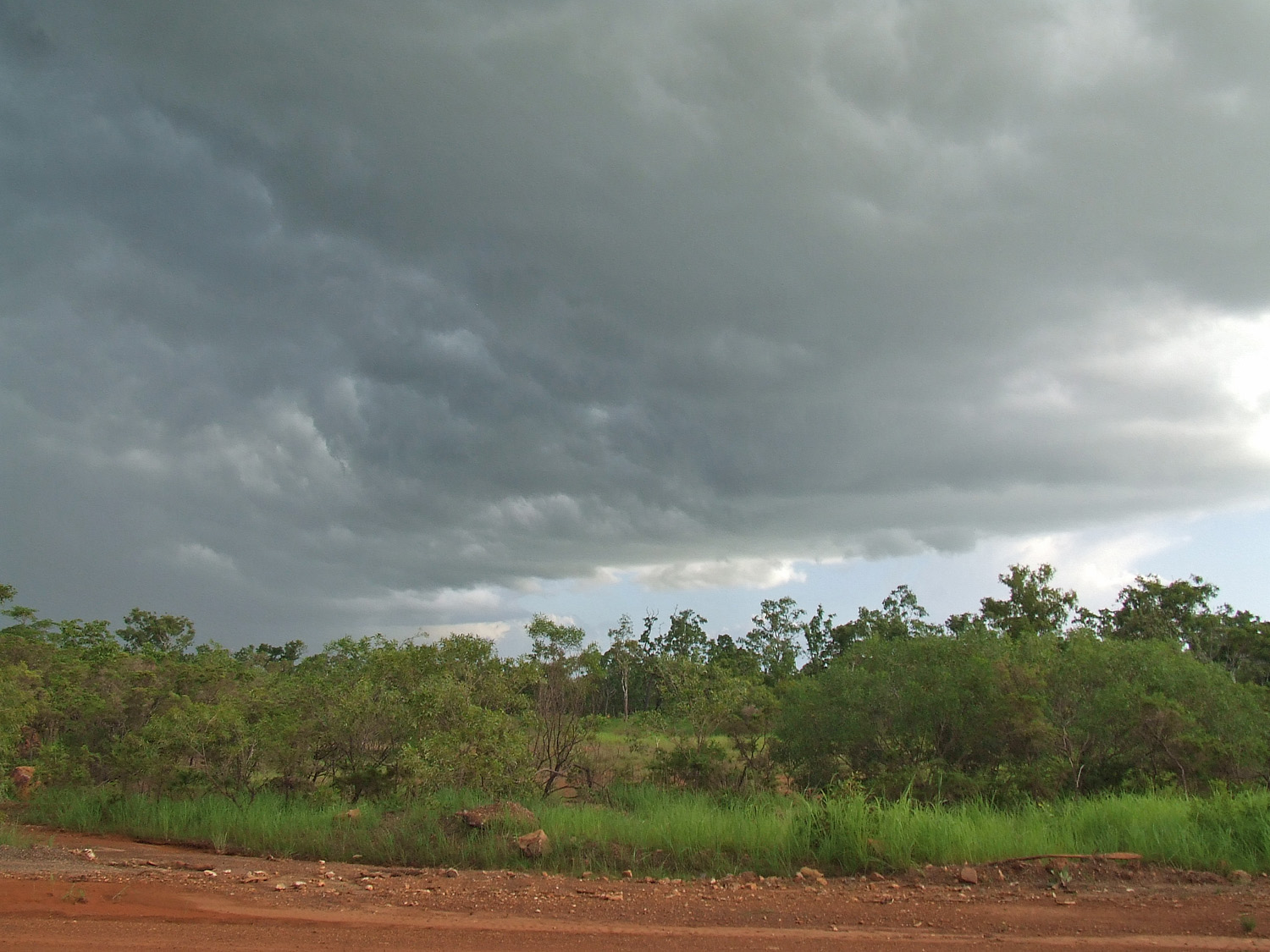
- Acacia Hills

- Interactive map of Acacia Hills
- Coordinates: 12°47′44″S 131°07′23″E
- Country: Australia
- State: Northern Territory
- City: Darwin
- LGA: Litchfield Municipality
- Location: 60.2 km (37.4 mi) from Darwin

Government
  - Territory electorate: Goyder
  - Federal division: Solomon

Population
  - Total: 711 (2021 census)
- Postcode: 0822
Suburbs around Acacia Hills
Livingstone	Hughes; Lloyd Creek; Wak Wak	Wak Wak
Fly Creek; Livingstone	Acacia Hills	Daly; Manton
Darwin River Dam	Manton Dam Recreation Area	Lake Bennett

Acacia Hills is an outer rural locality of Darwin. It is 60 kilometres (37 mi) south of the Darwin CBD in Litchfield Municipality. Named for the acacia shrub that is endemic to the area, the suburb is largely rural land, just north of Manton Dam and west of the Adelaide River. Mango farming is an important local industry. Both the Stuart Highway and Adelaide–Darwin rail corridor pass through the area.

The area is notable as the site of the 1999 Acacia Hills Shootout, where bushman Rodney Ansell ambushed several policemen at a roadblock. Ansell killed one policeman but was eventually shot himself in the gun battle that followed.

Acacia Hills again made national news in 2021, when the Northern Territory Environmental Protection Authority ordered a Victorian company to remove 3000 tonnes of used tyres which were discovered to have been stored illegally on a local property.
