= Southport, Northern Territory =

Southport Darwin, Northern Territory
- Coordinates: 12°43′20″S 130°56′57″E
- Population: 232 (2016 census)
- Established: 29 October 1997 (locality)
- Postcode(s): 0822
- LGA(s): Litchfield Municipality
- Territory electorate(s): Goyder
- Federal division(s): Lingiari
Suburbs around Southport:
Blackmore	Blackmore; Berry Springs	Berry Springs
Blackmore	Southport	Berry Springs
Blackmore	Tumbling Waters	Tumbling Waters
- Footnotes: Adjoining suburbs

Southport is an outer rural locality in Darwin. It is based on the site of the abandoned Town of Southport, a thriving river port during the Pine Creek gold rush of the 1870s. It is located at the junction of the Blackmore and Darwin Rivers.

== History ==
=== 1870s and Gold Rush ===
During an expedition beginning in 1868 led by the Surveyor General of South Australia, George Goyder, four towns were surveyed in 1870 – Daly, Palmerston, (now Darwin), Southport and Virginia. Goyder's initial plans were for a town that would occupy some 500 acres, including 335 half acre blocks for development. Streets were laid out and named after members of the surveyor's party.

Between 1870 and 1872, the construction of the Overland Telegraph encouraged development in Southport. The new town was used as a depot for construction teams working on this significant infrastructure project. A telegraph office opened in 1874 following the completion of the line. The river trade to Darwin was served by a government jetty (initially only useful when the tide was at its highest) with a privately built landing alongside.

The discovery of gold near Pine Creek during Telegraph construction saw Southport rapidly develop into an important regional centre. Local businessman John Lewis began using the town to land provisions in support of the gold mines to the south in 1872. In 1873 he constructed a second jetty and powder store to facilitate unloading of supplies and explosives. Other mining companies were encouraged to set up support operations in the town.

For around twenty years Southport was a thriving town serving road and river traffic between Port Darwin and the flourishing gold mines in the Pine Creek area. It incorporated at least two hotels (the best-known being those of Emil Marker and Samuel Brown), a post office and numerous businesses including blacksmiths', wheelwrights' and saddlers' shops, telegraph and police station, gunpowder magazine, bond store, general stores and even a cordial factory. The steam launch Palmerston was commissioned between Port Darwin and Southport in 1877, which improved the service and reduced the trip to one of 3 hours.

=== North Australia Railway and Decline ===
The town began to decline in the 1880s, largely due to reduced traffic between the town and goldfields to the south. By 1885 many businesses had closed. Whilst there was still a blacksmith, saddler and wheelwright in town, they were supplemented by only a single hotel and three general stores. As Chinese migrants began to flock to the goldfields the Chinatown district continued to flourish with many dwellings and stores. Chinese influence remained strong in the town until its eventual abandonment.

With the opening of the Darwin to Pine Creek railway in 1888, a railway siding and station were provided to serve Southport. However, business collapsed and the town (which had a large Chinese population) became practically deserted. By 1890, all public buildings had been demolished and either rebuilt in Palmerston or salvaged. In 1891, a 15-acre (6 ha) agricultural block, which had been developed by Samuel Brown, sold for as little as 25 shillings, and seven township lots went for one shilling each.

=== World War II ===
No. 224 Radar Station of 44 Radar Wing, Royal Australian Air Force was installed in close proximity to the Southport Road railway station and became operational in April 1944. The advanced radar was useful during stormy conditions common in the area during summer months and was able to locate and guide home a number of lost allied aircraft in the latter stages of the war. In addition to two large radar towers and a communications radio mast, the site had a generator for electrical power, mess and accommodation facilities. Some evidence of the tower foundations remains today.

== Today ==
Interest in the township and the region was renewed in the late 20th century with the expansion of population in the greater Darwin area and the desire of many for a rural lifestyle. The streets are as originally laid out, and though unsealed are well maintained. There is no jetty but the concrete boat ramp is popular with boating and fishing enthusiasts. Elsewhere the river is virtually inaccessible due to tidal mangrove swamp. There are no shops, camping or toilet facilities.

== Bibliography ==
Gamon T.I. & Walsh M.J. Southport – gateway to Pine Creek Goldfields 1869–1889 Q994.295GAM
