= County of Malmesbury =

County of Malmesbury Northern Territory
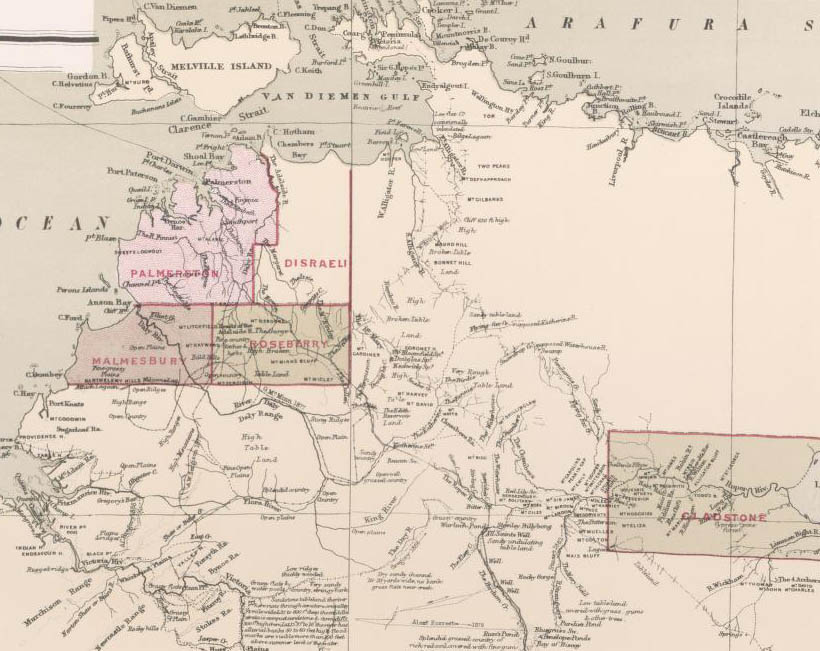
- 1886 map showing the part of the Northern Territory near Darwin subdivided into five counties

- Coordinates: 13°37′S 130°26′E
- Established: 16 July 1885
- Abolished: 1976
Lands administrative divisions around County of Malmesbury:
Ocean	Palmerston	Palmerston
Ocean	County of Malmesbury	Rosebery
-	-	-
- Footnotes: Adjoining counties

County of Malmesbury was one of the five counties in the Northern Territory which are part of the Lands administrative divisions of Australia.

This County, in the Daly River area, lapsed with the passage in 1976 and assent of the Crown Lands Ordinance 1976 (No 1 of 1977) and the Crown Lands (Validation of Proclamations) Ordinance 1976 (No.2 of 1977).

== Description ==
The County was named after James H. Harris, 3rd Earl of Malmesbury (1807 - 1889) Foreign Secretary under Lord Derby in 1852. The South Australian administration named the Counties of Malmesbury and Rosebery on 16 July 1885 at a time when these two statesmen were prominent in the British Parliament and early developments were occurring on the Daly River and in the Pine Creek mining area of the Territory.

== Constituent hundreds ==
=== Hundred of Berinka ===
The Hundred of Berinka (13°40′30″S 130°26′24″E) was gazetted in July 1885 and was extended in October 1913.

=== Hundred of Hawkshaw ===
The Hundred of Hawkshaw (13°36′00″S 130°30′52″E) was gazetted on 16 July 1885 and was extended in October 1913. The Hundred was roughly ten miles by ten miles in keeping with the colonial policy of forming 100 square mile units.
