= Mandorah =

- Town
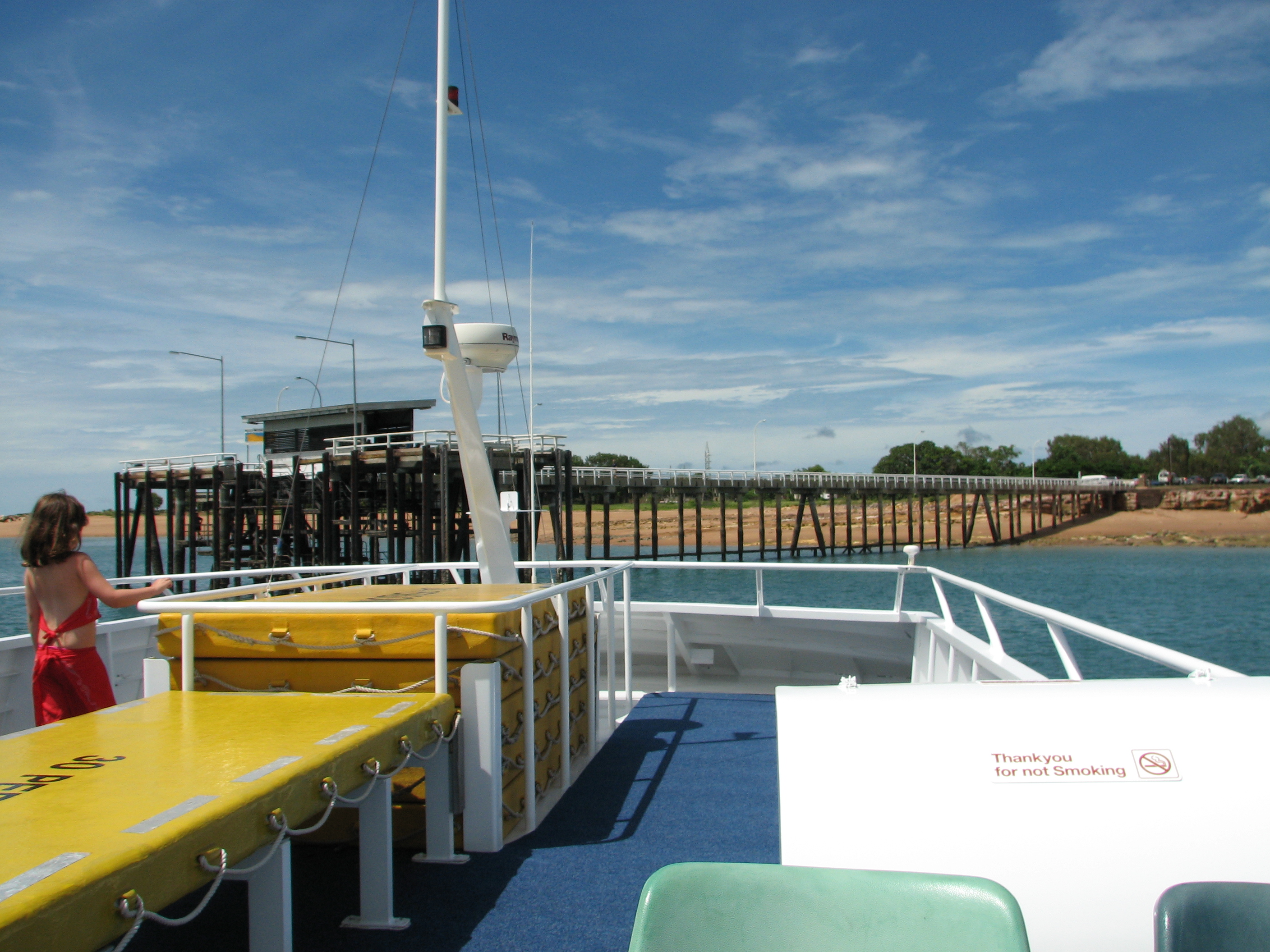
- Sea Cat Ferry approaching Mandorah Wharf

- Coordinates: 12°26′58″S 130°45′27″E
- Country: Australia
- State: Northern Territory
- LGA: Wagait Shire
- Location: 8 km (5.0 mi) W of Darwin; 130 km (81 mi) from Darwin
- Established: 4 December 2002

Government
  - Territory electorate: Daly
  - Federal division: Lingiari

Population
  - Total: 0 (SAL 2016)
- Time zone: UTC+9:30 (ACST)
- Postcode: 0822
- Mean max temp: 32.0 °C (89.6 °F)
- Mean min temp: 23.2 °C (73.8 °F)
- Annual rainfall: 1,725.1 mm (67.92 in)
Localities around Mandorah
Wagait Beach	Wagait Beach; Darwin Harbour	Darwin Harbour
Wagait Beach; Cox Peninsula	Mandorah	Darwin Harbour
Cox Peninsula	Cox Peninsula	Darwin Harbour

Mandorah is a locality in the Northern Territory of Australia. Its local government area is the Wagait Shire.

The locality of Mandorah on the Cox Peninsula, across the harbour from Darwin, is named after "Mandorah", a guest house built in what is now the locality by Allan Hartwig prior to 1948.

In 2019 the Northern Territory Government announced it would spend up to $50 million to replace the Mandorah jetty, construct a breakwater to protect it from damage during storms, and construct a boat ramp. The original jetty was built in the 1960s and repaired several times since it was damaged by Cyclone Tracy in 1974. The temporary repairs had posed difficulties for disabled people wanting to use the ferry service. Wagait Shire welcomed the project as an opportunity to encourage economic development in the Cox Peninsula.
