= Cox Peninsula, Northern Territory =

Cox Peninsula
- Suburb
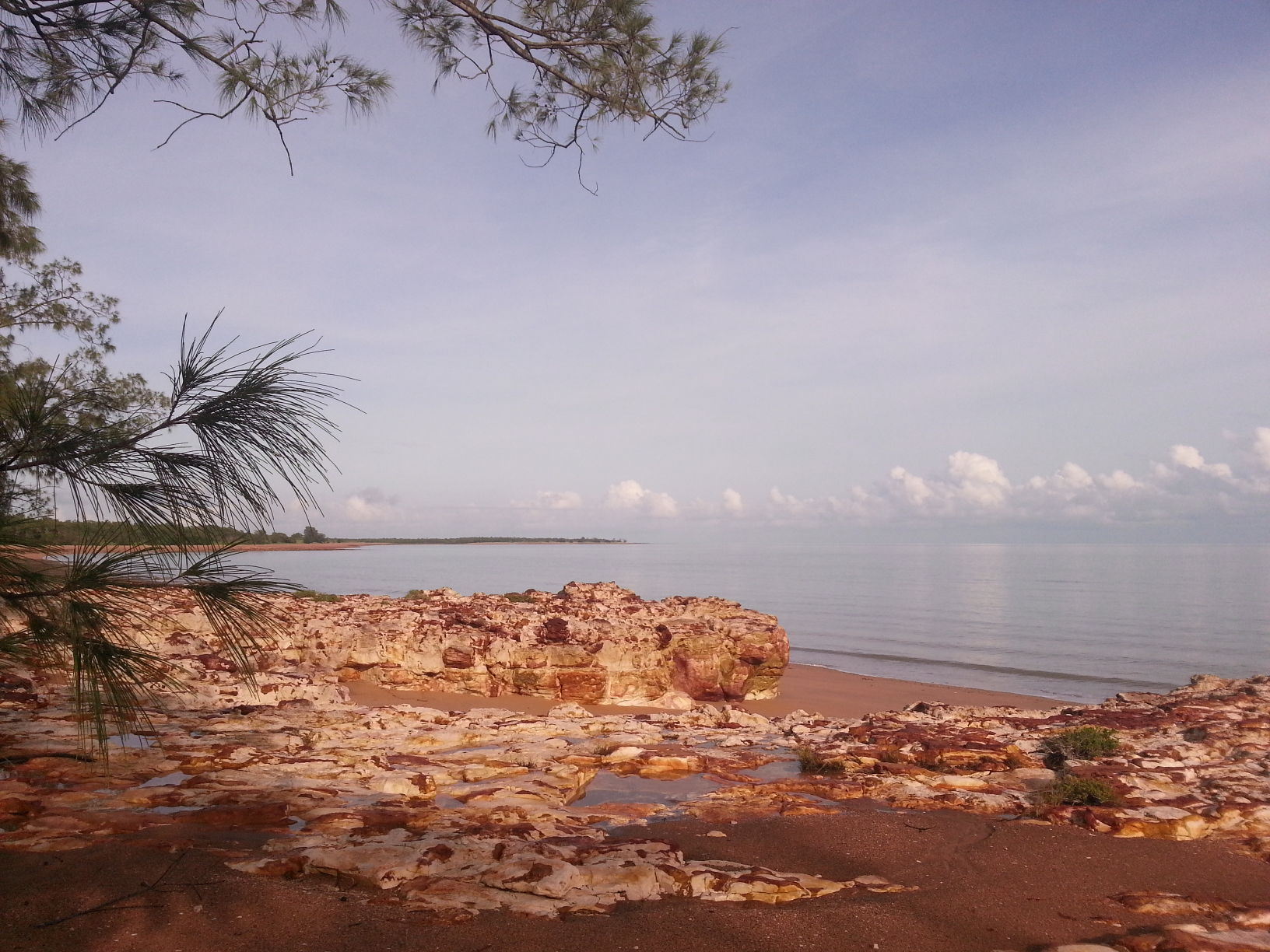
- Rocks at Imaluk Beach

- Coordinates: 12°32′56″S 130°43′03″E
- Country: Australia
- State: Northern Territory
- LGA: Unincorporated area
- Location: 28 km (17 mi) SW of Darwin City
- Established: 4 April 2007

Government
  - Territory electorate: Daly
  - Federal division: Lingiari

Population
  - Total: 15 (2016 census)
- Time zone: UTC+9:30 (ACST)
- Postcode: 0822
- Mean max temp: 32.0 °C (89.6 °F)
- Mean min temp: 23.2 °C (73.8 °F)
- Annual rainfall: 1,725.1 mm (67.92 in)
Suburbs around Cox Peninsula
Beagle Gulf	Beagle Gulf; Darwin Harbour	Darwin Harbour; Wagait Beach; Mandorah; Darwin Harbour
Beagle Gulf; Bynoe	Cox Peninsula	Darwin Harbour; Channel Island; Wickham Blackmore
Bynoe	Bynoe; Charlotte	Blackmore
- Locations; Adjoining localities (Note: the locality of Cox Peninsula fully surrounds the locality of Belyuen.)

Cox Peninsula is a locality in the Northern Territory of Australia located on the Cox Peninsula and adjoining land about 28 kilometres (17 mi) south-west of the territorial capital of Darwin.

Cox Peninsula consists of land both on the Cox Peninsula and its immediate south and which is located within the cadastral units of the hundreds of Bray and Parsons, but does not included land within the two local government areas established on the peninsula, the Belyuen Shire and Wagait Shire.

The locality is named after the Cox Peninsula which itself is named after Matthew Dillon Cox, a pastoralist who applied in 1869 for a lease over the entire peninsula. Its boundaries and name were gazetted on 4 April 2007.

The 2016 Australian census which was conducted in August 2016 reports that Cox Peninsula had 15 people living within its boundaries.

Cox Peninsula is located within the federal division of Lingiari, the territory electoral division of Daly and within the unincorporated areas of the Northern Territory.
