= Tumbling Waters =

Tumbling Waters Darwin, Northern Territory
- Coordinates: 12°45′56.04″S 130°57′22.86″E
- Population: 170 (2016 census)
- Established: 1869
- Postcode(s): 0822
- Location: 66.4 km (41 mi) from Darwin; 46.5 km (29 mi) from Palmerston
- LGA(s): Litchfield Municipality
- Territory electorate(s): Goyder
- Federal division(s): Solomon
Suburbs around Tumbling Waters:
Blackmore	Southport; Berry Springs	Berry Springs
Blackmore	Tumbling Waters	Berry Springs
Blackmore; Darwin River	Darwin River	Darwin River
- Footnotes: Adjoining suburbs

Tumbling Waters is an outer rural location in Darwin. The name of the locality derived from the town which was named after the rapids "Tumbling Waters" where R C Burton discovered gold in 1869.
