= Blackmore, Northern Territory =

Blackmore Darwin, Northern Territory
- Coordinates: 12°45′03.48″S 130°55′09.83″E
- Population: 41 (2016 census)
- LGA(s): Litchfield Municipality
- Territory electorate(s): Daly
- Federal division(s): Lingiari
Suburbs around Blackmore:
Cox Peninsula	Wickham	Wickham; Weddell
Cox Peninsula; Charlotte	Blackmore	Weddell; Berry Springs; Southport; Tumbling Waters; Darwin River
Charlotte	Darwin River	Darwin River

Blackmore is an outer rural locality in Darwin. It is adjacent to the Blackmore River.
