= Hundred of Hutchison (Northern Territory) =

Coordinates: 12°28′S 131°11′E

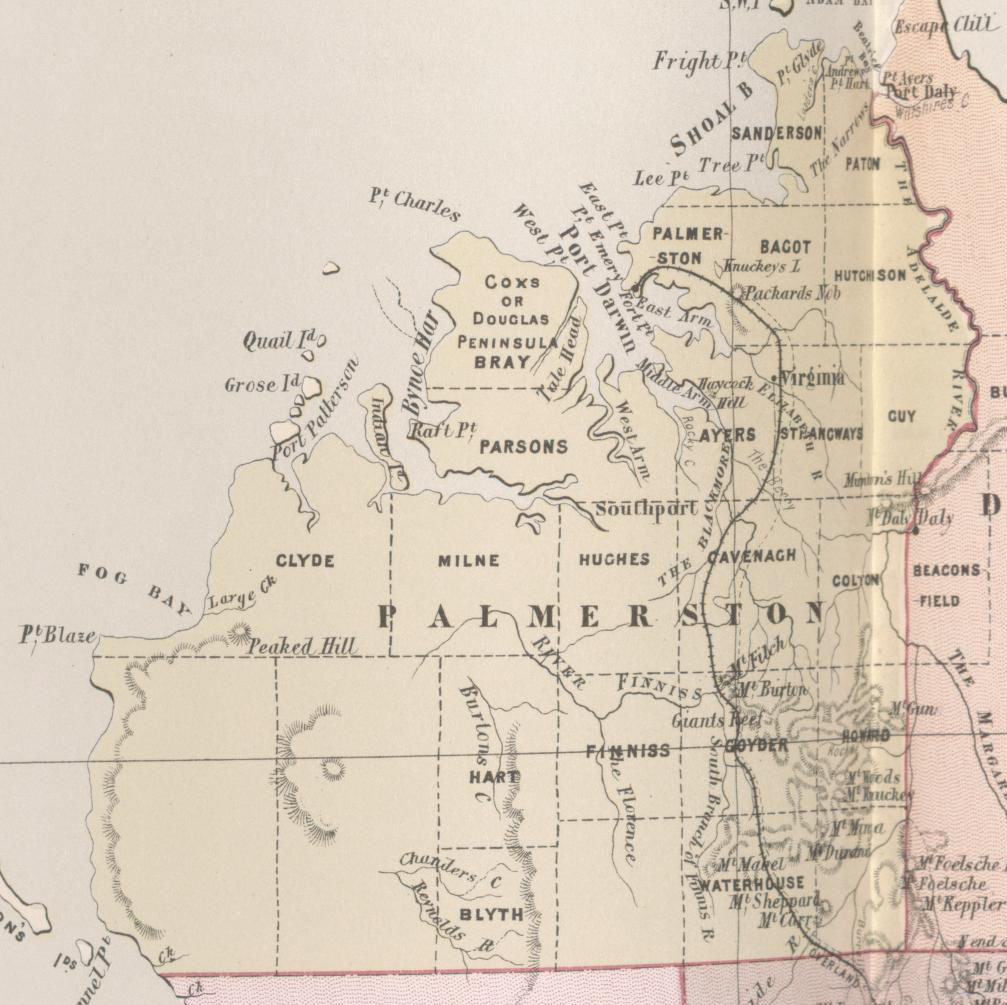
Map of Palmerston County in 1886, showing the hundreds.

The Hundred of Hutchison is a hundred in the Northern Territory of Australia within the former County of Palmerston.

The hundred is located to the east of Palmerston and is bounded on the east by the Adelaide River.

== Name ==
The Hundred of Hutchison was named after Commander John Hutchison, a marine surveyor of the South Australian Survey Station between 1852 and 1865, and who mapped much of the Northern Territory coastline.
