= Noonamah =

- Suburb
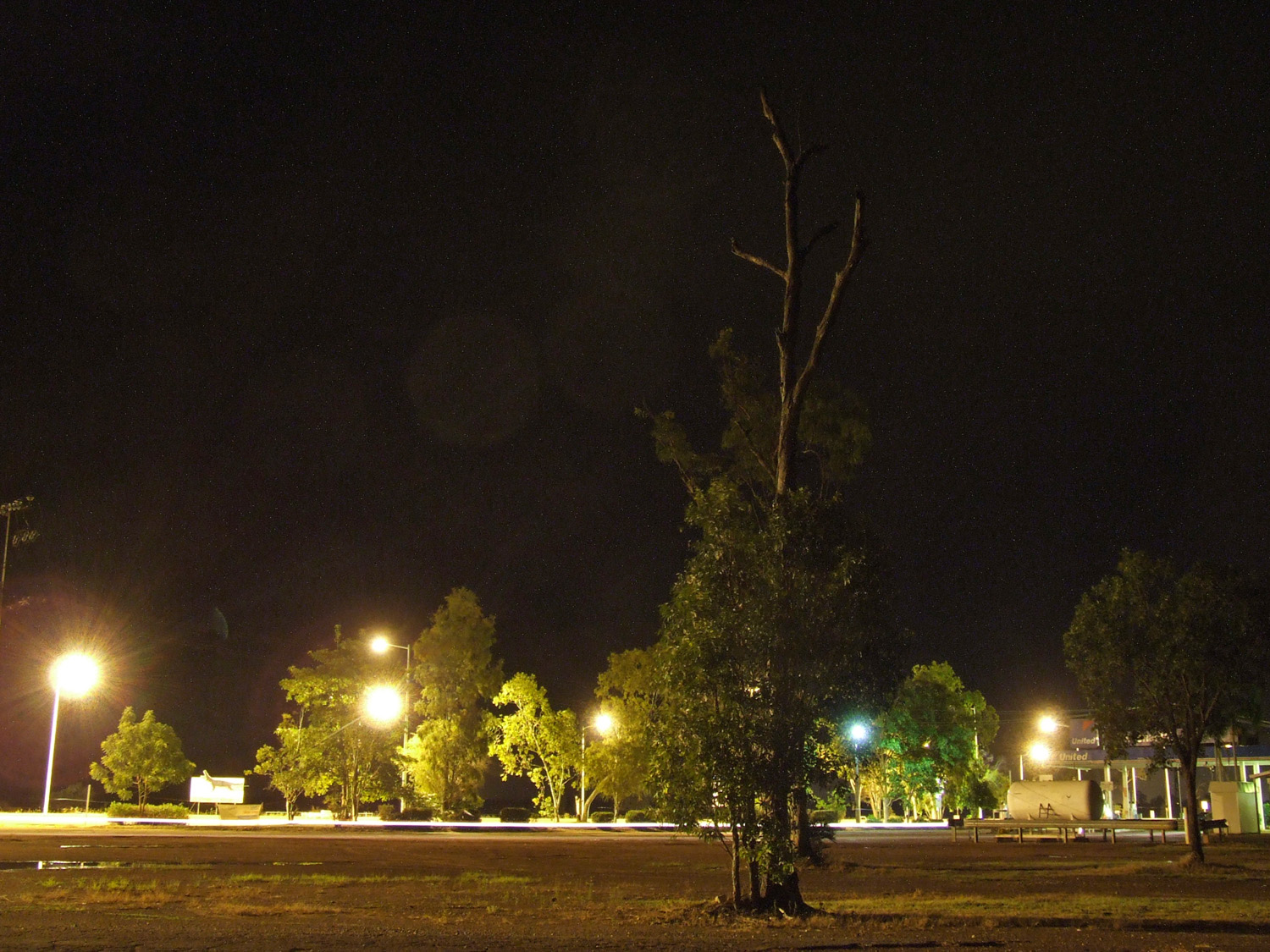

- Interactive map of Noonamah
- Coordinates: 12°38′3″S 131°4′25″E
- Country: Australia
- State: Northern Territory
- City: Darwin
- LGA: Litchfield Municipality
- Location: 45.6 km (28.3 mi) from Darwin; 25.7 km (16.0 mi) from Palmerston
- Established: 1941

Government
  - Territory electorates: Goyder; Daly
  - Federal division: Lingiari
- Elevation: 18 m (59 ft)

Population
  - Total: 319 (2016 census)
- Postcode: 0837
- Mean max temp: 34.5 °C (94.1 °F)
- Mean min temp: 22.0 °C (71.6 °F)
- Annual rainfall: 1,532.0 mm (60.31 in)
Suburbs around Noonamah
Bees Creek; Weddell	Humpty Doo	Humpty Doo
Weddell	Noonamah	Lloyd Creek
Weddell; Berry Springs	Berry Springs; Livingstone; Hughes	Lloyd Creek

Noonamah is an outer rural suburban area of Darwin. It is 46 km (29 mi) southeast of the Darwin CBD. Its Local Government Area is the Litchfield Municipality. The suburb is mostly a rural area, but has been experiencing strong growth in population and development. The Elizabeth River flows through Noonamah towards the East Arm of Darwin Harbour.

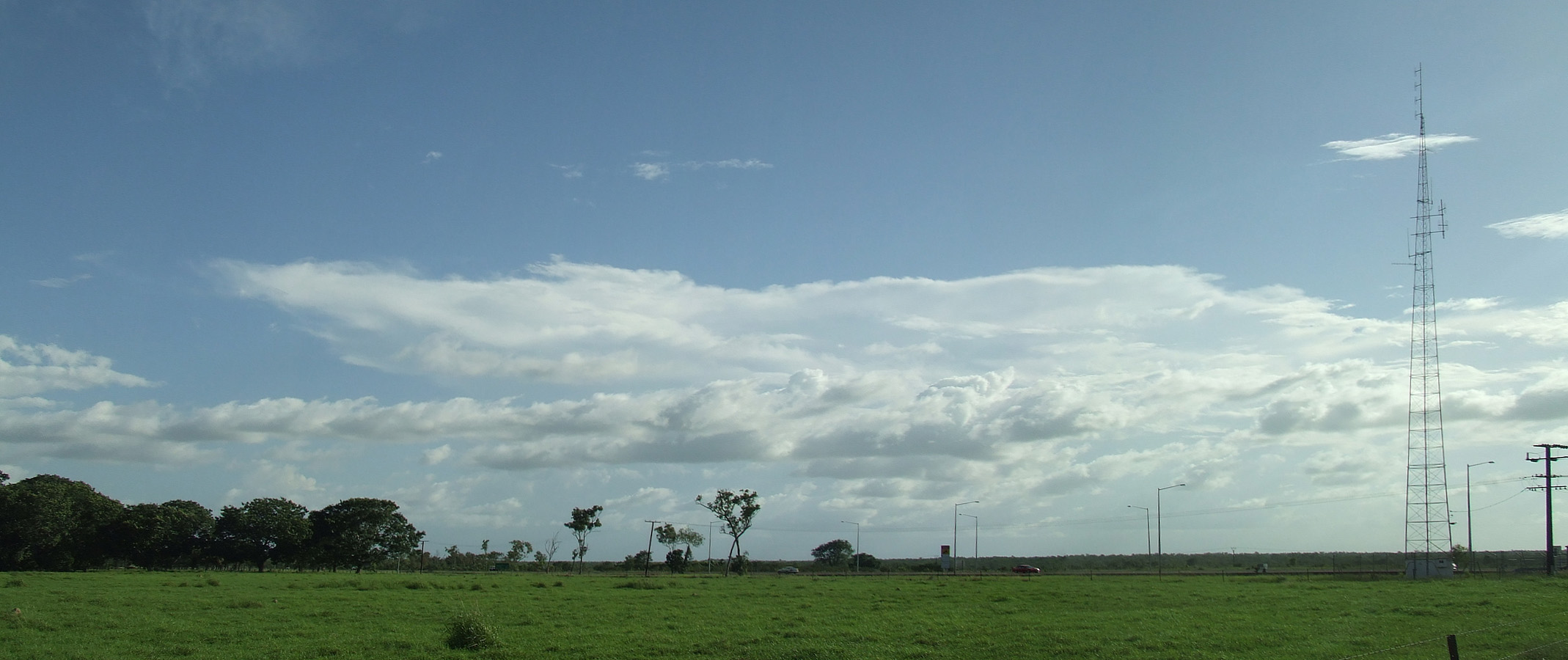
Noonamah Panorama

== History ==
The name of the locality was applied in 1941. "Noonamah" was taken from the language of the Wagaman Aboriginal people and means "plenty of tucker and good things".

In 1942, a railway siding and storage depot were constructed on the North Australia Railway at the site of present-day Noonamah, to support the Strauss Airfield and a number of nearby military airfields being established in the area. A cricket pitch was built by members of the 27th Australian Infantry Brigade in the same year while stationed at the camp. The cricket pitch has hosted games between local residents and serving personnel on ANZAC Day many times since the war, and is now heritage listed. Noonamah and surrounding areas were bombed by the Japanese extensively throughout 1942.

The North Australia Railway was largely sustained after the war by the activities of the Frances Creek Iron Ore Mine. Several factors during the 1970s influenced the closure of the railway, including increased maintenance costs to support heavier trains, damage from Cyclone Tracy in 1974 and high costs of rail transport. The mine had ceased operations by the beginning of 1975 and the railway closed soon after in 1976. The Adelaide-Darwin Railway opened in 2004, but on a new alignment that bypasses Noonamah.

== Today ==
Modern Noonamah is mostly a rural area with much of the surrounding land being used for agriculture. There is a hotel, petrol station and general store (which also serves as the Post Office RV) located on the Stuart Highway south of the Elizabeth River bridge. North of the river is the Darwin Crocodile Farm, a commercial farm with over 7000 American alligators and native crocodiles. The farm is currently closed to the public. A number of trucking companies have facilities in the suburb for loading and transporting livestock.

There are no schools in the suburb. The nearest primary school is to the north in Bees Creek, while middle school and high school students in years 7 to 12 can travel to Taminmin High School in nearby Humpty Doo.

== Public transport ==
The Northern Territory Government provides limited bus services between Noonamah and Palmerston Monday - Saturday. Bus routes 440 and 445 pass through the suburb. These services are infrequent, generally running twice a day. In January 2012, park and ride facilities opened in nearby Coolalinga and Humpty Doo, providing a better service for commuters travelling from the rural area to Darwin.

On the day of the 2011 census, only 1.8% of employed people travelled to work on public transport and 74.1% by car (either as driver or as passenger).

== Events ==
The National Rodeo Council of Australia schedules many events in Noonamah throughout the year.

The Noonamah Tavern Rodeo

=== Climate ===
Noonamah has a tropical savanna climate (Köppen: Aw) with a wet season from November to April and a dry season from May to October. Extreme temperatures ranged from 41.6 °C (106.9 °F) on 20 October 2019 to 6.1 °C (43.0 °F) on 25 June 2023. The wettest recorded day was 28 January 2018 with 228.4 mm (8.99 in) of rainfall.

Climate data for Noonamah Airstrip (12.61°S 131.05°E) (18 m (59 ft) AMSL) (2013-2025)
Month	Jan	Feb	Mar	Apr	May	Jun	Jul	Aug	Sep	Oct	Nov	Dec	Year
Record high °C (°F)	38.9 (102.0)	37.5 (99.5)	37.2 (99.0)	37.6 (99.7)	36.8 (98.2)	35.9 (96.6)	36.7 (98.1)	38.6 (101.5)	39.7 (103.5)	41.6 (106.9)	39.8 (103.6)	39.8 (103.6)	41.6 (106.9)
Mean daily maximum °C (°F)	33.1 (91.6)	33.2 (91.8)	34.3 (93.7)	34.6 (94.3)	34.0 (93.2)	33.1 (91.6)	33.1 (91.6)	34.5 (94.1)	36.3 (97.3)	36.7 (98.1)	35.9 (96.6)	34.7 (94.5)	34.5 (94.0)
Mean daily minimum °C (°F)	24.8 (76.6)	24.7 (76.5)	24.7 (76.5)	23.4 (74.1)	20.3 (68.5)	17.8 (64.0)	16.3 (61.3)	17.2 (63.0)	21.2 (70.2)	24.0 (75.2)	24.7 (76.5)	25.1 (77.2)	22.0 (71.6)
Record low °C (°F)	20.4 (68.7)	20.9 (69.6)	18.0 (64.4)	14.8 (58.6)	11.6 (52.9)	6.5 (43.7)	6.1 (43.0)	8.0 (46.4)	11.5 (52.7)	19.1 (66.4)	20.3 (68.5)	21.3 (70.3)	6.1 (43.0)
Average precipitation mm (inches)	421.7 (16.60)	317.9 (12.52)	230.3 (9.07)	87.9 (3.46)	8.5 (0.33)	0.3 (0.01)	0.1 (0.00)	0.8 (0.03)	23.6 (0.93)	61.6 (2.43)	145.8 (5.74)	266.4 (10.49)	1,532 (60.31)
Average precipitation days (≥ 0.2 mm)	21.6	17.8	18.7	10.0	1.9	0.3	0.2	0.4	3.4	7.2	15.2	18.9	115.6
Source: Bureau of Meteorology (2013-2025)
