= Hundred of Finniss (Northern Territory) =

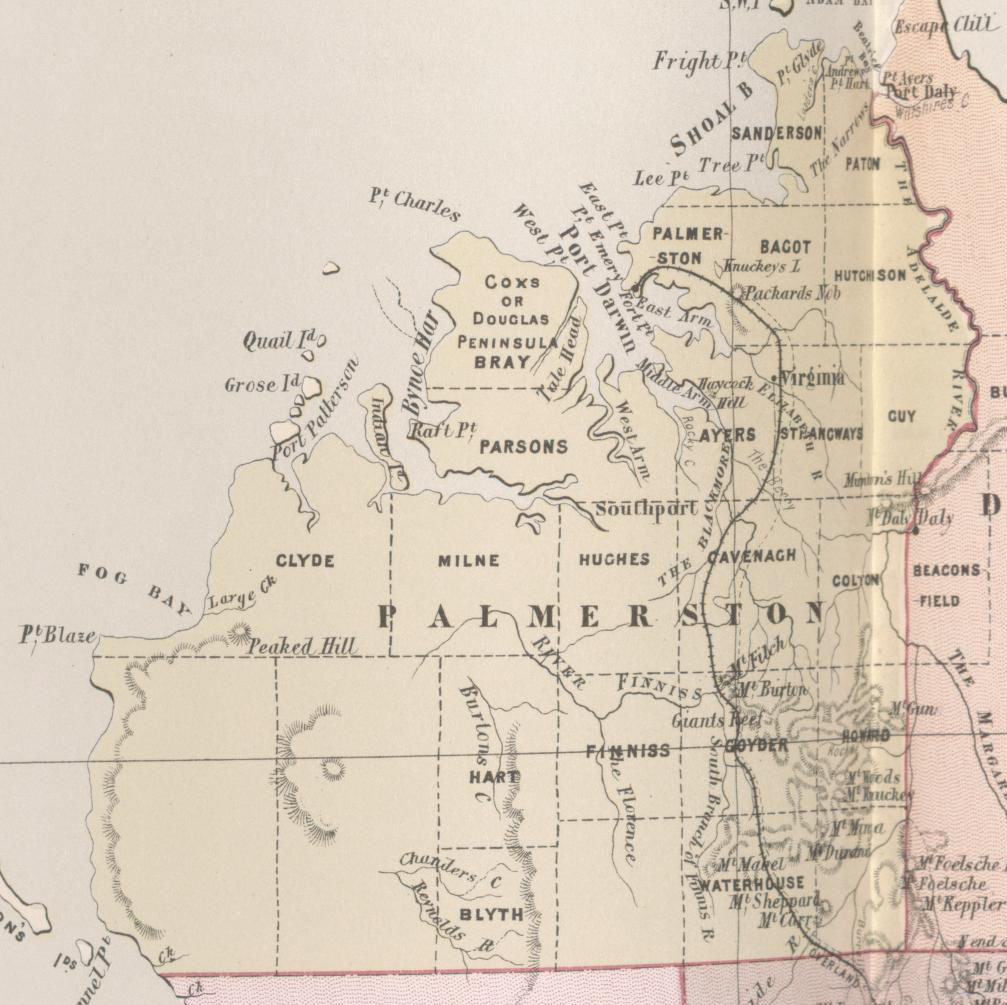
Map of Palmerston County in 1886, showing the hundreds.

The Hundred of Finniss is a hundred (administrative division) of Palmerston County, Northern Territory, Australia. It is located at latitude -13°01'S and longitude 130°48'E.

Hundred of Finniss was one of the initial 13 hundreds of Palmerston County named in 1871, and probably named after Boyle Travers Finniss.
