= Hundred of Strangways =

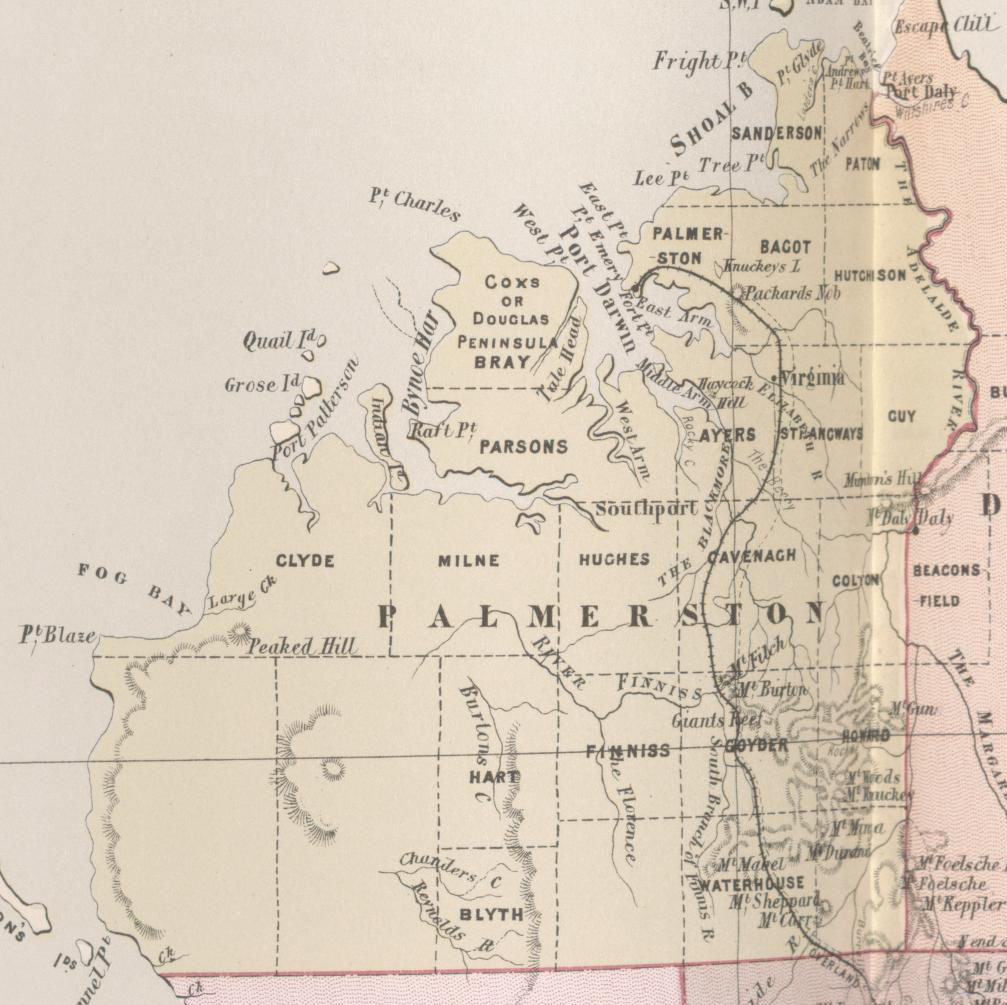
Map of Palmerston County in 1886, showing the hundreds.

The Hundred of Strangways is a hundred of Palmerston County, Northern Territory Australia.

The hundred is named after Henry Strangways, a South Australian premier in the 1860s. The hundred is located at Latitude -12°38'S, Longitude 131°04'E. and is southeast of Darwin, Northern Territory.
