= Hughes Airfield =

Airfield in Northern Territory, Australia

- IATA: none; ICAO: none

Summary
- Location: Hughes, Northern Territory
- Coordinates: 12°41′20.13″S 131°05′21.11″E

Map
- Location of airport in Northern Territory

Runways
Direction	Length		Surface
Direction	ft	m	Surface
	3,023	920	Bitume

Hughes Airfield (32 Mile) is an airfield in the Northern Territory of Australia located in the locality of Hughes. It was constructed during World War II for military use. The airfield now functions as a base for aerial firefighting aircraft to protect the outer rural suburbs of Darwin.

The airfield was built by the U.S. Army engineering unit, the 808th Engineer Aviation Battalion, from 10 March 1942 until 13 April 1942. The runway was 5,000 feet (1,500 m) long and 100 feet (30 m) wide.

== World War II use ==
=== Units based at Hughes Airfield ===
- No. 2 Squadron RAAF
- No. 13 Squadron RAAF
- No. 34 Squadron RAAF (15 July 1942 – 27 August 1942)
- No. 82 Squadron RAAF

=== Japanese Bombing Raids against Hughes Airfield ===
- 23 August 1942 (12:12 pm)
- 26 November 1942 (03.20 a.m.)
- 27 November 1942 (03:56 – 04:46 am)

== Present Day ==
On 5 September 2011, the Hughes Airfield was added to the Northern Territory Heritage Register.

On 25 January 2012, the Northern Territory Government awarded a contract to repair and resurface the airstrip to Downer EDI Works. This will better enable access to the strip for the Air Tractor AT-802 water-bombing aircraft, operated from the strip by Bushfires NT since 2009. In addition to the resurfacing works, a water tank has also been installed on site, allowing mobile pumps to be used to load firefighting aircraft.

It has been proposed that construction of the new satellite city of Weddell to the northwest should include a general aviation airport separate from Darwin International Airport. While no formal commitment to building a new general aviation facility in the Greater Darwin area has yet been made by the Northern Territory Government, the runway alignment of 11/29 at Hughes is the preferred option for such a concept.
