= Bynoe Harbour, Northern Territory =

Bynoe Harbour
- Suburb
- Coordinates: 12°38′01″S 130°32′12″E
- Country: Australia
- State: Northern Territory
- LGA: unincorporated area
- Location: 41 km (25 mi) SW of Darwin City
- Established: 4 April 2007

Government
  - Territory electorate: Daly
  - Federal division: Lingiari
- Elevation: 4 m (13 ft)

Population
  - Total: 0 (2016 census) (Note: The extent of the “state suburb” used by the Australian Bureau of Statistics only covers the islands located within the locality and not the full extent of the locality gazetted by the Northern Territory Government.)
- Time zone: UTC+9:30 (ACST)
- Postcode: 0822
- Mean max temp: 32.1 °C (89.8 °F)
- Mean min temp: 23.2 °C (73.8 °F)
- Annual rainfall: 1,779.7 mm (70.07 in)
Suburbs around Bynoe Harbour
Beagle Gulf	Beagle Gulf; Cox Peninsula	Cox Peninsula
Beagle Gulf	Bynoe Harbour	Cox Peninsula
Dundee Beach	Dundee Beach; Dundee Forest; Bynoe	Bynoe
- Locations; Adjoining localities

Bynoe Harbour, also Scooma Bay, is a locality in the Northern Territory of Australia located about 41 kilometres (25 mi) south-west of the territory capital of Darwin.

Bynoe Harbour consists of the full extent of the natural harbour of Bynoe Harbour which extends in an easterly direction into the mainland forming one of the sides of the Cox Peninsula and which is enclosed to the west by a spit consisting of a number of islands including Quail Island at the spit's northern end. The mouth of the natural harbour opens to the north into Beagle Gulf. The locality is bounded to the north by a line running across the harbour's mouth from Birge Point on the Cox Peninsula in the east via the northern tip of Indian Island to Quail Island in the west and bounded in the west by a line from Quail Island in the north to Point Paterson in the locality of Dundee Beach in the south. The western boundary passes on the west of the spit which includes Dum In Mirrie Island. The locality's name derived from the natural harbour and ultimately from Benjamin Bynoe, the surgeon and naturalist who served on HMS Beagle on its third voyage. Its boundaries and name were gazetted on 4 April 2007.

The 2016 Australian census which was conducted in August 2016 reports that Bynoe Harbour had no people living within its boundaries.

Bynoe Harbour is located within the federal division of Lingiari, the territory electoral division of Daly and within the unincorporated areas of the Northern Territory.

== Geography ==
The full extent of Indian Island which located within the natural harbour is occupied by a protected area called the Indian Island Conservation Area. Dum In Mirrie Island has an airfield known as the Dum In Mirrie Airstrip where an automatic weather station has been in operation since 1994.

=== Climate ===
The airstrip has a tropical savanna climate (Köppen: Aw) with a wet season from November to April and a dry season from May to October. Extreme temperatures ranged from 38.1 °C (100.6 °F) on 21 September 2021 to 10.0 °C (50.0 °F) on 15 June 2011. The wettest recorded day was 11 January 2020 with 562.0 mm (22.13 in) of rainfall.

Climate data for Dum In Mirrie Airstrip (12.64°S 130.37°E) (4 m (13 ft) AMSL) (1994-2025)
Month	Jan	Feb	Mar	Apr	May	Jun	Jul	Aug	Sep	Oct	Nov	Dec	Year
Record high °C (°F)	35.0 (95.0)	34.9 (94.8)	35.6 (96.1)	37.0 (98.6)	36.9 (98.4)	35.0 (95.0)	35.5 (95.9)	37.1 (98.8)	38.1 (100.6)	38.0 (100.4)	37.0 (98.6)	36.8 (98.2)	38.1 (100.6)
Mean daily maximum °C (°F)	31.8 (89.2)	31.6 (88.9)	32.1 (89.8)	33.2 (91.8)	32.5 (90.5)	30.9 (87.6)	30.5 (86.9)	31.0 (87.8)	32.1 (89.8)	33.0 (91.4)	33.3 (91.9)	32.7 (90.9)	32.1 (89.7)
Mean daily minimum °C (°F)	25.6 (78.1)	25.5 (77.9)	25.3 (77.5)	24.3 (75.7)	21.7 (71.1)	18.9 (66.0)	18.0 (64.4)	19.1 (66.4)	22.8 (73.0)	25.4 (77.7)	25.9 (78.6)	26.1 (79.0)	23.2 (73.8)
Record low °C (°F)	21.0 (69.8)	22.0 (71.6)	20.0 (68.0)	16.3 (61.3)	12.7 (54.9)	10.0 (50.0)	10.7 (51.3)	11.7 (53.1)	13.6 (56.5)	19.0 (66.2)	21.3 (70.3)	21.5 (70.7)	10.0 (50.0)
Average precipitation mm (inches)	426.2 (16.78)	403.1 (15.87)	307.5 (12.11)	98.1 (3.86)	20.1 (0.79)	2.7 (0.11)	1.3 (0.05)	2.7 (0.11)	18.7 (0.74)	61.6 (2.43)	137.9 (5.43)	281.1 (11.07)	1,779.7 (70.07)
Average precipitation days (≥ 0.2 mm)	19.9	17.9	19.9	9.5	2.3	0.6	0.1	0.9	2.9	6.9	11.1	15.3	107.3
Average afternoon relative humidity (%)	75	76	71	59	48	42	48	50	60	62	65	70	61
Average dew point °C (°F)	25.0 (77.0)	25.0 (77.0)	24.5 (76.1)	21.9 (71.4)	17.9 (64.2)	14.4 (57.9)	15.4 (59.7)	16.7 (62.1)	21.3 (70.3)	23.0 (73.4)	24.1 (75.4)	24.7 (76.5)	21.2 (70.1)
Source: Bureau of Meteorology (1994-2025)
