= Hundred of Milne (Northern Territory) =

Cadastral hundred in Palmerston County, Northern Territory

- Cadastral division
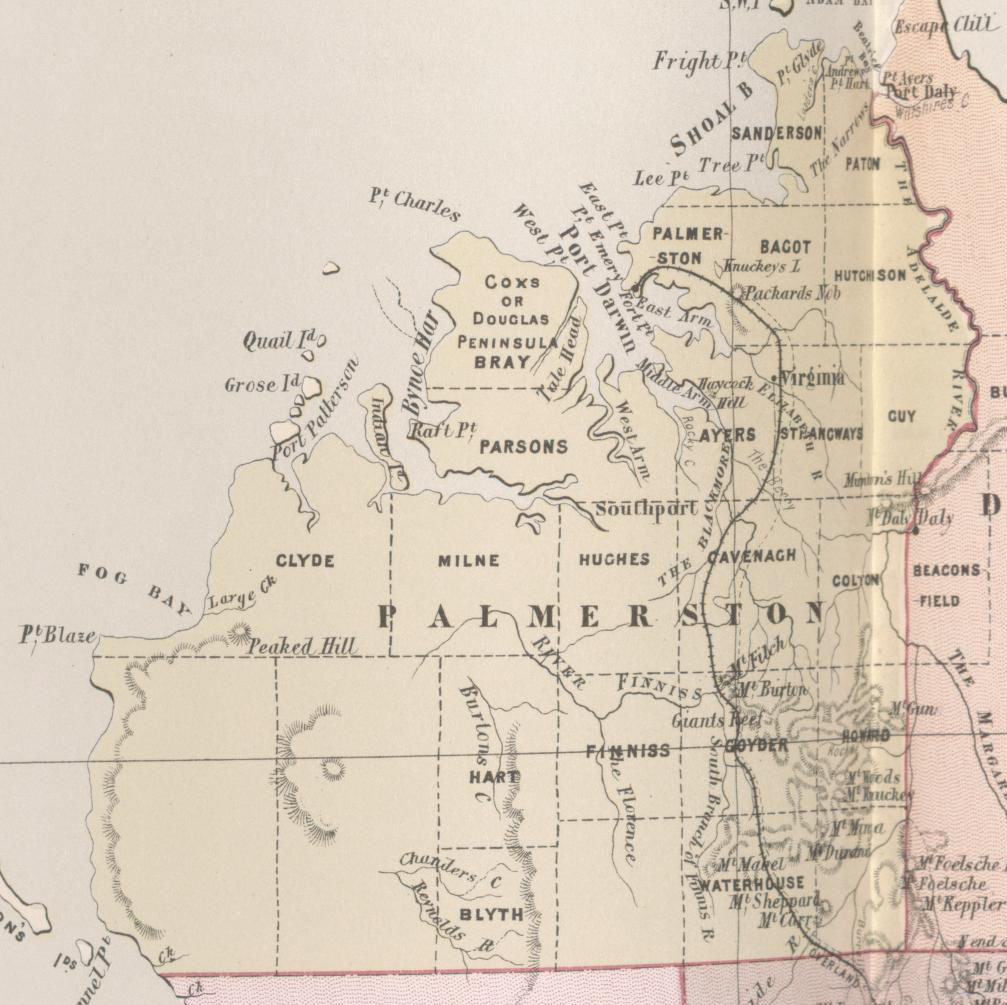
- Map of Palmerston County in 1886 showing the Hundred of Milne spanning the upper Finniss River

- Coordinates: 12°48′S 130°36′E
- Country: Australia
- State: Northern Territory
- Established: 1871
- Named after: Sir William Milne

The Hundred of Milne is a cadastral unit of hundred in Palmerston County, Northern Territory, Australia.

Bounded on the north by the Bynoe Harbour, the hundred was one of the first 13 hundreds gazetted in the territory in 1871, and was named after Sir William Milne, a Glasgow-born politician of South Australia. Milne carried a bill in the council authorising the construction of the Australian Overland Telegraph Line from Adelaide to Darwin.
