= Roseberry County, Northern Territory =

County of Roseberry
- Cadastral division
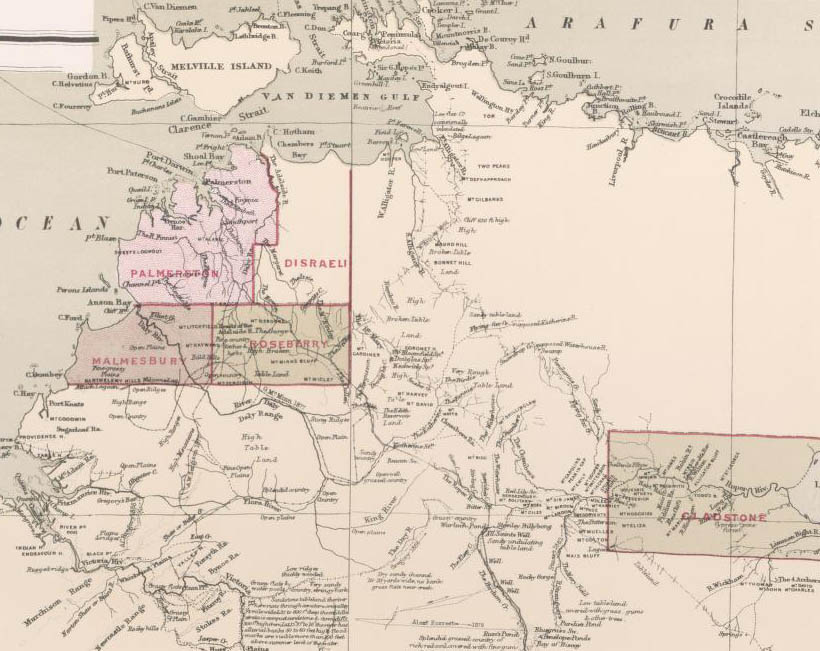
- 1886 map showing the small part of the Northern Territory subdivided into five counties

- Coordinates: 13°37′0″S 131°26′0″E
- Country: Australia
- State: Northern Territory
- Established: 15 July 1885

Roseberry County is one of the five counties in the Northern Territory which are part of the cadastral divisions of Australia. The County of Rosebery was gazetted on 15 July 1885 and covered the area north of Pine Creek. The county was not subdivided into hundreds.

The County of Rosebery fell into disuse on 7 January 1977.

== County name ==
Like the other counties of the Northern Territory, Roseberry is named for a British prime minister. In this case Roseberry County is named after the Fifth Earl of Rosebery, Archibald Philip Primrose, who was visiting the colony of South Australia at the time of the creation of the county and who a decade later became the prime minister of the United Kingdom.
