= Palmerston County =

Palmerston Northern Territory
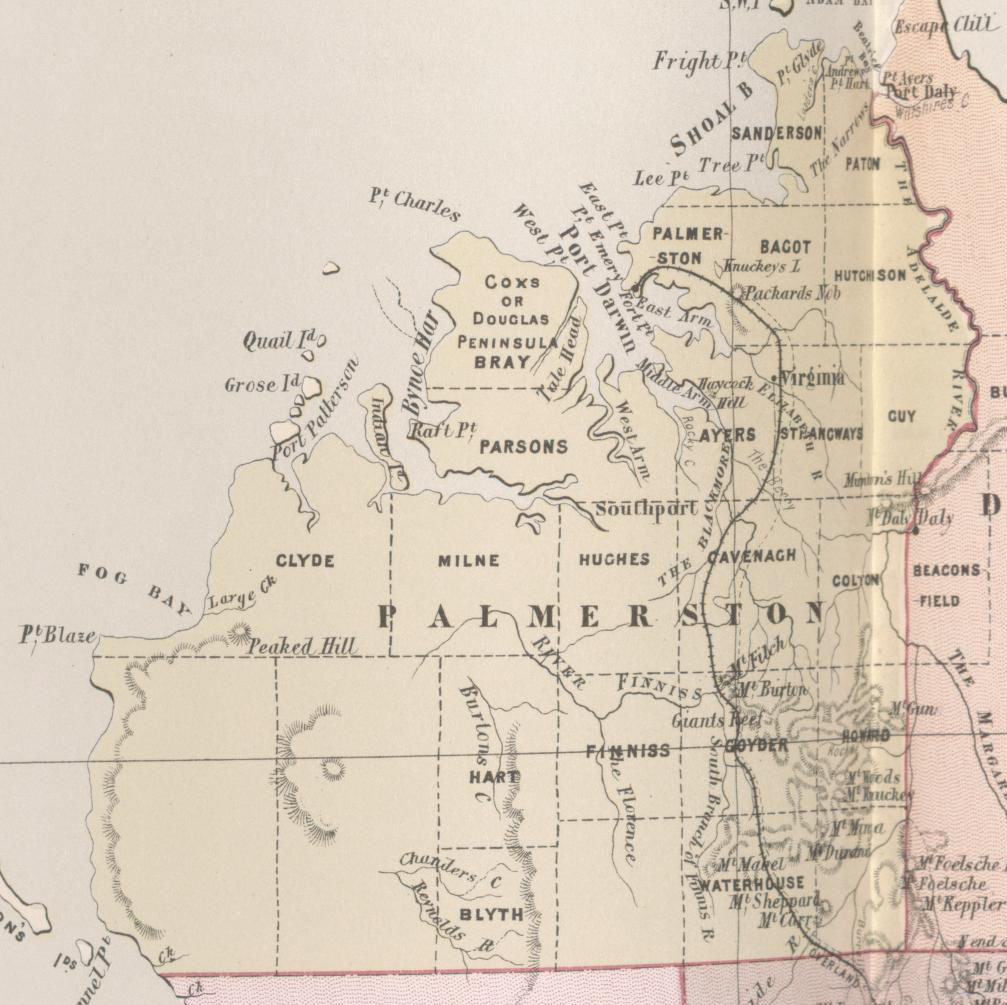
- Map of Palmerston County in 1886 showing the hundreds

- Coordinates: 12°51′18″S 130°44′42″E
- Established: 14 September 1871
Lands administrative divisions around Palmerston:
Timor Sea	Beagle Gulf	Van Diemen Gulf
Timor Sea	Palmerston	Disraeli
Timor Sea	Malmesbury	Roseberry
- Footnotes: Adjoining counties

Palmerston County is one of the five counties in the Northern Territory of Australia which are part of the Lands administrative divisions of Australia. It contains the city of Darwin. It was proclaimed on 14 September 1871 and divided into hundreds. Being on the northern coast of the territory, it is bounded on the north and west by sea, the Adelaide River on the east and on the south by a line at longitude approximately 13°15' south (from a point adjacent to the southernmost of the Peron Islands to the township of Adelaide River).

== Hundreds ==
- Sanderson
- Paton
- Palmerston
- Bagot
- Hutchison
- Bray
- Parsons
- Ayers
- Strangways
- Guy
- Glyde
- Milne
- Hughes
- Cavenagh
- Colton
- Hart
- Finniss
- Goyder
- Howard
- Blyth
- Waterhouse
