= Hundred of Blyth (Northern Territory) =

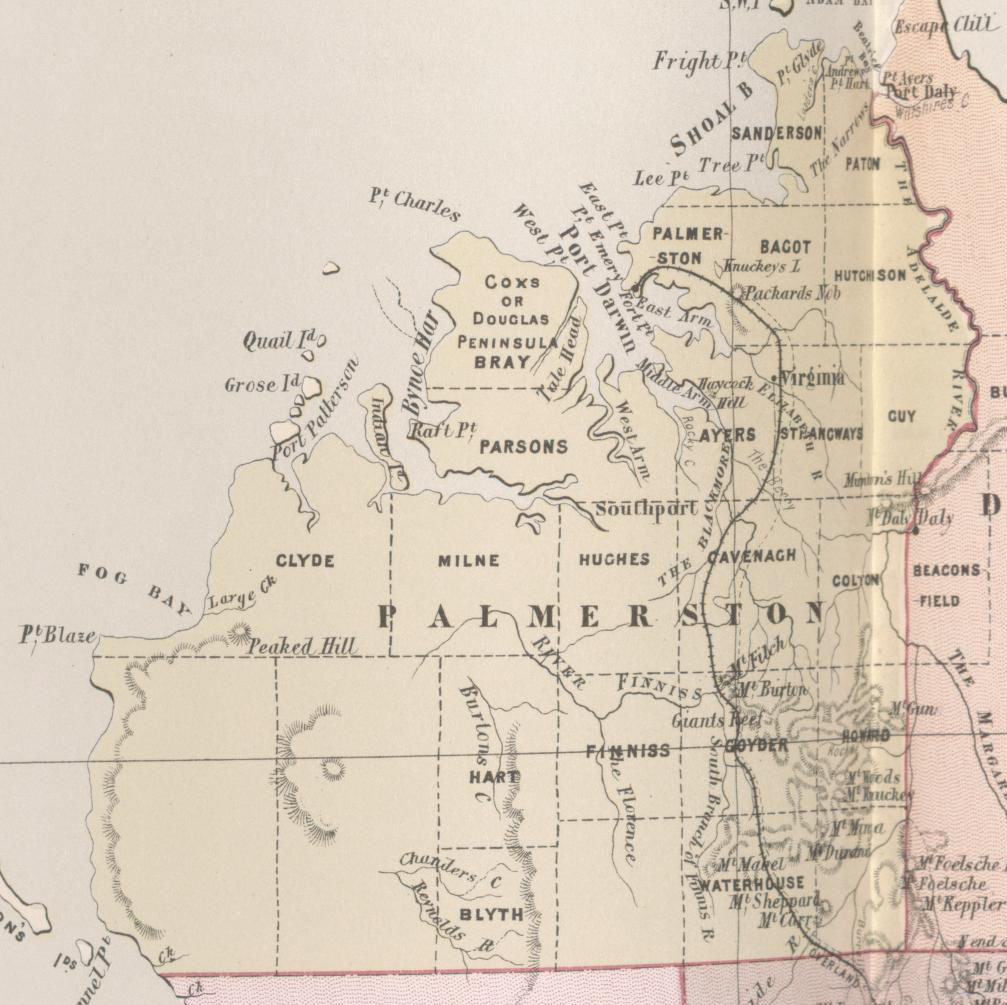
Map of Palmerston County in 1886, showing the hundreds.

The Hundred of Blyth is a hundred of Palmerston County, Northern Territory, Australia.

The hundred is located at -13°12' S, 130°39' E, was gazetted on 14 September 1871 was named for Arthur Blyth.
