= Berry Springs =

Suburb in Northern Territory, Australia

- Suburb
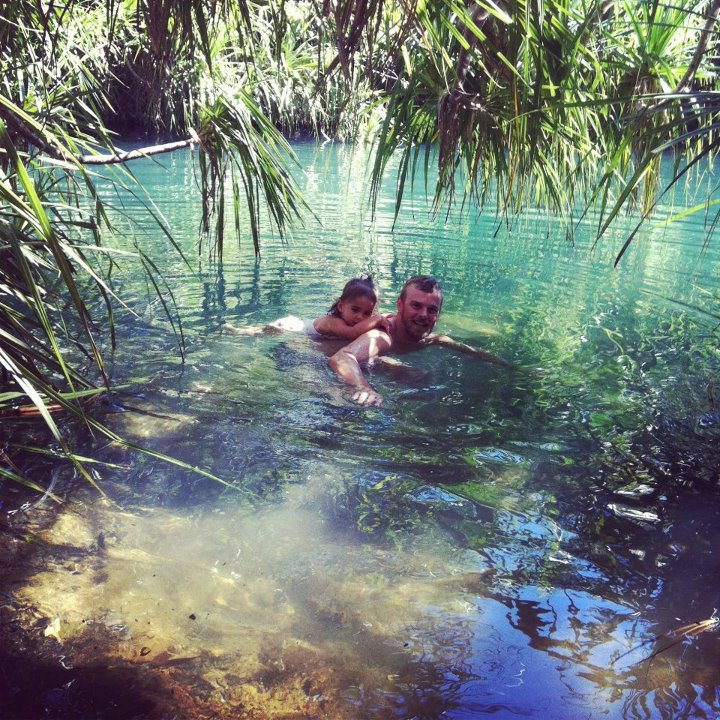
- A quiet pool, at the Lower Pool of Berry Springs swimming holes

- Interactive map of Berry Springs
- Coordinates: 12°43′19″S 131°00′37″E
- Country: Australia
- State: Northern Territory
- City: Darwin
- LGA: Litchfield Municipality
- Location: 57.5 km (35.7 mi) from Darwin; 38.5 km (23.9 mi) from Palmerston

Government
  - Territory electorate: Daly
  - Federal division: Lingiari

Population
  - Total: 818 (2016 census)
- Postcode: 0838
Suburbs around Berry Springs
Blackmore	Weddell	Noonamah
Blackmore; Southport; Tumbling Waters	Berry Springs	Livingstone
Darwin River	Darwin River	Livingstone; Darwin River

Berry Springs in 1946

Berry Springs is a locality in the Northern Territory of Australia. The locality is a mostly rural area situated on the Cox Peninsula Road and is sparsely populated. A few businesses and a school are located in the locality. In the 2016 census, the population of Berry Springs was 818. It is located 58.5 kilometres (36.4 mi) by road from the Darwin central business district and lies within the Litchfield Municipality local government area.

== History ==
The location is known as Laniyuk by the Indigenous Kungarakany people. The name Berry Springs derives from Berry Creek, named by the Surveyor General of South Australia, George Goyder, in 1870, after his chief draftsman, Edwin Berry. Most early development of the area was concentrated around the thriving town of Southport at the confluence of the Blackmore and Darwin Rivers. In 1889, a station named Southport opened on the North Australia Railway, on the road between that town and Berry Springs. The location soon declined in importance however.

During World War II, over 100,000 service personnel were deployed to the Litchfield area. A low weir was built across Berry Creek to provide a swimming pool as part of a rest and recreation camp for troops, and it is still a popular swimming venue.

== Economy ==
A 14-hectare (35-acre) aquaculture complex, known as ARDA-Tek Barramundi Farm was established in 1998 in the locality. It employs three full-time staff. In addition to supplying fish for seafood wholesale, there is a research program aimed at managing disease and creating cheaper, high protein food sources to increase the quality of the fingerlings produced by the farm. The farm offers recreational fishing and tours for visitors, further contributing to tourism and the local economy.

== Infrastructure ==
=== Education ===
There is one public primary school located in Berry Springs, Berry Springs Primary School. The school caters to students in Transition to Year 6. A pre-school also operates on the site. There were 217 students enrolled as of August 2010. The current principal is Leah Crockford.

There are no secondary schools in the suburb, but the Darwin rural area is served by Taminmin College in Humpty Doo for students studying in Years 7–12.

== Attractions ==
The Territory Wildlife Park is a zoo located in the locality.

The Berry Springs Nature Park is a public recreation area that includes bushwalking trails, picnic areas and a kiosk where refreshments are available. The park is centred on the springs and catchment which are the source of water for Berry Creek. The clear waters of the pools created by the springs are ideal for observing the aquatic life within, and access is provided for swimming to escape the tropical heat. Information displays are provided detailing the native plants, wildlife and history of the area. The park is open all year round, but during the months of October – April may be closed for swimming depending on local conditions.
