= Wagait Shire =

- Local government area
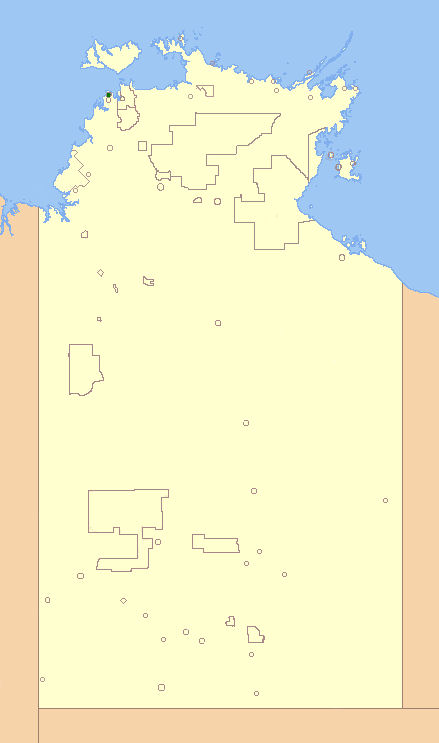
- Location of Wagait Shire

- Interactive map of Wagait Shire
- Coordinates: 12.4501°S 130.7401°E
- Country: Australia
- State: Northern Territory
- Region: outer Darwin
- Established: 1995
- Council seat: Wagait Beach

Government
  - President: Peter Clee
  - Territory electorate: Daly
  - Federal division: Lingiari

Area
  - Total: 5.6 km^{2} (2.2 sq mi)

Population
  - Total: 508 (2018)
  - Density: 90.7/km^{2} (234.9/sq mi)
- Website: Wagait Shire
LGAs around Wagait Shire
Timor Sea	Timor Sea	Timor Sea
	Wagait Shire	Darwin
	Belyuen Shire	Palmerston

The Wagait Shire is a local government area in the Northern Territory of Australia. The council was established as the Cox Peninsula Community Government Council on 28 April 1995 and renamed with effect from 1 July 2008. The shire is located west of Darwin, as a 15-minute ferry ride, or a 138 kilometres (86 mi) drive on fully sealed roads.

The council derived its previous name from the Cox Peninsula. It was named after Matthew Dillon Cox, regarded as the Northern Territory's first pastoralist, who applied for a lease over the peninsula in 1869, just after the establishment of Darwin. The current name is derived from the name of the township located near Wagait Beach.

The Federal electorate of Lingiari https://www.aec.gov.au/profiles/nt/lingiari.htm

== Suburbs ==
Suburb	Population	Map
Wagait Beach	422 (SAL 2021)	
Mandorah	0 (SAL 2016)	

== See also ==
- Local Government Areas of the Northern Territory
