= Coomalie =

Coomalie may refer to:

- Coomalie Shire, a local government area in the Northern Territory of Australia
- Coomalie pin, a common name for the damselfly species, Eurysticta coomalie

== See also ==
- Coomalie Creek, Northern Territory
- Coomalie Creek Airfield
