= Arch Grant =

Australian minister and historian (1911–2005)

Arch Grant, likely standing in front of the John Flynn Memorial Church in Alice Springs

Archibald Wesley Grant, almost universally known as Arch Grant, BEM (5 February 1911 – 21 February 2005) was a minister, army chaplain and historian that spent much of his life in the Northern Territory of Australia.

== Early life ==
Grant was born at Timaru in New Zealand and was the son of Livesy and Eliza Grant and he attended his early schooling in that area. When he was in high school the family immigrated to Australia where they settled in Gosford in New South Wales.

After completing his schooling Grant worked in the motor industry and as a cinema projectionist until in 1934 he was accepted as a candidate of the Presbyterian ministry and he studied under the 'Home Mission Scheme' and attended St Andrew's Theological College in Sydney. He was ordained as a minister on 22 November 1939 in October 1939.

Shortly before receiving his license, on 9 September 1939, he married Erla Bullock and together they would have four children; two sons and two daughters.

== Life in the Northern Territory ==
After being ordained Grant was called to work for the Australian Inland Mission in Tennant Creek (Jurnkkurakurr) and, to take up this role, he and Erla departed from Sydney on 1 December 1939 and, from Alice Springs (Mparntwe) they were assisted by Kingsley Partridge who drove them the final length. They arrived on 10 December 1939 and lived in a room they built of the side of the AIM Welfare Hut. In Tennant Creek his primary goal was to provide for the spiritual needs and general welfare of the miners living there and their families.

During World War II the Commonwealth government undertook major upgrades to the Stuart Highway with major construction between Tennant Creek and Birdum and, to assist, Grant enlisted as a part-time Army chaplain and ministered to the workers and troops as they passed through. He also did so when the Barkly Highway was constructed, from Tennant Creek to Mount Isa in 1941.

When Japan entered the war Grant became a full-time chaplain and was relocated to Darwin (Garramilla) while his family headed south for safety and to address the health concerns of one of his daughters. In February 1942 he was appointed the area chaplain at Adelaide River where, after the bombing of Darwin we helped with the care and welfare of evacuees from Darwin; he also selected the site of the Adelaide River War Cemetery and conducted several burials there. Additionally he assisted in the relocation of the 119 Army General Hospital.

In Adelaide River he also established on open air cinema for the troops which he ran for a while by himself and he would run two double feature shows a week to huge audiences. The cinema was moved as it was too dangerous to hold in Darwin as its lights may attract attention from bombers.

Between 1943 and 1945 Grant served in other parts of Australia and overseas until returning to Darwin in 1945 and in 1946 he took his discharge from the Army. By April 1946 Grant was back in Darwin serving as a Presbyterian member, now with his family alongside him, while Darwin was rebuilt following the war. Soon after, alongside The Reverends CD Alcorn and John Flynn, formed the United Church of North Australia.

Between 1950 and 1955 Grant was a minister in Bankstown, in Sydney, however between 1955 and 1959 he returned to the Northern Territory to be the minister at the newly constructed John Flynn Memorial Church in Alice Springs. While serving in this role he assisted in organising a health survey of Aboriginal people living in the region and for the delivery of polio vaccines to children.

== Later life ==
In 1960 he returned again to Sydney where he became the minister at churches in Fairfield and Haberfield until his retirement in 1977. In 1965 he was the president of the National Aborigines Day Observance Committee.

In the 1970s he was named as the first defendant in a court case opposing the unification of the Uniting Church in Australia and despite the case being unsuccessful Grant found the legal proceedings traumatic.

In 1978 he was awarded the British Empire Medal (BEM).

He maintained an active interest in the Northern Territory and, in retirement, published a number of books on the history of Methodists and Presbyterians there. He was a long-standing member of the Historical Society of the Northern Territory.

He died on 21 February 2005 and was predeceased by his wife.

== Publications ==
- Camel Train and Aeroplane: the story of Skipper Partridge (1981).
- Palmerston to Darwin: 75 years service on the frontier (1990).
- Australia's frontline matron: Edith McQuade White (1992); about Edith Alexandra White.
- Aliens in Arnhem Land (1995).

He also published several entries in the Northern Territory Dictionary of Biography and the Journal of Northern Territory History.

Grant's papers are also available through the National Library of Australia.

A number of oral history recordings of Grant are available through Library & Archives NT.
