= Goyder =

Goyder may refer to:

== People ==
- Alice Kirkby Goyder (1875–1964), English artist
- George Goyder (1826–1898), Surveyor General of South Australia
- Joe Goyder (1907–1986), English boxer
- Mark Goyder (born 1953), English author and CEO
- Richard Goyder (born 1960), Australian businessman
- Margot Goyder and Ann Neville Joske née Goyder, who wrote as Margot Neville

== Places in Australia ==
=== Northern Territory ===
- Goyder River
- Electoral division of Goyder, for rural areas south of Darwin
- Hundred of Goyder (Northern Territory), a cadastral division

=== South Australia ===
- Goyder, South Australia
  - Hundred of Goyder, a cadastral division
- Regional Council of Goyder, a local government area in the Mid North region
- Electoral district of Goyder, a rural electorate located on the Yorke Peninsula

== See also ==
- Goyder crater in Northern Territory, Australia
- Goyder Highway, South Australia
- Goyder Institute for Water Research
- Goyder Lagoon, South Australia
- Goyder's Line, a boundary delineating a climate zone in South Australia
