= Tropical Low Fletcher =

Australian tropical low in 2014

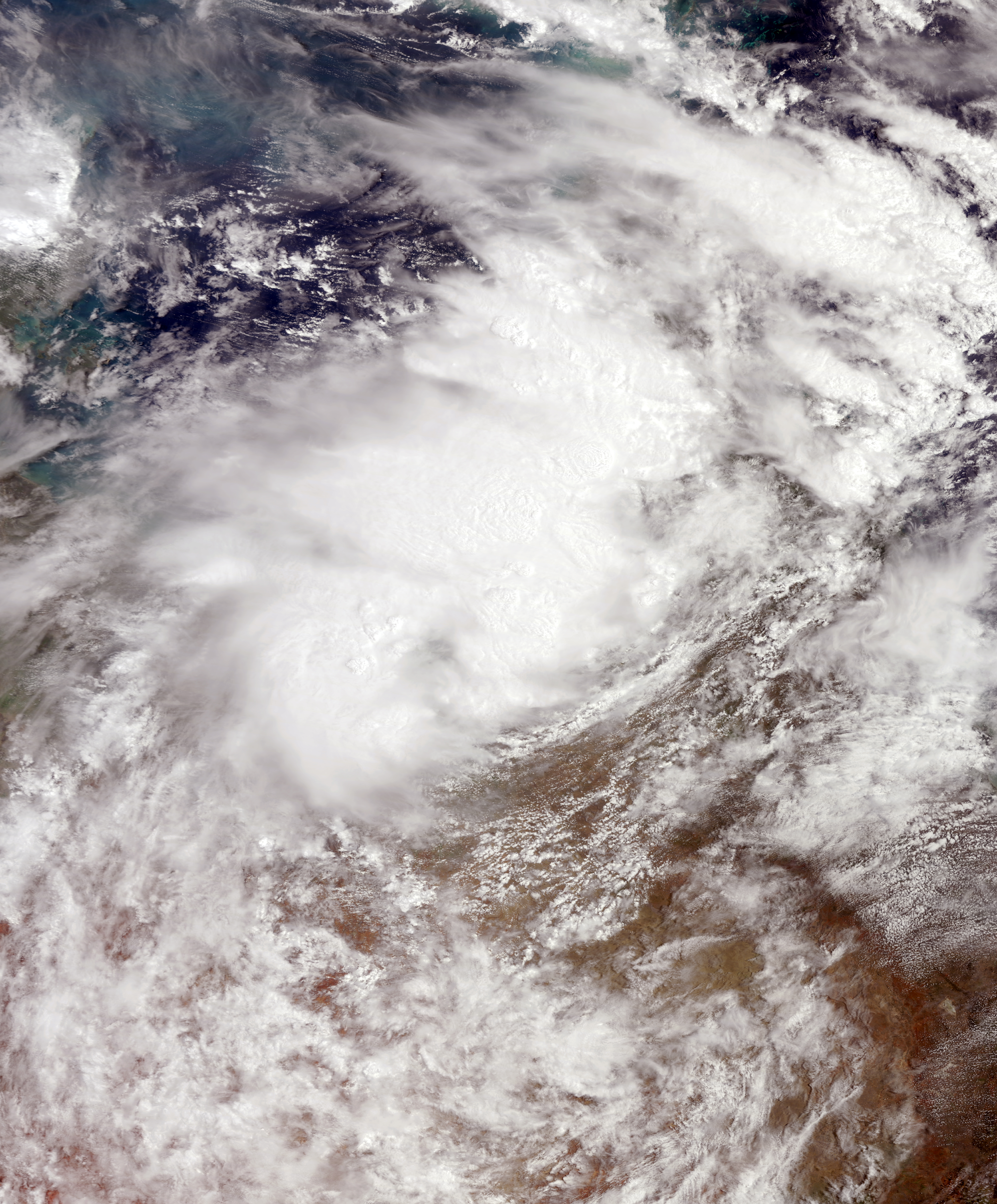
- Cyclone Fletcher near peak intensity on 3 February

Meteorological history
- Formed: 30 January 2014
- Dissipated: 12 February 2014

Tropical low
- 10-minute sustained (BOM)
- Highest winds: 55 km/h (35 mph)
- Lowest pressure: 995 hPa (mbar); 29.38 inHg

Overall effects
- Fatalities: None
- Damage: None
- Areas affected: Northern Territory, Queensland
- IBTrACS
- Part of the 2013–14 Australian region cyclone season

Tropical Low Fletcher was a weak system that produced torrential rains over parts of Queensland, Australia in February 2014. Originating as tropical low over the Timor Sea on 30 January, Fletcher quickly became an organised system as it moved over the Top End region of the Northern Territory. Once over the Gulf of Carpentaria on 2 February, deep convection formed near its center and the following day it became a tropical cyclone. With peak winds estimated at 65 km/h (40 mph), the storm made landfall in Queensland before weakening to a low. Over the following week, the system's movement became slow and erratic. Executing three loops, the former cyclone meandered over the southeastern Gulf of Carpentaria before accelerating southwest and later west. Fletcher was last noted on 12 February over the Alice Springs District in the Northern Territory.

== Meteorological history ==
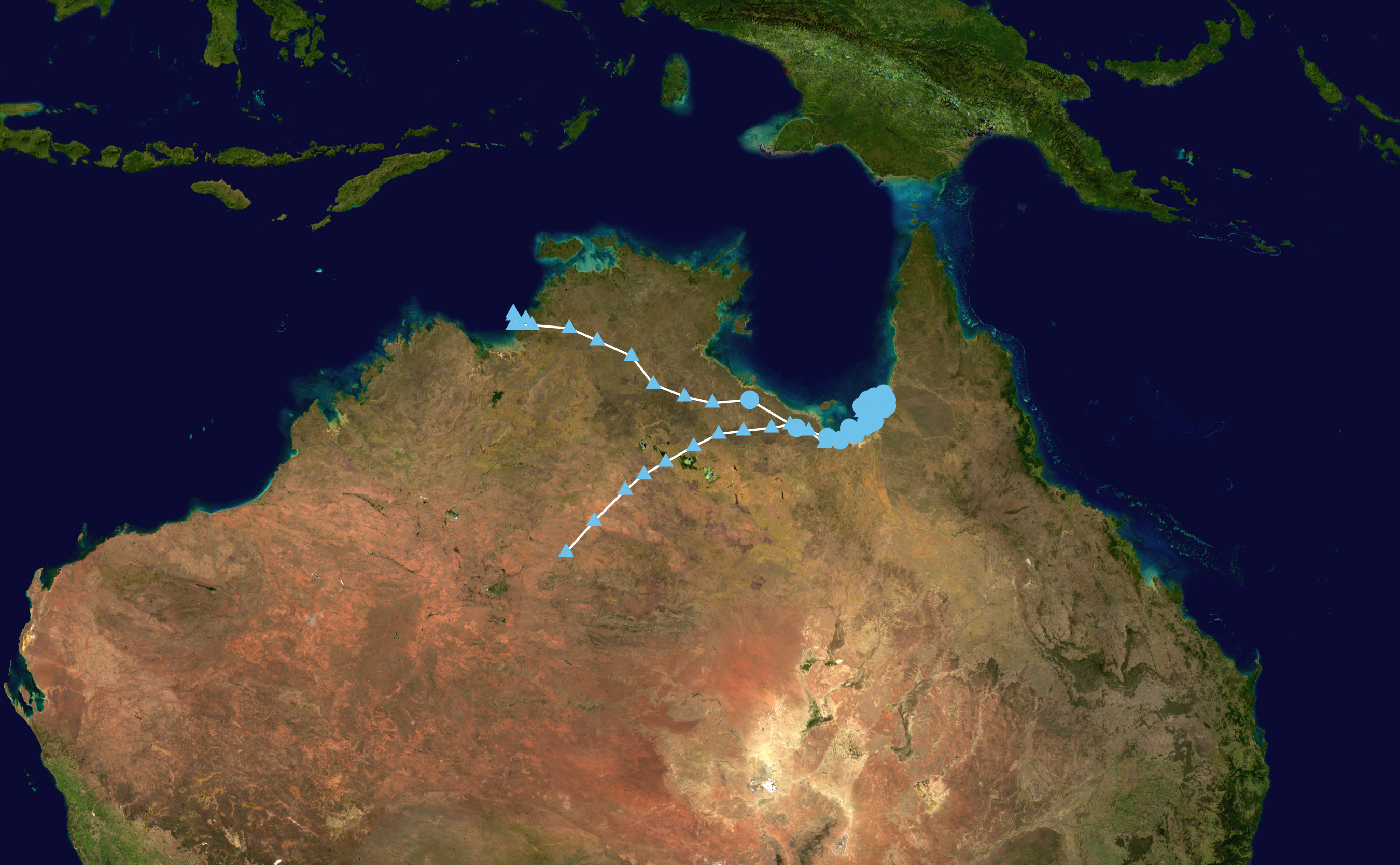
Map plotting the storm's track and intensity, according to the Saffir–Simpson scale Map key Saffir–Simpson scale Tropical depression (≤38 mph, ≤62 km/h) Tropical storm (39–73 mph, 63–118 km/h) Category 1 (74–95 mph, 119–153 km/h) Category 2 (96–110 mph, 154–177 km/h) Category 3 (111–129 mph, 178–208 km/h) Category 4 (130–156 mph, 209–251 km/h) Category 5 (≥157 mph, ≥252 km/h) Unknown Storm type Tropical cyclone Subtropical cyclone Extratropical cyclone, remnant low, tropical disturbance, or monsoon depression

Tropical Cyclone Fletcher was first identified as a tropical low on 30 January 2014 over the Joseph Bonaparte Gulf in the Timor Sea, which the BoM designated as 08U. Tracking generally eastward, the well-organized system moved over the Top End region of the Northern Territory of Australia. Westerly monsoonal flow from the north promoted a steady east-southeast track, Early on 2 February, the low emerged over the Gulf of Carpentaria near the Northern Territory–Queensland border. Moderate to strong wind shear produced by an upper-level low to the south initially inhibited development, keeping convective activity limited to isolated bursts around an exposed low-level circulation. Throughout 2 February, environmental conditions quickly turned more favorable for tropical cyclogenesis, with a newly formed anticyclone over the low lessening shear. As a result, convection steadily increased in coverage and organisation despite the system's proximity to land. Improved radar presentation and surface observations of near-gale winds prompted the Bureau of Meteorology (BOM) to upgrade the system to a tropical cyclone early on 3 February; coincidingly, they assigned the name Fletcher to the storm. At this time, the center of the small storm was located a few dozen kilometres north of Karumba, Queensland. The BOM estimated sustained winds to be 65 km/h (40 mph) and the barometric pressure at 992 hPa (29.29 inHg), which proved to be Fletcher's peak intensity.

Contrary to the BOM, the Joint Typhoon Warning Center (JTWC) maintained the system as a tropical disturbance with one-minute sustained winds estimated at 55 km/h (35 mph) and a pressure of 998 hPa (29.47 inHg). A Tropical Cyclone Formation Alert was issued by the agency on 3 February, but no advisories were ultimately issued. Fletcher only lasted as a tropical cyclone for a few hours before being downgraded to a tropical low as it made landfall in Queensland later on 3 February, between Karumba and the mouth of the Gilbert River. Once onshore, Fletcher's motion became slow and highly erratic as a building mid-level ridge to the south prompted a more westerly track. On 4 February, the storm executed a tight clockwise loop before turning westward back over the Gulf of Carpentaria on 5 February. During this time, convection became displaced to the northwest while the circulation center was left exposed. The former cyclone gradually became more monsoonal in nature, with convection developing along a convergence line rather than in curved banding features. The poorly organised system became difficult to follow, though a small central dense overcast feature along the south side of its center allowed forecasters to discern its location.

Despite moving back over water on 5 February and environmental conditions favoring redevelopment, convection failed to form around the low and instead, continued to flare along the convergence zone to the north. The remnant system then became nearly stationary just offshore for two days before adopting a slow north-northeasterly track. Early on 8 February, Fletcher brushed the Queensland coast just north of the mouth of the Gilbert River before accelerating southwestward. After completing two loops in its track, the system subsequently made its final landfall to the east of Burketown, Queensland on 9 February. As the storm passed close to the town, a pressure of 997 hPa (29.44 inHg) was observed along with wind gusts of up to 65 km/h (40 mph). Maintaining a general westward track, the remnants of Fletcher gradually weakened and were last noted on 12 February over the Alice Springs District in the Northern Territory.

== Preparations and impact ==
Wettest tropical cyclones and their remnants in Australia Highest-known totals
Precipitation			Storm	Location	Ref.
Rank	mm	in	Storm	Location	Ref.
1	2,252	88.66	Jasper 2023	Bairds	
2	1,947	76.65	Peter 1979	Mount Bellenden Ker	
3	1,870	73.62	Rona 1999	Mount Bellenden Ker	
4	1,318	51.89	Wanda 1974	Mount Glorious	
5	1,256.8	49.48	Fletcher 2014	Kowanyama	
6	1,111	43.74	Alfred 2025	Upper Springbrook	
7	1,082	42.60	Aivu 1989	Dalrymple Heights	
8	1,065	41.93	May 1998	Burketown	
9	1,000	39.37	Justin 1997	Willis Island	
10	1,000	39.37	Ellie 2009		

=== Northern Territory ===
As the precursor tropical low to Cyclone Fletcher produced heavy rains across much of the Top End region in late January and early February, the BOM issued flood advisories for the Darwin-Daly Districts. Squalls associated with the low raised concerns over abnormally high tides, namely the potential for beach erosion and coastal flooding. The Northern Territory Government launched a trial run of an early-warning phone system during this event. Residents in the Rapid Creek catchment were notified via mobile device about the possibility of flooding from the storm.

Over the Adelaide River catchment, 150 to 200 mm (5.9 to 7.9 in) fell causing the river to exceed major flood level in the town of Adelaide River on 1 February. Rising to 12.5 m (41 ft), the river inundated mostly rural areas, including a cattle farm in Mount Bundy Station where a calf had to be rescued by boat. Along the Douglas River, 247 mm (9.7 in) of rain fell over three days. Minor to moderate flooding also occurred along the Katherine and Daly Rivers. Darwin experienced several days of heavy rains and squally winds from the system, with accumulations reaching 125.8 mm (4.95 in) and gusts peaking at 80 km/h (50 mph) on 31 January.

More than a week later, the remnants produced further rains across southern areas of the state. Roughly 100 to 150 mm (3.9 to 5.9 in) of rain fell across the Roper-McArthur and Victoria river districts, leading to significant water level rise. Moderate flooding took place in Kalkarindji along the Victoria River on 12–13 February while low-lying areas along the McArthur River in Borroloola flooded on both 10 and 13 February. Along the Northern Territory–Queensland border, 214.7 mm (8.45 in) fell in Wollogorang. As the remnants passed near Tennant Creek, wind gusts reached 65 km/h (40 mph), though rainfall was fairly limited with only 17 mm (0.67 in) falling.

=== Queensland ===
Owing to a wetter-than-average January, cattle herders in Queensland moved their herds to higher ground.

During the time in which Fletcher became nearly stationary over the southeastern Gulf of Carpentaria, it produced prolonged and heavy rains across much of western Queensland. Many areas experienced a week of continuous rainfall, with Kowanyama measuring at least 100 mm (3.9 in) for six days straight, including a daily peak of 361.2 mm (14.22 in). Total rains from Fletcher's passage amounted to 1,256.8 mm (49.48 in) over an eight-day span. These rains greatly contributed to making February 2014 the wettest month on record in Kowanyama, with 1,470.6 mm (57.90 in) ultimately recorded. Normanton, situated near where Fletcher made landfall on 3 February, saw considerably less rainfall, with total accumulations of 187 mm (7.4 in). Mornington Island also experienced considerably less rainfall, with 189 mm (7.4 in) falling over 11 days. On 2 February, as Fletcher passed south of the island, wind gusts peaked at 63 km/h (39 mph). In Far North Queensland, near-gale to gale-force wind gusts affected coastal areas around Weipa for three days; a maximum gust of 65 km/h (40 mph) was measured on 5 February. A total of 583.2 mm (22.96 in) of rain fell in Weipa as both Fletcher and the nearby monsoon brought continuous moisture to the region. Near where Fletcher made landfall for a final time on 9 February, Burketown experienced gale-force winds on both 9 and 10 February as the remnants of Fletcher tracked westward. Rainfall in the town amounted to 263.1 mm (10.36 in) over a nine-day period.

Flooding in Kowanyama began on 3 February as roads "turned into rivers" and the land around the town turned into a swamp. The mayor of Kowanyama described the town as "its own little island." However, residents were prepared for the storm and had supplies stocked up. Owing to the weak nature of the storm, no wind damage occurred throughout Queensland.

== See also ==
- 2013–14 Australian region cyclone season
- Cyclone Charlotte (2009)
