= Tortilla Flat (disambiguation) =

Tortilla Flat is a 1935 John Steinbeck novel.

Tortilla Flat may also refer to:

- Tortilla Flat (film), a 1942 American film
- Tortilla Flat, Arizona, United States, a town in the Superstition Mountains, along the Apache Trail
- Tortilla Flats, Northern Territory, Australia

== See also ==
- Tortilla Flaps, a 1958 Looney Tunes cartoon
