= Batchelor Demonstration Farm =

Australian farm (1911–1919)

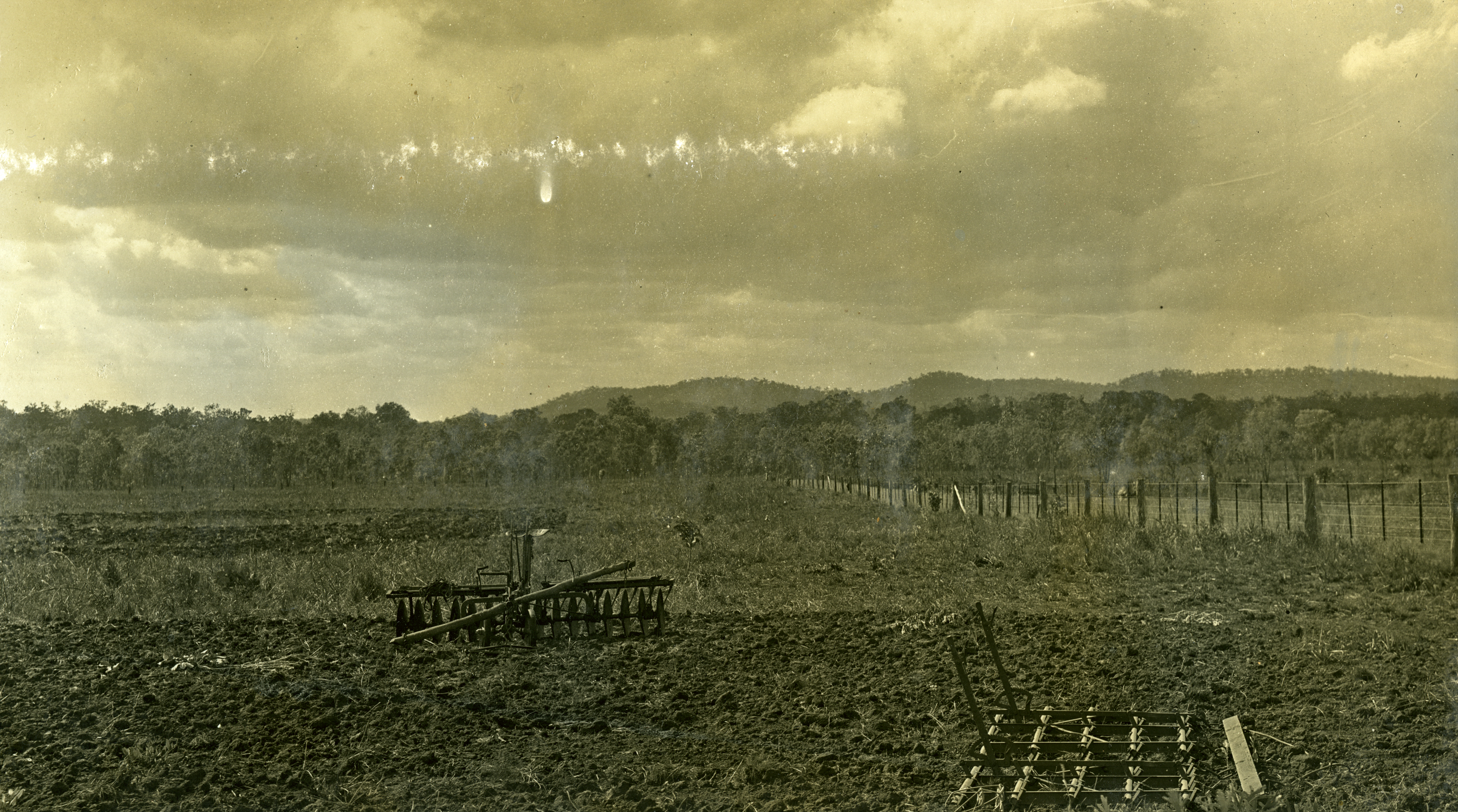
Batchelor Farm in 1912

The construction of the Batchelor Railway siding for use by Batchelor Demonstration Farm, 1912

The Batchelor Demonstration Farm, at Batchelor, Northern Territory, was established in 1911 and its creation led to the establishment of the town. It closed in 1919 but was resumed by the Commonwealth Government for defence purposes in 1941 when the Batchelor Airfield officially became a RAAF base. The traditional owners of the land are the Warrai and Kungarakany people and the farm site is home to artefacts and registered sacred sties.

The land for the farm was first surveyed for European use as a part of the Hundred of Goyder and was first purchased by WO Clyde and likely used to grow tobacco until it was selected by the government.

The total size of the farm was 2,500 to 3,000 hectares.

== History ==
When the Commonwealth Government took control of the North Territory in 1911, they poured resources into the region and, as part of this, they were determined to make a full investigation of the economic potential of the land. To do this they appointed expert Walter Scott Campbell, the recently retired director of Agriculture for New South Wales, to complete a survey. He arrived in Darwin on 15 May 1911 and spent five months touring the region. It was claimed that his optimistic presence "revived the flagging hopes of the half-dozen people who are engaged in agriculture".

One the completion of his survey he recommended that two demonstration farms be established – one on the Daly River and one at Rum Jungle (Batchelor) with the hope that they would improve resources and attract labour to the region. The farm was initially known as the Rum Jungle Demonstration Farm. It was renamed in honour of the recently deceased Lee Batchelor in April 1912 during a visit from the Federal Parliamentary party to the Northern Territory.

The Commonwealth Government, acting on Campbell's recommendations, established both farms and, in the first year £24,000 was spent on buildings, machinery and beginning to clear, cultivate and fence the land. Additionally, a railway siding was constructed at Batchelor to transport the farm's produce to Darwin on the North Australia Railway.

On the farm various aspects of mixed farming enterprises were tried including breeding stock (including various species of fowl), various forms of agriculture (including rice, cotton and an orchard), and the extraction of eucalyptus oil from the mallee scrub on the property. However, the farm struggled and this was in large part because of the harsh conditions for both staff and stock; many of their struggles coincided with industrial unrest in Darwin. By the middle of 1913 the manager of the farm, who had started in February 1912, had resigned and his replacement Charles Woolley was charged for the indecent assault of the wife and daughter of one of the Russian workers in 1913. Woolley was found not guilty of the charge but all Russian emigrants left the farm and one was charged with defamatory libel of Woolley. Additionally, the editor of the Northern Territory Times and Gazette was charge of contempt of court for criticising the behaviour of the judge during the trial; he was found guilty and his fine was paid by community members who agreed with him.

In 1915 the farm produced a very large pumpkin which Northern Territory Administrator John Anderson Gilruth was photographed beside. It was later stolen and it became known as the £4,000 - £40,000 pumpkin in reference to the amount of money spent to produce it and as a way of discrediting Gilruth. The pumpkin was also officially photographed and made into a post-card and sent all over the world.

In 1917 the failure of the farm was discussed, at length, in Senate and John Newlands said of it:

Why is it called an "experimental farm?" The thing is a fraud, and was proved so years ago. Nothing but obstinacy keeps it going. Endeavours have been made to pass it on to some one else, but no one will have it. Horses put on the place fat before the wet are now bags of bones, and have to be herded with the cattle outside the farm.

— John Newlands, Senator for the South Australia United Party, 18 July 1917

The farm was closed in 1919.
