= Jacksonia effusa =

Scientific classification
- Kingdom: Plantae
- Clade: Tracheophytes
- Clade: Angiosperms
- Clade: Eudicots
- Clade: Rosids
- Order: Fabales
- Family: Fabaceae
- Subfamily: Faboideae
- Genus: Jacksonia
- Species: J. effusa

Binomial name
- Jacksonia effusa Chappill

Species of legume

Jacksonia effusa is a species of flowering plant in the family Fabaceae and is endemic to a restricted area near Nitmiluk (Katherine) Gorge. It is a sprawling shrub, its end branches sharply-pointed phylloclades, its leaves reduced to sharply-pointed, narrowly egg-shaped scales, its flowers pale yellow, and its fruit, woody, hairy pods.

== Description ==
Jacksonia effusa is a sprawling shrub, that typically grows up to 20–40 cm (7.9–15.7 in) high and 0.5–1 m (1 ft 8 in – 3 ft 3 in) wide, its branches greyish-green or light green. Its end branches are sharply-pointed phylloclades, with its leaves reduced to sharply-pointed, narrowly egg-shaped, reddish-brown scales, 1.1–2.3 mm (0.043–0.091 in) long and 0.4–0.6 mm (0.016–0.024 in) wide. The flowers are sparsely arranged along the branches, each flower on a pedicel 1.3–1.7 mm (0.051–0.067 in) long. There are narrowly lance-shaped bracteoles 1.0–1.6 mm (0.039–0.063 in) long and 0.4–0.5 mm (0.016–0.020 in) wide at the base of the floral tube. The floral tube is about 0.8 mm (0.031 in) long and the sepals are membranous, the lower lobes 1.8–2.0 mm (0.071–0.079 in) long and 0.7–1 mm (0.028–0.039 in) wide, the upper lobes longer and narrower. The flowers are pale yellow, the standard petal is 2.7–4.3 mm (0.11–0.17 in) long and 3.3–3.5 mm (0.13–0.14 in) deep, the wings 2.3–3.3 mm (0.091–0.130 in) long, and the keel 1.8 mm (0.071 in) long. The stamens have pink filaments 0.9–1.8 mm (0.035–0.071 in) long. Flowering occurs in March, and the fruit is a woody, hairy, oval pod, 4.0–4.3 mm (0.16–0.17 in) long and 1.8–2.1 mm (0.071–0.083 in) wide.

== Taxonomy ==
Jacksonia effusa was first formally described in 2007 by Jennifer Anne Chappill in Australian Systematic Botany from specimens collected 30 km (19 mi) south-east of the Kakadu Highway in 1990. The specific epithet (effusa) means 'spread out', or 'straggling'.

== Distribution and habitat ==
This species of Jacksonia is only known from near Katherine Gorge, Bloomfield Springs and Eva Valley, where it grows in sand in woodland in Kakadu and Nitmiluk National Parks.

== Conservation status ==
Jacksonia effusa is listed as of "least concern" under the Northern Territory Government Territory Parks and Wildlife Conservation Act.
