= No. 87 Squadron RAAF =

Royal Australian Air Force squadron

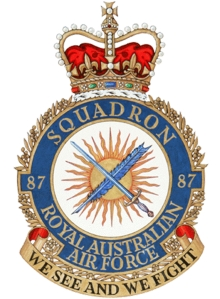
- Active: 1944–1946; 1948–1953; 2006–current
- Country: Australia
- Branch: Royal Australian Air Force
- Role: Air intelligence
- Part of: RAAF Air Warfare Centre
- Garrison/HQ: RAAF Base Edinburgh
- Battle honours: Darwin 1942–1944; Pacific 1942–1945; Dutch New Guinea 1945; Borneo 1945; Morotai 1945

No. 87 Squadron is a Royal Australian Air Force (RAAF) air intelligence squadron. It saw action during World War II as a photo reconnaissance squadron, being raised in September 1944 through the re-designation of No. 1 Photo Reconnaissance Unit, which had been formed in June 1942. Throughout the war, No. 87 Squadron flew a variety of aircraft from bases in Australia, gathering photographic intelligence on Japanese forces and installations throughout the Pacific. At the conclusion of hostilities, the squadron was disbanded but was later re-formed in 1948, carrying out aerial survey operations in Australia until 1953. In 2006, it was re-raised again as a non-flying squadron tasked with air intelligence analysis as part of the Information Warfare Directorate within the RAAF's Air Warfare Centre.

== History ==
=== World War II ===
The squadron was first formed at RAAF Station Laverton on 8 June 1942 as "No. 1 Photo Reconnaissance Unit" (1 PRU), with eight officers and thirty-five airmen under the command of Squadron Leader L. W. Law, operating six Brewster F2A Buffalos. Initial training in navigation and aerial photography was carried out at Laverton until 12 August 1942 when the unit began moving to Hughes Airfield, Northern Territory to prepare for operational service. A Japanese bombing raid on 23 August subsequently resulted in the loss of one Buffalo and a CAC Wirraway. Meanwhile, further training continued through to September which resulted in one aircraft and its pilot (Fl Lt Raymond Henry Winter AFC) being lost at Tallarook Vic. Two P-38 Lightnings were received in October. The first operational flights occurred between 10 and 19 November over Tanimbar Island; however, on 20 November a Lightning was destroyed in a crash, killing the pilot. Two P-43 Lancers arrived in November as the unit continued to expand, moving to Coomalie Creek Airfield in December.

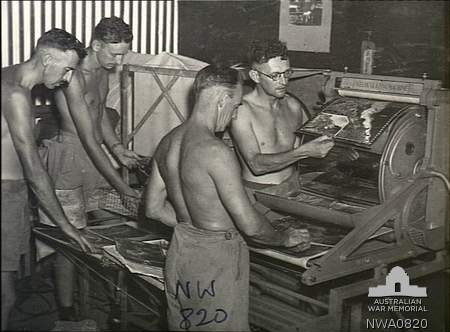
Ground staff from No. 87 Squadron printing aerial reconnaissance photos, 1945

Four operational flights were completed in January 1943, while reconnaissance of all Japanese aerodromes in Timor was completed in April. In May photo reconnaissance missions were completed over Timor, Tanimbar and Dutch New Guinea. In August aircraft from the squadron located two new Japanese airstrips near Koepang, and confirmed the presence over another one on Roti Island. Meanwhile, Japanese bombers attacked Coomalie on 13 and 20 August 1943; however, neither raid resulted in significant damage. During November the squadron conducted sorties over Timor, Kai, Tanimbar and Roti Island, yet bad weather curtailed operations during December. No operations were completed in January 1944 due to aircraft unserviceability. Operations continued between February and May, with the squadron receiving its first de Havilland Mosquito aircraft on 26 May 1944. Between June and August the squadron flew missions over Java, Balikpapan, Biak, the Halmaheras and the Philippines. A Mosquito was detached to Noemfoor in August.

On 10 September 1944, No. 1 PRU was re-designated as "No. 87 Squadron" at Coomalie Creek Airfield in the Northern Territory. The new squadron was initially equipped with two Wirraways and a Mosquito and was tasked with providing photo reconnaissance support for Allied operations in South East Asia and the Netherlands East Indies. Operating from Coomalie Creek the squadron primarily conducted reconnaissance flights over the eastern islands of the Netherlands East Indies, with occasional missions over Java and other parts of South East Asia. As more Mosquitoes were received the number of missions flown increased. A detachment from the squadron was briefly based on the Cocos Islands in June 1945 where it unsuccessfully attempted to photograph targets in Singapore, being hampered by bad weather and the loss of an aircraft.

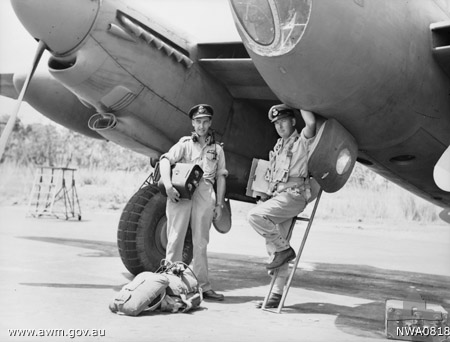
The pilot and navigator of a No. 87 Squadron Mosquito returning from a mission in 1945

At the end of the war, No. 87 Squadron continued to conduct flights over Japanese held territory in order to monitor Japanese Army units until they could be disarmed. The squadron moved to Parkes, New South Wales, in October 1945 where it was disbanded on 24 July 1946. For their service during the war, one member of No. 87 Squadron was made a Member of the Order of the British Empire, four received the Distinguished Flying Cross and seven were Mentioned in Dispatches.

Following No. 87 Squadron's disbandment its Mosquito aircraft were operated as the "Survey Flight" based at RAAF Base Fairbairn. This flight was expanded to full squadron status in November 1946, and then re-designated as No. 87 Squadron on 8 March 1948. Operating in the photo survey role the squadron carried out many operations to support the Commonwealth Survey Committee and National Mapping Council. The squadron also became responsible with providing the RAAF with a photo reconnaissance capability in 1949. Following the withdrawal of funding support by the Department of National Development No. 87 Squadron was disbanded at Fairbairn in December 1953.

=== Reactivation ===
No. 87 Squadron was reactivated as the Air Force's air intelligence squadron on 1 July 2006. It is part of the Information Warfare Directorate within the RAAF's Air Warfare Centre. The squadron's headquarters is located at RAAF Base Edinburgh and its seven Tactical Intelligence Flights (TIFs) are situated with all flying Force Element Groups of the Air Force as well as with Combat Support Group.

The squadron is responsible for providing air intelligence and counter-intelligence analysis and combat targeting support to on-going Air Force operations. Personnel in the squadron comprise Air Intelligence Officer, Armament Engineer, Air Combat Officer, Air Intelligence Analyst (GEOINT, SIGINT and OPINT), Air Surveillance Operator, and administrative, computer systems support and logistics trade groups. As of 2007, the squadron had a total strength of 140 permanent and 30 reserve personnel stationed at five different bases.

In March 2011, No. 87 Squadron was awarded the Markowski Cup for being the most proficient non-flying squadron in the Air Force for 2010. Previously in September 1948, No. 87 Squadron had also won the Duke of Gloucester Cup for the most proficient flying squadron of the RAAF, in recognition of its photographic survey work.

== Battle honours ==
In 2009, the Governor General of Australia awarded No. 87 Squadron with five battle honours related to its service during World War II. The delay in awarding these honours was due to the squadron having been disbanded in 1953, which was prior to the general awarding of World War II battle honours to RAAF units which occurred during the mid-1950s. With the reactivation of No. 87 Squadron in 2006, the latent honours were able to be awarded. No. 87 Squadron's battle honours are:

- Darwin 1942–1944
- Pacific 1942–1945
- Dutch New Guinea 1945
- Borneo 1945
- Morotai 1945

== Commanding officers ==
Commanding officers of No. 87 Squadron

Commanding officer	Date of appointment
Squadron Leader L. W. Law	8 June 1942 (1PRU)
Squadron Leader C. C. Lawrie	14 June 1942 (1PRU)
Squadron Leader A. S. Hermes	July 1943 (1PRU)
Squadron Leader A. S. Hermes	10 September 1944
Squadron Leader H. A. Gamble	20 December 1944
Squadron Leader L. W. Law	28 July 1945
Squadron Leader L. P. Bond	8 Mar 1948
Flight Lieutenant R. A. Hosking	30 April 1948
Flight Lieutenant V. D. Guthrie	23 November 1950
Squadron Leader C. H. Browne	13 April 1951
Squadron Leader A. E. McKenzie	1 July 1953
Flight Lieutenant L. O. Hindley	21 September 1953
Flying Officer T. A. Slattery	16 October 1953
Squadron disbanded in December 1953 and reformed in July 2006
Wing Commander Rick Keir, AM	1 July 2006
Wing Commander Richard Trotman-Dickenson, AM	12 January 2009
Wing Commander Greg Weller	16 January 2012
Wing Commander Jon Keily	29 January 2014
Wing Commander Col Coghill	8 July 2016
Wing Commander Hannah Jude-Smith	15 January 2018

== Badge ==
With the reactivation of No. 87 Squadron in 2006, the original squadron badge which had been approved by King George VI in July 1949, was updated and the revised badge with a motto in English was approved by the Chief of Air Force, Air Marshal Geoff Shepherd, on 22 March 2006. The badge consists of the following elements:

- The Sun: represents the squadron's role in maintaining knowledge and understanding of its adversaries.
- The Quill: represents the squadron's analytical and communications capabilities, as the ability to impart knowledge is as important as the ability to acquire it.
- The Sword: represents the squadron's role in the conduct of warfare.
- Squadron Motto: "We See and We Fight" (originally "Videmus Militamus" on the previous badge) – highlights the importance of intelligence in detecting, locating and identifying the enemy in the successful conduct of air operations and the squadron's role in both the offensive and defensive aspects of air warfare.

== Aircraft operated ==
No. 87 Squadron and its predecessor unit, 1 PRU, operated the following aircraft:

- CAC Wirraway (September 1944 – July 1946)
- Brewster F2A Buffalo
- De Havilland DH98 Mosquito PR Mark XVI (September 1944 – July 1946, March 1948 – December 1953)
- P-38 Lightning (August 1942 – August 1944)
- Republic P-43 Lancer
