= Tortilla Flats =

- Suburb
- Coordinates: 13°05′50.3″S 131°10′40.1″E
- Country: Australia
- State: Northern Territory
- LGA: Coomalie Shire

Government
  - Territory electorate: Daly
  - Federal division: Lingiari

Population
  - Total: 14 (2016 census)
- Postcode: 0845
Suburbs around Tortilla Flats
Coomalie Creek	Coomalie Creek	Margaret River
Batchelor	Tortilla Flats	Margaret River
Batchelor	Adelaide River	Margaret River

Tortilla Flats is a rural locality in the Coomalie Shire, Northern Territory, Australia. It is located approximately 105 kilometres (65 mi) south east of the Territory capital Darwin. The locality is named after a farm established in 1958 by the Australian Government to conduct agricultural experiments. It was also the site of an artillery and weapons range used by Australian and US forces during the Second World War. The land surrounding the locality is sparsely populated and mainly set aside for pastoral uses.

== History ==
During World War 2 an artillery and aerial weapons range was established to the south of the Coomalie Creek Airfield in the area now known as Tortilla Flats.

The Tortilla Flats Research Farm, originally known as the Upper Adelaide River Experiment Station operated from 1958-90 when the land was sold off to private owners. Experiments conducted here focussed on rice as a potential export crop, as well as cattle rotation techniques. Estimates based on this research in 1981 found that a land area of 45,000 hectares (110,000 acres) in the Adelaide River region was suited to irrigated rice production, and a potential crop yield in excess of 12,000 tonnes (12,000 long tons; 13,000 short tons) could be harvested annually from such activities.

== Present day ==
Trials involving the growing of rice crops are once again being conducted in the on private farms in the vicinity. These trials are supported by the NT Department of Resources and are investigating the potential of higher crop yields gained by growing the different varieties of rice during the dry season.

== See also ==
- Humpty Doo
