= Margaret River, Northern Territory =

Margaret River Northern Territory
- Coordinates: 13°14′03″S 131°21′34″E
- Population: 10 (2016 census)
- Established: 4 April 2007
- Postcode(s): 0822
- Time zone: ACST (UTC+9:30)
- Location: 93 km (58 mi) SE of Darwin City
- LGA(s): unincorporated area
- Territory electorate(s): Goyder
- Federal division(s): Lingiari
Mean max temp	Mean min temp	Annual rainfall
33.7 °C; 93 °F	21.2 °C; 70 °F	1,564.4 mm 61.6 in
Suburbs around Margaret River:
Coomalie Creek	Marrakai; Mount Bundey	Mount Bundey
Coomalie Creek; Tortilla Flats; Adelaide River; Robin Falls	Margaret River	Mount Bundey; Burrundie
Robin Falls	Robin Falls; Douglas-Daly; Burrundie	Burrundie
- Footnotes: Locations; Adjoining localities

Margaret River is a locality in the Northern Territory of Australia located about 93 kilometres (58 mi) south-east of the territory capital of Darwin.

The locality consists of land bounded in part to the west by the Adelaide River and to the south by the Stuart Highway. This locality is named after the Margaret River, a tributary of the Adelaide River, which runs through the locality. Its boundaries and name were gazetted on 4 April 2007.

The 2016 Australian census which was conducted in August 2016 reports that Margaret River had ten people living within its boundaries.

Margaret River is located within the federal division of Lingiari, the territory electoral division of Goyder and within the unincorporated areas of the Northern Territory.
