= Adelaide River War Cemetery =

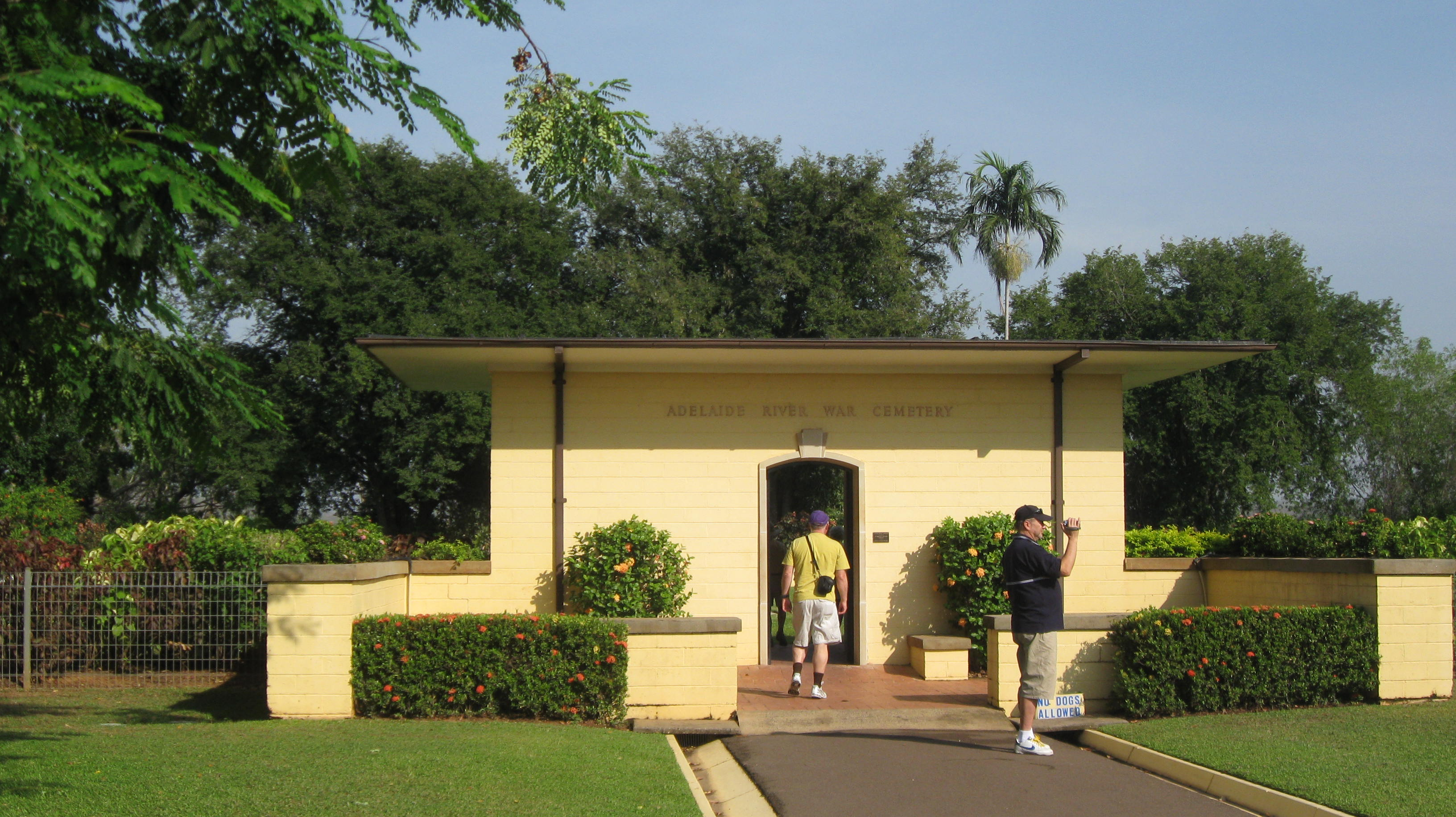

- Location within Northern Territory
- 13.2307°S 131.1142°E
- Location: 105 Memorial Terrace, Adelaide River, Northern Territory, Australia

Commonwealth Heritage List
- Official name: Adelaide River War Cemetery
- Type: Listed place (Historic)
- Designated: 22 June 2004
- Reference no.: 105422

Adelaide River War Cemetery is a heritage-listed cemetery at 105 Memorial Terrace, Adelaide River, Northern Territory, Australia. It was added to the Australian Commonwealth Heritage List on 22 June 2004.

== History ==
During World War II Darwin became a naval base. It suffered its first air attack on 19 February 1942, and within a month of the first air raid Darwin became the heart of the operational base. The Northern Territory contained the largest operational base in the South West Pacific. Adelaide River and Alice Springs were the headquarters of large base establishments and the main north south road from Darwin to the railhead at Alice Springs was built during the war. Nos. 107 and 129 Australian General Hospitals were based at Darwin; Nos. 101 and 121 at Katherine; No. 119 at Adelaide River and No. 65 Camp Hospital at Pine Creek.

The Adelaide River War Cemetery was created for the burial of servicemen and women who died in this area of Northern Australia particularly those who died at the Australian General Hospitals 101, 107, 119, 121 and 129. The site was selected by Army chaplain Arch Grant who performed many of the early burials there.

The cemetery was opened in February 1942 in the immediate aftermath of the first Japanese air raids on Darwin. The site was close to Australian General Hospital No. 119 and to forward military headquarters.

After the war the Army Graves Service moved graves from civil cemeteries, isolated sites and temporary military burial grounds, into the Adelaide River War Cemetery. Graves were moved from the Bagot Hospital Cemetery, Berrimah Hospital and War Cemetery, Daly Waters Civil Cemetery, Darwin Public Cemetery, Gove War Cemetery, Hughes Cemetery Darwin, Katherine Civil and War Cemeteries, Larrimah War Cemetery, Milingimbi War Cemetery, Mount Isa War Cemetery in Queensland, South Goulburn Island Mission Cemetery and Truscott War Cemetery.

In September 1947, the Adelaide River War Cemetery was taken over by the Commonwealth War Graves Commission and is now maintained by staff of the Office of Australian War Graves.

The Northern Territory Memorial to the Missing was erected in the cemetery, as a memorial to those who have no known grave. This Memorial was erected to commemorate those of the Australian Army, the Royal Australian Air Force and the Australian Merchant Navy who lost their lives in the South West Pacific region during World War Two. (Men of the Royal Australian Navy who lost their lives in this area and who have no known grave are commemorated on the Plymouth Naval Memorial in England, along with those of the Royal Navy and of other Commonwealth naval forces.)

The Adelaide River Civil Cemetery adjoins the War Cemetery. In the Civil Cemetery are 63 civilians who died as a result of war service, including nine Post Office workers killed on 19 February 1942, as a result of a direct hit on the original Darwin Post Office by Japanese bombs.

The cemetery entry building was constructed c. 1948. In 1984 the original erect synthetic marble headstones in the military section of the cemetery were removed and substituted with low concrete plinths, with metal plaques affixed. This was considered necessary as a result of deterioration to the plaques due to the tropical environment and is a standard practice of the CWGC in tropical areas.

== Description ==
The Adelaide River War Cemetery is located 1 km off the Stuart Highway in the town of Adelaide River.

The Cemetery is entered through an entrance building purpose built as a porte-cochere, constructed of concrete blocks painted pale yellow, sandstone columns and seat, granite altar. The floor is brick (c.1985) and the wall capping is cast concrete. The entry door is painted cast iron with a copper clad roof over cast concrete. The building provides visitors with information about the bombing during WWII of Darwin and surrounds. The information is engraved on metal plaques fixed to the insides of the walls.

The Cemetery is divided into two main sections. The eastern section is a military cemetery, containing 434 burials of service personnel who died in and near north Australia during World War Two, and memorials to persons who died in the north Australian theatre but whose bodies were not recovered. The burials comprise 14 airmen of the Royal Air Force, 12 unidentified men of the British Merchant Navy, one soldier of the Canadian Army, 18 sailors, 181 soldiers and 201 airmen belonging to the Australian forces, and seven men of the Australian Merchant Navy.

The graves are laid out in formal straight lines with bronze plaques on low concrete plinths. A small plant shrub is located between each plaque.

Located centrally in the cemetery between the entrance building and the Cross of Sacrifice (at the rear of the cemetery) is the Northern Territory Memorial to the Missing, constructed of sandstone. The total number honoured on the Memorial is 293, of whom 103 belong to the Australian Army, 164 to the Royal Australian Air Force and 26 to the Australian Merchant Navy. Included in the Army names is a sister of the Australian Army Nursing Service.

A Cross of Sacrifice is located at the rear of the cemetery in a direct line behind the entranceway and the Memorial to the Missing. It is constructed of stone against which a bronze sword stands out. Its symbolism is open to various interpretations - to some the sword itself is the "Cross" and the stonework merely the frame; to others the sword symbolises the offering up in sacrifice for those who perished by the sword.

The western section of the cemetery contains the burial places of 64 civilians who died while involved with war service, including a common grave with low set memorial to Darwin Post Office personnel who were killed during the first Japanese air raid on 19 February 1942. The other civilian graves are laid out in formal straight lines with bronze plaques on low concrete plinths, no planting is located in the lawn area.

The whole cemetery is surrounded by mature tropical plantings.

The Adelaide River War Cemetery is one of the largest in Australia with 436 graves, including 435 of WWII and 1 of the Vietnam War. The Sydney War Cemetery is the largest war cemetery in Australia (734 graves); Springvale, Victoria has 611, Cowra (Japanese) War Cemetery in Victoria has 523, and Perth has 493 graves.

The Adelaide River War Cemetery provides evocative evidence of the scale, intensity and duration of the war in and near northern Australia.

== Heritage listing ==
Adelaide River War Cemetery was listed on the Australian Commonwealth Heritage List on 22 June 2004 with the following rationale:

The Adelaide River War Cemetery established in 1942, serves as the last resting place for service men and women who lost their lives in northern Australia as a result of World War II . It is one of the larger Australian War Cemeteries, and portrays the scale, intensity and human sacrifice of Australian and Commonwealth personnel in the north of Australia during WWII. The adjoining Civil Cemetery, includes the graves of sixty three civilians who lost their lives as a result of war service including nine Post Office workers who lost their lives as a result of the initial Japanese bombing of Darwin.

The Cemetery provides evidence of the impact of WWII on northern Australia and is associated with the first bombing of Darwin on 19 February 1942.

The Adelaide River War Cemetery is highly valued by the community as a memorial to those who lost their lives in northern Australia during WW II and for its symbolism of wartime sacrifice and common purpose.

The Adelaide River War Cemetery is typical of the design used by the Commonwealth War Graves Commission for war cemeteries around the world. In the Adelaide River War Cemetery the standard design is reflected in the lay out of the graves in formal straight rows with bronze plaques on low concrete plinths, used in tropical areas, and the Cross of Sacrifice within a landscaped garden.

== Notable Interments ==
- Group Captain Wilfred Arthur DSO DFC (1919-2000), RAAF fighter ace of World War II.
