= Winchester mine =

Magnesium mine in Australia

- Location within Northern Territory
- Location: Northern Territory, Australia; 13°02′52″S 131°03′39″E
- Products: Magnesium

The Winchester mine is a mining prospect and one of the largest magnesite deposits in Australia and the world. It is located in the Northern Territory, about three kilometres east of Batchelor. The deposit has estimated reserves of 16.6 million tonnes of ore with 43.5% magnesite.
