= Robin Falls, Northern Territory =

Robin Falls
- Suburb
- Coordinates: 13°22′02″S 131°07′43″E
- Country: Australia
- State: Northern Territory
- LGA: unincorporated area
- Location: 103 km (64 mi) S of Darwin City
- Established: 4 April 2007

Government
  - Territory electorate: Daly
  - Federal division: Lingiari

Population
  - Total: 13 (2016 census)
- Time zone: UTC+9:30 (ACST)
- Postcode: 0822
- Mean max temp: 33.7 °C (92.7 °F)
- Mean min temp: 21.2 °C (70.2 °F)
- Annual rainfall: 1,564.4 mm (61.59 in)
Suburbs around Robin Falls
Litchfield Park	Litchfield Park; Adelaide River; Margaret River	Margaret River
Litchfield Park; Tipperary	Robin Falls	Margaret River; Douglas-Daly
Tipperary	Tipperary; Douglas-Daly	Douglas-Daly
- Locations; Adjoining localities

Robin Falls is a locality in the Northern Territory of Australia located on the Cox Peninsula and adjoining land about 103 kilometres (64 mi) south of the territory capital of Darwin.

The locality was named after Robin Falls, a waterfall located within its boundaries and which is reported as being named by Clyde Fenton, a North Territory medical practitioner and pilot, after Robin Cook, the “daughter of Dr M Cook, Chief Medical Officer and Chief Protector of Aboriginals from 1927 to 1939”. Its boundaries and name were gazetted on 4 April 2007.

Robin Falls includes the site of a former World War II era chemical warfare facility which was listed on the Northern Territory Heritage Register on 2 March 2011 under the name of the WWII 88 Mile Burrell Creek Chemical Warfare Depot and Camp.

The 2016 Australian census reports that Robin Falls had 13 people living within its boundaries.

Robin Falls is located within the federal division of Lingiari, the territory electoral division of Daly and within the unincorporated areas of the Northern Territory.
