= Stapleton, Northern Territory =

Stapleton
- Suburb
- Coordinates: 13°10′49″S 131°02′35.5″E
- Country: Australia
- State: Northern Territory
- LGA: Coomalie Shire
- Location: 114 km (71 mi) S of Darwin; 10 km (6.2 mi) NW of Adelaide River
- Established: 1873 (settlement); 29 October 1997 (locality)

Government
  - Territory electorate: Daly
  - Federal division: Lingiari

Population
  - Total: 68 (2016 census)
- Postcode: 0822
Suburbs around Stapleton
Camp Creek	Eva Valley; Batchelor	Adelaide River
Camp Creek	Stapleton	Adelaide River
Camp Creek	Litchfield Park	Adelaide River

The "Our House" Hotel in 1879

Stapleton is a rural locality in the Coomalie Shire of the Northern Territory, Australia. It is located approximately 10 km (6.2 mi) northwest of Adelaide River and is situated on Stapleton Creek.

== Nomenclature ==
Stapleton Creek was named by surveyor Gilbert Rotherdale McMinn in 1870 to honour James L. Stapleton, a field operator working on the Overland Telegraph who would later be killed in an incident that led to the 1874 Barrow Creek Massacre. The locality takes its name from the creek.

== History ==
The Awarai Aboriginal people are the traditional owners and original inhabitants of the Stapleton area. The first European exploration of the area occurred with the survey party of 1869 led by George Goyder. In 1873, Mr W Barlow, director of the Virginia Prospecting Company discovered a quartz reef and established a mining claim in the area. A hotel known as the "Our House Hotel" was opened by Edward D Matthews next to Stapleton Creek in 1874. The end of the same year, applications had been received for a growing number of mining leases in the area, lodged by both the Virginia company and a number of private prospectors.

A siding and station was constructed and opened with the North Australia Railway to Pine Creek in 1889 to support the mining industry and growing population. Prior to the line, the settlement had been served by the Haimes Royal Mail coach between Southport on its way to the goldfields near Pine Creek.

A cemetery was in use between 1874 and 1902 and is today commemorated by a plaque erected by the NT government with the names of those interred according to the records of the NT genealogical society.

In 1895 the Stapleton Siding massacre took place here where approximately 80 Kungarakany and Warray peoples were killed with poisoned damper which likely contained weed-killer; one of the survivors of that massacre was Alngindabu.

By the 1920s, mining activity had declined and agriculture was becoming the dominant industry in the area. To support the operation of Vestey's Meatworks in Darwin the railway station was expanded with additional sidings as well as stock yards and cattle loading facilities between 1914 and 1917, a sign of the changing local economy and stronger emphasis on pastoralism. Small scale cotton crops were grown with some success during this period.

During World War II, the railway sidings were further expanded and the station became an unloading point for meat and fresh food supplies for troops camped in the area.

In 1966, a site where Stapleton Creek crosses the Stuart Highway, 6 km (3.7 mi) east of the settlement (by this stage little more than a railway siding) was considered for the construction of a flood mitigation and irrigation dam. Despite a geological survey and investigation being conducted by the Commonwealth Government, the dam was not constructed.

== Present Day ==
Little trace remains of the former hotel and railway station today. The area is mostly a rural locality with a number of agricultural properties and a few dwellings close to the creek. A plaque marks the site of the one time cemetery. The unsealed roads through the area are used by locals as an alternative route between Batchelor and Adelaide River.
