= Batchelor, Northern Territory =

Batchelor
- Town
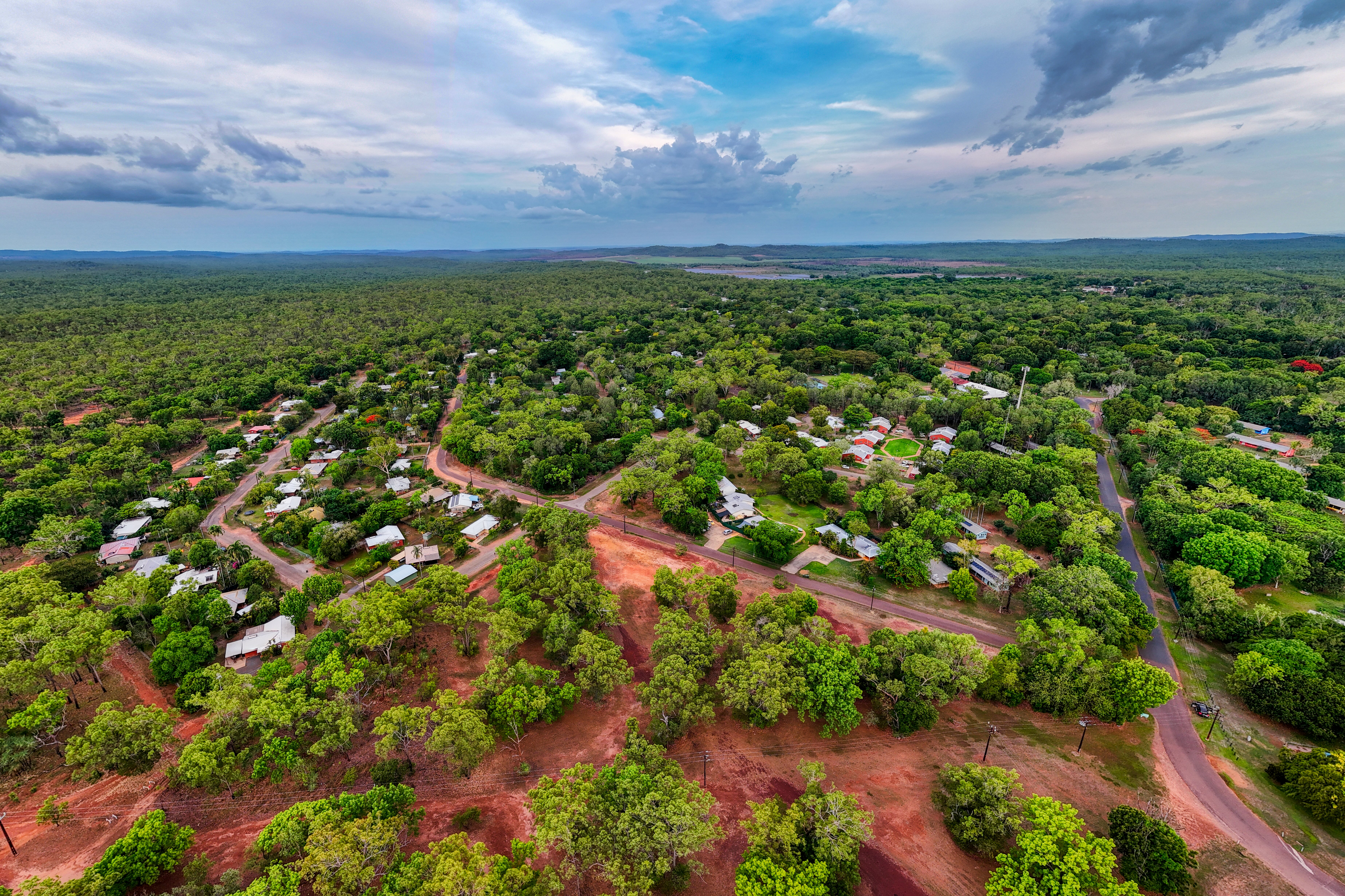

- Coordinates: 13°04′0″S 131°01′0″E
- Country: Australia
- State: Northern Territory
- LGA: Coomalie Shire
- Location: 98 km (61 mi) S of Darwin; 38 km (24 mi) NW of Adelaide River
- Established: 1911 (Settlement); 20 September 1977 (town); 29 October 1997 (locality)

Government
  - Territory electorate: Daly
  - Federal division: Lingiari
- Elevation: 104 m (341 ft)

Population
  - Total: 507 (2016 census)
- Postcode: 0845
- Mean max temp: 33.6 °C (92.5 °F)
- Mean min temp: 21.1 °C (70.0 °F)
- Annual rainfall: 1,544.9 mm (60.82 in)
Localities around Batchelor
| Rum Jungle | Rum Jungle | Coomalie Creek |
| Finniss Valley; Eva Valley | Batchelor | Coomalie Creek; Tortilla Flats; Adelaide River |
| Eva Valley | Stapleton | Adelaide River |

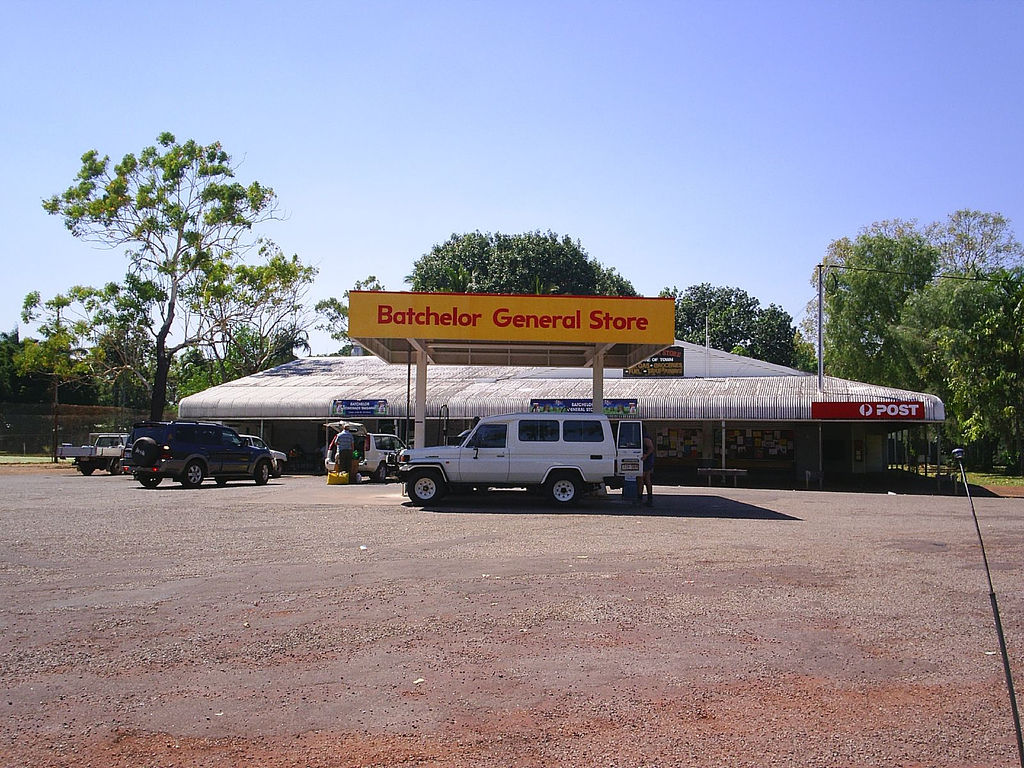
The General Store and Post Office at Batchelor, 2006

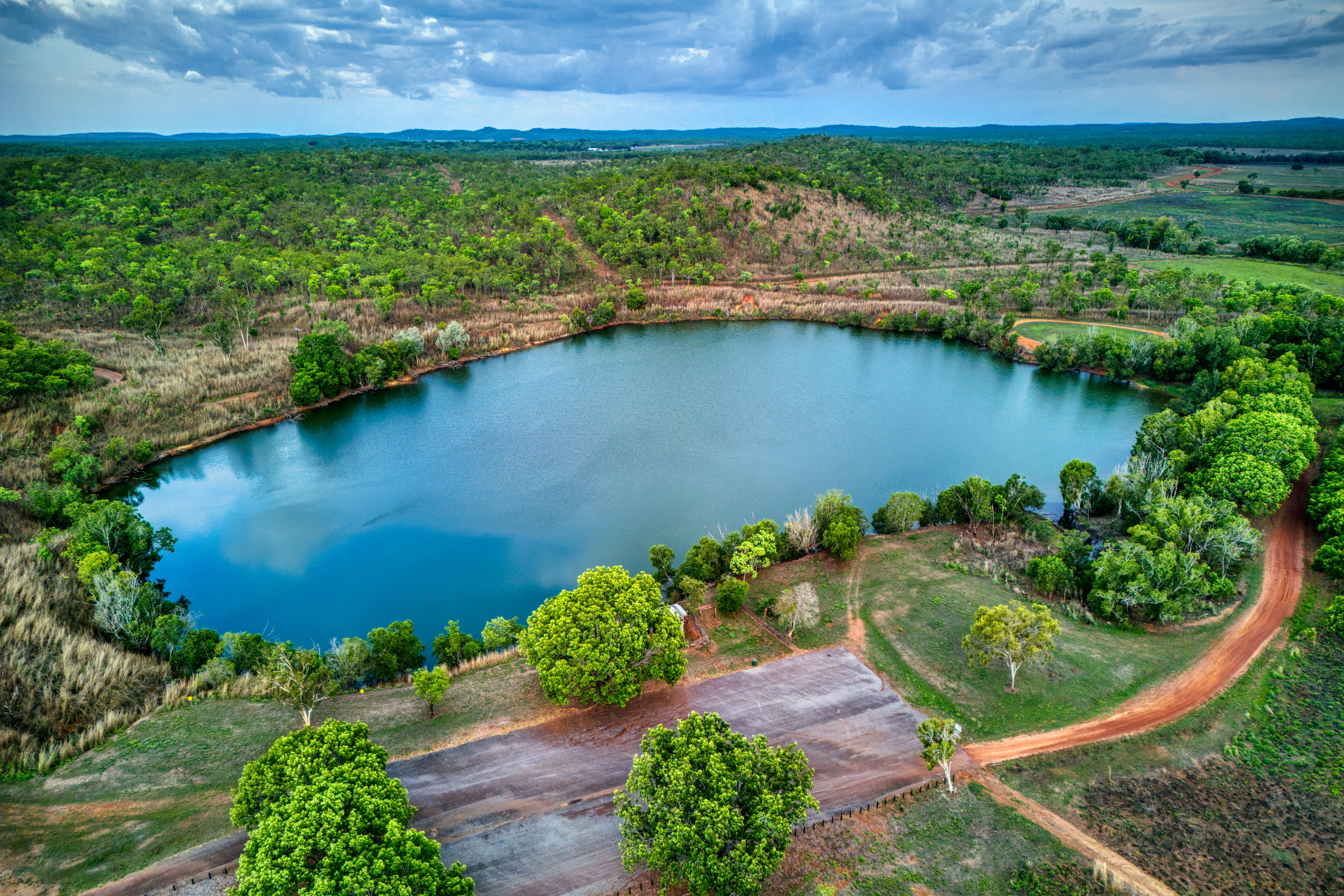
Rum Jungle Lake

Batchelor is a town in the Northern Territory, Australia. Located 98 kilometres (61 mi) south of the territory capital, Darwin, it is the current seat and largest town of the Coomalie Shire local government area.

The first inhabitants and traditional owners of the land surrounding the town are the Warrai and Kungarakany peoples.

In the 2016 census, Batchelor recorded a population of 507 people, with 36% of Aboriginal and Torres Strait Islander origin.

== History ==
The area of Batchelor, then known by its broader locality Rum Jungle, was first surveyed in 1869 as a part of Hundred of Goyder (Northern Territory) and was first purchased by WO Clyde and likely used to grow tobacco until it was selected by the government.

In 1911 the area was selected as one of two demonstration farms (the other was located at Daly River) established by the Commonwealth to investigate the economic potential of the Northern Territory following the administrative hand over from South Australia; this was known as Batchelor Demonstration Farm. The farm and an associated railway siding were named in 1912 after Lee Batchelor, the first minister responsible for the Northern Territory who died in office during the previous year. The farm operated until 1919, experimenting with different crops and livestock with varied results. The farm suffered from problems attracting and retaining experienced workers amid the strikes and industrial relations turmoil that led to the Darwin Rebellion. Among the crops successfully produced at the farm were melons, pumpkins and cabbages. From 1919, the farm was used both as a private cattle station and an Aboriginal compound.

A portion of the land formerly used for the demonstration farm was cleared during 1933 for use as a civilian aerodrome. This airfield would be substantially upgraded during World War II, becoming a major base for both Royal Australian Air Force and United States Army Air Forces in the defence of Australia. Units of the Royal Netherlands East Indies Army Air Force also operated from Batchelor. To support the airbase, the railway siding formerly used by the demonstration farm was extended and a petrol unloading point installed.

Following the discovery of uranium at Rum Jungle by prospector Jack White in 1948, Consolidated Zinc began mining and processing the uranium on behalf of the Australian Atomic Energy Commission. In co-operation with the Federal Government constructed much of the present day town from August 1952 onwards, creating housing and amenities for workers on the project. The original design had been based around a permanent population for some 600 persons, but during the years the mine was operating, this number was regularly exceeded.

Processing and extraction of uranium ore at the Rum Jungle mine had ceased by 1971, and the control of the township was handed back to the Northern Territory Administration. The administration would oversee the establishment of new industries beginning in 1974, with the training of Aboriginal teachers aides and classroom assistants for remote schools through the Aboriginal Teacher Education Centre annex of Kormilda College. In 1979, the Northern Territory Government sold many houses in Batchelor to existing residents and encouraged the development of private sector industries, including the Meneling Abattoirs and Woodcutters Mine to establish a permanent population base to ensure the ongoing viability of the town.

== Economy ==
The major employment industries in Batchelor are education, tourism and horticulture. The town is home to a TAFE and higher education college, the Batchelor Institute, with a strong focus on delivering higher educational outcomes for indigenous students from around Australia. The institute has been located at its current location since 1982. At the 2011 census, 18% of Batchelor's workforce were employed in the tertiary education industry and a further 9.5% were employed in school education.

The town is an entry point for travellers to Litchfield National Park which attracts approximately 280,000 visitors annually. Seven rangers of the Parks & Wildlife Commission and the Litchfield National Park office are based in the town. The town is situated on one of two all-weather access roads to the park and a number of accommodation options are available as well as services including mechanical repairs and a supermarket. There are a number of attractions in the town area for visitors travelling between Darwin and Litchfield Park including a museum, cultural centre, butterfly sanctuary and miniature replica of Karlstein Castle. The airfield also offers scenic flights and sky diving for visitors.

In 2011, it was announced that the Windy Hills Australian Game Meat company has signed an agreement to re-open and operate the Batchelor abattoirs to process cattle, buffalo and camel meats over an initial period of five years. The abattoirs previously contributed significantly to the local economy and jobs market, but have been closed in recent years due to unfavourable industry conditions.

Mining company Compass Resources applied in 2005 to commence mining operations on the Browns Oxide project site adjacent to the former Rum Jungle mine, 7 km (4.3 mi) north of Batchelor. While approval was granted for this project in 2006, the company was placed in voluntary administration in 2009. The future of the project is now in doubt.

== Climate ==
Batchelor experiences a tropical savanna climate (Köppen: Aw) with distinct wet and dry seasons. The annual rainfall is 1,487.8 millimetres (58.57 in), primarily falling during the wet season from November to April. High humidity and overnight temperatures as well as large thunderstorms characterise this season. Streams and rivers in the area are prone to seasonal flooding and road closures are common during the wet season. During the dry season from May to October, the overnight temperatures are cooler and the days typically warm with little rainfall or cloud cover.

Climate data for Batchelor Aero (13º03'S, 131º02'E, 104 m AMSL) (1992-2024 normals and extremes)
| Month | Jan | Feb | Mar | Apr | May | Jun | Jul | Aug | Sep | Oct | Nov | Dec | Year |
|---|---|---|---|---|---|---|---|---|---|---|---|---|---|
| Record high °C (°F) | 38.5 (101.3) | 37.3 (99.1) | 36.6 (97.9) | 38.1 (100.6) | 37.1 (98.8) | 35.8 (96.4) | 36.4 (97.5) | 37.3 (99.1) | 39.6 (103.3) | 41.9 (107.4) | 41.2 (106.2) | 39.8 (103.6) | 41.9 (107.4) |
| Mean daily maximum °C (°F) | 32.7 (90.9) | 32.5 (90.5) | 33.2 (91.8) | 33.8 (92.8) | 32.8 (91.0) | 31.7 (89.1) | 32.0 (89.6) | 33.5 (92.3) | 36.1 (97.0) | 36.8 (98.2) | 35.7 (96.3) | 34.0 (93.2) | 33.7 (92.7) |
| Mean daily minimum °C (°F) | 24.0 (75.2) | 23.9 (75.0) | 23.6 (74.5) | 21.9 (71.4) | 19.1 (66.4) | 17.2 (63.0) | 16.4 (61.5) | 17.1 (62.8) | 20.7 (69.3) | 23.1 (73.6) | 24.0 (75.2) | 24.2 (75.6) | 21.3 (70.3) |
| Record low °C (°F) | 19.8 (67.6) | 20.7 (69.3) | 15.5 (59.9) | 12.6 (54.7) | 9.6 (49.3) | 6.9 (44.4) | 9.1 (48.4) | 8.4 (47.1) | 10.4 (50.7) | 16.6 (61.9) | 19.1 (66.4) | 19.1 (66.4) | 6.9 (44.4) |
| Average precipitation mm (inches) | 337.1 (13.27) | 326.2 (12.84) | 225.7 (8.89) | 87.7 (3.45) | 23.6 (0.93) | 0.6 (0.02) | 0.9 (0.04) | 2.0 (0.08) | 9.9 (0.39) | 62.0 (2.44) | 135.3 (5.33) | 267.3 (10.52) | 1,487.8 (58.57) |
| Average precipitation days (≥ 1.0 mm) | 17.0 | 16.4 | 14.0 | 5.4 | 1.3 | 0.1 | 0.1 | 0.2 | 1.0 | 5.7 | 9.6 | 14.6 | 85.4 |
| Average afternoon relative humidity (%) | 70 | 70 | 61 | 45 | 35 | 30 | 26 | 25 | 28 | 35 | 48 | 63 | 45 |
| Average dew point °C (°F) | 24.1 (75.4) | 24.0 (75.2) | 22.4 (72.3) | 18.5 (65.3) | 13.8 (56.8) | 10.2 (50.4) | 8.9 (48.0) | 8.8 (47.8) | 12.5 (54.5) | 16.6 (61.9) | 20.6 (69.1) | 23.2 (73.8) | 17.0 (62.5) |
Source: Bureau of Meteorology (1992-2024 normals and extremes)

== Infrastructure ==
=== Health ===
Batchelor has a small medical clinic operated by the Northern Territory Government, offering a general practice service on weekdays. The clinic is staffed 24 hours for emergency care. The clinic offers specialist services by appointment by way of semi-regular visits as with many remote clinics in the Northern Territory. Batchelor Health Centre is typically staffed by a primary health care manager, two GPs, two to three remote area nurses and an Aboriginal health worker. Emergency medications are kept on site, but the nearest pharmacy is located in the outer suburbs of Darwin, some distance to the north. Batchelor Airfield has lighting available for night landings facilitating emergency evacuations, and an ambulance is also based in the town.

=== Education ===
There is one public school in Batchelor, the Batchelor Area School established in 1953. The school caters for students from Transition to Year 9, with students in Years 10-12 travelling to Darwin to complete their schooling. As with many schools in the Northern Territory, a pre-school is also located on the site. The school's student catchment covers the entire Coomalie Shire as well as parts of Litchfield Shire. As there is no public bus service in the town, special school bus services are provided to and from the Eva Valley, Acacia Hills and Adelaide River areas. In 2010, Batchelor Area School was granted funding from the Australian Government to extend the library facilities as part of the Building the Education Revolution program. As of 2016, there were 119 students enrolled at the school.

The main campus of the Batchelor Institute is located within the town and provides tertiary and vocational education and training with a focus on outcomes for indigenous students. Other tertiary education options are available through Charles Darwin University with campuses located in Darwin and Palmerston.

Located on the BIITE campus is Yera Children's service providing care for children aged 0–6 operated by One Tree Community services, a not-for-profit organisation.

=== Transport ===
The primary access route between Darwin and Batchelor is via the Stuart Highway and Batchelor Road, the southern turn off for Litchfield National Park. Until its closure in 1976, the town was served by a station on the North Australia Railway. The current Adelaide-Darwin Railway alignment passes several kilometres to the east of the town but no station facilities are provided. Interstate Greyhound Australia coach services pick up/set down point is at the junction of Batchelor Road and the Stuart Highway. Additionally, tour busses travelling to Litchfield park will often visit the town as a refreshment stop.

Batchelor Airfield has a sealed runway suitable for light aircraft and is occasionally used for medical evacuation flights. Several aviation companies offer scenic flights and charter services at the airport. In October 2014, the airfield was used in filming an episode of BBC series Top Gear. Interstate and international flights are available at Darwin Airport, about a one-hour drive from the town.

=== Public facilities ===
The offices of the Coomalie Community Government Council are located on the outskirts of the town, and as such many local and territory government services are accessible. The town has a library with internet access (available at a charge), which is open to the public on Friday evenings and Sunday afternoons, police station, post office and a public swimming pool. There are also community sports facilities including playing fields, a skate park and basketball courts.

=== Utilities ===
A large electricity substation owned by PowerWater is located at Batchelor and the town's power supply is sourced from the high voltage transmission lines that run through the area between Darwin and Katherine. The town is located close to significant water resources including two major dams and ground water aquifers which provided water for drinking and irrigation. Batchelor is the main waste management facility for the Coomalie Shire.

== Media ==
Batchelor Institute's Indigenous Media Unit holds a licence for Radio Rum Jungle, broadcast on 97.3 FM. The station has been in operation from the Batchelor campus since 1987. Additionally, the Government owned Australian Broadcasting Corporation also has local transmitters for national services ABC Radio National (92.1 FM) and youth station Triple J (92.9 FM).

Batchelor receives digital television services from Darwin broadcast by the Nine Network (9, GO! and Gem), Southern Cross (SC7, 7Two and 7Mate), Darwin Digital Television (10, OneHD and 11) as well as all ABC and SBS channels. Additionally, Imparja Television can be received by terrestrial analogue broadcasts. Subscription television services via satellite are also available through Austar.

The Northern Territory News and Sunday Territorian published by News Corp Australia are the main newspapers circulated in Batchelor.

== See also ==
- Nellie Flynn
- Winchester mine
