= Alice Kirkby Goyder =

British artist

- Born: 8 December 1875; Bradford, England
- Died: 20 February 1964 (aged 88); Suffolk, England
- Education: Bradford School of Art
- Known for: Painting, etching

Alice Kirkby Goyder, or Alice Kirkeley Goyder, (8 December 1875 – 20 February 1964) was a British artist known for her depictions of animals and landscapes, in both paintings and etchings.

== Biography ==
Goyder was born in Bradford in West Yorkshire, and was one of the four children born to a local physician and his wife who was from Ripon. Goyder studied at the Bradford School of Art and after a spell in London, returned to Bradford. Goyder also took lessons at the art school established by Louise Jopling.

Goyder painted animal figures and also landscapes in both oils and watercolours, while also working in drypoint, etching and with woodcarvings. She won a silver medal at the 1897 Women Artist's Exhibition. Between 1899 and 1939 she was a regular exhibitor at the Royal Academy in London and also had a long exhibition record with the Society of Women Artists from 1900 to 1953. She also exhibited at the Walker Art Gallery in Liverpool and was an active member of the Bradford Arts Club, the East Kent Art Society and the Ipswich Art Club, having lived at Faversham in Kent and then Orford in Suffolk later in her life. The British Museum holds examples of her etchings.
