= Adelaide River, Northern Territory =

Town in Northern Territory, Australia

Adelaide River
- Town
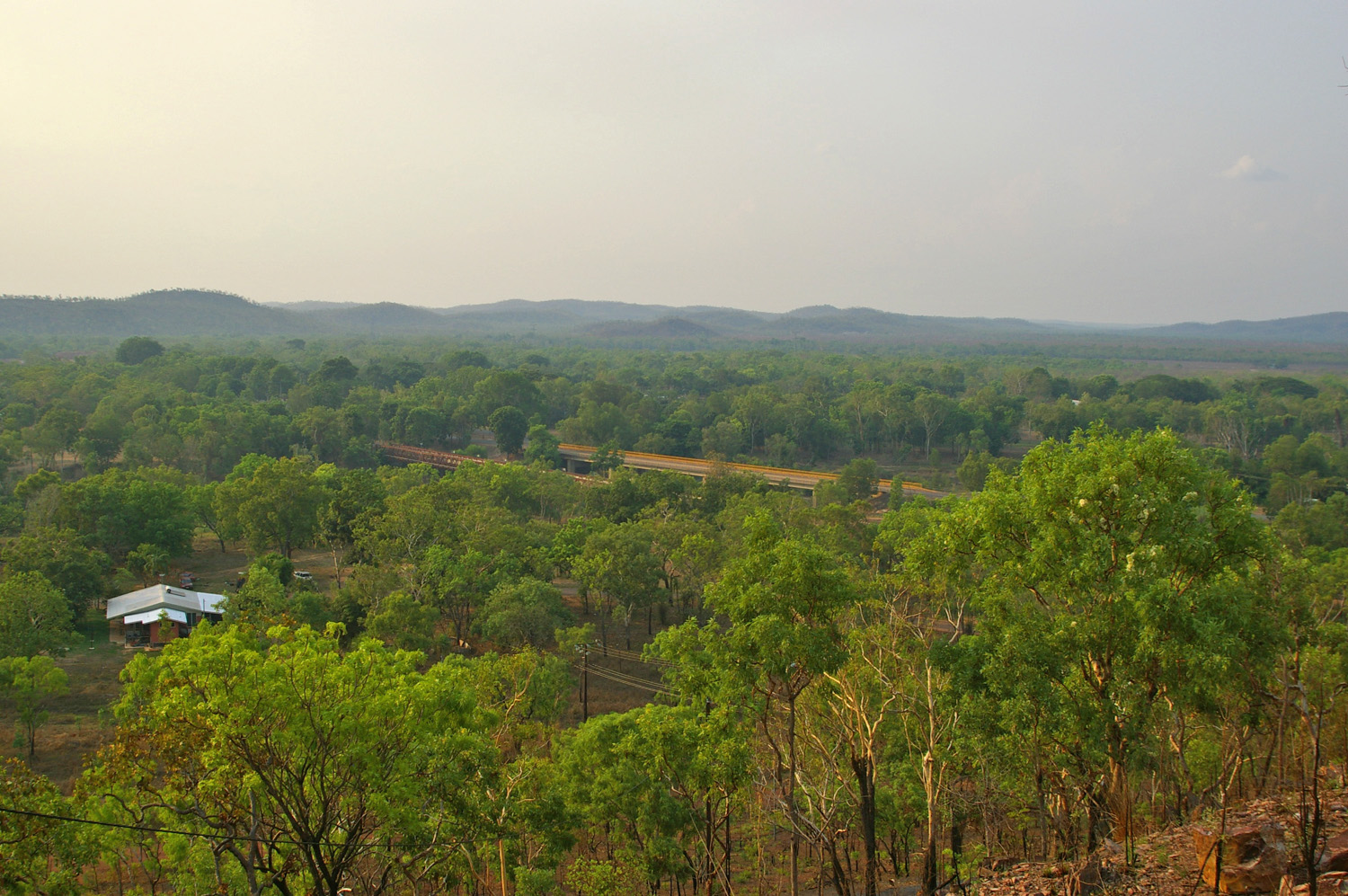
- View overlooking the town of Adelaide River.

- Coordinates: 13°14′16″S 131°06′17″E
- Country: Australia
- State: Northern Territory
- LGA: Coomalie Shire
- Location: 113 km (70 mi) from Darwin; 205 km (127 mi) from Katherine
- Established: 11 January 1962 (town); 29 October 1997 (locality)

Government
  - Territory electorate: Daly
  - Federal division: Lingiari

Population
  - Total: 317 (2021 census)
- Time zone: UTC+9:30 (ACST)
- Postcode: 0846
- Mean max temp: 33.7 °C (92.7 °F)
- Mean min temp: 21.2 °C (70.2 °F)
- Annual rainfall: 1,564.4 mm (61.59 in)
Localities around Adelaide River
Batchelor	Tortilla Flats	Margaret River
Batchelor; Stapleton; Litchfield Park	Adelaide River	Margaret River
Litchfield Park	Robin Falls; Margaret River	Margaret River

Adelaide River is a small but historically significant town located at the crossing of the Stuart Highway over the Adelaide River in the Northern Territory of Australia. The town is upstream of the Adelaide and Mary River Floodplains Important Bird Area. At the 2021 census, Adelaide River had a population of 317. Adelaide River is part of the Coomalie Shire and is the second largest settlement (after Batchelor) in the local government area.

== History ==
=== Pre-European settlement ===
The Kungarrakan and Awarai Aboriginal peoples are acknowledged as the traditional owners of the land surrounding the present day town of Adelaide River. There was little acknowledgement of their connection to the land in the early history of the area, evidenced by the predominantly European place names. Their way of life remained unchanged for many thousands of years prior to settlement.

=== Settlement and railway ===
Adelaide River was first settled by workers who arrived in the area to construct the Overland Telegraph Line. During construction, the discovery of gold at Pine Creek in 1872 had a major impact on the settlement.

In 1873, a weekly mail service between Southport and a mining site further south at Yam Creek was established. This service utilised pack horses, and during the wet season months when progress was slow mail bags from the north and south were exchanged at the crossing of the Adelaide River. The following year, Mr. Edward Hopewell was awarded this mail contract and built the Q.C.E. Hotel on the river bank and a restaurant, the "Jolly Waggoner" was opened by George Doherty, increasing the importance of the area as an overnight stop for travellers. The first police station in the town was constructed in 1879.

Prior to the construction of the railway to Pine Creek, the Adelaide River crossing was the overnight stopping point for the Haimes Royal Mail Coach which linked Southport with the goldfields. This was a vital and well utilised transport link, but was a slow and uncomfortable service. Legislation providing for an upgraded transport link was passed in 1883 by the government of John Cox Bray in the form of the Palmerston and Pine Creek Railway Bill.

In 1886 a contract was signed between the Government of South Australia and construction firm C&E Millar to build the railway between Port Darwin (then known as Palmerston) and the goldfields at Pine Creek. By April 1888 the railway had reached Adelaide River. Construction of the 155 metres (509 ft) long steel girder across the river itself used five 31 metres (102 ft) spans supported on four sets of piers. The bridge was all but complete by the onset of the wet season later that year. The first train to cross reached the southern bank on 3 December 1888, followed five days later by the first scheduled service, hauled by the locomotive "Silverton".

=== Early 20th century ===
Pastoral and agricultural activity were stimulated with the issuing of leases for Crown Land. In 1911 brothers Frank and Fred Hardy, local buffalo hunters, established Mount Bundy Station on an 834sq mi pastoral lease near the town of Adelaide River. Using local Aboriginal stockmen to hunt and process the animals, they began exporting buffalo hide to European markets. During the 1920s, Dutch-born agriculturalist Edwin Verburg (1869–1965) established a farm in the township irrigated by a weir he constructed across the river.

Work began in 1936 on a road linking Darwin to Adelaide River. As the railway was still the primary means of transportation at this time, it was an unsealed, dry weather road that was poorly maintained. This road followed a similar route to the present day Stuart Highway. Around the same period, a road south towards the rail yards at Larrimah was also developed to a similar standard.

=== World War II ===
Adelaide River played a central role in the defence of Australia during the second world war. In 1939, the town was designated as a rest area for personnel serving in Darwin, Northern Territory.

Military activity around the area increased significantly following the first Japanese air-raids on Darwin on 19 February 1942. The immediate aftermath of these attacks led to a mass-exodus of the city's civilian population toward the south, an event that would become known as the Adelaide River Stakes. The allied response was a significant increase of forces to rebuild and greatly expand defences in the region. A military airfield was built in the town close to the railway station, along with several others in the surrounding district including Coomalie Creek and Pell. In addition an artillery and weapons range was established at Tortilla Flats, between Coomalie Creek and Adelaide River. The town became an important tactical supply and communications base for all branches of the armed forces. In August 1942, the Adelaide River War Cemetery was established.

While there were numerous bombing raids on the surrounding outstations and facilities throughout 1942–43, Adelaide River itself was bombed only once, in the early hours of 12 November 1943. This was the last Japanese air raid on the Northern Territory. At the height of hostilities, there were up to 30,000 Australian Army and United States soldiers based near the town. An ammunition dump, including a spur railway line, was established at Snake Creek, 2 mi (3.2 km) to the north. Whilst the facility became operational towards the end of the war, it was too late to be useful in the war effort. Additional rail sidings were built at the town station to serve ambulance or "hospital" trains that brought wounded personnel to the field hospitals in the area. In addition to many transient units, the 107th Australian General Hospital and 119th Australian General Hospital were set up within Adelaide River.

Some of the major units deployed or detached to Adelaide River during the war included:

==== 2nd AIF ====
- 27th Australian Infantry Battalion
- 28th Australian Infantry Battalion
- 1st Australian Field Survey Section, Royal Australian Engineers
- 119th Australian General Hospital
- 6th Army Topographical Survey Company, Royal Australian Survey Corps
- 1st Australian Farm Coy. Royal Australian Army Service Corps
- 121st Australian General Transport Coy.
- 140th Australian General Transport Coy.
- AACS (Australian Army Canteens Service)

==== Royal Australian Air Force ====
- HQ North-West Area
- No. 2 Base Personnel Staff Office
- No. 24 Wing
- No. 44 Wing RAAF
- No. 161 Radar Station RAAF
- No. 321 Radar Station RAAF
- 11 Signals Unit RAAF
- No. 8 RAAF Postal Unit

==== Royal Australian Navy ====
- RAN Armament Depot Snake Creek
- RAN Wireless Transmitting Station (Standby Facility)

==== United States units ====
- 997th Signal Service Battalion
- 135th Medical Regiment
- Fleet Radio Unit, Adelaide River (USN)
- 43rd Material Squadron, Air Technical Service Command, USAAF
- 709th Ordnance Co.
- 24th Signal Platoon

During the war years, the road to Darwin which would become the Stuart Highway was sealed to cope with an increase in vehicular movements between military camps in the district. By 1943 over 2000 vehicles were using the road per day. The original rail bridge was upgraded with timber decking to allow it to be used by road vehicles as well as trains.

==== War Cemetery ====
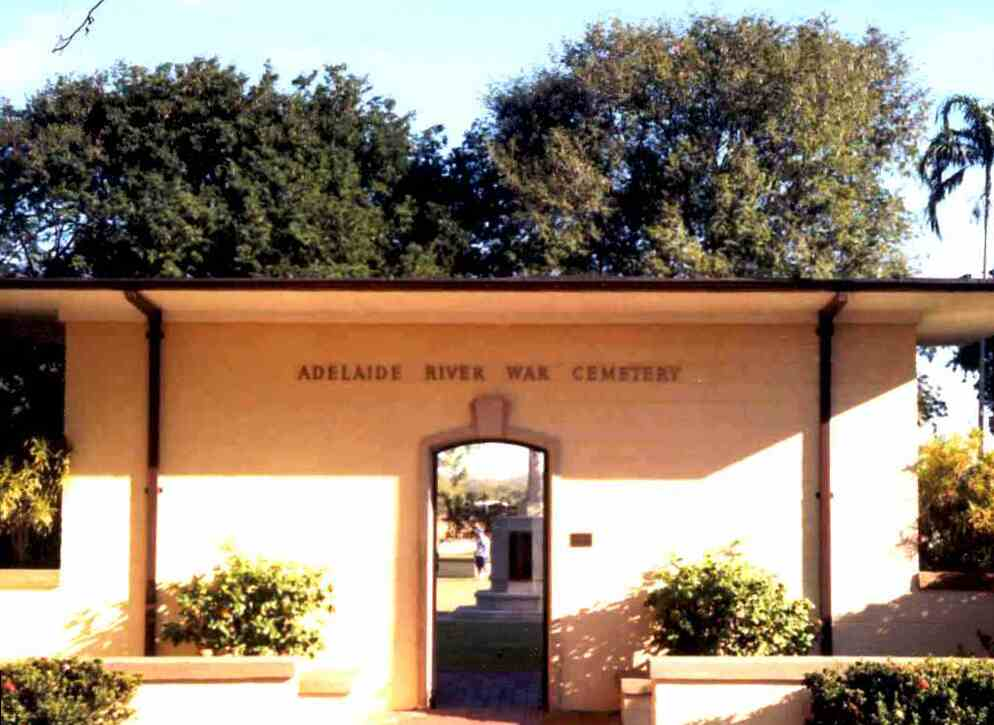
Entrance to Adelaide River War Cemetery

The Adelaide River War Cemetery was established in 1942 following the Bombing of Darwin. It was used by the army field hospitals in the area to bury service personnel who were killed in action. Control of the cemetery was handed over to the Commonwealth War Graves Commission in 1947. The cemetery has a memorial to missing personnel serving in the area whose remains were never found. It is set on the banks of the river and is maintained with lush green lawns, and floral garden beds all year round.

=== 1945 – present day ===
On 11 January 1962, Adelaide River was officially proclaimed a town. The gazetted area comprises 626.8ha. Declining passenger numbers on the North Australia Railway led to services on the line being suspended in 1976. The line was officially closed in 1981 along with the Adelaide River station, but even with maintenance gangs withdrawn, the yard and facilities remained mostly intact. The 1888 bridge continued to be used as a river crossing to convey traffic on the Stuart Highway. A second crossing, this time dedicated to road transport, the Edwin Verburg Bridge, now carries the highway across the river. It was opened on 27 March 1980 by Chief Minister Paul Everingham. The bridge was named for the pioneering agriculturalist who established an early farm in the town.

Adelaide River police Sergeant Glen Huitson was shot and killed while on duty by fugitive Rodney Ansell on 3 August 1999 on the Old Bynoe Rd near Livingstone. An unarmed civilian was also wounded in the fire fight. Sgt. Huitson was posthumously awarded several bravery medals over the incident. A park in the town was dedicated in his honour.

In 2001, the Adelaide River Railway Heritage Precinct was established to restore and maintain the station as a museum and preserve the railway heritage of the town. A third river crossing was opened on 29 July 2003 as part of the construction for the northern section of the Adelaide-Darwin Railway. The first scheduled trains from Adelaide began to operate through the town in 2004. While the original station is adjacent to the new line, it is not currently a stopping point.

== Present day ==
The town remains an important rest stop for travellers on the Stuart Highway and offers fuel, mechanical repairs and accommodation. It also functions as a service centre for the agriculture and horticulture activities in the surrounding area. The town boasts a number of tourist attractions. Government services provided in the town include the Post Office, police station, fire station and a Remote Health Clinic. Businesses on the main street include 2 petrol outlets (including a large BP Roadhouse with diner and convenience store used as a refreshment stop for Interstate coach services passing through town and is open till midnight 7 days a week), a general store and the Adelaide River Inn hotel located behind the bp service station

== Community facilities ==
=== Health ===
The town is serviced by a Remote Health Centre run by the Northern Territory Government. The centre has 2 full-time nurses, and a GP is available for consultations on selected days. The centre is open Monday to Friday, but remains staffed 24 hours for emergencies.

=== Education ===
Adelaide River has a small primary school, Adelaide River School, with 42 enrolments (as of August 2010). The school was established in 1950 and moved to is current site, 100 m from the Adelaide River itself, in 1956. A building housing the administration office and library was added along with a canteen for students in 1994. The school features large solar panels on the main building's roof to sustain the school's electrical requirements. These were installed with a grant funded through the National Solar Schools Program. Any surplus electricity goes into the small town's supply.

The nearest secondary schools and tertiary education facilities are located in Batchelor.

=== Parks and recreation ===
The Adelaide River Show Society (ARSS) precinct is located on the southern side of the river and is a 24 ha (59-acre) site incorporating display pavilions, a caravan park, a public swimming pool and the only grass turf racing track in the Northern Territory. The showgrounds is home to a number of community and sporting organisations. The ARSS precinct hosts annual events including the Adelaide River Show and the Adelaide River Races.

== Events and attractions ==
Adelaide River Railway Heritage Precinct occupies the area surrounding the historic railway station located on the southern side of the river. The precinct operates as a museum and has several restored vehicles and items of rolling stock from the original North Australia Railway on display, as well as maintaining the buildings. A society of "friends" of the precinct aim to restore a section of the track between Adelaide River Station and the old Snake Creek armoury using the original 1888 bridge and operate a heritage train, however the construction and alignment of the Adelaide-Darwin Railway has created obstacles to the completion of this project.

The Adelaide River Races were first run in 1942, and are held annually at the ARSS Showgrounds in the beginning of the dry season. The event attracts visitors from all over Australia and continues to grow in size and popularity each year.

== Climate ==
Adelaide River has a tropical savanna climate (Köppen: Aw).

Climate data for Adelaide River
Month	Jan	Feb	Mar	Apr	May	Jun	Jul	Aug	Sep	Oct	Nov	Dec	Year
Mean daily maximum °C (°F)	31.9 (89.4)	31.7 (89.1)	32.6 (90.7)	33.3 (91.9)	32.1 (89.8)	30.6 (87.1)	30.8 (87.4)	32.2 (90.0)	34.8 (94.6)	35.8 (96.4)	34.8 (94.6)	33.2 (91.8)	32.8 (91.1)
Daily mean °C (°F)	27.7 (81.9)	27.5 (81.5)	27.8 (82.0)	27.7 (81.9)	25.9 (78.6)	24.0 (75.2)	23.9 (75.0)	25.1 (77.2)	28.0 (82.4)	29.5 (85.1)	29.1 (84.4)	28.4 (83.1)	27.1 (80.7)
Mean daily minimum °C (°F)	24.7 (76.5)	24.5 (76.1)	24.3 (75.7)	23.1 (73.6)	20.7 (69.3)	18.5 (65.3)	17.8 (64.0)	18.3 (64.9)	21.7 (71.1)	24.2 (75.6)	24.8 (76.6)	24.8 (76.6)	22.3 (72.1)
Average precipitation mm (inches)	326.0 (12.83)	303.3 (11.94)	217.3 (8.56)	57.1 (2.25)	13.0 (0.51)	1.9 (0.07)	1.3 (0.05)	0.9 (0.04)	7.2 (0.28)	34.0 (1.34)	130.2 (5.13)	283.0 (11.14)	1,375.2 (54.14)
Source: Weather.Directory

== Trivia ==
"Charlie" the Buffalo, made famous by the 1986 movie "Crocodile" Dundee was a beloved local resident until his death in 2000. He is now stuffed, and in the bar at the Adelaide River Inn.
