= Coomalie Community Government Council =

Coordinates: 13°04′S 131°01′E

- Local government area
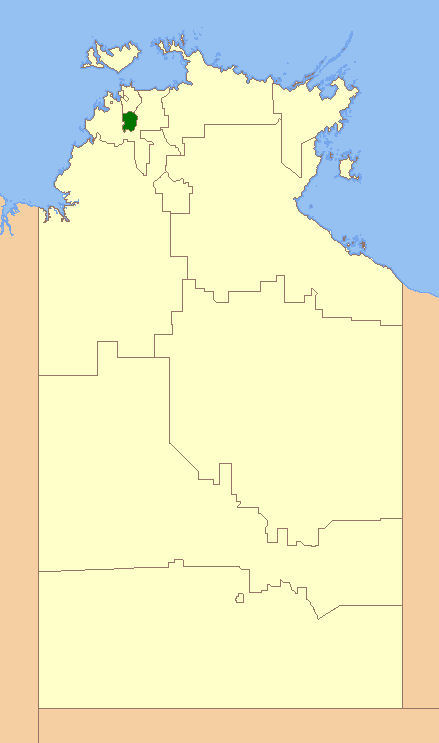
- Location of the Coomalie Community Government Council

- Interactive map of Coomalie Community Government Council
- Country: Australia
- State: Northern Territory
- Region: outer Darwin
- Established: 1990
- Council seat: Batchelor

Government
  - Territory electorate: Daly
  - Federal division: Lingiari

Area
  - Total: 2,056 km^{2} (794 sq mi)

Population
  - Total: 1,276 (2021 census)
  - Density: 0.6206/km^{2} (1.6074/sq mi)
- Website: Coomalie Community Government Council
LGAs around Coomalie Community Government Council
Unincorporated Top End Region	Litchfield	Unincorporated Top End Region
Unincorporated Top End Region	Coomalie Community Government Council	Unincorporated Top End Region
Unincorporated Top End Region	Unincorporated Top End Region	Unincorporated Top End Region

The Coomalie Community Government Council is a local government area in Australia's Northern Territory, situated south of Darwin and Palmerston. The council governs an area of 2,056 km^{2} (794 sq mi). The shire had a population of 1,276 at the 2021 census.

== History ==
Coomalie Community Government Council was established on 7 December 1990, and its first elections were held in 1997. On 1 July 2008, Coomalie Council became one of the 11 Shires in the territory, changed by the Northern Territory Government. It was put under official management of the Northern Territory government in July 2024 and dismissed in May 2025 after an investigation found what had been described as "serious and sustained deficiencies".

== Wards ==
The council is divided up into three wards, which are governed by 6 councillors:

- Batchelor Township Ward (2) (Batchelor)
- Adelaide River Ward (2) (Adelaide River)
- Coomalie Rural Ward (2) (Rural areas surrounding Batchelor including Lake Bennett)

== Townships ==
The Shire includes the following localities:

- Adelaide River
- Batchelor
- Camp Creek
- Collett Creek
- Coomalie Creek
- Darwin River
- Eva Valley
- Finniss Valley
- Lake Bennett
- Rum Jungle
- Stapleton
- Tortilla Flats

The boundary of this area extends from the Manton Dam in the north, to the town of Adelaide River in the south and east from the Adelaide River, to the Litchfield National Park in the west.

== See also ==
- Local government areas of the Northern Territory
