= Eva Valley =

- Suburb
- Coordinates: 13°07′26″S 131°00′27″E
- Country: Australia
- State: Northern Territory
- LGA: Coomalie Shire
- Location: 110 km (68 mi) S of Darwin; 10 km (6.2 mi) SW of Batchelor
- Established: 29 October 1997 (locality)

Government
  - Territory electorate: Daly
  - Federal division: Lingiari

Population
  - Total: 94 (2016 census)
- Postcode: 0845
Suburbs around Eva Valley
Finniss Valley	Finniss Valley; Batchelor	Batchelor
Camp Creek	Eva Valley	Batchelor; Stapleton
Camp Creek	Stapleton	Stapleton

Eva Valley is a rural locality in the Coomalie Shire, Northern Territory, Australia. It is located approximately 10 kilometres (6.2 mi) southwest of the town of Batchelor and 110 kilometres (68 mi) south of the Territory capital Darwin.

The locality was originally a large property known as Banyan Farm, but it was sold to the Childs family during the 1960s and renamed Eva Valley after one of the new owners, Eva Childs. The name has been retained with the subdivision of the area.
