= Mount Bundy Station =

Pastoral lease in the Northern Territory

Coordinates: 13.228°S 131.134°E

Location in Northern Territory

Mount Bundy Station is a pastoral lease that operates as a cattle station in the Northern Territory of Australia.

The property is situated approximately 4 kilometres (2 mi) east of Adelaide River and 130 kilometres (81 mi) south of Darwin. It is situated on the banks of the Adelaide River on its northern boundary. The majority of the property is composed of savannah woodland.

Established in 1911, one of the first in the Northern Territory, the station originally occupied an area of 834 square miles (2,160 km^{2}) with the boundaries once located within Litchfield National Park and Kakadu National Park. Mount Bundy was established by brothers Frank and Hubert Fred Hardy, who were both renowned buffalo hunters. Fred died when he fell from his horse at Mount Bundy in 1940, aged 59 years. During the second world war the American forces set up an airbase at Mount Bundy for repairing bombers. The property was acquired in the 1960s by the W. R. Grace Company, and developed as one of the largest cattle ranches of its time, consisting of over 1.1 million acres, and carried over 30,000 buffalo and 20,000 head of Brahman cattle. The property is now much smaller as Grace exited various parts of the business. The tourist resort portion of the station was on the market in 2014 with an asking price of just under A$2 million.

== See also ==
- List of ranches and stations
