= Edith Alexandra White =

Australian army matron (1901–1988)

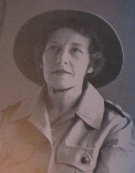
- from her autobiography
- Born: 28 January 1901; Grafton, New South Wales, Australia
- Died: 25 May 1988 (aged 87); Kenmore, Queensland, Australia
- Occupation: matron

Edith Alexandra McQuade White (28 January 1901 – 25 May 1988) was an Australian army matron. She rose to the rank of Lieutenant colonel. After the Bombing of Darwin, her 1,200 bed, under canvas, hospital dealt with the many casualties.

== Life ==
White was born like her parents in New South Wales. She was born in Grafton and her parents were Catherine Jane (born Roberts) and Joseph Alexander Alfred White. Her father kept accounts. He went to South Africa during the war there and when peace came she and the family went to South Africa too. She went to a convent school in Grahamstown. In 1919 the family moved again to Queensland where, in time, she trained to be a nurse at Brisbane General Hospital. She went on to train in midwifery after she qualified in 1928.

In 1937 she moved to the Northern Territory working at different places including the state capital of Darwin. She was eventually released from essential civilian work to become the matron of the 119th Australian General Hospital in June 1941. This was a large hospital that had 1,200 beds but all of the hospital was in tents.

Australia had declared war on Japan and on 19 February 1942 the Bombing of Darwin took place. It was the largest attack ever on Australia. White was later to remark that her nurses worked without a break for 36 hours as they dealt with the resulting casualties.

She was promoted to the rank of Lieutenant colonel. In 1950 she published her memoir, Reminiscences of an Australian Army Nurse.

White died in 1988 in Kenmore, Queensland. In the chapel of Tamworth Base Hospital she is included on an honour role recording her contribution.
