= Coomalie Creek, Northern Territory =

Coomalie Creek Northern Territory
- Coordinates: 13°00′03″S 131°10′39″E
- Population: 20 (2016 census)
- Established: 29 October 1997
- Postcode(s): 0822
- Time zone: ACST (UTC+9:30)
- Location: 72 km (45 mi) SE of Darwin City
- LGA(s): Coomalie Shire
- Territory electorate(s): Daly
- Federal division(s): Lingiari
Mean max temp	Mean min temp	Annual rainfall
33.7 °C; 93 °F	21.2 °C; 70 °F	1,564.4 mm 61.6 in
Suburbs around Coomalie Creek:
Darwin River Dam	Darwin River Dam; Lake Bennett	Marrakai
Rum Jungle; Batchelor	Coomalie Creek	Marrakai; Margaret River
Batchelor	Batchelor; Tortilla Flats	Margaret River
- Footnotes: Locations; Adjoining localities

Coomalie Creek is a locality in the Northern Territory of Australia located about 72 kilometres (45 mi) south-east of the territory capital of Darwin.

The locality consists of land bounded to the east by the Adelaide River and whose western boundary lies the immediate west of the Stuart Highway which passes through the locality in a north–south alignment. This locality is named after Coomalie Creek, which flows through the locality, and whose name is considered to be corruption of the aboriginal name, Gumili. Its boundaries and name were gazetted on 29 October 1997.

The 2016 Australian census which was conducted in August 2016 reports that Coomalie Creek had 20 people living within its boundaries.

Coomalie Creek is located within the federal division of Lingiari, the territory electoral division of Daly and within the local government area of the Coomalie Shire.

During World War II, Coomalie Creek Airfield was constructed by the Royal Australian Air Force in the locality, which was bombed by Japanese forces on several occasions. Although it is on private land, the airfield has been partially restored and along with an anti-aircraft defence battery nearby, are some of the most intact examples of wartime infrastructure in the Northern Territory. Both are heritage-listed.
