= Hundred of Goyder (Northern Territory) =

Coordinates: 13°01′12″S 130°59′06″E

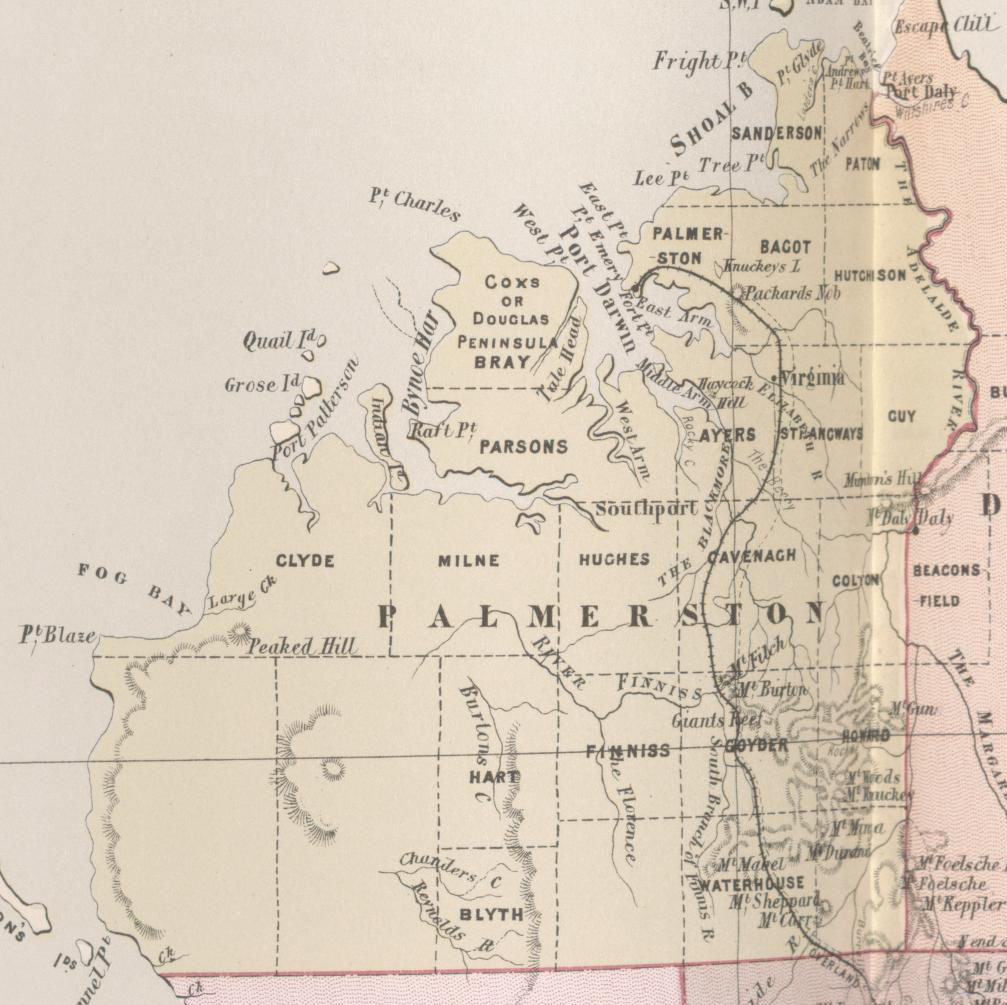
Map of Palmerston County in 1886, showing the hundreds.

The Hundred of Goyder is a hundred in the Northern Territory of Australia which was part of the now-lapsed cadastral unit of the County of Palmerston.

Goyder lies south of Darwin in the Batchelor area and is named after George Woodroffe Goyder, who was responsible for the major survey of the Town of Palmerston (Darwin). The Hundred of Goyder was one of the first 13 Hundreds gazetted in 1871.

One of the main industries in the Hundred is Uranium mining.
