= Coomalie Creek Airfield =

Former Royal Australian Air Force airfield in the Northern Territory

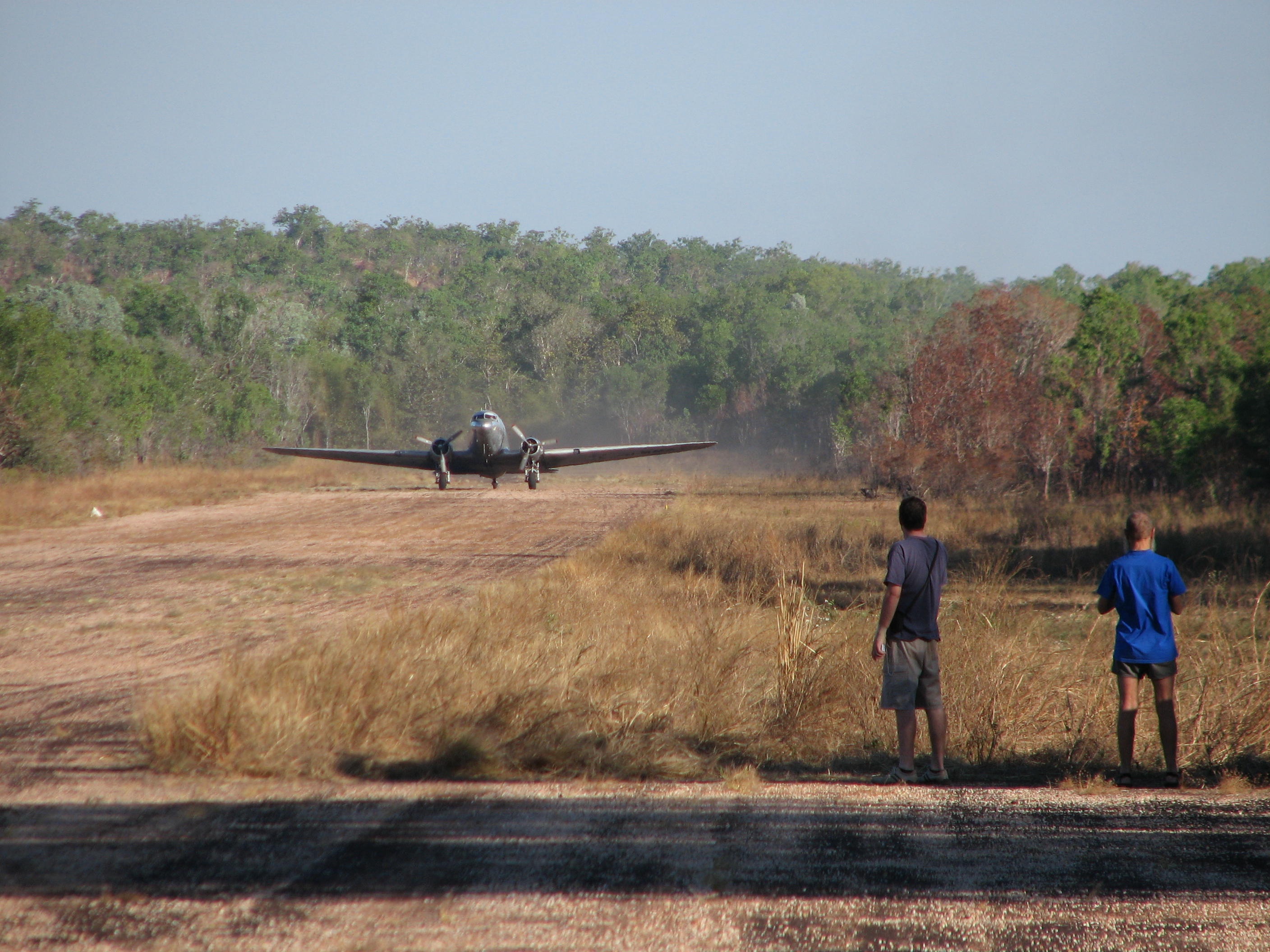
- Coomalie Creek Airfield in 2008 with a Dakota aircraft on the airstrip
- IATA: none; ICAO: YCCR

Summary
- Airport type: Private
- Owner: Richard Luxton
- Location: Coomalie Creek, Northern Territory
- Elevation AMSL: 175 ft / 53 m
- Coordinates: 13°00′35.5″S 131°07′49″E

Map
- Location of airport in Northern Territory

Runways
Direction	Length		Surface
Direction	ft	m	Surface
17/35	4,986	1,520	Gravel

Coomalie Creek Airfield was a Royal Australian Air Force (RAAF) airfield built in 1942 during World War II at what is now the locality of Coomalie Creek, Northern Territory, Australia. The airfield fell into disuse after the war ended. Since purchasing the surrounding land in 1977, private owners have restored the runway and rebuilt some wartime buildings to preserve the airfield's history. It was listed on the Northern Territory Heritage Register in 2011, along with a nearby anti-aircraft battery that was used for airfield defence.

== History ==
The airfield was operated by No. 54 Operational Base Unit RAAF. The first unit to arrive was No. 31 Squadron, equipped with Bristol Beaufighters, in November 1942.

No. 1 Photo Reconnaissance Unit RAAF (1PRU) arrived at the airfield in 1943 equipped with Lockheed P-38 Lightnings, de Havilland Mosquitos and CAC Wirraways. 1PRU was re-designated No. 87 Squadron RAAF on 10 September 1944.

In November 1944, three Douglas Dakotas from No. 34 Squadron were detached to the airfield, prior to staging north of Australia.

No. 87 Squadron launched the last Australia-based operational RAAF mission of World War II from Coomalie Creek. The airfield was abandoned after World War II and is now in private ownership.

Part of Leg 9 of The Amazing Race 9 was conducted at Coomalie Creek Airfield.

== Japanese air raids ==
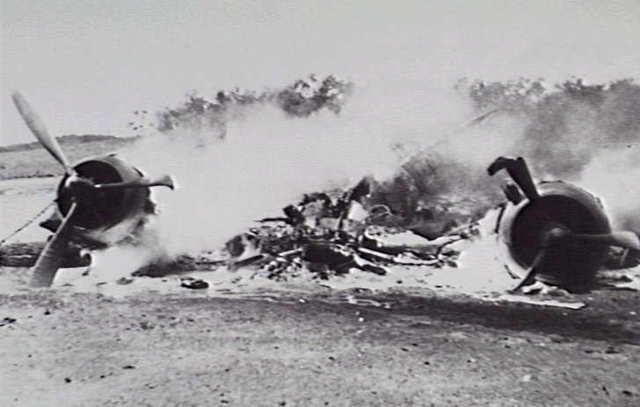
A No. 31 Squadron Beaufighter burning at Coomalie Creek after a Japanese air raid in November 1942

- 23 November 1942
- 27 November 1942
- 2 March 1943
- 13 August 1943
- 21 August 1943
- 10 November 1943

== See also ==
- List of airports in the Northern Territory
