= Survey parties to the Northern Territory 1864–1870 =

Expeditions from South Australia to the Northern Territory, 1864–1870

Several survey parties were sent by the South Australian Government to the "Top End" of the Northern Territory during the years 1864–1870, preparatory to founding a settlement. This article describes those attempts and the people involved. It includes lists of all known participants.

== Background ==
In 1863, the part of New South Wales to the north of South Australia between the 129th and 138th parallels of longitude East was annexed to South Australia, by letters patent, as the "Northern Territory of South Australia", which was abbreviated to the Northern Territory (6 July 1863). The South Australian Government, with the Wakefield plan for colonisation of South Australia as a basis, believed that European settlement of the Northern Territory could be achieved in much the same way: by selling "off the plan" parcels of land to investors, and a great deal of money would go into Government coffers, which would be used for infrastructure, thus attracting further investment. All that was required was another Col. William Light, another George Gawler and a location for the new capital, which from the start was to be named "Palmerston".

== Finniss expedition to Adam Bay 1864 ==
The first requirement for such a settlement was a safe harbour, and from previous explorers' experience, one stood out: Adam Bay, into which the Adelaide River flows, a river navigable for a considerable distance, where all kinds of wharfs and berths could be erected. There was little land at the mouth for buildings, but no doubt suitable areas would be found upstream.

Boyle Travers Finniss, a career public servant with some surveying experience, was appointed Government Resident (Note: "The Government Resident of the Northern Territory was appointed by the South Australian Government in 1864 as a result of the passing of the Northern Territory Act 1863. The Government Resident was responsible for the administration of the Northern Territory while it was under South Australian control.") put in charge of a body of some 40 officers and men, and whose task it was to establish a camp at a site of his choosing and mark out some 1000 town sites and a similar number of rural sites.

Finniss was not obliged to settle at Adam Bay; he chose it in preference to Port Darwin or Port Patterson on account of its harbour and the Adelaide River, which is navigable for a great distance inland, ignoring the lack of building materials, the low-lying boggy nature of the country. He chose two settlement sites; Escape Cliffs on the east coast of the bay, and The Narrows, a short distance up the Adelaide River, where there was a good landing for boats, and planned a connecting road of 6 miles (10 km).

No substantial building was ever erected, apart from the Government Resident's house, in front of which he daily drilled his guard, to the delight of the natives, who mimicked their exercises.

No surveying could be done in first dry season due to insufficient manpower; much of the stores never made it under cover, and much manpower was wasted keeping a lookout for marauding Aboriginals. The Protector of Aborigines, Dr. Goldsmith, was refused membership of a party sent to recover stolen property, which turned into a reprisal. Later, after some horses were speared, he was refused inclusion in an armed party led by Finniss's son, when many shots were fired and at least one Aboriginal man was killed.

Morale was low from the start. Only the Government Resident (Finniss) and his few "favourites" refused to admit that the choice of site was a huge mistake. Jealousies developed between various sections of the workforce as to who was getting preferential treatment or having the more odious duties to perform, the Government Resident and Surgeon (Sweet) were seen going off on "jaunts" with "favorites". Jealousies erupted and operations stumbled from crisis to crisis. Many men whose one-year contract was up, left for home aboard Bengal in May 1865, a long trip, as it was to sail via Koepang, also expensive, as they had to pay for their own passage.

The Ellen Lewis arrived on 5 November 1865 with the McKinlay party and Finniss's replacement staff, and left on 1 December with Finniss, who had been recalled to answer various accusations, also his son and 37 others — some being called as witnesses or to answer charges related to the murder of several Aboriginals. Others had resigned, paying their own way back to Adelaide.

Surveyor R. H. Edmunds, and Jeremiah Ryan, John Young, and Edward Tuckwell transferred to McKinlay's party, bringing its numbers to 14. Surveyor Manton, left in charge of the depleted party, reported that it was certain there was no land within a hundred miles worth surveying, and they could do nothing more than protect themselves and their stores from the natives. Manton proved no less tyrannical and arbitrary a leader than Finniss. One group, under William McMinn decided to risk their lives in an open boat, the Forlorn Hope. In October 1866 Government ordered a recall of Manton and his men, along with those remaining of McKinlay's party (another debacle, see below), on the steamer Eagle, Captain Hill, which left 11 January 1867, transhipped to the Rangatira at Sydney, and arrived at Port Adelaide 2 February 1867.

=== Personnel ===
Name	Job/position	Depart Adelaide	Depart Adam Bay	Notes
R. Arthur	in charge of stock	Ellen Lewis May 1866	Eagle January 1867	
J. Railton Atkinson	chainman	Henry Ellis April 1864	Bengal May 1865	sacked by Finniss. From Surabaya to Singapore with Cottrell, died in India.
William Patrick Auld	labourer	Henry Ellis April 1864	Bengal May 1865 in charge of Sgt. Potter	killed Aboriginal man 8 September 1864 near Chambers Bay, Northern Territory
Job Austin (died 1909)	visitor	South Australian October 1864 (privately); Bengal March 1865	South Australian December 1864 Ellen Lewis December 1865	later with Goyder expedition, Overland Telegraph (OT) project
William Nicholas M. de Bathe (c. 1846 – 4 December 1868)	labourer	South Australian October 1864		No further mention, so likely he failed to depart. He was son of horse breeder James Bathe, owner of Graham's Castle, Prospect.
Samuel Baker	labourer	Henry Ellis April 1864	Ellen Lewis December 1865	died 28 March 1868
Jacob Bauer (Note: Bauer was described by Margaret Goyder Kerr as a "German gentleman of scientific tastes [devoted to] rain gauges and barometers". Previously employed by the Melbourne Observatory, he recorded much meteorological data at Escape Cliffs in 1865.)	Intended settler and agent for land purchasers, accompanied by wife Eliza and ten-year-old son Alfred.	South Australian October 1864 (privately)		Denied access to store by Manton, but supplied food by the men from their rations. Drowned 12 October 1866 after falling from boat
Henry Baumgurtel (perhaps Henry Leslie Thomas Baumgurtel, died 1888)	labourer, miner	Henry Ellis April 1864	Ellen Lewis December 1865	
Robert Beard (c. 1814 – 19 December 1884)	visitor 1864 in charge of stock 1866	South Australian October 1864 (privately); Bengal March 1865; Ellen Lewis May 1866	Ellen Lewis December 1865; Eagle January 1867	also identified as "S. Beard"; later with Goyder expedition
John James Benham (died 24 April 1919)	visitor	Bengal March 1865	Eagle January 1867	
J. W. O. Bennett	Draftsman	Henry Ellis April 1864	Eagle January 1867	returned with Goyder expedition, speared to death
John Bohn	labourer and able seaman	Henry Ellis April 1864	Beatrice November 1864	testified for Finniss
Bastin Boucaut	labourer	Henry Ellis April 1864		died of fever 16 September 1864; brother of Sir J. P. Boucaut
Thomas Brennan	blacksmith	Henry Ellis April 1864	Ellen Lewis December 1865	
Charles Bright	Reporter for The Argus	South Australian October 1864	South Australian December 1864	
Edward Burford	labourer	South Australian October 1864	Ellen Lewis December 1865	
Robert Charles Burton	labourer coxswain	South Australian October 1864	Eagle January 1867	joined McKinlay's party July 1866 later with Goyder expedition, OT
Sam Caldwell	Land speculator and agent for John, Charles and Samuel Caldwell.	Bengal March 1865?		signed Stephen King testimonial remained with Manton December 1965
Stephen Chandler	labourer	Henry Ellis April 1864	Ellen Lewis December 1865	witness to murder of Aboriginal man 8 September 1864; died 29 March 1866 after drunken fight
G. C. Christie	visitor	South Australian October 1864 (privately); Bengal March 1865	Ellen Lewis December 1865	returned in poor health
John Cleland	visitor	Bengal March 1865	Eagle January 1867	joined McKinlay's party July 1866
William Congdon				signed testimonial to Stephen King Perhaps same person as "Condon" remaining with Manton,
George Thomas Cottrell	labourer	South Australian October 1864	Bengal May 1865, thence to Singapore with Atkinson	
John Cowie	shoemaker and labourer, cook	Henry Ellis April 1864	South Australian December 1864	
James Davis	labourer	South Australian October 1864	Forlorn Hope May 1865	
John Davis	ass. storekeeper	Henry Ellis April 1864; Ellen Lewis September 1865	Ellen Lewis December 1865; By Yatala to Timor for supplies December 1864; ship wrecked; ret. to Adelaide. Eagle January 1867	
Firmin Deacon	labourer	South Australian October 1864	Bengal May 1865	
James Deslandes	in charge of stock	Ellen Lewis May 1866	Eagle January 1867	
William Dougall perh. William Dugald	more info needed	Henry Ellis April 1864	Ellen Lewis December 1865	tried with Auld for murder of an Aboriginal man 8 September 1864. Perhaps the man named McDougall who left for England once he reached Melbourne so not called as witness.
James Douglas (same as James Hereford Douglas?)	labourer	South Australian October 1864	Ellen Lewis December 1865	later with Goyder expedition
C. Dutton	in charge of stock	Ellen Lewis May 1866	Eagle January 1867	
John Dyer	labourer and bullock-driver	Henry Ellis April 1864	Ellen Lewis December 1865	
G. F. Edmunds	labourer	South Australian October 1864	Bengal May 1865	
R. H. Edmunds	Surveyor	South Australian October 1864	Beatrice August 1866	joined McKinlay's party as surveyor and deputy leader November 1865. Surveyed Darwin with Gillman 1866; later superintendent of Yatala Labor Prison
Francis Edwards	labourer	Henry Ellis April 1864	Forlorn Hope May 1865	
Joseph Atkinson Ewart	in charge of stock	Ellen Lewis May 1866	Eagle January 1867	Son of prominent hotelier, member of Stuart's 5th expedition. later with Goyder expedition.
B. T. Finniss	leader and Government Resident	Henry Ellis April 1864	Ellen Lewis December 1865	
Frederick Robe "Fred" Finniss	chainman	Henry Ellis April 1864	Ellen Lewis December 1865	son of the Government Resident
R. E. Fisher	in charge of stock	Ellen Lewis May 1866	Eagle January 1867	
Walter Fisher	in charge of stock	Ellen Lewis May 1866	Eagle January 1867	
Michael Edward Fitch	chainman and Able Seaman	Henry Ellis April 1864	Ellen Lewis December 1865	later with Goyder expedition, OT, Post Office
David Francis	crew of Bengal?			fell out of boat Julia 18 January 1865 when making her fast at The Narrows, swept away in swift-moving water
James Gilbert	labourer	Henry Ellis April 1864	Bengal May 1865	
Thomas Sherlock Gillman	labourer	South Australian October 1864	Ellen Lewis December 1865	with R. H. Edmunds in Darwin 1866. Gillman died 24 January 1926
Francis Edward Goldsmith	Surgeon and Protector of Aborigines	Henry Ellis April 1864	Bengal May 1865	resigned
C. W. Grainer	visitor	South Australian October 1864 (privately)	Ellen Lewis December 1865	returned in poor health
D. Gray/Grey	in charge of stock	Ellen Lewis May 1866	Eagle January 1867	
Charles Hake	labourer	Henry Ellis April 1864	Forlorn Hope May 1865	
Arthur R. Hamilton	Junior Surveyor	Henry Ellis April 1864	Forlorn Hope May 1865	
Hern				Listed as remaining with Manton December 1865
James Hill	in charge of stock	Ellen Lewis May 1866	Eagle January 1867	
Francis Wrighton "Frank" Hood	labourer ass. storeman	South Australian October 1864	Eagle January 1867	
John Absalom Howe	carpenter	Henry Ellis April 1864	South Australian December 1864	
Charles Stephen Hulls	labourer	South Australian October 1864	Eagle January 1867	joined McKinlay's party November 1865
David Johnson	labourer	South Australian October 1864	Eagle January 1867	joined McKinlay's party July 1866 later with Goyder expedition
George Kersley	staff member	South Australian October 1864	Ellen Lewis December 1865	later with Goyder expedition
Stephen King, jun.	Storekeeper and Superintendent of Stock	South Australian October 1864	(sick leave) Bengal May 1865 to Batavia; South Australian to Adelaide, arr. July 1865	later with Goyder expedition
Thomas King	labourer and able seaman	Henry Ellis April 1864	South Australian December 1864	
John G. Kirby	labourer, in charge of stock	South Australian October 1864	Eagle January 1867	E. C. [sic] Kirby, G. Warland, S. King and J. Ross, took charge of cattle at Brisbane.
R. M. Lewis	in charge of stock	Ellen Lewis May 1866	Eagle January 1867	
Fred H. Litchfield	labourer	Henry Ellis April 1864	Ellen Lewis December 1865	one of Finniss's "favorites"
John Vereker Lloyd	visitor chainman	South Australian October 1864 (privately); Bengal March 1865	Ellen Lewis December 1865	
Charles William Machell	chainman and Able Seaman	Henry Ellis April 1864	perhaps identified as "Mitchell" on Beatrice November 1864	
W. Mann	visitor	South Australian October 1864		
James Thomas Manton	Engineer and Surveyor	Henry Ellis April 1864	Eagle January 1867	In charge of rump party after Finniss's departure, and was no improvement.
Henry Martin	labourer in charge of stock	South Australian October 1864; Ellen Lewis May 1866	Ellen Lewis December 1865; Eagle January 1867 ?	
Gilbert R. McMinn	labourer	South Australian October 1864	Ellen Lewis December 1865	later with Goyder expedition
William McMinn	chainman	Henry Ellis April 1864	Forlorn Hope May 1865	
J. Stokes Millner	surgeon and Protector of Aborigines, replacing Dr Goldsmith	Ellen Lewis September 1865	Eagle January 1867	one of those remaining at Adam Bay after Ellen Lewis departure 1 December 1865 Also on Goyder expedition 1869.
William Moorshead	carpenter	Henry Ellis April 1864	Ellen Lewis December 1865	
Owen Morris			Eagle January 1867	perhaps a sailor from Ellen Lewis; joined McKinlay's party July 1866
William S. K. Murray	seaman, labourer	Henry Ellis April 1864	Ellen Lewis December 1865	
Charles Edwin Neal (Neel?)	staff	South Australian October 1864	Ellen Lewis December 1865	later with Goyder expedition
H. D. Packard	Surveyor	South Australian October 1864	Eagle January 1867	accompanied by wife Mary Packard and their four-month-old daughter (Mary made history in December 1866 by giving birth to a daughter in the Top End)
Francis James "Frank" Packard	chainman	Henry Ellis April 1864	Ellen Lewis December 1865	A brother of H. D. Packard, he drowned in the Murray before being called as witness in murder trial of W. P. Auld
William Pearson	Surveyor	Henry Ellis April 1864	Bengal May 1865	on sick leave
Charles Pennycuick	more info needed		Beatrice November 1864	dismissed by Finniss September? 1864 for "joining Ward clique"
Sgt. William Potter	police trooper	Ellen Lewis 1865	Ellen Lewis December 1865	
W. Read	chainman and Able Seaman	Henry Ellis April 1864	Bengal May 1865	later on OT, killed by crocodile
J. F. Roberts	labourer	Henry Ellis April 1864	Bengal May 1865	later with Goyder expedition, OT
James Ross	labourer, in charge of stock	South Australian October 1864	Ellen Lewis December 1865	
W. Rowland	labourer	South Australian October 1864	Eagle January 1867	
Jeremiah "Jerry" Ryan	labourer shoeing smith	South Australian October 1864	Eagle January 1867	joined McKinlay party November 1865, later with Goyder expedition
John Ryan	labourer	South Australian October 1864	Ellen Lewis December 1865	
Chris. Schmidt; Charles Schmid?	staff	South Australian October 1864	Eagle January 1867	listed as "Smidt" 1866
J. Dodson de Skelton	labourer	South Australian October 1864	South Australian December 1864	
Alfred Smith	labourer	South Australian October 1864	Ellen Lewis December 1865	
William Smith	labourer	Henry Ellis April 1864	Bengal May 1865	
Jefferson P. Stow	visitor, agent for land purchasers	South Australian October 1864	Forlorn Hope May 1865	criticised frivolous use of Beatrice
Wycliffe Stow	labourer	South Australian October 1864	Ellen Lewis December 1865	returned in poor health
Edward Strawbridge	labourer	South Australian October 1864	Ellen Lewis December 1865	
John Stuckey	visitor, agent for land purchasers	South Australian October 1864	Ellen Lewis December 1865	
Henry Thomas "Harry" Styles	labourer	Henry Ellis April 1864	South Australian December 1864	
G. Thompson	in charge of stock	Ellen Lewis May 1866	Eagle January 1867	
Alfred John Todd	labourer	South Australian October 1864	Eagle January 1867	perhaps joined mounted police 1867 Todd and his wife separated while he was stationed at Port Lincoln 1885.
Edward "Ned" Tuckwell	labourer	South Australian October 1864	Eagle January 1867	joined McKinlay party November 1865 later with Goyder expedition
John Varley	mason	South Australian October 1864	Ellen Lewis December 1865	
Frederick Wadham	labourer	South Australian October 1864	Ellen Lewis December 1865	returned in poor health, died 6 July 1878
James Wadham	Junior Surveyor	Henry Ellis April 1864	Yatala November 1864	brother to at least one other Wadham; A niece, Bertha Mary Wadham (1863–1936), was mother of Sir Howard Florey
John Wadham	carpenter	South Australian October 1864	Ellen Lewis December 1865	sick with scurvy, died 30 May 1866
W. H. Walker	labourer	South Australian October 1864	Ellen Lewis December 1865	
Alaric Ward	labourer	Henry Ellis April 1864	buried (at Escape Cliffs ?)	killed an Aboriginal man at Escape Cliffs August 1864, was himself speared and bludgeoned to death 31 July 1865 while in charge of sheep (erroneously listed on Ellen Lewis December 1865) He was not related to Ebenezer Ward.
Ebenezer Ward	Clerk in charge, Accountant, and Postmaster	Henry Ellis April 1864	South Australian December 1864	dismissed by Finniss September? 1864 for insubordination
R. J. (R. A?) Ware	labourer, cook	Henry Ellis April 1864	Bengal May 1865	ill at the same time as Pearson
George T. Warland	labourer, in charge of stock	South Australian October 1864	Ellen Lewis December 1865	
Richard Watson	Draftsman	Henry Ellis April 1864	Eagle January 1867	
John White	labourer	South Australian October 1864	Forlorn Hope May 1865	
Eddowes J. Wilson	labourer	South Australian October 1864		died of apoplexy 11 December 1864
D. B. Wiltshire	chainman and Able Seaman	Henry Ellis April 1864	Ellen Lewis December 1865	
Clement Young	Postmaster and Clerk	South Australian October 1864	Eagle January 1867	
John Young	labourer	South Australian October 1864	Eagle January 1867	joined McKinlay party November 1865 accidental death aboard Rangatira 1 February 1867

(for Legend see below following sub-section)

== McKinlay expedition 1866 ==
The Finniss expedition, which left Adelaide with high expectations had, with each depressing report from the Territory, become a drag on Government, who decided what was needed was a small exploration party, unencumbered by such mundane tasks as erecting buildings and maintaining and protecting stores, to make a clear decision as to where the fertile land was, and where the capital should be. To that end they appointed John McKinlay to lead a party of twelve, to receive all support from the Finniss party, but to go where they might. Their ship, Ellen Lewis, which arrived at Adam Bay on 5 November 1865, also carried instructions for Finniss to return to Adelaide, to answer criticisms of his administration. Five of Finniss's party transferred to McKinlay's — Surveyor R. H. Edmunds, Jeremiah Ryan, John Young, and Edward Tuckwell, bringing its numbers to 14.

McKinlay did not receive the support he expected from Finniss's successor Manton, and did not commence exploration until 20 January, when rain interfered with his travels. They never reached Cape Hawkesbury, the Roper or the Victoria. Their lowest point came in June 1866 (not the Wet Season as sometimes reported) when McKinlay, Edmunds and party, having one by one slaughtered their horses for food, were trapped in boggy land by the East Alligator River. Weak and malnourished with no chance of making it back to camp alive, they killed their two remaining horses for jerky and built a raft 21 by 9 by 4 feet (6.4 m × 2.7 m × 1.2 m) of horses' hides around a structure of green branches, and on 29 June started paddling down to the sea, and arrived back at Escape Cliffs on 5 July 1866.

After recovering from their ordeal they made several coastal expeditions, visiting Anson Bay, the Daly River and Port Darwin. He returned to Adelaide to a hero's welcome, despite having achieved nothing, though he did report having seen some good land near Anson Bay, and thought Port Darwin had many advantages, but lacked fresh water.

=== Personnel ===
Name	Job/position	Depart Adelaide	Depart Adam Bay	Notes
Robert Charles Burton		South Australian October 1864	Eagle January 1867	joined July 1866 from Manton's party later with Goyder expedition
John Cleland		Bengal March 1865	Eagle January 1867	joined 1866 from Manton's party
David Collier		Ellen Lewis September 1865	Eagle January 1867	
Thomas Bagnold Crispe		Ellen Lewis September 1865	Eagle January 1867	
John Davis	storekeeper	Ellen Lewis September 1865	Eagle January 1867	
R. H. Edmunds	surveyor and deputy leader	South Australian October 1864	Beatrice August 1866	joined from Finniss's party November 1865
Thomas Gilbanks (often Gillbanks)		Ellen Lewis September 1865	Eagle January 1867	In charge of party after departure of McKinlay
Thomas Glen	bushman	Ellen Lewis September 1865	Beatrice August 1866	Brother-in-law of McKinlay
John Horner		Ellen Lewis September 1865	Eagle January 1867	
Charles S. Hulls		Ellen Lewis September 1865	Eagle January 1867	
David Johnson (often Johnston)		South Australian October 1864	Eagle January 1867	joined 1866 from Manton's party later with Goyder expedition
George Gibson Mayo		Ellen Lewis September 1865	Beatrice August 1866	
John McKinlay	leader	Ellen Lewis September 1865	Beatrice August 1866	
Dr. J. Stokes Millner	Surgeon and Protector of Aborigines	Ellen Lewis September 1865	Eagle January 1867	with Goyder expedition
G. P. Morris		Ellen Lewis September 1865	Eagle January 1867	
Owen Morris			Eagle January 1867	joined 1866 from Manton's party perhaps a sailor from Ellen Lewis
William Potter	Police trooper	Ellen Lewis September 1865	Ellen Lewis December 1865	
Jeremiah Ryan		South Australian October 1864	Eagle January 1867	Joined from Finniss's party November 1865
Francis William Thring		Ellen Lewis September 1865	Eagle January 1867	Stuart's third officer on his two longest expeditions.
Edward "Ned" Tuckwell		South Australian October 1864	Eagle January 1867	joined from Finniss's party November 1865
Samuel Watts		Ellen Lewis September 1865	Eagle January 1867	
John Young	labourer	South Australian October 1864	Eagle January 1867	joined McKinlay party November 1865 accidental death aboard Rangatira 1 February 1867

== Legend: ship movements ==
Leaving SA

- Henry Ellis April 1864 Henry Ellis, ship, 412 tons; Capt. Phillips master, left Port Adelaide 23 April 1864, arrived Adam Bay 20 June 1864
- Government schooner Yatala, Humbert master, left Port Adelaide 18 May 1864, arrived Adam Bay 1 August? 1 July? Capt. Francis Humbert was dismissed by Finniss October 1864.
- South Australian October 1864 steamer South Australian, 435 tons, J. Pain master, left Port Adelaide 29 October 1864 arrived Adam Bay 6 December with 47 passengers, including 40 Government appointees.
- Surveying schooner Beatrice 93 tons, Hutchinson R.N., left Port Adelaide 9 April 1864 for Northern Territory. Arrived Adam Bay, waited for arrival of Henry Ellis. Returned from Koepang with supplies 1 October 1864, returned Port Adelaide 14 December 1864, her captain in poor health.

Lt. Frederick Howard R.N. succeeded Commander Hutchison as officer in charge January 1865; left Port Adelaide 18 February 1865 arrived Adam Bay 8 April 1865 with pay for men, took Auld to Port Darwin for brief exploration. explored Adelaide River May 1865, September 1865 exploring Victoria River, then to Koepang for provisions; Sourabaya for supplies December 1865; Adam Bay maybe mid-1866. (when?)

- Bengal March 1865 Bengal left Port Adelaide 3 March 1865 with 6 passengers arrived Adam Bay 21 April 1865.
- Ellen Lewis September 1865 336 tons, Stephen Hellon master. John McKinlay and party of 12 left Port Adelaide 25 September 1865, arrived Adam Bay 5 November 1865.
- Ellen Lewis May 1866 Ellen Lewis left Port Adelaide May 1866 for Adam Bay with stock and 11 passengers.

also of some interest:

- Bengal 21 May 1870, Grierson master, left Adelaide for Port Darwin with land agents and potential settlers: Mr and Mrs Tod and child, Mr and Mrs Gardiner and 3 children, W. H. Gray, S. King, D. Daly, J. Davis. McKinlay, Beetson, Holthouse, Kritzmer, Schmidt, Playford, Powell, Morris, Beetson, and Douglas.

Leaving NT

- Beatrice November 1864 Beatrice left Adam Bay 9 November 1864, arrived Port Adelaide 14 December 1864.
- Yatala November 1864 Yatala left Adam Bay 9 November 1864, sent to Timor for supplies, wrecked, condemned as rotten.
- South Australian December 1864 South Australian left Adam Bay c. 10 December 1864 with Ward, King, five others
- Bengal May 1865 Swedish barque Bengal, Peterson master, left Adam Bay 6 May 1865 for Surabaya with 13 passengers; two transshipped to Singapore; the rest by Douglas to Melbourne, thence to Adelaide.
- Forlorn Hope May 1865 seven men left Adam Bay 6 May 1865 on an open sailing boat, dubbed Forlorn Hope, purchased from skipper of Bengal
- Schooner Beatrice left Adam Bay for Adelaide
- Ellen Lewis December 1865 Ellen Lewis left Adam Bay 1 December 1865, arrived Port Adelaide 13 February 1866 with Finniss, Litchfield and 30 others.
- Beatrice August 1866 Beatrice left Adam Bay 14 August 1866, arrived Port Adelaide via Koepang 26 September; McKinlay and three or four passengers only.
- Eagle January 1867 Steamer Eagle, Captain Hill, left Adam Bay 11 January 1867, transhipped to Rangatira at Sydney; arrived Adelaide February 1867.

== Cadell expedition 1867 ==
In January 1867, realising they had no alternative site chosen for the capital, the South Australian Government instructed Captain Francis Cadell to assemble a party to investigate the coast of the Northern Territory, to choose areas suitable for agriculture, and a site for the settlement. Cadell and a few associates left for Sydney, where he engaged the wooden steamer Eagle for six months, with the option of extending for another three or six. There he also hired a crew (preferring not to employ South Australians) which would have included a number of woodcutters to feed the steamer's voracious boilers once the coal had been consumed. He had the ship refitted in Brisbane, and on 20 April the party of 26 men left for Victoria River. Cadell had an interesting nine months' expedition and made several useful findings, including the true nature of Flinders's Probable Island in Arnhem Bay. He named the strait between Elcho Island and the mainland Cadell Strait after himself and the mainland peninsula Napier Peninsula after his surveyor. He discovered the mouth of the Roper River, and the condition (untouched) of the Escape Cliffs settlement. They visited Koepang for re-provisioning. They also returned to Burketown, Queensland at least once for the same reason. He took only 20 horses, so was unable to investigate far inland, and made no strong recommendation for the site of the capital, though his choice ultimately fell on the Liverpool River, in Arnhem Land.

A. T. Saunders (1854–1940), South Australia's noted amateur historian and critic of Cadell the self-publicist and influence-peddler, had little to say on this page in his history. One contemporary newspaper editor however, held nothing back in his satire on Cadell's pomposity.

=== Personnel ===
Name	Job/position	Depart Adelaide	Joined Sydney	Returned Adelaide	Notes
Francis Cadell	Leader	Coorong February 1867		Aldinga February 1868	
John M. Creed	Surgeon		information needed		supported charges of Cadell's cruelty.
George Fraser	blacksmith		information needed		accidentally shot himself dead c. September 1867
R. Hodges		Coorong February 1867			on a previous Cadell exploration party
M. Mason		Coorong February 1867			
T. Morris		Coorong February 1867			on a previous Cadell exploration party
Francis Napier	surveyor/engineer		information needed		Died 1875 without death notice or obituary, but clearly a favorite of Cadell. Author of Voyage from NSW to the North Coast of Australia, 1867
G. Philcox		Coorong February 1867			

No information has been found on Hodges, Mason and Philcox, who have also been listed as Hodge, Massen and J Philcox and nothing on the 20-odd from Sydney and Brisbane.

Legend

Coorong February 1867 Left Port Adelaide 26 February 1867 on Coorong for Sydney, where he chartered steamer Eagle and light draught steamer firefly; picked up a surgeon and exploring party

He returned to Sydney by Eagle 21 January 1868, paid off his workers, disposed of stores, remained in Sydney while the Duke of Edinburgh was in town, then by the Aldinga to Adelaide on 13 February 1868. No mention was made of any associates, but the South Australian public was wearied of the continued waste of money on "frolics" in the Territory, and by Cadell in particular.

== Goyder expedition 1869 ==
After four years of hearing nothing but reports of lack of progress in surveying land they had paid for, land-order-holders in England and Australia (mostly speculators with no intention of ever settling in the Territory) began agitating for a refund of their money, with interest, and would not be mollified by explanations of the difficulties involved, and the expense to which the Colonial Government had been put. In March 1868 it was decided to offer a refund with interest to those who wanted out, and to those who were prepared to hang on for an extra year, a sweetener in the increase of the plot size from 160 to 240 acres (later increased to 320). Public tenders were called for the surveying of 420,000 acres, which The Advertiser cynically reckoned would result in no, or exceedingly inflated, bids and would therefore be undertaken by the Surveyor-General's department. The outcome was a little of both: George Goyder (the Surveyor-General) offered to organise and lead the expedition, and survey 420,000 acres (1,700 km^{2}) receiving his usual salary plus a bonus of £3,000 for successful completion within a year at a cost of £25,000, not counting shipping costs. Parliament leapt at the proposal, such was Goyder's reputation for integrity, energy and vision. The fact that the South Australian Government was losing no time and grudging no expenditure on a successful outcome, and putting their best man in charge of the venture, restored much confidence in the investors in Northern Territory property.

Goyder's plan was to appoint six 1st Class Surveyors of his choosing; they would appoint their own 2nd Class Surveyors and Cadets, and where possible the "arms and legs": the chainmen, trenchers, cook and stock handlers, otherwise these appointments would be made by Goyder from men he knew. He agreed with the purchase of horses and cattle from Brisbane, but rejected suggestions that any men should be picked up there; he wanted men he knew and who respected him. They would land at Port Darwin and work their way towards the fertile lands of the Upper Adelaide and Victoria Rivers. He insisted on all provisions being supplied in Adelaide to his specifications (10,000 lbs beef and mutton prepared by the Melbourne Meat Preservation Company (S. S. Ritchie's process), rather than relying on store cattle and sheep. He also ordered 20 tons of dry-ground flour, being less affected by tropical conditions than the moist-ground flour used by bakers). and personally inspected by him.

Goyder gave strict instructions to his men that for their own safety, interactions with the natives should be strictly limited: none to be allowed in the camp; strictly no touching Aboriginal women under any circumstances, the greatest source of animosity; never to go out alone, and not to leave the camp unarmed; to use firearms as a last resort and to aim at a person only when one's own life was in peril. To respect Aboriginal property, and not to engage in any form of retribution. Two men, Hardy and Greene, ignored this last injunction and smashed several of their canoes and pushed two others into the current, for no good reason, and received a dressing-down from the Surveyor-General.

The men worked hard and efficiently and the whole of the surveying job was completed by August 1869.

=== Personnel ===
Goyder's scheme of six parties effectively operated as twelve, each consisting of a first- or second-class surveyor, cadet, chainmen, headsmen, trenchers, axemen and a shared cook.

This table includes some information on those of Goyder's parties who remained or returned to the NT to participate in Charles Todd's Overland Telegraph (OT) line construction.

Name	Party	Job/position	Left Port Adelaide	Left Port Darwin	Left Adelaide for OT project	Notes
George Sydney Aldridge	2	Surveyor, Cadet, 2nd Class	Moonta December 1868	Gulnare January 1870		
James Henry Aldridge	3	chainman	Moonta December 1868	Kohinoor February 1870		OT cadet under Knuckey & C. Giles
C. Almers		carpenter	not on Moonta 1868 passenger list	Kohinoor February 1870	Omeo August 1870	OT under Knuckey and C. Giles
George A. Armstrong	6	axeman	Moonta December 1868	Gulnare September 1869		
Job Austin	5	axeman	Moonta December 1868	Kohinoor February 1870	Omeo August 1870	OT labourer under Harvey & Roberts
William Barlow		assistant photographer	Moonta December 1868	Gulnare September 1869		
Robert W. Barrow	5	headsman/axeman	Moonta December 1868	Gulnare September 1869		
George Bayfield	2	axeman	Moonta December 1868			Govt Resident's staff as teamster, OT as teamster. Friend of Deane and engaged to his sister Ny.
Robert Beard		in charge of horses	Moonta December 1868	Kohinoor February 1870		had been on Finniss's 1864 expedition
Thomas Bee	6	Surveyor, Cadet, 1st Class	Moonta December 1868	Gulnare January 1870	Omeo August 1870	Born 4 July 1850 in Brompton, England, son of T. W. Bee, educated at AEI, worked on OT under McMinn & Musgrave, later postmaster several SA towns, died 21 November 1919 in Millicent, South Australia.
David Landel Beetson (not Butson)	3	Surveyor, Cadet, 2nd Class	Moonta December 1868	Gulnare January 1870		acted as land selection agent, prospected for gold, had (with S. King and C. Schmidt) first private house in Palmerston, insolvent, died in WA.
Frederick John Bennett (not T. J. Bennett)		wellsinker	Moonta December 1868	Kohinoor February 1870		
J. W. O. Bennett		draftsman	Moonta December 1868			Bennett and William Guy speared by Aborigines 24 or 25 May 1869. Bennett died 28 May, the day after Dr Peel removed, under chloroform, broken spear point which had passed into chest cavity. Buried on Fort Hill, Darwin.
Michael Bennett		teamster	Moonta December 1868	Gulnare September 1869		
Edwin S. Berry		draftsman	Moonta December 1868	Gulnare September 1869		
Henry John Boord		police trooper	not on Moonta 1868 passenger list			Govt Resident's staff; became publican, Windmill Hotel, Nailsworth, Commercial Hotel Grenfell Street, died 27 July 1885, aged 41
Henry S. Bosworth	5	chainman	Moonta December 1868	Gulnare September 1869		
Joseph Brans		boatman/labourer	Gulnare February 1869	Kohinoor February 1870		Appointed to Govt Resident's staff
John Sherlock Brooking	4	Surveyor, Cadet, 1st Class	Moonta December 1868	Kohinoor February 1870		later in W.A.
Joseph Brooks		photographer and draftsman	Moonta December 1868	Gulnare September 1869		perhaps poundkeeper near Balaklava
Philip Henry Burden	4	Surveyor, Cadet, 2nd Class	Moonta December 1868	Gulnare September 1869		In 1875 draftsman with Surveyor-General's Dept.
Martin Burke	2	trencher	Moonta December 1868	Kohinoor February 1870		
James Burton		coxswain of Midge	Gulnare February 1869	Gulnare June 1871	Omeo December 1871	Govt. Resident's staff; later with OT under A. J. Mitchell
Robert Charles Burton		staff	Moonta December 1868	Gulnare January 1870		overseer with OT. An American, he was later with W.A. Government
Thomas Cherry	3	chainman	Moonta December 1868			labourer on Govt. Resident's staff
Robert Collard	1	headsman/axeman	Moonta December 1868			labourer on Govt. Resident's staff, then joined OT party
William Collett	5	headsman/axeman	Moonta December 1868	Gulnare September 1869	Omeo August 1870	OT laborer under Harvey & Roberts
William Cook		not known	Gulnare February 1869			appointed Port Darwin's Pilot and Harbor Master June 1892
William Henry Cornish	1	chainman	Moonta December 1868			later with Survey Department. died in 1888. His sister married AJ Mitchell who also served on this party and later worked in OT.
Walter Dalwood	4	headsman/axeman	Moonta December 1868	Moonta March 1869		sent back to Adelaide as invalid, but he was also wanted for bigamy (jailed). died July 1894
Daniel Dominick Daly (signed himself D. Daniel Daly)	6	Surveyor, 2nd Class	Moonta December 1868	Gulnare January 1870		nephew of Sir Dominick Daly
George Price Deane (Dean?)	5	trencher/axeman	Moonta December 1868	Gulnare June 1871	Omeo December 1871	stockman on Govt. Resident's staff, later with OT under A. J. Mitchell
James Divine		officers' cook	Kohinoor December 1869			Joined by wife and three children; appointed to Govt Resident's staff
David Donnolly (Donley?)		steward, chief cook and instrument repairer	Moonta December 1868			joined Gulnare as cook April 1869
James Hereford Douglas (c. 1839—1905)	5	trencher, axeman	Moonta December 1868	Gulnare January 1870; Gulnare June 1871		
F. Drought		police corporal	not on Moonta 1868 passenger list			Govt Resident's staff
Henry Edwards		chainman	Moonta December 1868	Gulnare September 1869		Returned to NT with wife and children January 1870 per Kohinoor
T. Edwards		labourer	not on Moonta 1868 passenger list			on Govt. Resident's staff
William Edwards	1	chainman				
Joseph Atkinson Ewart	3	headsman/axeman	Moonta December 1868	Kohinoor February 1870	Omeo August 1870	OT laborer under Harvey & Roberts, later resident of Roper River area, killed himself by pistol shot at Wandi, Northern Territory, on 17 May 1901.
William John Hillary Farrant	4	trencher/axeman	Moonta December 1868	Kohinoor February 1870	Omeo August 1870	OT laborer under Woods & Jarvis
William Fisher	6	chainman	Moonta December 1868	Gulnare September 1869	Omeo August 1870	OT wireman under Knuckey & C. Giles
Michael Edward Fitch		boatman	not on Moonta 1868 passenger list	Kohinoor February 1870	Omeo August 1870	OT laborer under McMinn & Musgrave
Paul Foelsche		Inspector of Police	Kohinoor December 1869			NT Government appointment
Michael Francis	1	headsman/axeman	Moonta December 1868	Gulnare September 1869	Omeo August 1870	OT cook under Knuckey & C. Giles
T. Fraser (Donald Fraser?)	5	axeman	Moonta December 1868	Kohinoor February 1870		
Charles Fry		teamster	Moonta December 1868			Appointed to Govt Resident's staff; joined by wife and three children per Kohinoor January 1870. Died in Gothenburg disaster
Adam Geare (Gaire?)	3	cook	Moonta December 1868			
R. Gellately		cook	Kohinoor December 1869	Gulnare June 1871		Govt Resident's staff, replacement for Paul Hoppo, who missed the 1868 boat.
William John Gepp also J. W. Gepp		veterinary surgeon, farrier and blacksmith	Moonta December 1868	Gulnare September 1869		had own business 1893
John Gerrald	6	axeman	Moonta December 1868	Gulnare September 1869	Omeo August 1870	Gerrald was OT labourer under Woods & Jarvis
Christopher Giles, jun.	2	Surveyor, Cadet, 1st Class	Moonta December 1868	Gulnare September 1869; Gulnare January 1870	Omeo August 1870	OT leader under Knuckey
G. W. Goyder		Surveyor-General	Moonta December 1868	Gulnare September 1869		
Charles Newton Green (Greene?, Greeve?)	1	Surveyor, Cadet, 1st Class	Moonta December 1868	Gulnare January 1870		
William Gunn	3	chainman/trencher	Moonta December 1868	Kohinoor February 1870		
William Guy	1	chainman/axeman	Moonta December 1868	Gulnare September 1869		speared in buttock by Aborigines at Fred's Pass May 1869 in same attack that killed Bennett. Guy, treated by Dr Peel, recovered.
Dennis Haire (Heir?)		trencher/axeman	Moonta December 1868	Kohinoor February 1870		
William M. Hardy		draftsman	Moonta December 1868	Gulnare January 1870		
William Harvey	5	Surveyor, 1st Class	Moonta December 1868	Gulnare January 1870	Omeo August 1870	OT Inspector w/ Roberts
H. Hatch (Henry Hatch?)			not on Moonta 1868 passenger list	Kohinoor February 1870		on Bengal August 1871 for OT
A. Hayball (Robert Hayball?)		teamster	Moonta December 1868			Appointed to Govt Resident's staff as a labourer. Joined by wife and children January 1870 per Kohinoor
William Brelsford Hayers (Hayes?)		gardener	Moonta December 1868			on Govt. Resident's staff. Died 18 June 1878 at Palmerston two months after being acquitted of attempting to shoot at a native.
Richard Hazard	2	cook	Moonta December 1868			Hazard, a "coloured" man aged 42, died (of pneumonia?) at Fort Point 9 August 1869, buried alongside Bennett
Patrick Healey	6	trencher	Moonta December 1868	Kohinoor February 1870		
Henry Henning (Hemming?)		staff	Moonta December 1868			worked with Goyder before, later prospector.
Alex. Hicks		staff	Moonta December 1868			
Richard Hinton	4	trencher/axeman	Moonta December 1868	Kohinoor February 1870		
W. W. Hoare		surgeon's assistant	Moonta December 1868	Kohinoor February 1870		Watercolour illustrations of Schultze's specimens. Returned to England
William Hodge		labourer	Kohinoor December 1870			Govt Resident's staff
William George Holland		staff	Moonta December 1868			
Wilhelm Ludwig Homeyer		staff	Moonta December 1868	Kohinoor February 1870		A friend of Richard Schomburgk, he advocated cultivation of wattles
Francis Wighton Hood		staff	Moonta December 1868			Appointed NT Government Accountant, Postmaster, Storekeeper
Paul Hoppa (Hoppo?)		cook		Gulnare June 1871		replaced by R. Gallattly (spelling?)
Richard Austin Horn	1	chainman/axeman	Moonta December 1868	Gulnare September 1869		Station manager, suicide 1891. Brother of William Austin Horn.
Thomas Sutherland Horn	2	trencher	Moonta December 1868	Gulnare September 1869		died UK 1914 Brother of William Austin Horn.
Matthew Houston	2	chainman	Moonta December 1868	Kohinoor February 1870		
William Houston (not R. Houston)	2	headsman/axeman	Moonta December 1868	Kohinoor February 1870	Omeo August 1870	OT labourer under Knuckey & C. Giles
W. Howe, sen.			not on Moonta 1868 passenger list	Gulnare September 1869		
George R. Hughes	3	headsman/axeman	Moonta December 1868	Kohinoor February 1870	Omeo August 1870	OT labourer under Knuckey & C. Giles
Henry H. Irwin	6	trencher/axeman	Moonta December 1868	Gulnare January 1870		
David Johnson (Johnston?)	2	headsman/axeman	Moonta December 1868	Gulnare January 1870	Omeo August 1870	OT laborer under McMinn & Musgrave
Renney Kappler		police trooper	not on Moonta 1868 passenger list			Govt Resident's staff
Michael Keeley (Keiley)	2	headsman/axeman	Moonta December 1868	Kohinoor February 1870		
J. George Kelley (Kelly?)		cook, ship's carpenter	Kohinoor December 1869			Govt Resident's staff
Pat. Kelley (Kelly?)	1	trencher/axeman	Moonta December 1868	Kohinoor February 1870	Omeo August 1870	OT labourer under Knuckey & C. Giles
Alexander "Alick" Kennedy		staff	Moonta December 1868	Moonta March 1869		Sacked by Goyder for deserting his post and disobeying orders
George Kersley	5	headsman/axeman	Moonta December 1868	Gulnare September 1869	Omeo August 1870	OT cook under Woods & Jarvis
Stephen King, jun.	5	Surveyor, 2nd Class	Moonta December 1868	Kohinoor February 1870; Gulnare June 1871		
R. R. Knuckey	1	Surveyor, 2nd Class	Moonta December 1868	Gulnare September 1869	Omeo August 1870	OT inspector w/ C. Giles
Heinrich or Henry Ralfs Krüss (not Kruse)	4	headsman/axeman	Moonta December 1868	Kohinoor February 1870	Omeo August 1870	OT labourer under McMinn & Musgrave
Peter Krüse (Krüss?)		teamster	Moonta December 1868			died in NT January 1874 while member of a prospecting party
James Martin Lambell		accountant and Postmaster	Moonta December 1868	Kohinoor February 1870	Omeo December 1871	OT under A. J. Mitchell
Charles Laycock	4	teamster/trencher	Moonta December 1868	Gulnare September 1869	Omeo August 1870	OT cook under Knuckey & C. Giles
Arthur Frederick Lines (1845–1914)	5	chainman	Moonta December 1868	Kohinoor February 1870		A. H. Smith married his sister. daughter of Oscar J. Lines.
Charles Lines	3	chainman/axeman	Moonta December 1868	Kohinoor February 1870		not clearly related to A. F. Lines
John London (Loudon?)	6	chainman/axeman	Moonta December 1868	Gulnare September 1869		not on Moonta 1868 passenger list
Richard John Loveday, jun	3	headsman/axeman	Moonta December 1868	Gulnare September 1869		
Thomas Loveday	3	trencher	Moonta December 1868	Kohinoor February 1870		
Cornelius Lowther	4	trencher/axeman	Moonta December 1868	Kohinoor February 1870		boatman/labourer on Govt. Resident's staff
John Lowther	3	teamster/trencher	Moonta December 1868	Kohinoor February 1870	Omeo August 1870	boatman/labourer on Govt. Resident's staff, OT under Knuckey & C. Giles
Patrick Molloy		teamster	Moonta December 1868	Kohinoor February 1870		OT teamster under Woods & Jarvis
J. Massey		police trooper				Govt Resident's staff
Donald McAuley		wellsinker	Moonta December 1868	Kohinoor February 1870		
Hugh Campbell McCallum (MacCallum?)		storekeeper				acted as secretary to Goyder, who suffered rheumatism. Appointed to Govt. Resident's staff
Terence McIntyre		wellsinker	Moonta December 1868	Gulnare January 1870		
Alexander L. McKay	5	Surveyor, Cadet, 1st Class	Moonta December 1868	Gulnare January 1870		Died in Gothenburg disaster
Alexander McKenzie	5	cook	Moonta December 1868	Gulnare January 1870	Omeo August 1870	OT under Beckwith & Wills
George Galbraith McLachlan	6	Surveyor, 1st Class	Moonta December 1868			Appointed to Govt Resident's staff. Died of lung disease 19 March 1873, at Port Darwin
Gilbert Rotherdale McMinn	4	Surveyor, 1st Class	Moonta December 1868	Gulnare September 1869; Gulnare June 1871		OT inspector with C. Musgrave
James McPherson	4	chainman/axeman	Moonta December 1868	Kohinoor February 1870		
Archibald Edmond Millar			Gulnare February 1869	Gulnare September 1869		married Sarah 1869
Charles A. Miller (Millar?)			Gulnare February 1869	Kohinoor February 1870		
James A. Miller		boatman?	Gulnare February 1869			boatman/labourer on Govt. Resident's staff
J. Stokes Millner		surgeon, Protector of Aborigines	Kohinoor December 1869			Appointed to Govt Resident's staff, whole family died in Gothenburg disaster
W(illiam) Whitfield Mills	3	Surveyor, 2nd Class	Moonta December 1868	Gulnare January 1870		on Elder Scientific Exploring Expedition, 1891–1892, prospector in W.A.
Alex James Mitchell	1	Surveyor, 1st Class	Moonta December 1868	Gulnare September 1869	Omeo December 1871	later with OT. Described by Edwin Smith as brilliant but erratic, he had four or five children by Annie Sloper Cornish, whose brother William Henry Cornish served as a chainman then in 1877 eloped bigamously to America.
Martin Moyse		wellsinker	Moonta December 1868	Kohinoor February 1870		
W(illiam) Charles Musgrave	6	trencher/chainman	Moonta December 1868	Gulnare September 1869	Omeo August 1870	OT sub-inspector under McMinn; died in Gothenburg disaster 1875
Charles Edwin Neal		stockman	Kohinoor December 1869	Gulnare June 1871?		Govt Resident's staff appointment?
Thomas Neate (Neale?)	1	chainman/axeman/mason	Moonta December 1868		Omeo December 1871	Govt Resident's staff, later with OT under A. J. Mitchell
John G. Nottage		store assistant	Moonta December 1868	Kohinoor February 1870		
James Oborn		teamster	Moonta December 1868	Kohinoor February 1870		
Harrison Daniel Packard	3	Surveyor, Cadet, 1st Class	Moonta December 1868			Appointed surveyor on Govt Resident's staff. Mrs Packard and children arrived by Kohinoor January 1870.
John Harrison Packard	4	chainman	Moonta December 1868	Kohinoor February 1870		brother of H. D. Packard, became prominent surveyor
Charles J. Palmer		teamster	Moonta December 1868	Gulnare January 1870	Omeo August 1870	OT teamster under Woods & Jarvis, died on the OT.
Dr. Robert Peel		surgeon	Moonta December 1868	Kohinoor February 1870		
John Penrose		blacksmith	Kohinoor December 1869			Govt Resident's staff appointment
William "Billy" Plaisted		chainman	Moonta December 1868	Kohinoor February 1870		mason/labourer in Govt Resident's staff
Robert Price		teamster	Moonta December 1868			
George Richards	3	headsman/axeman	Moonta December 1868	Gulnare September 1869		
Alexander "Paddy" Ringwood		draftsman	Moonta December 1868			Govt Resident's staff, worked on OT, later meteorologist under C. Todd
Edward Cecil Rix		doctor's assistant	Kohinoor December 1869	Gulnare June 1871		Govt Resident's staff; medical officer to OT
J. F. Roberts (John Le Maistre Francis Roberts)	5	Surveyor, Cadet, 2nd Class	Moonta December 1868	Kohinoor February 1870	Omeo August 1870	OT sub-inspector under Harvey
Jas. Robinson	4	headsman/axeman	Moonta December 1868	Kohinoor February 1870	Omeo August 1870	OT labourer under McMinn & Musgrave
William Rowe, jun.		staff	Moonta December 1868	Kohinoor February 1870	Omeo August 1870	OT saddler under Knuckey & C. Giles
William Rowe, sen.		in charge of horses	Moonta December 1868	Gulnare September 1869		
Edward J. Ryan	6	headsman/axeman	Moonta December 1868			labourer on Govt. Resident's staff
Jeremiah "Jerry" Ryan	1	axeman	Moonta December 1868	Kohinoor February 1870		(at one stage also claimed by team 2) then stockman on Govt. Resident's staff
Michael C. Ryan	6	headsman/axeman	Moonta December 1868	Kohinoor February 1870		
Walter Louis Samson		Staff	Moonta December 1868	Gulnare January 1870		
T. Sayers (Sayer?)		blacksmith	Moonta December 1868	Kohinoor February 1870		
Alfred Schultze		assistant botanist	Moonta December 1868			son of Frederick
Frederick Schultze		botanist	Moonta December 1868			Stayed on by request of Government Resident.
Andrew Smith			Gulnare February 1869			
Arthur Henry Smith	3	Surveyor, 1st Class	Moonta December 1868	Gulnare September 1869		brother-in-law of Goyder; made bathetic suicide attempt in 1868, died 24 September 1909 in Perth, WA.
Edwin Mitchell Smith	4	Surveyor, 2nd Class	Moonta December 1868	Gulnare September 1869		
H. Q. Smith		police trooper	not on Moonta 1868 passenger list			Govt Resident's staff
John W. Smith	5	headsman/axeman	Moonta December 1868	Kohinoor February 1870	Omeo August 1870	OT laborer under Harvey & Roberts
North Smith			not on Moonta 1868 passenger list	Kohinoor February 1870		
Charles Spenceley (Spencely?)	1	cook	Moonta December 1868	Gulnare September 1869		appointed to Govt Resident's staff but returned with wife and children per Kohinoor 1870
N. Spooner (William Spooner?)		Goyder's boatman	Gulnare February 1869	Kohinoor February 1870		
Charles William Lecky Sprigg	1	Surveyor, Cadet, 2nd Class	Moonta December 1868	Gulnare January 1870		with public service when he died 1875
William Stansborough (Stansborough?)	2	chainman	Moonta December 1868	Kohinoor February 1870	Omeo August 1870	OT labourer under Woods & Jarvis
Thomas Stevens	6	cook/steward,	Moonta December 1868	Kohinoor February 1870		
Robert Rowland Stevenson	6	trencher/axeman	Moonta December 1868	Kohinoor February 1870		
William George Stretton		police trooper	not on Moonta 1868 passenger list			Govt Resident's staff, career public servant
Joseph Middlemore Thomas	2	Surveyor, 2nd Class	Moonta December 1868	Gulnare September 1869		with Lands Titles Office until retirement 1904
Edward "Ned" Tuckwell		mechanic	Moonta December 1868			Appointed to Govt Resident's staff. Joined by wife and four children per Kohinoor January 1870
(Samuel) Grosvenor Walters	1	axeman	Moonta December 1868	Kohinoor February 1870	Omeo December 1871	OT under A. J. Mitchell
Alfred Warren	2	trencher	Moonta December 1868	Kohinoor February 1870	Omeo August 1870	OT head teamster under Knuckey & C. Giles
Benjamin Wells		assistant carpenter				Govt Resident's staff, not found on any passenger list
Charles Frederick Wells	6	Surveyor, Cadet, 2nd Class	Moonta December 1868		Omeo December 1871	Govt Resident's staff, later with OT under A. J. Mitchell
R. Wells		carpenter	Moonta December 1868			
David Wilson		teamster	Moonta December 1868	Kohinoor February 1870		
Frederick M. Wilson	4	chainman/axeman	Moonta December 1868	Kohinoor February 1870		
Alfred Thomas Woods	2	Surveyor, 1st Class	Moonta December 1868	Gulnare September 1869	Omeo August 1870	OT inspector w/ Jarvis

Legend

Leaving SA

- Moonta December 1868 Ship Moonta, 627 tons, T. Barneson, departed Port Adelaide 23 December 1868, but was held up three days at North Arm before getting underway, arrived Port Darwin 5 February 1869 with Goyder and party of over 100.
- Schooner Sea Ripple 126 tons, T. Bicknell, intended as a link between Darwin and Koepang, and for exploration purposes, should have left Adelaide with building materials in January 1869 but was condemned as unsuited to the region. Gulnare was purchased in her place. Of course Goyder and party had no knowledge of these delays and feared the worst.
- Gulnare February 1869 Schooner Gulnare, 150 tons, Capt. Samuel W. Sweet (also a noted photographer), left Adelaide 12 February 1869 arrived Port Darwin 27 March 1869 with a dozen or so additional staff.
- Gulnare left Adelaide 23 June 1869 for Koepang and Port Darwin, arrived 23 August 1869. No passengers, though with the sudden revival of interest in the Territory, many put their names forward.
- Kohinoor December 1869 Barque Kohinoor, 280 tons, Capt. Bicknell, left Adelaide 16 December 1869 with settlers, arrived Port Darwin 21 January 1870
- Omeo August 1870 Steamer Omeo chartered by Darwent & Dalwood officers S. King, W. McMinn, Burton, E M Bagot had contract for distributing provisions from depot at Mount Margaret, Harvey Bacon had a store 200 miles to north.. 5 gangs (from north) Harvey, A T Woods, Beckwith, McMinn, Knuckey; each 120 miles of line.
- Omeo December 1871 Steamer Omeo chartered by Charles Todd.

Leaving NT

- Moonta March 1869 Moonta left Port Darwin 4 March, arrived Port Wallaroo 23 April with curios and botanical samples, poss. passengers: Dalwood, Kennedy.
- Gulnare left 30 April 1869 for Koepang and Adelaide, arriving 7 June 1869.
- Gulnare September 1869 Gulnare left Port Darwin 28 September 1869 arrived Adelaide 15 November 1869. Donley part of crew, may have left ship at Port Adelaide.
- Gulnare January 1870 Gulnare, Capt. Sweet, left Port Darwin 21 January 1870 arrived Port Adelaide 27 March 1870 with 12 officers and 7 men.
- Kohinoor February 1870 Kohinoor, Thomas Bicknell, left Port Darwin 6 February 1870 arrived Port Adelaide 10 April 1870.
- Gulnare June 1871 Gulnare, Capt. Sweet, left Port Darwin 6 June 1871, arrived Port Adelaide 8 July 1871.

== 1868 article about Daly's administration ==
From an article entitled "The Administration of Sir Dominick Daly, K.B." in the Adelaide Register, dated 28 February 1868:

SETTLEMENT

From the close of Stuart's first overland journey in 1859 little doubt seems to have been entertained by his fellow-colonists as to his ultimate success. So enthusiastic was our then Governor, Sir Richard MacDonnell, about the capabilities of the newly-discovered country that he applied to the Colonial Office for its immediate annexation to South Australia. The Duke of Newcastle replied that it was too soon to speak of that until the practicability of the overland route had been demonstrated. During the next few years additional evidence was discovered, not only by Stuart himself, but by Burke and Wills, McKinlay, Landsborough, and other contemporary explorers. The Duke of Newcastle was applied to a second time, not in the interests of South Australia, however, but of Queensland. Ignoring altogether the large share of credit due to South Australian explorers, and the prior claim of the South Australian Government, he offered the whole of the north coast to Queensland, the then pet colony of Downing-street. She had the modesty to confess that one-half of the white elephant would be enough for her, and so a line was drawn at the west side of the Gulf of Carpentaria. South Australia repeated her request for Arnheim's Land, unfortunately with success. The Waterhouse Ministry, before they retired from office in July, 1863, had the satisfaction of hearing from the Duke of Newcastle that their resolutions passed in Executive Council on the undesirability of annexing the whole of Northern Australia to Queensland had carried conviction to his mind. All that portion between the 129th and 138th degrees of east longitude was to be handed over to the "temporary guardianship" of South Australia. So ended the prologue to our Northern Territory melodrama. The first act must needs open with a Ministerial crisis, and in the transformation scene those who had opposed annexation became its executive, while some of its official originators enrolled themselves in the opposition. Among the founders of the Adam Bay settlement were a Chief Secretary (Mr. Ayers), a Treasurer (Captain Hart), and a Commissioner of Crown Lands (Mr. Glyde), who on the shady side of the House had spoken against annexation as a very equivocal benefit. They had deprecated the ambition of the Waterhouse Government in proposing to send stock overland, and within twelve months they shipped from Port Adelaide a full-blown colony, with Government Resident, Secretary, guard of honour and valet-de-chambre for His Excellency, Police and Police Inspectors, Surveyors and Surveyor Generals, labourers and gentlemen farmers — altogether a perfect specimen of a ready-made municipality. But hothouse colonization did not suit the climate of Adelaide River. Disgusted with two years' experience of it, we tried a little exploring again, and Mr. McKinlay spent a pleasant winter on the East Alligator River at the expense of the Northern Territory Fund. To complete the programme of dilettante colonization our only further requirement was a marine survey à la Marco Polo, which Captain Cadell has given us. Now we can turn round and conscientiously say to the land-order-holders — the would-be cotton-planters and paddy-cultivators of Adam Bay — that we have done our best for them in that particular direction. Had the Duke of Newcastle been alive, with what gusto might the land-order-holders have poured their grievances into his sympathetic ear; what invidious comparisons might they not have drawn between the Queensland style of settlement and our own ! There on one side of the boundary is Escape Cliffs, with its abandoned stores hid away under tarpaulins, and "the old Chief Mira" as special constable keeping guard over them. On the other side is Burke Town, a flourishing depot for the squatting stations on the Plains of Promise. From Queensland stock has been allowed to eat its way gradually down the Flinders, the Cloncurry, and the Albert Rivers. It has not only cost nothing to the Brisbane Government, but has been a large source of profit to the country. From South Australia not a single head of cattle has entered Arnheim's Land, unless by sea, and after eating its head off half a dozen times over on the voyage, seventy thousand pounds spent on a four years' infatuation, and the net result is— two hundred pounds worth of marine stores left on Escape Cliffs as a souvenir of the Finniss regime ! If history could be expunged as easily as Parliamentary votes, the words "Northern Territory" would never more be seen in our annals.
