= Alexander James Mitchell =

Surveyor and mining engineer (1846–1926)

Alexander James Mitchell (October 1846 – 1926) was a British born surveyor, mining engineer and businessman who played a critical role in the development of Darwin and the completion of the Australian Overland Telegraph Line in 1872.

== Personal life and controversy ==
Alexander James Mitchell (also known as A. J. Mitchell) was born in Wiltshire, England in October 1846, and was baptised in December of that year. His parents were Alexander Mitchell and Emma Maslen. His father was linen draper who died the same year he was born. His mother remarried and emigrated to Adelaide, Australia with her new husband when Alex was a teenager.

In January 1867, Mitchell married Anne Sloper Cornish. Together they had five children - three daughters and two sons. Mitchell appears to have left Anne in 1877, and in 1891 Anne married Darwin-based merchant Edwin Luxton (though she did not relocate from Adelaide). Anne died in 1940.

On 1 August 1877, Mitchell married Christina Cameron. In October 1877, accounts appeared in the newspapers that Mitchell had deserted his first wife, Anne, and eloped with Christina. He was charged with bigamy by the NSW Police and was described as "31 years of age, 5 feet 10 inches high, slender build, fair complexion, brown hair, brown beard, whiskers, and a moustache tinged with red, blue eyes, one front tooth artificial; an Englishman; a surveyor." One newspaper account suggests that Mitchell and Cameron had fled Australia for the United States.

Christina later gave birth to a daughter, Camille May Josephine Mitchell (1878–1961), who would go on to have a successful career as a singer. In 1877, Christina married Charles Thomas Richards, and moved to Queensland after Richard's death. She died there in 1945.

It is unclear whether both Christina and Mitchell did in fact go to the United States, but Mitchell appears to be working mining claims in 1878 in Arizona. In 1882, he is listed on the Voter Registration roll in Tombstone, Arizona, where he was working as a surveyor. According to other government documents, including the US census records, Mitchell emigrated to the US in the 1880s.

In March 1882, Mitchell married his third wife, Charlotte Jane Whiteman, daughter of a local Judge, in Albuquerque, New Mexico. The 1900 US census records that Mitchell and his wife are living in Colorado. He give his date of birth as 1856, shaving a decade off his actual age. He and Charlotte later moved to Los Angeles, and by 1910 had two servants - a Japanese cooked named Shigitashi Suzuki and a Louisiana-born housemaid, Harriet S. Johnson.

Mitchell was an active member of the local sailing community and owned several racing yachts.

== Career ==
Mitchell was working as a surveyor in South Australia in the late 1860s. It is unclear where he trained.

=== Role in the Northern Australian surveying parties ===
In 1868, Mitchell joined George Woodroffe Goyder surveying part of Port Darwin and Palmerston. Goyder, who was the Surveyor General for South Australia, had hired six other senior surveyors - including Mitchell - to run small independent work groups. These groups included a cadet, a chainman, and a cook, among others. Mitchell was in charge of Party No. 1 and his team included his brother-in-law, William Henry Cornish (1849–1888). In February 1869, Mitchell submitted a report on land near Palmerston.

Mitchell is credited with surveying more than 970 acres, which amounted to almost a quarter of all the land surveyed by Goyder's Northern Territory expedition. In acknowledgement of his contributions, the suburb Mitchell is named after him.

=== Role in the Overland Telegraph Line ===
From 1870 to 1872, the colony of South Australia, under the instruction of Charles Todd, built a cross-continental telegraph line, knowns as the Overland Telegraph Line (OTL). Stretching from Adelaide in the far south to the newly established town of Port Darwin in the far north, it was the longest such system to be built anywhere in the world.

R. C. Patterson, who was in charge of completing the final section of the OTL, recruited Mitchell as an overseer and surveyor. Mitchell reflected on his work on the OTL in a letter to the editor in December 1872, where he describes himself as the Chief Officer of the Central Section of the Line.

Mitchell also appears in one of the iconic Samuel Sweet photographs from the OTL. Alongside Charles Todd, J. A. G. Little, and Patterson, he is photographed leaning against a supply wagon in a work camp just near Frew Ponds where the line was connected in August 1872.

In January 1874, Mitchell was appointed as a surveyor First Class in the Colony of South Australia. In February 1876, he was appointed a licensed surveyor in New South Wales and began to advertise his services in the local newspapers. He was given a bonus in 1873 of £100/ while working on the central section of the line.

=== A new career in America ===
In the late 1870s, Mitchell moved to the United States and secured work, first as a surveyor, then as a mining engineer in Colorado and Arizona. He is recorded as having mining claims in Arizona in 1878 and 1879, and was involved in creating topological maps of Tombstone, Arizona.

From 1893 to 1895, Mitchell was involved in the establishment of the town of Marble in Colorado. In the 1900s, he was involved in businesses importing Yule Marble in Los Angeles. Records related to his mine holdings are in the Yale University archives.

== Death ==
Mitchell died in Los Angeles in 1926. His obituary makes reference to his role in the development of Australia's Overland Telegraph Line. He is buried, alongside Charlotte, in the Angelus-Rosedale Cemetery.
