= Hibbertia goyderi =

Scientific classification
- Kingdom: Plantae
- Clade: Tracheophytes
- Clade: Angiosperms
- Clade: Eudicots
- Order: Dilleniales
- Family: Dilleniaceae
- Genus: Hibbertia
- Species: H. goyderi

Binomial name
- Hibbertia goyderi F.Muell.

Species of flowering plant

Hibbertia goyderi is a species of flowering plant in the family Dilleniaceae and is endemic to the Northern Territory. It is a small leafless shrub with angular stems and yellow flowers with about nine or ten stamens arranged around the two carpels.

== Description ==
Hibbertia goyderi is a shrub that typically grows to a height of 50 cm (20 in) with erect stems that are angular or triangular in cross-section. The leaves are reduced to bracts 1–1.5 mm (0.039–0.059 in) long and 0.3 mm (0.012 in) wide. The flowers are borne on a peduncle 10–35 mm (0.39–1.38 in) long with small bracts at the base. The five sepals are joined at the base, the outer sepals lance-shaped and 4–6 mm (0.16–0.24 in) long, the inner sepals egg-shaped and slightly shorter. The five petals are yellow, spatula-shaped, 6–10 mm (0.24–0.39 in) long and 2–3 mm (0.079–0.118 in) wide. There are about nine or ten stamens arranged around the two carpels. Flowering occurs from August to March.

== Taxonomy ==
Hibbertia goyderi was first formally described in 1871 by Ferdinand von Mueller in Fragmenta phytographiae Australiae from specimens collected by "Schultz" near Port Darwin. The specific epithet (goyderi) honours George Goyder.

== Distribution and habitat ==
This hibbertia grows in woodland near Darwin in the far north-east of the Northern Territory.

== See also ==
- List of Hibbertia species
