= Surveyor General of South Australia =

South Australian civil servant

The Surveyor General of South Australia (also stylised Surveyor-General) is a position originally created for the Surveyor General for the colony of South Australia. The post is held by an official responsible for government surveying.

== List of Surveyors General of South Australia ==
Surveyor General	Period in office	Notes
William Light	1836 – July 1838	Chose the site of Adelaide
George Ormsby	July 1838 – March 1839	Acting, after Light's resignation
Charles Sturt	March – October 1839	Famous as an explorer
Edward Charles Frome	October 1839 – February 1849	British Army officer, retired as a general
Arthur Henry Freeling	1849–1861	Gave his name to Freeling, South Australia
George Woodroffe Goyder	1861–1894	Mapped Goyder's Line
William Strawbridge	1894–1911	
Edwin Mitchell Smith	1911–1917	
Norman William Pethick	1917–1921	
Theodore Ernest Day	1921–1930	
James Henry McNamara	1930–1937	
Clive Melville Hambidge	1937–1950	
Arthur Dickerson Smith	1950–1951	
Harold Leslie Fisk	1951–1959	
Alexander Hubert Hawdon Davison	1959–1961	
Harry Alexander Bailey	1961–1969	
George Harry Campbell Kennedy	1969–1978	(sometimes written Campbell–Kennedy)
Bryan Howard Bridges	1978–1987	
John Reginald Porter	1987–1992	
Christopher William Lunnay	1992–1993	acting
Peter Maclaren Kentish	1993–2012	
Michael Paul Burdett	2012–2022	
Bradley James Slape	2022–present	
