= Edwin S. Berry =

Australian surveyor & explorer (1845-1934)

Edwin Stow Berry (12 June 1845 – 1 June 1934) was a surveyor and explorer, who took a leading part in two important expeditions to the Northern Territory of Australia.

== History ==
Berry was born in Glenelg, South Australia to William Berry and Hannah Berry, née Watts, of Ringmer, Sussex, who arrived in South Australia in September 1839 on the Branken Moor from London. They lived for a while at Glenelg, then Grenfell Street, Adelaide, then built the family home "Ringmer" in Burnside, later the home of cricketer W. O. Whitridge.

Berry was educated at J. L. Young's Adelaide Educational Institution, which supplied a solid grounding to many boys in useful sciences, mathematics and languages. In 1865 he was taken on by the Government's Survey Department, and in the same year he joined George Goyder's surveying team. He was a head of the survey team attached to Goyder's 1869 expedition to the Northern Territory that laid out the plan for the town of Port Darwin, lithographed by F. S. Crawford in 1869. The other surveyors were J. W. O. Bennett, Alexander Ringwood and William M. Hardy.

He was chosen as second-in-charge for Major Warburton's expedition which was to have left Adelaide in early September 1872 for Central Mount Stuart, and thence to Perth. That expedition was delayed almost a month and Berry was dropped from the party, and instead assigned to William Gosse as second-in-charge of his 1873 expedition to Central Australia, and whose other members were Henry Gosse (William's brother, died 1888 in Darwin), Henry Winnall and Patrick Nilan, three Afghans (Note: In the terminology of the time, "Afghan" referred to people from the region, not necessarily the modern Afghanistan.) and "Moses", an Aborigine from The Peake. William Darton Kekwick, originally appointed the party's mineral and botanical collector, was too ill to proceed and died 16 October 1872 on his return to Adelaide. Among their discoveries was an inselberg which Gosse named "Ayer's Rock". The party reached a point 600 miles (970 km) west of the Transcontinental Telegraph Line and were forced to return due to lack of available water.

Berry has been named as the first white man to climb Uluru/Ayers Rock, though in his diary, Gosse claims, with an Afghan assistant, Kamran, that distinction.

He was later chief draughtsman of the Land Titles Office.

He died in Roseville, New South Wales at the home of his daughter.

== Recognition ==
- Berry Creek, and hence Berry Springs (a popular tourist drawcard south of Darwin) was named for him by Goyder.
- Berry's Pass, 5 miles (8.0 km) from Mount Liebig towards Mount Palmer, was named for him by Gosse.

== Family ==
He married Adelaide Mary Forbes Laurie on 11 July 1874. Their children included:

- Hannah Maud Berry (1877–1957) married Charles Albert Scales on 26 September 1900, lived at Medindie.
- Adelaide Ruth Berry (1881– ) married Herbert Congdon Caust in 1893, lived in New South Wales.
- Francis Forbes Berry (27 January 1884 – 6 August 1916) was engaged to Marguerita Stapleton Kingsborough (1890–1964) in November 1910, but killed in action at Pozieres during WWI.
- Hilda Faith Berry (1885– ) married Spencer Robinson in 1908, lived in Roseville, New South Wales.
- Hester Lilias Berry (1890– ) married Patrick Cockburn MB., BS. on 14 June 1916, lived at Newcastle, New South Wales.
