= R. H. Edmunds =

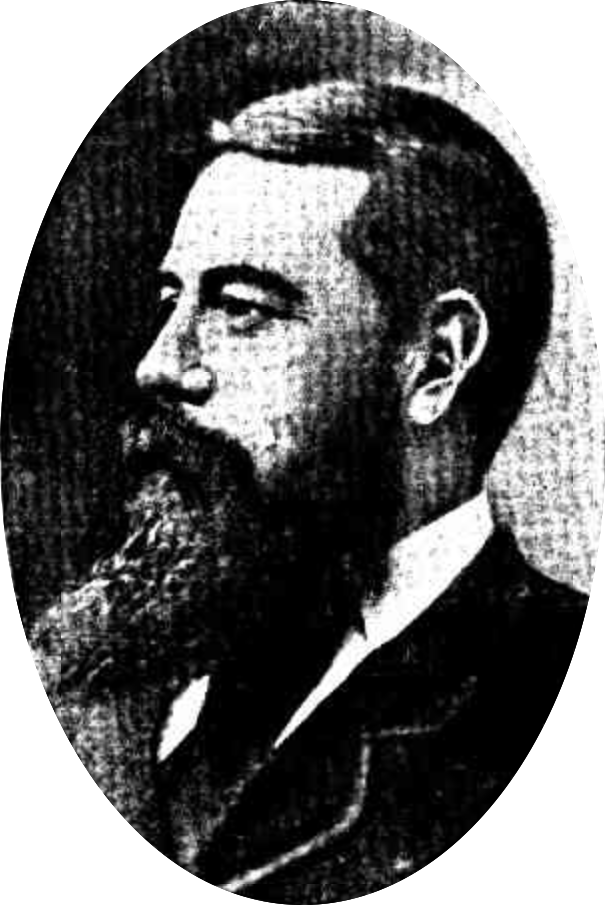
R. H. Edmunds, 1896

Robert Henry Edmunds, ISO (12 April 1834 – 12 February 1917) was a surveyor, explorer and public servant in the early days of the colony of South Australia. He was involved in surveys and explorations in the Northern Territory with Finniss's party at Escape Cliffs and with the McKinlay exploration of the Alligator Rivers region.

== History ==
Edmunds was born in Great Marlborough street, London, eldest son of Daniel Edmunds and his wife Mary, and was educated at Caversham, Oxfordshire. His parents and their family of four arrived in South Australia aboard Calphurnia in April 1849. He worked as a sailor for a few years, then on 15 April 1855 joined the South Australian Government as a surveyor, then on 1 January 1858, was appointed to the list of first-class officers. In 1863, he transferred to the Customs Department, and was appointed sub-collector of customs at Wallaroo, but before he could take up the post he accepted a position as senior surveyor with B. T. Finniss's party which was making preparations for a settlement to be called Palmerston at Escape Cliffs on Adam Bay in the Northern Territory. Of the original 80 staff recruited some 20 had died, resigned, or otherwise removed from the service and had to be replaced.

Edmunds was put in command of this "relief" party of 40 including two other officers, H. Packard and C. Young, which left Port Adelaide on the new steamer South Australian on 29 October 1864, and arrived at Escape Cliffs on 5 December 1864. While in the Territory Edmunds was attached to John McKinlay as surveyor and second in command of his party whose brief was, independently of Finniss, to explore the north between Victoria River and the Gulf of Carpentaria with a view to finding other, perhaps better, settlement sites. It was gruelling work under dangerous conditions in inhospitable country, and became trapped by swollen rivers in the Wet Season, and were forced to eat their horses to stay alive, and returned to the coast on a makeshift raft constructed of saplings and horse hide, finally returning to the depot emaciated, shoeless and in rags, but they had made a preliminary survey of the site of present-day Darwin and the upper reaches of Daly River.

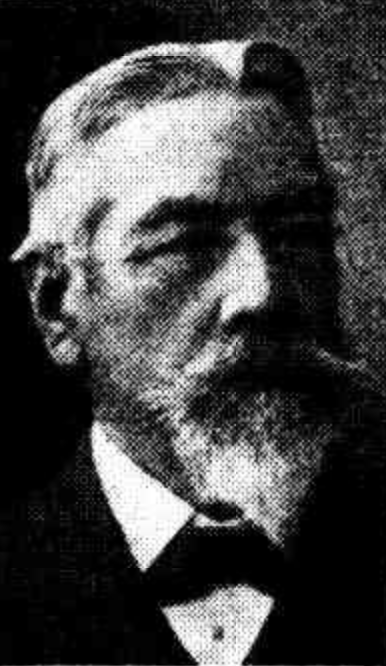
R. H. Edmunds, c.1915?

Edmunds returned to Adelaide in 1866 and received an appointment in the Treasury. In September, 1870, he transferred back to the Customs, then in April 1874, was transferred to the Yatala Labour Prison as storekeeper, then from 1 December 1892 he served as Superintendent of that institution. During that time he performed useful work as a member of the Lunacy Commission with Dr. Ramsay Smith and James Gordon, enquiring into lunacy administration in South Australia, New South Wales, and Victoria, and on their recommendations improvements were made to operations at the Parkside Lunatic Asylum. He retired on 30 June 1904.

Edmunds suffered a stroke two years before he died on 12 February 1917 at his home in Childers Street, North Adelaide. He was survived by his wife, four sons and three daughters.

== Recognition ==
- He was bestowed ISO in January 1905
- Edmunds Street, Darwin was named in his honour

== Family ==
Robert Henry Edmunds married Emily Beare (c. 1844 – 28 May 1925), daughter of T. Hudson Beare, on 3 October 1863. Their children were:

- Daniel Thomas Edmunds (22 June 1864 – 25 September 1925) architect, of Katanning, WA
- Horace Julian Edmunds (10 July 1867 – 13 August 1951) accountant, Islington workshops
- Charlotte Mary Lucy Edmunds (1869–1882)
- Arthur Melita Strickland Edmunds (29 June 1871 – 5 April 1930) engineer, Islington workshops
- Alice Emily Edmunds (1873–1948) married Ernest William Ryton (d. 20 July 1919) in 1907; married Rolfe Beaumont in 1923
- Louis George Edmunds (1875 – 23 August 1911) chemist
- Robert Hugo Edmunds (1877 – 14 July 1909) railway guard died in work accident
- Myra Jane Edmunds (1879–1885)
- John Leonard Edmunds (1881–1881)
- Charles Augustus Edmunds (13 January 1883 – 7 June 1941), solicitor and Red Cross worker
- Olive Lucy Mary Edmunds (27 September 1884 – 1971) married Percy Croft in 1905, divorced 1923; married William Peter Orr in 1924
- Ida May Edmunds (10 November 1887 – 1973) married Frederick James Blades (d. 23 June 1952) in 1906

There is no reason to believe George Francis Edmunds (d. 12 July 1894), also on Finniss's October 1864 expedition, was related.

CORRECTION: They were brothers. George Francis Edmunds born 17 Sep 1839 - d. 12 Apr 1894. They along with two sisters and their parents, Daniel & Mary (Clisby) EDMUNDS arr. in South Australia on the CALPHURNIA in 1849.
