= Moonta Herald and Northern Territory Gazette =

The Moonta Herald and Northern Territory Gazette was a newspaper produced on the vessel SS Moonta that was sailed by George Goyder in 1868 and 1869 from Port Adelaide to Darwin. The aim of the 41-day voyage was to provide an initial survey of what was to become the Northern Territory.

It consisted of five issues (Saturdays, 2-30 January 1869) and a supplement (Wednesday 24 February 1869), and an additional issue that was released when the vessel reached Port Darwin, where its reporting captures some of the earliest colonial impressions of the sea and land surrounding the site. The issues, which were distributed to all the people on Moonta, contained comedic articles, a lost and found section, advertisements for on-board events such as concerts, and more. The original newspapers were hand-written, but it was professionally printed later in Adelaide.
