= Robert Peel (doctor) =

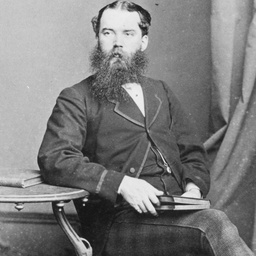
- Born: Robert Peele; 3 June 1835; Durham, England
- Died: 11 January 1894 (aged 58); Adelaide
- Education: St Bartholomew's Hospital, London
- Medical career
- Profession: Surgeon

Robert Peel (3 June 1935 – 11 January 1894) was a medical practitioner in South Australia remembered for his membership of the Goyder expedition to the Northern Territory and for his association with Adelaide's horse racing clubs.

== History ==
Peel trained for the medical profession in England and had some experience as ship's surgeon on immigrant ships. Around 1865 he was recommended by Colonial Surgeon Dr. R. W. Moore to a vacancy as house surgeon at the Adelaide Hospital. In 1866 he was appointed Assistant Colonial Surgeon in charge of the Mount Gambier district. While there where he was involved in local affairs: he was active in the formation of the Mount Gambier Institute, to which body he later donated specimens and curios collected in the Northern Territory, and was a Past Master of the Mount Gambier Lodge of Freemasons.

In 1868, a year or so prior to the long-awaited opening of the Mount Gambier Hospital, he accepted an invitation to join George Goyder's surveying expedition to Darwin, Northern Territory, which left Port Adelaide on the Moonta around 26 December 1868. Peel's successor at Mount Gambier was Dr. James Jackson MD.

On his return to Adelaide on the barque Kohinoor in April 1870, he started practising on his own account, with a surgery on North Terrace, partly in conjunction with Dr. Thomas Cawley, with whom he shared an interest in thoroughbred racing. Dr. Peel served as surgeon to the racing clubs, and was a committeeman of the Licensed Victuallers' Racing Club, which afterwards amalgamated with the Adelaide Racing Club. "Dr. Peel devoted himself to certain branches of his profession, and established for himself a name second to none in the colony in his particular speciality."

In 1876 he was elected to represent Hindmarsh ward in the Adelaide City Council, serving until the end of 1877. In April 1884 he was one of fourteen candidates for the six vacant seats in the Legislative Council, but polled poorly.

In 1880, following a journey to England, he joined in partnership with Dr. Beaney of Collins Street, Melbourne. Around 1891 he returned to Adelaide, where on 26 June 1891 Peel was a passenger on the Hindmarsh tram, when he was thrown off after the tram jumped the points, landing on his back. His injuries were judged as slight, but he never recovered his accustomed fitness, and four years later died suddenly in a fit at the General Havelock Hotel.

His remains were buried in the West Terrace Cemetery. Among the small group of mourners were Dr. Cawley, also S. King and J. Le M. F. Roberts, fellow members of the Goyder expedition. He had no relatives in Australia; a brother, who predeceased him, was a physician at the Children's Hospital, Dublin.

== Recognition ==
Peel Street, Darwin was named for him, as was Peel's Well. Doctors Gully in Darwin was also named for him.

Peel Street, Adelaide was named for the British statesman not, as has been asserted, the Adelaide doctor.
