= Richard John Loveday =

Richard John Loveday (1818–1883) was a government surveyor during the early settlement of South Australia.

Loveday was born near London on 19 December 1818. He was a lance corporal in the Royal Sappers and Miners, serving in Ireland and subsequently South Australia having arrived on the Royal George in 1847. Loveday, his wife and three children emigrated to South Australia aboard Royal George, arriving in June 1847. Their fourth, Mary, was born in Adelaide in 1850. Bridget died two years later, and Loveday married again, in the same year, and had another ten children.

He found employment with the civil service as a surveyor under Surveyor-General Sir Arthur Henry Freeling, and is known for mapping part of Lake Alexandrina.

His sons Richard, jun. and Thomas were in 1868 members of George Goyder's survey party that defined the settlement that became Darwin, Northern Territory

Loveday died in Adelaide on 15 December 1883.

== Family ==
Loveday married Bridget Shea ( –1852) in Limerick, Ireland in 1841. They had four children:

- Ann Loveday ( – ) married Robert Alexander Rose in 1861
- Richard John Loveday, jun. (1844–1925) married Jane Hampton Lawder ( –1905) in 1863
- Thomas Loveday (1846– ) married Barbara Carmichael ( –1906) in 1883
- Mary Elizabeth Loveday (1850 – ) married Richard Stanton in 1871

Bridget died in Adelaide in 1852 and Loveday married Susannah Sarah Sadgrove ( –1905) later that same year. They had ten children, including:

- Alice Susannah Loveday (1855– ) married William Henry Baker in 1876
- Henry William Loveday (1856– )
- George Henry Sadgrove Loveday (1860– ) perhaps also known as Henry George Loveday
- Alexander William Loveday (c. 1861 – 20 July 1942) married Elizabeth Fisher ( –1926) in 1882; married Alice Charlotte Mant (c. 1884 – 1 February 1941) in 1928
- Emily Agnes Loveday (1864– ) married Edward Stanton in 1884
- Frances Jane Loveday (1866– ) married John Williams in 1892
- Ernest Alfred Loveday (1868– ) married Elizabeth Frances Mead in 1894
- Edith Marion Blanch Loveday (1870–1871)

== Legacy ==
Loveday Bay at the south-eastern end of Lake Alexandrina, Loveday Street in Goolwa, and Loveday Creek in the Northern Territory are named after Loveday. The settlement of Loveday in South Australia is named after one of Loveday's sons, Ernest Alfred Loveday.
