= Richard Randall Knuckey =

Surveyor on the Overland Telegraph Line

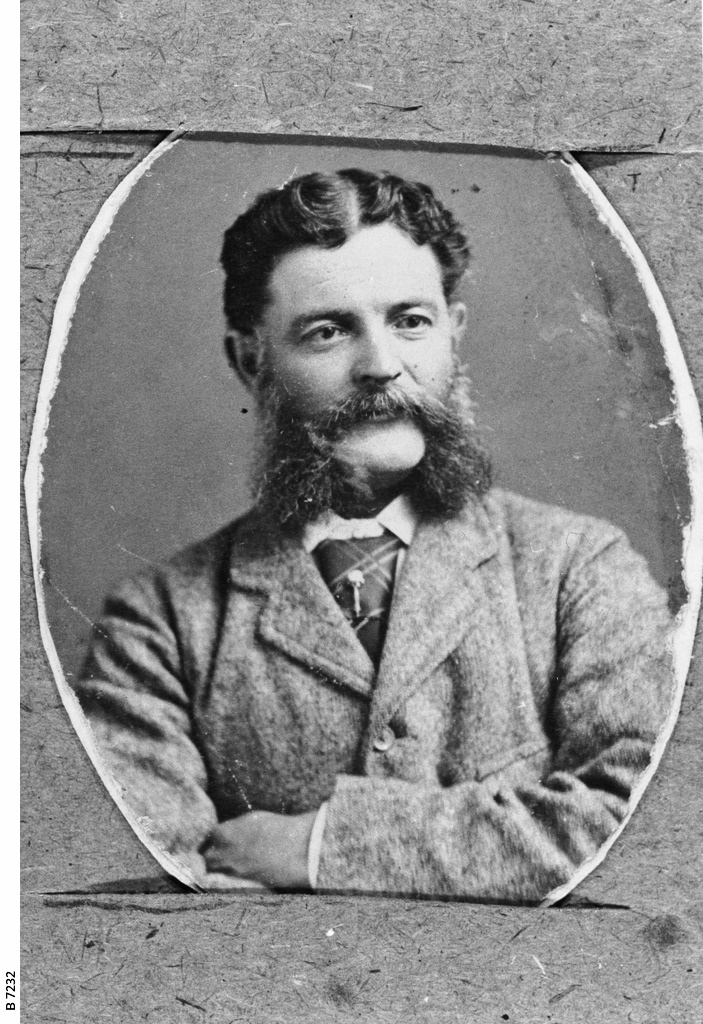
- R.R. Knuckey, surveyor
- Born: 26 September 1842; Stithians, Cornwall
- Died: 14 June 1914 (aged 71); College Park, Adelaide
- Occupation: Surveyor
- Known for: Surveying outback Australia

Richard Randall Knuckey (26 September 1842 – 14 June 1914), often referred to as R.R. Knuckey and popularly known as Dick Knuckey, was a surveyor on the Overland Telegraph Line in central Australia from 1871 to 1872. He later became chief officer at the electric telegraph department in Adelaide.

== Early life ==
Randall was born in Stithians, in Cornwall, England, on 26 September 1842, of parents Richard Knuckey and Persis Reed. He arrived in South Australia with his family in 1849 as a six-year-old, and was educated at Burra and Kapunda.

== Career ==
In 1866 he joined the survey department as a chainman, was soon appointed cadet and thereafter rose up through the ranks. Engaged by George Goyder as a second-class surveyor in 1868, he joined Goyder's expedition to the Northern Territory to survey Darwin and the surrounding country, the party arriving in Port Darwin on 5 February 1869. Knuckey was in A.J. Mitchell's No.1 party.

He was then involved in surveying the hundreds of Snowtown and Port Wakefield.

After being recommended to Sir Charles Todd (then head of the telegraph department) by Goyder (then surveyor-general), Knuckey was appointed to take charge of Section A of the Overland Telegraph Line in 1870. Charlotte Waters, just north of the South Australian border in the Northern Territory, was surveyed in 1871 by Gilbert McMinn and Knuckey.

After successful completion of this section, he pushed on and oversaw construction of the line to Roper River and Daly. With surveying completed, Knuckey was appointed overseer of Section A (Charlotte Waters) of the construction party. After the line had been completed on 22 August 1872 and the first messages had been exchanged, Knuckey accompanied Todd on the return journey from Central Mount Stuart to Adelaide, where they were given an enthusiastic reception.

Back in South Australia, Knuckey was selected by Sir Charles Todd as overseer in the erection of the telegraph line from Port Augusta, South Australia to Eucla in Western Australia – a distance of 759 miles (1,221 km) – in 1876. From 1880 until his retirement in 1889, Knuckey was inspector of postal and telegraph services.

== Later life ==
After retirement, Knuckey oversaw the construction of a telegraph line for the New South Wales Government from Narromine to Peak Hill for about a year, before heading to Western Australia to try his luck on the Western Australian goldfields. Not having any luck with finding gold, he returned to South Australia in 1911.

Not long before his death, he travelled to Powell's Creek with a team. (Note: This was probably the same Powell('s) Creek in the Northern Territory reached by Walter Baldwin Spencer.)

He died at Miss Hill's Hospital (Note: See notes on Calvary Wakefield Hospital talk page. This hospital may have been the forerunner of that one.) in College Park, a suburb of Adelaide.

== Legacy ==
Popularly known as "Dick" Knuckey, he was recognised as one of the best bushmen in the country; his name was a "household word" at the time.

He was responsible for giving English names to both Charlotte Waters, Northern Territory and Dalhousie Springs.

Knuckey Street in Darwin was named after him, one of several named after surveyors by Goyder.
