= Stephen King (surveyor) =

English sketcher, surveyor, and explorer (1841–1915)

Stephen King (15 December 1841 – 8 October 1915) was an English sketcher, surveyor, and explorer. He was part of the last John McDouall Stuart Expedition (1861–1862), successfully crossing Australia from south to north, and was appointed Surveyor of the Overland Telegraph party sent out by Darwent and Dalwood in 1870. He was called Stephen King, junior during the lifetime of his father, a pioneer of Gawler, and to a lesser extent continued through his life. His father has been called here and elsewhere Stephen King JP.

== Stephen King JP ==
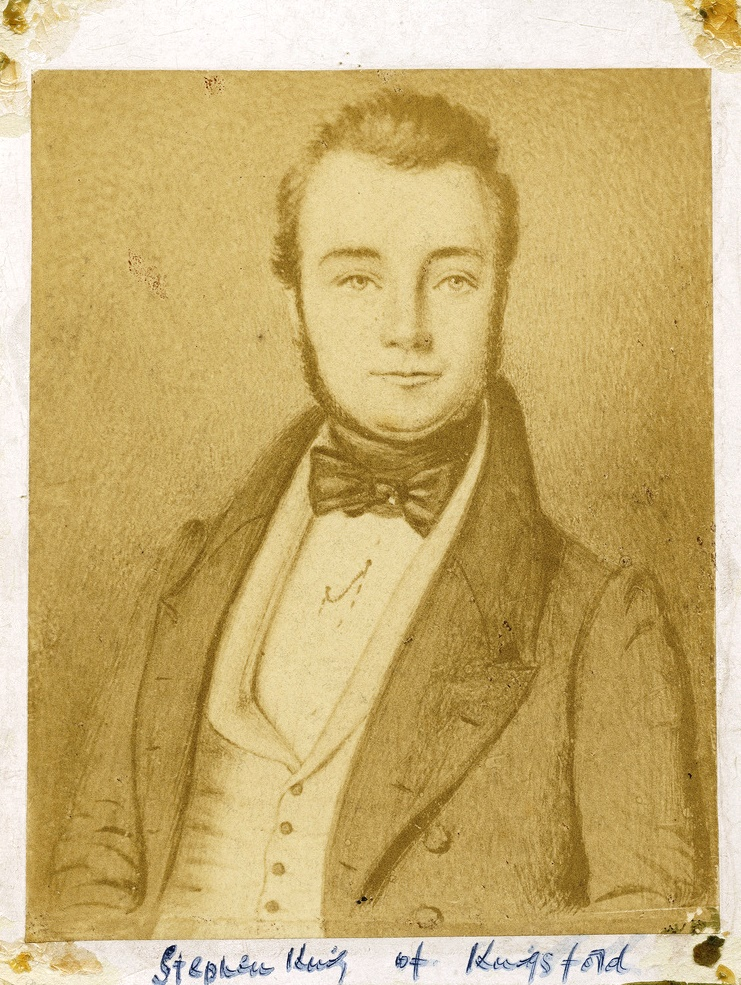
Stephen King JP pioneer of Gawler SA

King was born at Holton le Clay, Lincolnshire, England on 17 August 1806, the eldest son of Stephen King Sr, farmer, of Kelby, near Braceby, Lincolnshire and his wife Hannah née Witty.

He followed his father as a farmer and grazier in Lincolnshire, and married Martha, the fifth daughter of William Robinson, of Ashwell, Rutland, and had one daughter Matilda. The three of them migrated to South Australia aboard Orleana, arriving in January 1839.

He lodged an application with John Reid, H. D. Murray, and T. Stubbs for the purchase of Gawler Special Survey of 4,000 acres, which was successful, and King selected an area called Nuncalta on the North Para River, and there established a homestead and sheep station "Kingsford", around 6 miles (10 km) from Gawler.

Around 1845, King founded the Victoria Flour Mill in Gawler, "opposite Miss Calton's Old Spot Inn", named for his daughter not the monarch. Finding it unable to cope with demand, he had it converted to steam power and renamed it the Victoria Steam Flour Mill. He sold the business to Walter Duffield in 1847; the mill was destroyed by fire in 1867. He purchased many of the allotments offered in the first sales of the Town of Gawler.

He also had extensive squatting leases or rights near Sheaoak Log, Templers, and on the River Wakefield near Rhynie, and stocked them with sheep and cattle from Tasmania and South Africa.

Then came the Victorian gold rush, when most able-bodied men were moving east in search of the precious metal. Around 1851 King fitted out a small party of men from his station with horses and dray to try their luck. They travelled overland via Wentworth and Swan Hill to the diggings with six months' provisions. They had some success, and divided the gold as arranged, and were all able to go farming on their own land, purchased from the proceeds of their journey. Nor did they forget the generosity of Mr. King.

With increasing value of his (leasehold) land, it had become too valuable for grazing, and King was obliged to send his stock further north to Baldina, then to Outalpa, and spent large sums of money in sinking wells. Then came a dreadful drought, when many pastoralists had heavy stock losses, and King was forced to sell up in a buyer's market, losing all his rural properties including Kingsford.

He found employment in 1865 as Special Magistrate for the Government at Port Augusta and Melrose, but lost that position in a series of retrenchments. His last Government appointment was as inspector of timber, located in Western Australia, being responsible for jarrah imports for the South Australian Railways. He retired in poor health to his home on Kensingston Terrace, where he died aged 76 years.

=== Recognition ===
King Street, Gawler, was named for him, and Victoria Terrace and Victoria Place may have referred to the Mill, destroyed by fire in 1867, or its successor, demolished before 1900.

== Stephen King Jr ==
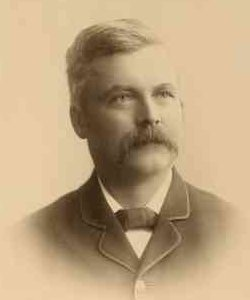
Stephen King Jr c. 1885

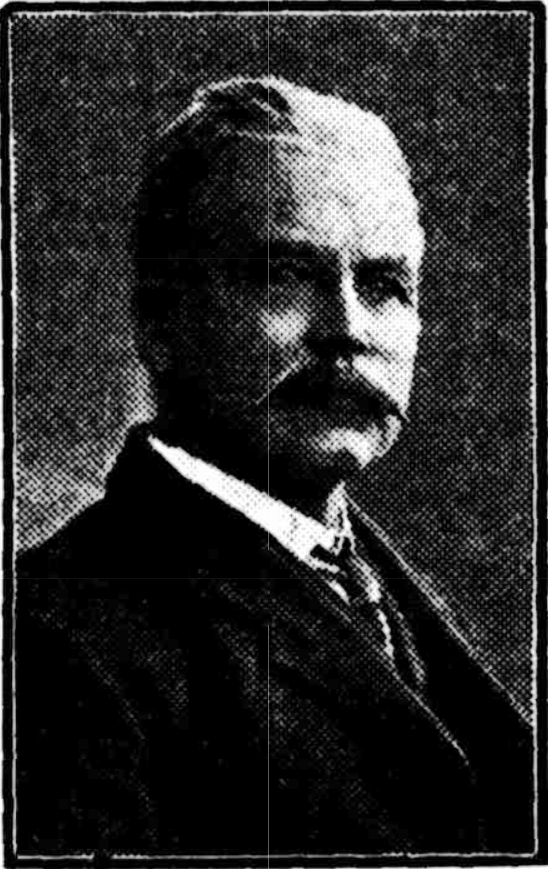
Stephen King Jr in 1915

Stephen King Jr was born on the family property "Kingsford" on the North Para River near Gawler, the third (at least) in a line of eldest sons to be named "Stephen".

He was educated by private tutors A. K. Varley, James Fawsett, and Dr W. M. Dickenson, then at the Adelaide Educational Institution 1859–60. He also received training from Canon Coombs and Dean Russell, presumably with a view to joining the Anglican clergy,

=== Stuart expedition ===
He left his father's station in 1861, and joined Stuart's transcontinental party, enduring great hardships on the 4,000 miles (6,400 km) journey, which lasted from 1 October 1861 to February 1863, and on 25 July 1862 reached the north coast of Australia and hoisted the Union Jack on the shores of Adam Bay, 30 miles (48 km) from Darwin. Apart from his duties as explorer and surveyor, he made sketches of the expedition for the leader, and it was King who marked the letters "J. McD. S" on the tree later discovered G. R. McMinn.

A sister constructed a flag used to welcome the returning party.

In 1863, he was employed by C. B. Fisher and Benjamin Rochfort droving cattle from Pekina Station to Gunnawarrah, near Swan Hill, Victoria.

=== The Top End ===
In 1864, King joined B. T. Finniss's expedition to the Northern Territory, and was put in charge of stock being carried by the steamer South Australian for the projected settlement at Adam Bay. The sheep were landed at Escape Cliffs, and then he had charge of the horse party, with F. H. Litchfield's expedition to the head of the Adelaide River and back. During that journey King contracted malaria, and in a high fever was perilously ill. He was carried back to the depot in a litter, a week's march, and Dr. Ninnis sent for. The doctor arrived after a ride of two days, and ordered the patient's return to Adelaide.

Litchield discovered the Finniss and Reynolds Rivers, and found gold in the gorge of an ancient stream at the base of Mount Bennett (lat. 12.55 S.).

On his return to Adelaide in February 1860, King was employed by the Government Survey Department in various surveying projects around the colony.

=== The Overland Telegraph Line ===
From December 1868 to March 1870, King worked for George Goyder in the survey of Darwin township, then from August 1870 was employed as surveyor by Darwent & Dalwood, who had contracted to construct the northernmost 600 miles (970 km) of the Overland Telegraph Line. The contract over, King joined the Government service under (later Sir) Charles Todd, and R. C. Patterson. He led the advance party as far as Powells Creek. During this period he opened the first track for teams from Elsie Creek to the Roper River landing, and constructed a jetty near Leichhardts Bar.

He also opened up the first track to Daly Waters. It was about this time that the overdue return to base station of work parties under Walter Rutt and R. C. Burton was causing concern. They were presumed stranded north of Elsie Creek, and short of stores, but their exact whereabouts was unknown. King and Giles were despatched with teams and packhorses, and arrived in time to relieve them, but not before they had been driven to the expedient of killing some of their draught cattle.

=== Return to Adelaide ===
In 1874, King returned to the Survey Department, and until 1893 was employed in a range of projects around the colony, but with health failing, less arduous work was found for him in Adelaide.

In 1912 he retired to his home "Calta Wurlie", on Kensington Terrace, Kensington.

He died on 8 October 1915 at the age of 74, and was buried in North Road Cemetery, Nailsworth, South Australia, leaving a widow, three sons, and five daughters.

Prior to his death, King and his cousin and brother-in-law J. W. Billiatt (then living in Devonshire, England) were the last survivors of the John McDouall Stuart exploration party, which successfully crossed Australia from south to north.

=== Recognition ===
King was granted honorary membership of the SA branch of the Royal Geographical Society of Australasia.

He was made an honorary member of the Australian Natives' Association.

The following places were named for him: (Note: Note: Kings Canyon and the associated creek were named by Ernest Giles for his friend Fielder King.)

- King River (a tributary of the Katherine River); named by G. R. McMinn
- Kings Creek, Litchfield Council Area; named by W. P. Auld in 1865
- Kings Pond; named by McDouall Stuart in 1863
- King Place, Jabiru, Northern Territory
- King Street, Urapunga
- King Street, Union Town, Northern Territory (probably)

== Family ==
Stephen King, JP. (17 August 1806 – 15 January 1882) was married to Martha King née Robinson (1814 – 7 July 1881), arrived SA aboard Orleana in January 1839 with their daughter Matilda.

- Matilda King (c. 1837 – 29 April 1909) married Charles Algernon Wilson (c. 1818 – 20 June 1884) on 22 May 1860. He was Registrar of the Supreme Court. She was a noted collector and painter of Australian native botanical specimens; did work for Richard Schomburgk.
- Victoria King (8 October 1839 – 5 May 1917 ) married Edward Regia Hallett (6 April 1837 – 10 July 1909), sheepfarmer and son of John Hallett on 8 December 1863, lived at Winninnie then Kensington
- Stephen King Jr. (15 December 1841 – 8 October 1915) married Louisa Mercy Margaret Barnes (c. 1858 – December 1951) of Blinman on 24 December 1877.

- Stephen Robinson King (1879 – ) married Alwine Emma Baum ( – ) followed King family naming convention
- Victoria Louisa Mercy King (1881 – )
- Martha Annie Ramsay King (1890 – )
- Dorothy Ellen Mary King (1894 – )
- Stuart Gawler King (1896 – )

- Ann Elizabeth King (c. 1844 – 15 February 1950) married cousin John William Billiatt (1842 – 6 April 1919) on 15 September 1863.
- Alice King (1847 – 1910) maybe married James Dean ( – ) in 1876?
- Frances Mary King (14 August 1849 – )
- Wilhelmina Robinson King (1853 – 1944) married Frederic William Vickery in 1874
- Martha Freer King (1856 – )

Was Maria King (c. 1808 – 31 January 1891), who married John Hallett (30 August 1804 – 10 June 1868), and mother of Edward Regia Hallett, who married Victoria King, a sister ?

He was the cousin of fellow expedition member John William Billiatt.

He was not related to explorer John King (1838–1872), sole survivor of the famous Burke and Wills expedition.

== Historic photos ==
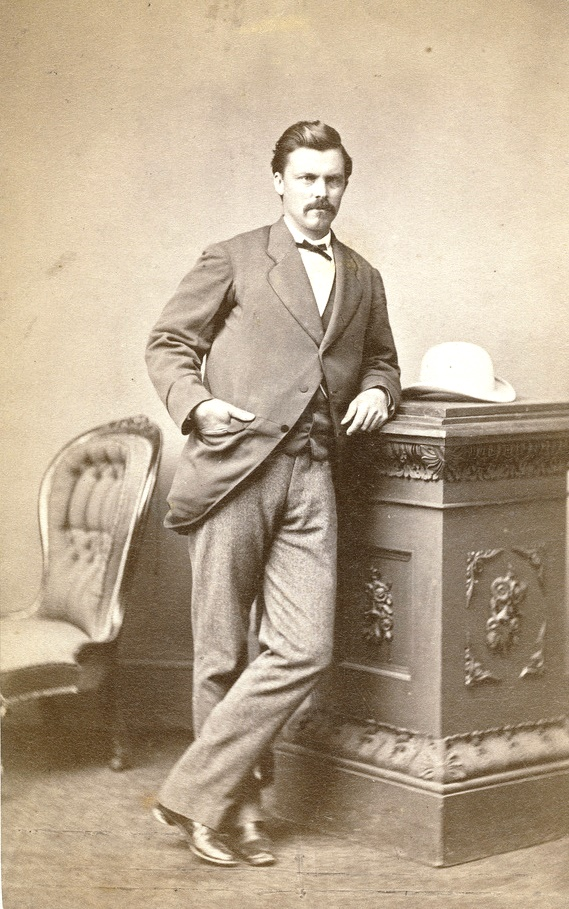
Stephen King, surveyor and explorer SA and N

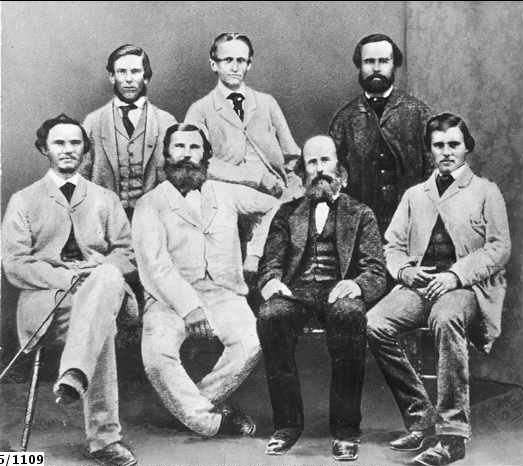
1861. Auld Billiatt Thring, Frew Kekwick Waterhouse King. Absent: Stuart Nash McGorrery

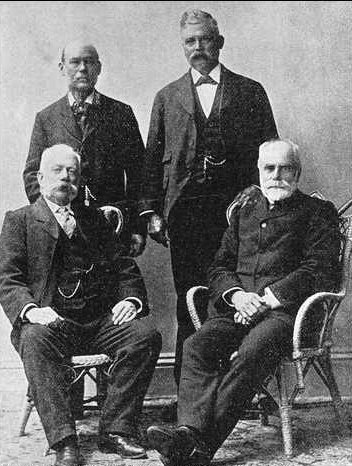
1900. Nash King, Auld Thring

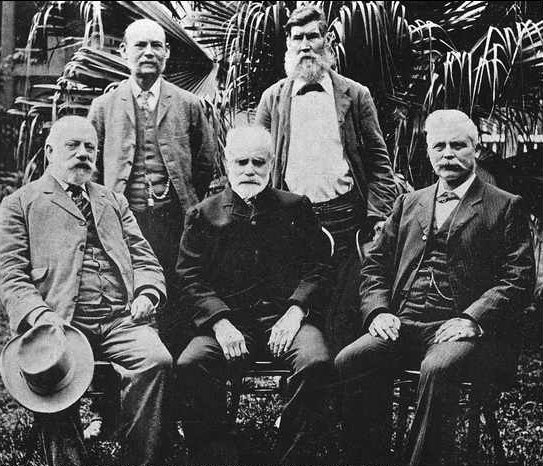
1904. Nash Gorrery, Auld Thring King

State Library of South Australia has a collection of photos relating to Stephen King.
