= Edwin Mitchell Smith =

English surveyor (1847-1929)

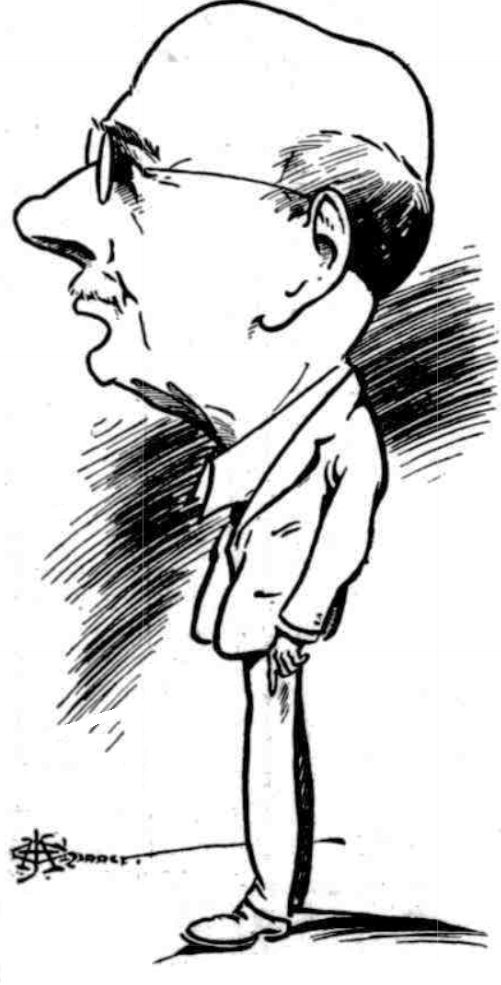
- Caricature by J. H. Chinner
- Born: 18 March 1847; Ipswich, Suffolk, England
- Died: 21 April 1929 (aged 82); Kircaldy, South Australia
- Resting place: North Road Cemetery, Nailsworth, South Australia
- Occupation: Surveyor
- Spouse: Frances Lettice Porter (m. 1870; died 1920)
- Children: 4
- Parents: Edwin Smith (father); Hannah Mitchell (mother)
- Relatives: George Goyder (uncle)

Edwin Mitchell Smith (18 March 1847 – 21 April 1929) was Surveyor General of South Australia from 1911 to 1917.

== History ==
Smith was born at Ipswich, Suffolk, England, eldest son of Edwin Smith (died March 1907) and his wife Hannah Smith, née Mitchell, and left England with his parents and sister aboard the ship Bolivar for South Australia, arriving in late January 1850. They lived at Medindie, where his father, who served for several years as chairman of Walkerville Council, developed a reputation as rose-grower. He was educated at private schools, (Note: No details of his schooling have been found, but his name does not appear in lists of prizewinners of J. L. Young's Adelaide Educational Institution, unlike most young South Australian draftsmen and surveyors of the period.) and joined the Survey Department as a field assistant or chainman on 1 June 1862, and in his first years was attached to a team doing survey work in the Mount Gambier area, followed by the Anlaby estate, Hill River and Bungaree regions. He was promoted to cadet surveyor the following year, working in the Clare district, and expected to take charge of the party when the supervisor was absent. He was appointed junior surveyor in June 1866, and put in charge of a survey party, initially under supervision of W. C. Gosse. In 1869 he was a member of his uncle, Goyder's expedition to the Northern Territory, which surveyed the land for the settlement of Port Darwin, returning by the Gulnare in September 1869. In 1874 he was appointed draftsman, and in February 1882 he was appointed Steward and Surveyor of Educational Lands. (Note: The Education Act of 1875, among other things, provided for the lease by the State Government of 400,000 acres (160,000 ha) of Waste Lands, the rental of was to be dedicated to provision of schoolhouses and salaries of teachers.) In January 1886 he was appointed Chief Clerk in charge of the Public Lands Office and remained there for nine years. Following Goyder's resignation and the accession of William Strawbridge, Smith was appointed Deputy Surveyor-General (Note: Smith and Strawbridge commenced work at the Survey Department at the same time.) in July, 1894. He acted as Surveyor-General for a total of around three years before being appointed to the office on 1 July 1911. He retired voluntarily on 31 March 1917.

He died at Beach Cottage, Kirkcaldy. His remains were buried at the North Road Cemetery.

== Other interests ==
While holding the office he occupied a number of other positions, including chairmanship of

- the Land Board,
- the Pastoral Board,
- the South-Eastern Drainage Board
- the Advances to Settlers' Board

He was a member of

- the Advisory Council of Aboriginals
- the Aborigines' Friends' Association
- the Da Costa Samaritan Trust
- the Church of England: from 1875 to 1881 he was warden at St Paul's Church, Adelaide, and for more than thirty years was a warden at St Peter's Cathedral
- the Royal Geographical Society, serving as president for some years
- Charitable Funds Commission, with Peter Whitington (formerly Commissioner of Audit) and Lionel H. Sholl, C.M.G. (formerly Under-secretary).

== Recognition ==
He was awarded the Imperial Service Order in 1916.

== Family ==
Smith married Frances Lettice Porter (c. 1845 – 6 September 1920) of Parkside on 1 June 1870. Their children included:

- Archibald John "Archie" Smith (1872–1945), of Melbourne
- (Frances) Evelyn Smith (1874 – 24 April 1953), of Medindie
- Norman Morley Alexander Smith (6 January 1877 – 24 December 1944) married Lillian Goode (11 July 1879 – ), daughter of Thomas Goode (pastoralist), on 16 June 1904; lived in Hawthorn, South Australia
- Estelle Laura Smith (1880– ) married Willy Theodore Alexander Drechsel in Dresden, Germany on 24 March 1903; moved to New York 1924. Their son Edwin Jared Drechsel was a noted magazine editor.

They had a home on The Avenue, Medindie, South Australia, later on Arthur Street in the same suburb.
