= Samuel Sweet =

Sea captain

Captain Samuel White Sweet
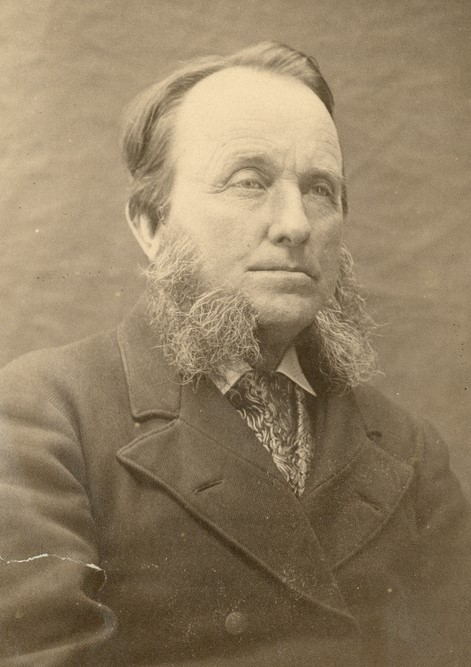
- Born: 1 May 1825; Portsea, Portsmouth, England
- Died: 4 January 1886 (aged 60); Riverton, South Australia, Australia
- Occupations: Photographer & merchant ship master
- Spouse: Elizabeth Tilly

Captain Samuel White Sweet (1 May 1825 – 4 January 1886) was an English sea captain who settled in Australia in 1864, and was involved in the early colonization of the Northern Territory. After the grounding of his ships Gulnare and Wallaroo, for both of which he was held culpable, he turned his interest in photography from a serious hobby and part-time occupation to a profession. Sweet was a pioneer of Australian landscape photography as an art form, and kept abreast of technical advances in the medium.

== Background ==
Sweet was born in Portsea, a few km inland from Portsmouth, Hampshire, and had only a basic education.

In 1844 Sweet joined the Royal Navy at age nineteen, serving on the China Station until 1849. Sweet gained command of the merchant ship Pizarro in 1857 for which he kept the meteorological log for the Board of Trade for several years. These efforts resulted in Sweet being awarded "Letters of Honorable Mentions". In 1861 Sweet travelled the South American waters carrying out surveys for the charts of the British Admiralty. He married in Portsea and had several children in England. In 1864 Sweet and his family arrived in Queensland, Australia to grow cotton having migrated from England on the Flying Cloud. In 1866 Sweet set up his first photographic practice in partnership with William Gibson. From this time Sweet committed himself to photography and in 1868 applied for the role of the official photographer for the Goyder Northern Territory Expedition, however was instead appointed as Commander of the Government Schooner Gulnare which supported the Goyder Expedition and the new settlement at Port Darwin. Whilst Sweet was never the official photographer of this trip (Joseph Brooks was the appointee), Sweet did take on some of Brooks' photographic duties while he was busy surveying. As a result of this, during his return from the North Sweet organised exhibitions and lectures of his views surrounding the trip and secured sales of his prints through James Williams's Stationery shop. In 1870 Sweet was also commissioned to supply northern construction teams who were building the British-Australian overland telegraph link from Darwin to Port Adelaide. Sweet's views are the only record of this event. At this time he was also commissioned to survey the Roper River. Sweet made five voyages between Adelaide and the Northern Territory between 1869 and 1872, taking photographs alongside managing his main duties.

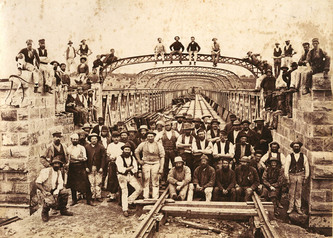
Albumen print of a group of labourers taken by Captain Samuel Sweet in 1880

=== Schooner Gulnare ===
Previously a slaver in the Caribbean, the 150-ton two-masted schooner was purchased by the South Australian Government in 1869 and refurbished as the Northern Territory supply vessel, replacing Sea Ripple, which had been condemned as unfit for service. Within a few weeks Sweet had been appointed her commander and left for the Northern Territory. In 1870 Gulnare took the first Government Resident, Bloomfield Douglas, to Port Darwin. She then acted as a Goyder's supply ship. Sweet stayed on as captain and H. R. Marsh, later captain of Flying Cloud, was mate.

The wreck

Gulnare, under Captain Sweet, left Darwin Harbour for the Roper River at 7am on 5 October 1871, and that same night she ran aground on one of the reefs that surround the Vernon Islands. The Bengal under Captain Hummel set out from Darwin to render assistance on the 10th, and after removing twenty tons of cargo assisted in dragging Gulnare free, and returned to Darwin on the 13th. Gulnare returned to Darwin on the 14th and run onto the beach to have her hull inspected. At an inquiry on 19 October Sweet testified that he was confident that Gulnare was sufficiently seaworthy to return to Adelaide, but the crew had deserted her to work on the Overland Telegraph Line. Sweet insisted that Gulnare could be repaired in a week at most, and could profitably make a return voyage to Adelaide, but she was deemed unseaworthy and abandoned.

The Darwin enquiry had no authority to judge Sweet's actions, and at a properly constituted Court of Enquiry held at Port Adelaide on 25 and 26 July 1872, Sweet was found to have been lacking in judgment and censured, but his certificate of competency was returned to him, but he lost his government commission.

He then captained the barque Wallaroo, transporting coal from Newcastle to South Australia. On 11 May 1875 Wallaroo became grounded on Office Beach, Wallaroo during a gale. An inquest attributed the grounding to Sweet's miscalculation, and he was censured for neglect, but again did not lose his ticket. Sweet had already resigned his position with the Black Diamond Line; he retired from the sea and opened a photographic studio in Adelaide, marking the beginning of the most prolific period in his photographic career.

== Photography ==
By 1872 Sweet was an experienced photographer and opened a studio on Flinders Street, Adelaide, later moving to Rundle Street. At his studios Sweet took many portrait photographs but focused mainly on landscapes, travelling around South Australia with a horse-drawn darkroom, taking pictures of the Australian outback and homesteads, some of which were exhibited in Melbourne and Sydney. Sweet became one of the colony's largest documentary photographers during the 1870s through to the early 1880s. He was also one of the first photographers to use the new dry-plate/gelatin process during this time.

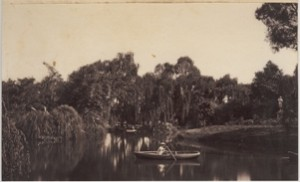
Albumen silver photograph taken by Captain Samuel Sweet at the lake in the Adelaide Botanic Gardens

On 4 January 1886 Sweet died suddenly due to sunstroke at "Halldale", home of the Hall family, near Riverton, South Australia.

== Family ==
He married Elizabeth "Betsey" Tilly some time before emigrating to Australia; they had five daughters and four sons, including:

- Elizabeth Marie "Lily" Sweet (c. 1854 – 28 October 1955) married John Arundel Anthony on 22 September 1883, died in Queensland
- Annie Emma Sweet (21 January 1857 – 30 May 1950) married William Richard Pybus on 28 September 1880. She was known as a fine singer.
- (third daughter) Rosa Sweet (c. 1859 – 19 February 1952) married William Gibson of Bowden on 11 September 1887, lived at Kingston SE
- (fourth daughter) Violet Sweet (c. 1862 – 24 October 1950) married Edwin James Moody (c. 1862 – 9 September 1938) of Rose Park on 31 October 1888, lived 53 Park Terrace, Hillside (now Ovingham)
- (fifth daughter) May Sweet (21 May 1867 – ) married Jabez Adams of Hamilton, Victoria on 30 March 1898
- (third son) Samuel Darwin Sweet (15 May 1869 – 7 May 1937) married Otena Hocking ( –1957) of Brompton on 14 September 1898
- George Howard Sweet (7 December 1871 – 23 July 1952) married Lily ??; lived in Merredin, Western Australia

== Recognition ==
- In the Northern Territory, Mount Sweet (named by George G. McLachlan, one of Goyder's chief surveyors), Sweet's Lookout (believed to have replaced Litchfield's "Mt. Hunchback") and Sweet Street, Darwin were named for him and Mrs. Sweet.
- A portfolio of his photos, taken in the Adelaide Botanic Gardens, was presented by Richard Schomburgk to the Prince of Wales after being exhibited at the Indian and Colonial Exhibition of 1886.
