= John McKinlay =

Scottish-born Australian explorer

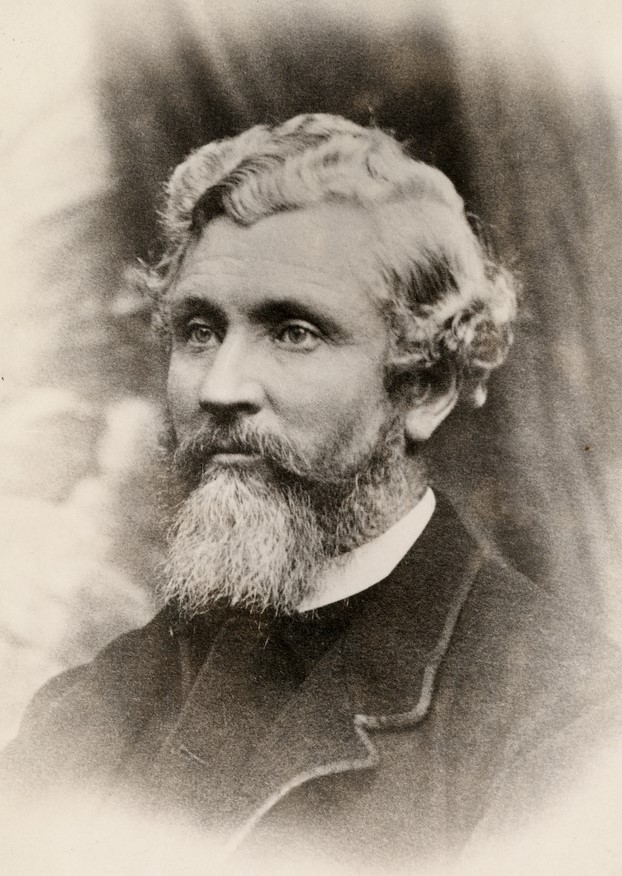
- John McKinlay (1819-1872)
- Born: 26 August 1819; Sandbank, Argyll, Scotland
- Died: 31 December 1872 (aged 53); Gawler, South Australia
- Occupations: Explorer and pastoralist
- Known for: Leading South Australia's Burke Relief Expedition

John McKinlay (26 August 1819 – 31 December 1872) was a Scottish-born Australian explorer and cattle grazier, and leader of the South Australian Burke Relief Expedition - one of the search parties for the Burke and Wills expedition. The town of McKinlay in northwestern Queensland is named after him.

== Early life ==
John McKinlay was born at Sandbank on the River Clyde, in county Argyle and Bute, Scotland. He was the third son of Dugald McKinlay, a merchant, and Catherine née McKellar. John McKinlay was educated at Dalinlongart School and migrated to New South Wales, Australia with his brother Alexander in 1836. The brothers worked with a squatter uncle until 1840 and afterward took up a property called "Yambro" on Lake Victoria between the Darling River and the South Australian border. John McKinlay was interested in the Indigenous Australians who inhabited the area, and his knowledge of their ways was of great use later when he became an explorer.

== South Australian Burke Relief Expedition ==
McKinlay was chosen by the South Australian House of Assembly in August 1861 to lead an expedition to search for the Burke and Wills expedition party, whose fate was unknown. McKinlay left Adelaide on 16 August 1861 with nine other men, 70 sheep, two packhorses and four camels. On 20 October 1861 the grave of a European, supposed to be Charles Gray, was found near Cooper Creek. However, after John King, the sole survivor of the Burke and Wills expedition, had recounted the events it was discovered that Charles Gray died north of Cooper Creek, near what is today known as Coongie Lake. The remains that McKinlay found are still unidentified to this day.

== Mid-life and Northern Territory exploration ==
On 17 January 1863 McKinlay married Jane Pile (c. 1837 – 14 February 1914), a daughter of James Pile (c. 1799 – 19 March 1885) an old friend and father of pastoralist and horse trainer John Pile, but was soon off exploring again. In September 1865 he was chosen to lead a party of twelve to explore the Northern Territory and to find a more suitable site for settlement than Escape Cliffs, to which B. T. Finniss had staked his reputation, and was proving a costly embarrassment.

== Late life ==
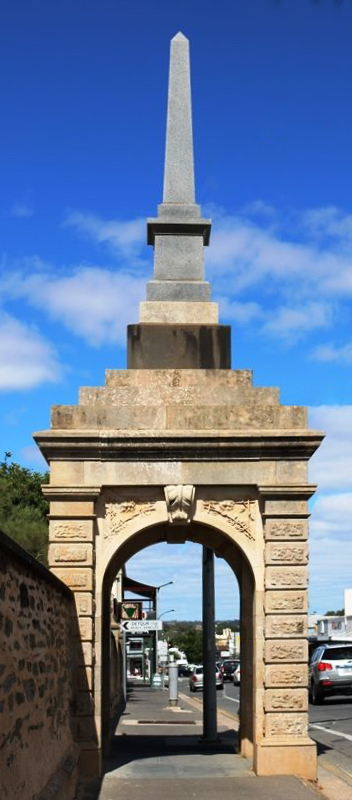
The McKinlay Monument, erected in memory of John McKinlay in 1875, is located in Gawler, South Australia.

After his return to South Australia from the Northern Territory in 1866, McKinlay took up pastoral pursuits near the town of Gawler, South Australia. John McKinlay died in Gawler on 31 December 1872. McKinlay was buried in the Willaston General Cemetery, with his wife Jane Pile, who died later in 1914. A monument to John McKinlay's memory was erected on the main street of Gawler, Murray Street, in 1875.

== See also ==
- Survey parties to the Northern Territory 1864–1870 Includes comprehensive lists of participants
