= Thomas Boutflower Bennett =

Australian settler

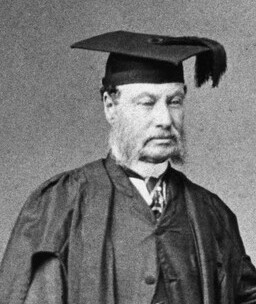

Thomas Boutflower Bennett (1808–14 September 1894) was an early colonist of South Australia, remembered as a schoolmaster at J. L. Young's Adelaide Educational Institution and at Saint Peter's College.

He married Elizabeth (14 January 1811–11 February 1899) and with two children arrived at Holdfast Bay on Somersetshire on 24 August 1839.

He started a distillery on the banks of the River Torrens at Klemzig, but was closed down by the Governor George Grey.

An attempt at sheep farming at Lovely Valley was unsuccessful, so he got a job at Moonta as accountant in the Boord Brothers store, then joined the rush to the Victorian goldfields.

In June 1861 he joined the staff of J. L. Young's Adelaide Educational Institution, and for 10 years taught English and bookkeeping and assisting in the school's running, then around 1871, when the school transferred to Parkside, took a position with St. Peter's College, perhaps for its greater proximity to his Payneham Road, Stepney home. He retired from teaching late 1879 or early 1880. He sold the family house in August 1894, having moved to live with his son in Port Lincoln, where he died.

== Family ==
- Ann Eliza Bennett (c. 1835 – 5 November 1889)
- Charles Bennett married Sarah (died 19 May 1880)
- John William Ogilvie Bennett (11 November 1845 – 28 May 1869) was a member of B. T. Finniss's 1864 expedition, and one of his few supporters. During this expedition he shot dead an Aboriginal man, for which he was recalled to Adelaide to stand trial, later exonerated. He returned to the Territory on George Goyder's 1869 survey expedition to Port Darwin. On 24 May he and a companion William Guy were attacked by aborigines, both being wounded by spears. Bennett died 28 May 1869 after Dr. Peel removed, under chloroform, a section of spear which had penetrated a lung. The wound was sutured but the case considered hopeless by Peel, and given a morphine draught. Bennett and Guy were on a working party with surveyor Richard Randall Knuckey at Fred's Pass on the Adelaide River on 24 May 1869. They had been left alone in the camp to do their drafting work when the attack occurred. Bennett had been on good terms with them previously and was working on an atlas of Wuna (Wulna) placenames. He was interred near the top of Fort Hill overlooking the harbour - the first white man to be buried in Darwin. Guy completely recovered from his wounds.
- Nathaniel William Ogle Bennett (c. 1850 – 26 August 1882), an officer with H. M. Customs Service.
- William Ogle Bennett (21 January 1855 – 7 March 1906), a Government agent in Port Lincoln then Moonta.

N. W. O. Bennett and W. O. Bennett married sisters Rebecca Caroline Raphael and Laura Raphael on 9 June and 4 October 1877 respectively.
