= George Goyder =

19th century surveyor in South Australia

George Woodroffe Goyder
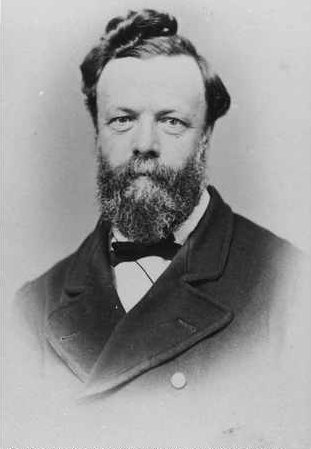
- George Woodroffe Goyder in 1869

Surveyor General of South Australia
- In office 31 January 1861 – 30 June 1894
- Preceded by: Sir Arthur Freeling
- Succeeded by: William Strawbridge

Personal details
- Born: 24 June 1826 Liverpool, England
- Died: 2 November 1898 (aged 72) Mylor, South Australia
- Resting place: Stirling District Cemetery
- Spouses: Frances Mary Smith (m. 1851; died 1870) Ellen Priscilla Smith (m. 1871)
- Children: 12
- Parents: David George Goyder (father); Sarah Goyder (mother)
- Relatives: Edwin Mitchell Smith (nephew)
- Occupation: Surveyor

George Woodroffe Goyder (24 June 1826 – 2 November 1898) was a surveyor in the Colony of South Australia during the latter half of the nineteenth century.

He rose rapidly in the civil service, becoming Assistant Surveyor-General by 1856 and the Surveyor General of South Australia in 1861. He is remembered today for Goyder's Line of rainfall, a line used in South Australia to demarcate land climatically suitable for arable farming from that suitable only for light grazing, and for the siting, planning and initial development of Darwin, the Northern Territory capital and principal population centre. However, Goyder was an avid researcher into the lands of South Australia (including the present-day Northern Territory) and made recommendations to a great number of settlers in the newly developing colony, especially to those exploiting the newly discovered mineral resources of the state.

== Career ==
=== Early life ===
Goyder was born in Liverpool, England to Sarah and David George Goyder, the latter a Swedenborgian minister and physician. He moved to Glasgow with his family where he worked with an engineering firm and studied surveying. In 1848, at the age of 22, Goyder followed his sister and brother-in-law, George Galbraith MacLachlan (c. 1842 – 19 March 1873), to Sydney. He spent time working with an auctioneering firm and moved to Adelaide in 1851, obtaining work as a civil service draftsman.

=== Assistant to Surveyor-General ===
Goyder's map of the region near Lake Torrens and Lake Eyre, drawn in 1864

Goyder was appointed Assistant Surveyor-General circa 1856. In this period he made many expeditions into the outback regions of South Australia, thinking that the water in lakes he saw at the time was fresh and permanent, rather than exceedingly erratic. He wrote many letters to newly established pastoralists who had moved into the arid regions for the state's north, and also surveyed the newly establishing mining industry in the Flinders Ranges.

In 1861 he was appointed Surveyor-General. His early years in the role were very difficult, especially his efforts to help establish settlement in the Northern Territory by supervising the establishment of the pastoral leaseholds that continue to the present day. Pastoralists were hit by a major drought in the middle of the decade and complained severely, with many forced to move even relatives away from their cattle stations by the end of 1865. Goyder was also faced with the despair of his wife, Frances Mary Smith, who suffered the loss of twins at birth during George's long travels in the outback.

Goyder resigned his position as Surveyor-General in 1894, completing a public service career that spanned 41 years.

=== Goyder's Line of rainfall ===
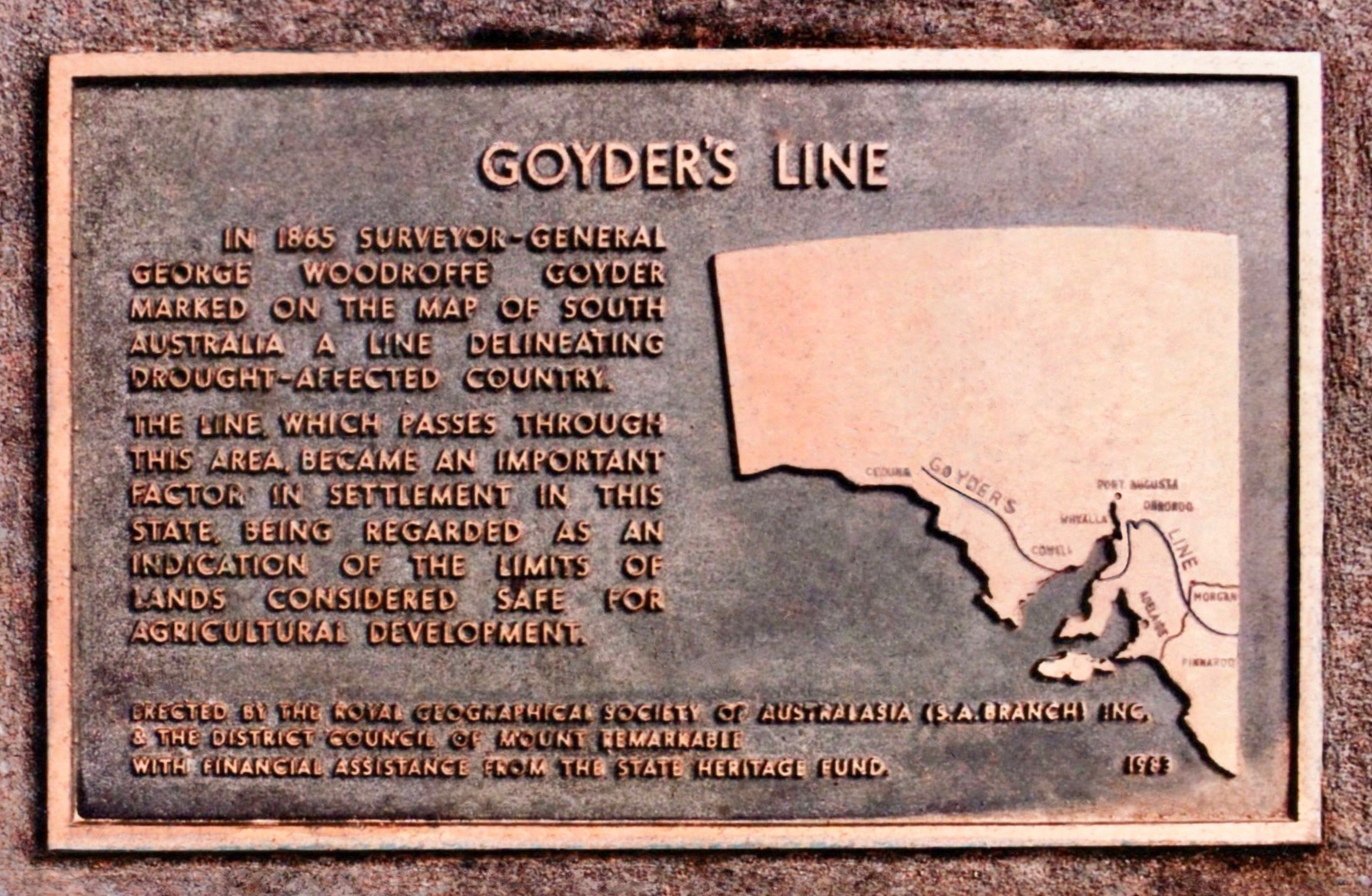
Plaque at Melrose, South Australia commemorating George Goyder's line of rainfall, which he determined when Surveyor-General. He correctly judged the rainfall in country inland of the line to be too unreliable for cereal growing.

Before the drought of the mid-1860s, wheat and barley growing had been spreading rapidly further north and the erroneous belief that rain would "follow the plough" led to the idea of cereal crops spreading up to the Northern Territory border.

However, the 1864–65 drought put paid, at least temporarily, to these ambitions. Goyder, in the midst of his work in the pastoral zone, was asked to report on the problem and his response was to find out how far south crop failure had been general. The furthest points inland at which crops had not failed, corresponding approximately to the 300-millimetre (12-inch) annual isohyet – figures vary from 250 to 350 millimetres in different publications – were marked as the "Line of Rainfall".

Goyder recommended that farmers should not attempt to grow cereal crops anywhere outside of the line. The idea was contrary to beliefs widespread at the time and seen by many as ridiculous in a period of great optimism, but after major losses by grain growers near to, or outside of, the line – especially in the droughts of 1881–1882 and 1884–1886 – his judgement proved to have been sound. The many major droughts in the 161 years since have confirmed his view.

Goyder's Line was first accepted significantly after a number of dry years, though improved cultivation practices have allowed some expansion in the 1980s and 1990s, despite a couple of very severe droughts.

=== Survey of Palmerston ===
Goyder was sent by the government of South Australia (of which the Northern Territory was then a part) to lay out the street plans for a capital to be named Palmerston. The site was chosen for its exceptionally good water supply and potential for easy communication with the rest of the continent through land or sea transportation. The site was chosen after Finniss's choice at Escape Cliffs had been rejected.

With the incentive of a £3000 bonus, "Little Energy" as he was nicknamed and his team of about 128 men left Port Adelaide on the Moonta on 27 December 1868 and dropped anchor in Darwin Harbour on 5 February 1869. He selected the site on Fort Point near Port Darwin, and nearby townships to be named Daly, Southport and Virginia. They completed all four sites in 18 months. Goyder returned on the Gulnare to Adelaide in November 1869 with about 30 men; the majority of his party returned in October 1870, though many (Dr Robert Peel, George MacLachlan, John Packard, Alfred and Frederick Schultze included) remained to fill duties in the town. Others, including Dan Daly and Paul Foelsche, were to return within a few years.

Goyder's expeditioners numbered about 100, most of whom are commemorated in the names of Darwin streets and outlying localities. (Note: Members of Goyder's expedition included: G. S. Aldridge, J. H. Aldridge, George A. Armstrong, Job Austin, W. Barlow, R. W. Barrow, Tom Bee, David L. Beetson, J. W. O. Bennett, Michael Bennett, Edwin S. Berry, Henry S. Bosworth, John Sherlock Brooking, Joseph Brooks, Philip H. Burden, William Collett, Daniel Dominick Daly, Henry Edwards, W. Fisher, Paul Foelsche, Michael Francis, J. W. Gepp, John Gerald, Christopher Giles, William Guy, W. Hardy, William Harvey, Richard Hinton, W(illiam) Webster Hoare (assistant to Dr Peel), W. Holland, Richard A. Horn, Thomas S. Horn, W. Howe, sen., C. N. Greene, George Hughes, George Kersley, S. King, R. R. Knuckey, J. M. Lambell, C. Laycock, J. Loudon, R. J. Loveday, A. L. McKay, George MacLachlan, Gilbert R. McMinn, A. E. Millar, C. Miller, W. W. Mills, A. J. Mitchell, W. Charles Musgrave, H. Nottage, H. D. Packard, John H. Packard, Dr R. Peel, G. Richards, J. Le M. F. Roberts, W. Rowe, Alfred Schultze, Frederick Schultze, A. H. Smith, E. M. Smith, C. Spencely, C. W. Sprigg, J. M. Thomas, Charles Frederick Wells, and A. T. Woods, and Ned and John Ryan (South Australian Government surveyors).)

Soon afterwards, the Overland Telegraph from England was landed at Palmerston via present-day Indonesia; it commenced operation in 1872. In 1911 Palmerston was renamed Darwin. About 1980, the name Palmerston was resurrected for Darwin's satellite city to the south.

== Personal life ==
He married Frances Mary Smith on 10 December 1851 at Christ Church, North Adelaide, and had nine children with her. Frances died on 8 April 1870 and George married her sister Ellen Priscilla Smith, who had been looking after the children, on 20 November 1871. With Ellen, George had three children, a son and twin daughters. Goyder led an austere and disciplined life, and this was reflected in his strict treatment of subordinates – though he was always regarded as fair to those he advised in spite of many complaints by farmers and graziers. By the late 1880s, however, Goyder's health was declining and, with no improvement in sight, he resigned the post of Surveyor-General at the end of 1893. He died at his home "Warrakilla", at Mylor near Aldgate in the Adelaide Hills, on 2 November 1898 and was buried in the Stirling District Cemetery.

== Legacy ==
Goyder Road in Darwin is named for him, and many others of the party are similarly honoured. Also named for him are a large river in Arnhem Land and electorates in both the Northern Territory and South Australia. Mount Woodroffe, the highest peak in South Australia at 1,435 metres (4,710 ft) is named after him (George Woodroffe Goyder)

Goyder's name has also been given to a species of grasswren Amytornis goyderi (Gould 1875), a district council, an electorate, the new pavilion at the Royal Adelaide Showgrounds, several streets, a park and the Goyder Institute for Water Research.

=== Named by Goyder ===
- Fannie Bay, Northern Territory
- Frances Bay, Northern Territory
- Mount Painter, South Australia, after the surveyor J.M. Painter, who was responsible for the trigonometric survey there in 1857

=== Named after Goyder ===
- Goyder's Line of rainfall
- Regional Council of Goyder
- Electoral district of Goyder, South Australia
- Electoral division of Goyder, Northern Territory
- Goyder Lagoon
- Goyder Channel
- Goyder crater
- Goyder Highway (State B64), South Australia
- Goyder River East Arnhemland, Northern Territory
- Goyder, South Australia, a locality
- Woodroffe, a suburb of Palmerston
- Mount Woodroffe, South Australia's highest peak

== See also ==
- Agriculture in Australia
- Moonta Herald
- Survey parties to the Northern Territory 1864–1870 Includes comprehensive lists of participants
