= Gilbert Rotherdale McMinn =

Gilbert McMinn
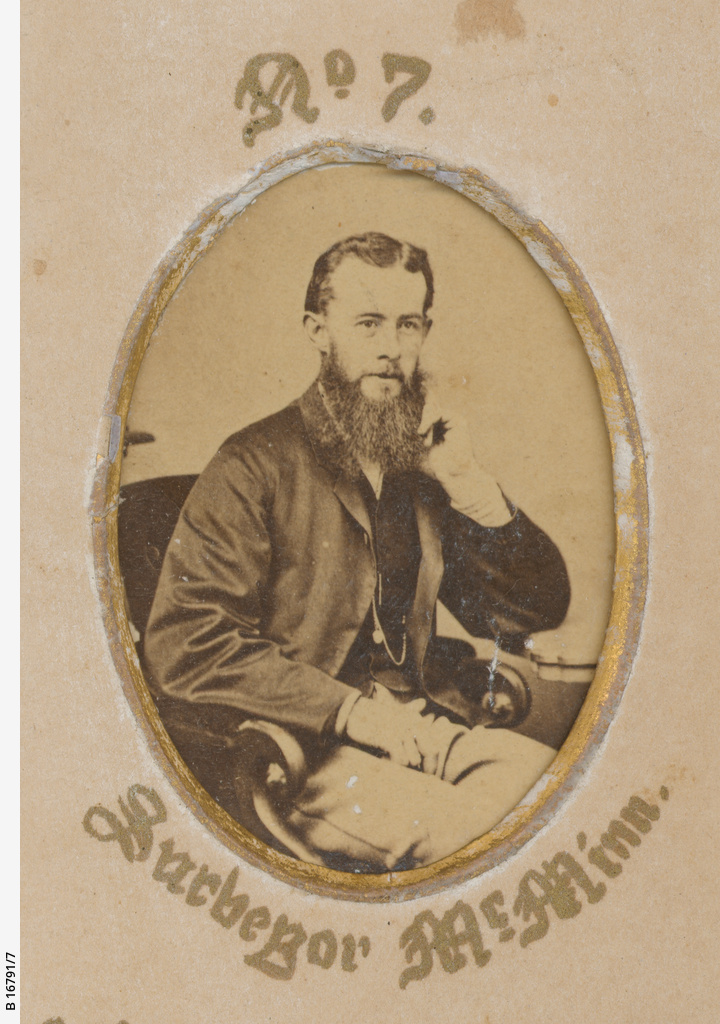
- Surveyor McMinn
- Born: Gilbert Rotherdale McMinn; 1841; Newry, County Down, Ireland
- Died: 18 October 1924 (aged 82–83); Melbourne, Victoria
- Occupations: Surveyor, public servant

Gilbert Rotherdale McMinn CE, SM, FRGS (1841 – 18 October 1924) was an Australian surveyor born in Ireland noted for his work in the Northern Territory surveying the Overland Telegraph Line. His middle name is occasionally spelt "Rutherdale".

== Early life ==
McMinn was born in Newry, County Down. He was the son of a bank manager, Joseph McMinn (c. 1794 – 6 April 1874) and his wife Martha, née Hamill or Hammill (c. 1805 – 13 December 1861), who sailed with their eight children aboard the Albatross and arrived at Port Adelaide in September 1850. Upon leaving school Gilbert took up surveying.

== Career ==
Gilbert McMinn was one of ten surveyors and a support crew of around 100 men, under Surveyor-General George Goyder and Dr. Robert Peel, who left Adelaide for Port Darwin shortly after Christmas 1868 to survey Palmerston and regions, and most of whom returned to Adelaide on 25 November 1869.

McMinn worked as a surveyor on the Overland Telegraph Line. In February 1871 he was the first European to visit Simpsons Gap, which he identified as a better route for the line.

He served in various senior public service positions in the Northern Territory. He was acting Administrator of the Northern Territory from March 1883 to March 1884.

== Later life and death ==
McMinn left Darwin for the east coast of Australia around 1890 and settled in Hawthorn, Victoria. He died in Mary Street, St. Kilda, Victoria on 18 October 1924 after a sudden heart failure at the age of 83.

== Recognition ==
- McMinn Street, a major thoroughfare in Darwin on the edge of the city, leading to the Stokes Hill Wharf, is named after him.
- Rothdale Road, Casuarina, Northern Territory was (mis)named for him.

== Family ==
On 28 November 1874 in Port Darwin, McMinn married his first wife, Anna Gore. Anna is buried in Palmerston (Darwin) Pioneer Cemetery also called Goyder Road cemetery. Her date of death is listed as 25 December 1880, aged 27 years. Her headstone also mentions their son "Willie" who died 10 March 1878, aged 7 months.

He married again on 15 November 1884 to Madge Fleetwood-Marsh. He had three sons and two daughters.

Among their children were:

- Mary McMinn, married Alfred Turner Fry of Kapunda on 21 July 1913 Alfred was a son of Rev. Alfred George Fry, who officiated at the wedding.
- Gilbert Rotherdale McMinn, married Elizabeth Elsie Taylor of Middle Park, Victoria on 7 July 1915. He was postmaster at Hawthorn West.
- Walter Driffield McMinn (16 July 1892 – ?) born in Hawthorn was injured during World War I.
- Beulah Rotherdale McMinn was engaged to Major Edmund Frank Lind, DADMS in 1918. She served as a nurse in France during WWI.

Two of McMinn's brothers also worked as surveyors on the Overland Telegraph Line:

- William McMinn, who later became a well-known Adelaide architect.
- Joseph McMinn (c.1846–9 February 1888), who married Charlotte Isabella "Chatty" Wells (1856– ) of Penola.

== Publications ==
- G. R. McMinn. "Abridged report on the Northern Territory of South Australia, Melbourne 1902". National Library of Australia.
