= Djerimanga =

Indigenous Australian people of the Northern Territory

Djerimanga people
- Wulna, Woolna, Woolner, Wuna
- Photograph of Liallon, a Djerimanga man, taken in 1880 by Paul Foelsche

Language
- Language family: Darwin Region languages

Country
- Region: Adelaide River
- Location: Northern Territory

The Djerimanga (also known as the Wulna, Woolna, Wuna or Woolner) are an Indigenous Australian people of the Northern Territory.

== Country ==
Wulna country consisted of some 1,200 square miles (3,100 km^{2}) on the coastal plain where the lower Adelaide River opens into the Timor Sea. The northern boundary was the tip of Cape Hotham, west to Gunn Point and Knuckey Lagoon, and south to Manton Dam including the Acacia Aboriginal Community. Their country extended eastwards as far as the Mary River floodplains. Humpty Doo Station, Koolpinyah Station, Woolner Station, Marrakai Station and Djukbinj National Park are also situated within these traditional boundaries. Historically, the Wulna had a southern inland extension of their land as far as the Margaret River and the Ringwood Range, but lost it to the eastern Djowei.

== Alternative names ==
- Djeramanga
- Wulna, Woolna, Woolnah, Woolner, Wulnar, Wuna, Wolna

== Language and culture ==
The Djerimanga spoke Wulna (Wuna) an Indigenous language that is now extinct. John W. O. Bennett managed to compile a brief vocabulary of their language in 1869. The last speaker of Wulna was Jack Wandi who died in the 1980s.

Before British colonisation, the Djerimanga built well-thatched wet season huts and occasionally wore capes and skirts made of woven coarse grass. The men also adorned themselves with long wooden piercings placed through perforations made below the cartilage of the nasal septum. The Djerimanga manufactured bark canoes up to fifteen feet in length and also bottle-shaped baskets to hold ochre pigments.

Upon reaching adulthood, both male and female Djerimanga had two upper incisor teeth ceremoniously removed.

== History ==
=== Early contact with Europeans ===
The Djerimanga seem to have had only very limited or no contact with the Dutch and the Makassans who interacted more regularly with other Indigenous peoples of northern coastal Australia. The first documented contact with non-Aboriginal foreigners was in 1839 when the British vessel HMS Beagle arrived at Cape Hotham under the command of John Clements Wickham and John Lort Stokes.

Sketch of Mr Fitzmaurice and Mr Keys of HMS Beagle performing a dance while fleeing armed Djerimanga at Escape Cliffs in 1839

These expeditioners named the Adelaide River (known to the Djerimanga as Windindin) and also Escape Cliffs (originally called Patter purrer). Escape Cliffs received its name after two crew members of the Beagle were able to escape from a group of armed Djerimanga men at the location by distracting them with a dance.

=== Attempt at colonisation by the British ===
In 1864, a group of British colonists under the leadership of Boyle Travers Finniss arrived to establish settlements at Escape Cliffs and along the Adelaide River. The Djerimanga resisted this incursion by continually raiding the stores of the British. Finniss ordered Frederick Litchfield to retrieve these stores from the Djerimanga. A skirmish ensued where at least two Djerimanga were shot dead, while Litchfield and another colonist were injured by spears. The British medical officer conducted a crude autopsy on one the dead Djerimanga, removing the bullet from the skull with a hammer and chisel. The man who shot this victim dead, Alaric Ward, was later killed in revenge by the Djerimanga who smashed his arms and head in with stone axes.

Finniss reacted to this skirmish by building barricades around Escape Cliffs, augmented by the placement of several cannons. When the Djerimanga speared a number of horses outside the barricades, Finniss declared war on the Djerimanga and organised a punitive expedition to clear the area of "natives" and "to shoot every bloody native" they saw. The armed party came across a Djerimanga camp on the shores of Chambers Bay. The occupants fled as the British started shooting. One elder, named Dombey, was taken prisoner and then shot in the abdomen. He was later shot dead by a bullet to the head. The perpetrators of this killing of a prisoner (W.P. Auld, Stephen Chandler and William Dougall) were later tried for murder in Adelaide but were acquitted.

The Djerimanga were not seen again by the British at Escape Cliffs for eight months after the punitive expedition. However, upon their return, Finniss reinforced the barricades and established a constabulary of seven men led by Litchfield.

Finniss was recalled to Adelaide in early 1866 and James Thomas Manton took over command at Escape Cliffs. Almost immediately, a better relationship was formed between the colonists and the Djerimanga. Flour, sugar and clothing was exchanged by the British for fresh fish, crabs and eggs. Around 200 Djerimanga made camp just outside the settlement. A Djerimanga elder named Mira was central to this improvement in relations. Through him, Djerimanga guides were provided for the colonists and a vocabulary of the Wulna language was collated. John W. O. Bennett was able to publish both a detailed map of the region and a Wulna-English phrasebook based upon the derived information.

In January 1867, the British abandoned Escape Cliffs. Mira and the local group of Djerimanga became caretakers of the vacated settlement in the hope that Manton and the productive trading relationship would return. However, the British never re-established the settlement and in 1869 the Djerimanga also left the Escape Cliffs outpost.

=== Interactions with the Port Darwin settlement ===
In March 1869, George Goyder arrived with around 120 colonists at Port Darwin in another British attempt to establish a settlement on the northern Australian coast, which this time was ultimately successful. The local Larrakia people were mostly friendly to the arrival of the colonists, and when the neighbouring Djerimanga heard of Goyder's establishment, elders such as Mira travelled to Port Darwin to make contact with the British. Mira was a regular visitor to Goyder's camp where he acted as a mediator and peacemaker.

Mira's influence was important when John W.O. Bennett was speared to death in May 1869 by Djerimanga at Fred's Pass. Mira was helpful in persuading Goyder not to take any retaliatory action against the Djerimanga. However, the Djerimanga were now considered a "hostile" people, and when Goyder was replaced in early 1870 by the acting Government Resident, James Stokes Millner, a police force under Sub-Inspector Paul Foelsche came with him to protect the settlement at Port Darwin.

In April 1870, around 200 Djerimanga came to Palmerston (as Darwin was then called) demanding food and women from the British. After a local Larrakia man Orunga was killed by Djerimanga in a fight, they requested the British to help them force the Djerimanga away. Millner ordered a punitive expedition which caused the Djerimanga contingent to retreat back to country.

When the new Government Resident, William Bloomfield Douglas arrived in July 1870, he visited Escape Cliffs on Wulna country and met with the Djerimanga advising them they were welcome in Palmerston if they were peaceful. After this meeting, the Djerimanga were frequent, mostly amicable visitors to the British settlement, although traditional fights with the Larrakia continued on occasions and there was also an attempt to spear Douglas when his visited their camp in 1872. "Scotchman", the name given to the Djerimanga man who attempted to spear Douglas, was later speared to death himself in a dispute with the Larrakia in 1879. Those arrested for his killing were acquitted in a colonial court.

The Djerimanga (or the Woolner tribe as they become known to the colonists) set up a semi-permanent camp in Palmerston and some were also swayed to attend a Jesuit mission to the Aborigines established in the suburb of Rapid Creek. The mission, named St Joseph's, lasted from 1882 until 1888 and only one Aboriginal adult, a Djerimanga man, was baptised there. The mission shut after a huge fight occurred between the resident Djerimanga, Larrakia and Alligator Rivers people.

In 1891, Inspector Foelsche conducted a mass arrest of Djerimanga at their Palmerston camp and confiscated all their possessions. The colonists wanted the "niggers" out of the Palmerston region and subsequently in 1892, reserves for the Larrakia and Djerimanga were alloted around the Adelaide River. However, many Djerimanga continued to live in Palmerston where prostitution, disease, poverty, violence, child removals and alcohol reduced their numbers considerably by 1898.

=== Djerimanga country taken over by pastoral leases ===
While some Djerimanga remained in Palmerston, others lived on country at the Woolner Aboriginal Reserve east of the Adelaide River along Chambers Bay. In 1908 and 1910, Oscar Herbert (the son of the Government Resident Charles Edward Herbert) in conjunction with his brother Evan and another colonist named George H. Sunter were permitted to take up two enormous pastoral leases that covered much of the original Djerimanga country. They named these leases Koolpinyah and Humpty Doo. According to Sunter, who wrote books on his time at Koolpinyah, the Djerimanga were utilised as cheap labour on these properties. Around this time the Woolner Aboriginal Reserve also became defunct and was integrated into the Woolner pastoral lease. Most of the business conducted on these leases involved raising cattle and the shooting of feral water buffalo for sport, hides and meat.

The Djerimanga and their descendants continued to labour as "station blacks" at Koolpinyah and Humpty Doo under the reign of the Herbert brothers until at least the 1950s. Aboriginal workers were present at Woolner Station until at least 1966. Under the pressures of colonisation, the Djerimanga and the neighbouring Limilngan (Minitja) people to the east became closely associated and their descendants also became labourers on the nearby Marrakai pastoral lease originally taken up by Maurice Lyons and Charles Fisher.

== Djerimanga in the modern day ==
The Djerimanga (Wulna), the Limilngan (Minitja) and the Uwinymil people in the modern age have effectively merged as a group with similar principles and interdependence in respect of hunting, ceremony and other social interactions, although each still has independently recognised descent lineages.

In 2021, a combined legal claim by these groups for land rights over coastal and riverine areas around Chambers Bay was successful.

The Darwin suburb of Woolner is named after the colonial term for the Djerimanga people.

== See also ==
- Wulna language

== Sources ==
- Basedow, Herbert (1907). "Anthropological notes on the Western Coastal tribes of the Northern Territory of South Australia". Transactions of the Royal Society of South Australia. 31: 1–62.
- Bennett, John W. O. (1869). Vocabulary of the Woolner District Dialect, Adelaide River, Northern Territory. Adelaide: W.C. Cox.
- Eylmann, Erhard (1908). Die Eingeborenen der Kolonie Südaustralien (PDF). Berlin: Dietrich Reimer.
- Ford, Lysbeth Julie (1998). A description of the Emmi language of the Northern Territory of Australia (PDF) (Doctoral thesis). Australian National University.
- Pugh, Derek (2018). Escape Cliffs: The first Northern Territory expedition 1864-66. Darwin: Derek Pugh. ISBN 9780648142102.
- Reid, Gordon (1990). A Picnic With the Natives: Aboriginal-European relations in the Northern Territory to 1910. Melbourne: Melbourne University Press. ISBN 0522844197.
- Stokes, John Lort (1846). Discoveries in Australia Vol. 1. London: T & W Boone.
- Tindale, Norman Barnett (1974). "Djerimanga (NT)". Aboriginal Tribes of Australia: Their Terrain, Environmental Controls, Distribution, Limits, and Proper Names. Australian National University. Archived from the original on 20 March 2020.
- "Wulna". Ethnologue.
