= Languages of Australia =

- Official: None at federal level
- Main: English
- Indigenous: 120 to 170 Indigenous Australian languages and dialects
- Vernacular: Australian English, Australian Aboriginal English
- Minority: Over 300
- Signed: Auslan and several others

The languages of Australia are the major historic and current languages used in Australia and its offshore islands. Over 250 Australian Aboriginal languages are thought to have existed at the time of first European contact. English is the majority language of Australia today. It is the language used in education and government. Although English has no official legal status, it is the de facto official and national language. Australian English is a major variety of the language with a distinctive accent and lexicon, and differs slightly from other varieties of English in grammar and spelling.

Around 120 to 170 Indigenous languages and dialects are spoken today, but many of these are endangered. Creole languages such as Kriol and Yumplatok (Torres Strait Creole) are the most widely-spoken Indigenous languages. Other distinctively Australian languages include the Australian sign language Auslan, Indigenous sign languages, and Norf'k-Pitcairn, spoken mostly on Norfolk Island.

Major waves of immigration following the Second World War and in the 21st century considerably increased the number of community languages spoken in Australia. In 2021, 5.8 million people used a language other than English at home. The most common of these languages were Mandarin, Arabic, Vietnamese, Cantonese, Punjabi, Greek, Italian and Hindi.

== English ==
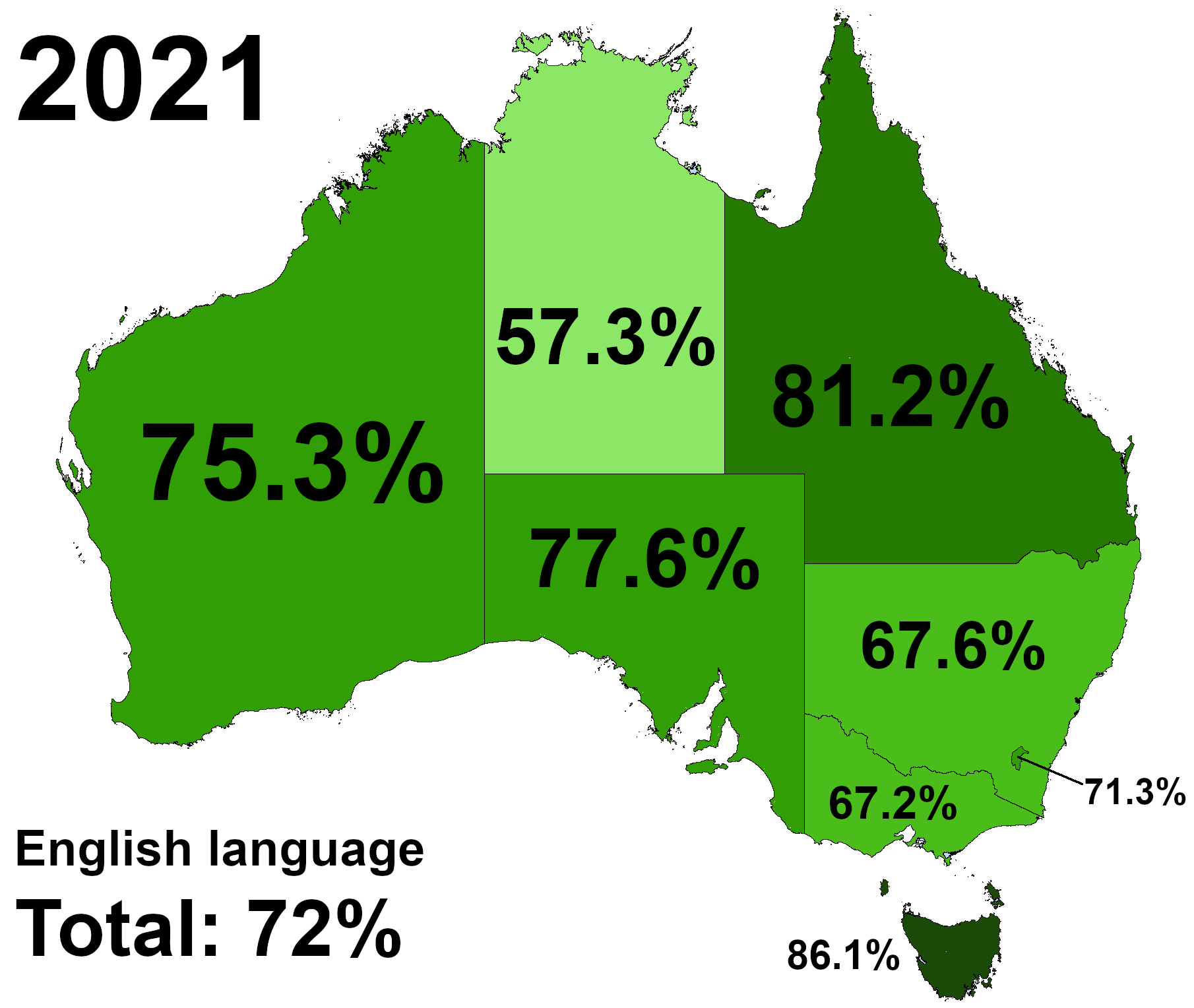
Population who speaks only English at home in 2021

English was introduced into Australia on British settlement in 1788 and in the following decades gradually overtook Indigenous languages to become the majority language of Australia. Although English is not the official language of Australia in law, it is the de facto official and national language. It is the most widely spoken language in the country, and is used as the only language in the home by 72% of the population. The increase in the migrant population of Australia in the decade after 2011 saw a decline in the number of people speaking only English at home.

Percentage of population speaking only English at home: 2011, 2016 and 2021
State/territory	2011	2016	2021
New South Wales	72.5	68.5	67.6
Victoria	72.4	67.9	67.2
Queensland	84.8	81.2	81.2
South Australia	81.6	78.2	77.6
Western Australia	79.3	75.2	75.3
Tasmania	91.7	88.3	86.1
Northern Territory	62.8	58.0	57.3
Australian Capital Territory	77.8	72.7	71.3
Australia	76.8	72.7	72.0

Australian English is a major variety of the language with a distinctive accent and lexicon, and differs slightly from other varieties of English in grammar and spelling. General Australian serves as the standard dialect.

== Aboriginal and Torres Strait Island languages ==
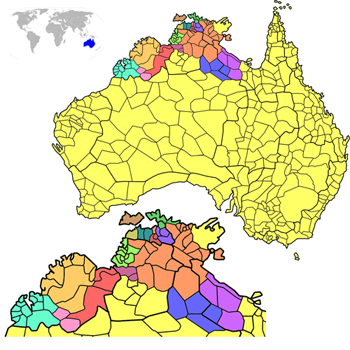
Colour-coded linguistic map of Australia's indigenous language families. Most of the native languages are grouped in the Pama–Nyungan family (yellow). Legend Pama–Nyungan Bunaban Wororan Garawa Giimbiyu Gunwinyguan Daly Djamindjungan Djeragan Yiwaidjan Laragiya Limilngan Nyulnyulan Tiwi Umbugarla West Barkly

Humans arrived in Australia 50,000 to 65,000 years ago but it is possible that the ancestor language of existing Indigenous languages is as recent as 12,000 years old. Over 250 Australian Aboriginal languages are thought to have existed at the time of first European contact. The National Indigenous Languages Survey (NILS) for 2018–19 found that more than 120 Indigenous language varieties were in use or being revived, although 70 of those in use are endangered. The 2021 census found that 167 Indigenous languages were spoken at home by 76,978 Indigenous Australians. NILS and the Australian Bureau of Statistics use different classifications for Indigenous Australian languages.

According to the 2021 census, the classifiable Aboriginal and Torres Strait Island languages with the most speakers are Yumplatok (Torres Strait Creole) (7,596 speakers), Kriol (7,403), Djambarrpuyngu (3,839), Pitjantjatjara (3,399), Warlpiri (2,592), Murrinh Patha (2,063) and Tiwi (2,053). There were also over 10,000 people who spoke an Indigenous language which could not be further defined or classified.

=== Torres Strait Island languages ===
Three languages are spoken on the islands of the Torres Strait, within Australian territory, by the Melanesian inhabitants of the area: Yumplatok (Torres Strait Creole) (7,596 speakers used the language at home in 2021), Kalaw Lagaw Ya (875 speakers) and Meriam Mir (256 speakers). Meriam Mir is a Papuan language, while Kalaw Lagaw Ya is an Australian language.

=== Creoles ===
A number of English-based creoles have arisen in Australia after European contact, of which Kriol and Yumplatok (Torres Strait Creole) are among the strongest and fastest-growing Indigenous languages. Kriol is spoken in the Northern Territory and Western Australia, and Torres Strait Creole in Queensland and south-west Papua. It is estimated that there are 20,000 to 30,000 speakers of Indigenous creole languages.

=== Tasmanian languages ===
Before British colonisation, there were perhaps five to sixteen languages on Tasmania, possibly related to one another in four language families. The last speaker of a traditional Tasmanian language, Fanny Cochrane Smith, died in 1905. Palawa kani is an in-progress constructed language, built from a composite of surviving words from various Tasmanian Aboriginal languages.

=== Indigenous sign languages ===
Traditional Indigenous languages often incorporated sign systems to aid communication with the hearing impaired, to complement verbal communication, and to replace verbal communication when the spoken language was forbidden for cultural reasons. Many of these sign systems are still in use.

== Other languages ==
=== Sign languages ===
The Australian sign language Auslan was used at home by 16,242 people at the time of the 2021 census. Over 2,000 people used other sign languages at home in 2021. There is a small community of people who use Australian Irish Sign Language.

=== External territories languages ===
Norf'k-Pitcairn, a creole of 18th century English and Tahitian, was introduced to Norfolk Island by Pitcairn settlers after 1856. In 2021, it was used at home by 907 people, mostly on Norfolk Island. Cocos Malay, a Malay-based creole, is spoken by around 700 people on the Cocos (Keeling) and Christmas islands.

=== Other spoken languages ===
The proportion of Australians speaking a language other than English increased after the Second World War due to the immigration of refugees and displaced persons from European countries. In the 21st century, there was another sharp increase in immigration, especially from Asia. In 2021, 5.8 million people (22.8% of the population) reported using a language other than English at home. The ten most common of these were: Mandarin (2.7% of census respondents), Arabic (1.4%), Vietnamese (1.3%), Cantonese (1.2%), Punjabi (0.9%), Greek (0.9%), Italian (0.9%), Hindi (0.8%), Spanish (0.7%) and Nepali (0.5%).

== Language education ==
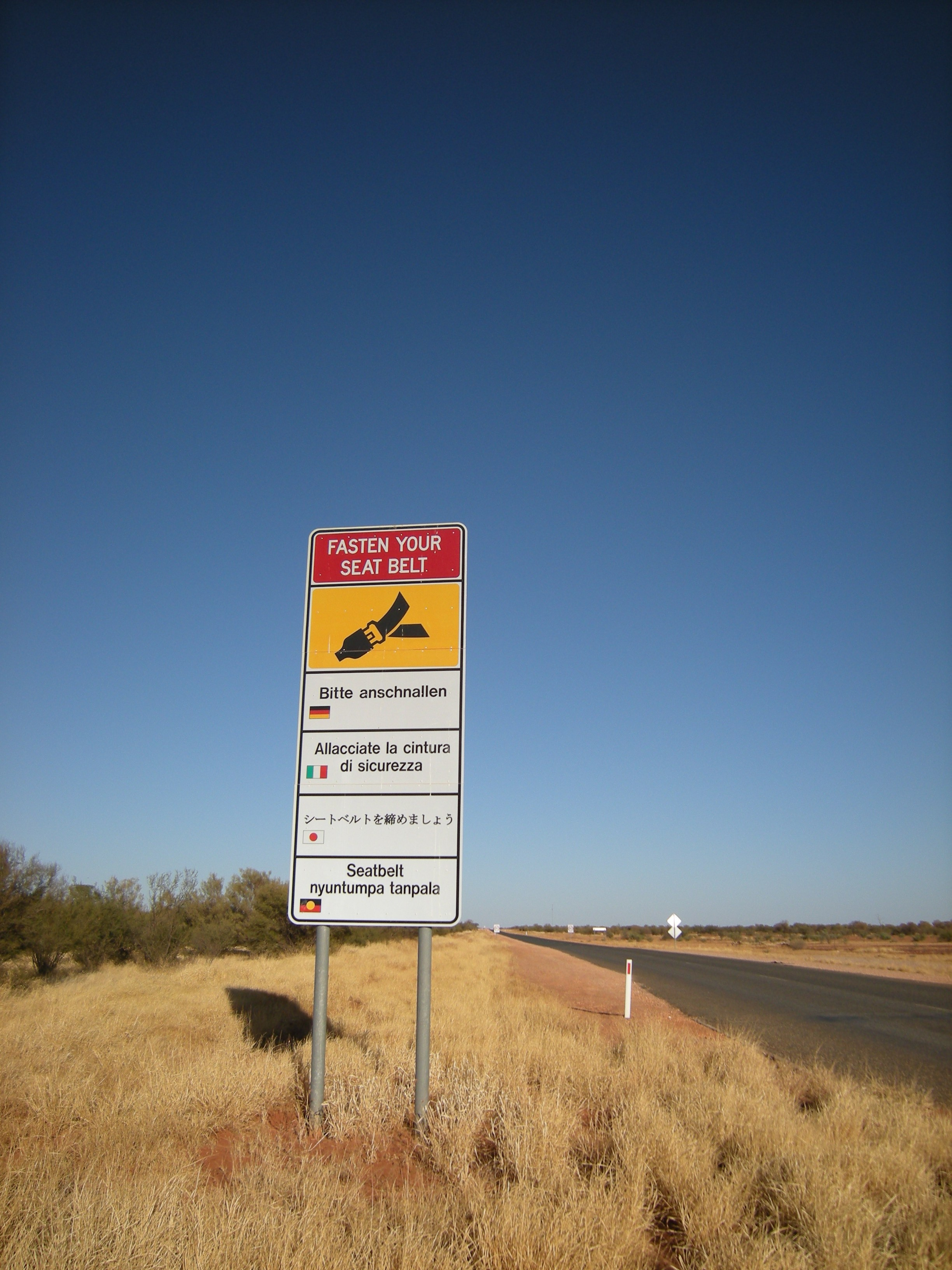
Road sign in English, German, Italian, Japanese and Pitjantjatjara

English is the language of school education in Australia and is a key learning area in the Australian curriculum up to Year 10. Languages are also a key learning area up to Year 10 and include Arabic, Auslan, Chinese, French, German, Hindi, Indonesian, Italian, Japanese, Korean, Modern Greek, Spanish, Turkish and Vietnamese, as well as the Framework for Aboriginal and Torres Strait Islander Languages, and Framework for Classical Languages including Classical Greek and Latin. Year 12 enrolments in Languages Other than English declined over the 10 years to 2021 and are the lowest of all subject areas.

There are a number of Indigenous language programs inside and outside the school system. The Australian Government has committed $14.1 million over the four years to 2025–2026 to teach First Nations languages in primary schools across Australia. There are also 20 Indigenous Language Centres across Australia which receive funding from the Australian Government and other sources.

Australia is a significant destination for overseas students studying English. Over 79,000 overseas students enrolled in intensive English courses in Australia in 2022. This was below the pre-COVID-19 peak of 156,478 enrolments in 2019.

== Languages in Parliament ==
Although English is the primary language used for addressing any legislature in Australia, due to Australia's multiculturalism, many politicians have used other languages in parliamentary speeches.

=== Federal ===
In 2016, Prime Minister Malcolm Turnbull spoke Ngunnawal in a parliamentary speech, becoming the first prime minister to use an Indigenous language in Parliament.

In 1988, Trish Crossin became the first senator to give a maiden speech in an Indigenous language, speaking in Gumatj, a Yolŋu dialect.

In 1999, Aden Ridgeway introduced himself to the Senate in Gumbaynggirr.

In 2008, Rob Oakeshott became the first politician to use an Indigenous language in the House of Representatives, after he used three Dhanggati words in his speech. In June 2013, he became the first politician to give a speech to any Australian parliament entirely in an Indigenous language, after giving a speech in Dhanggati with help from a linguist.

In August 2016, Linda Burney gave an Acknowledgement of Country in Wiradjuri.

In 2016, Senator Pat Dodson spoke Yawuru in the Senate, with the Senate President even responding in Yawuru.

In 2016, Senator Malarndirri McCarthy gave an Acknowledgement of Country in Yanyuwa.

In 2022, two MPs spoke both English and French in their maiden speeches: Jerome Laxale and Zoe McKenzie, both of whom are of French background. In the same year, Sam Lim used three languages in his maiden speech: Malay, Mandarin and English (in that order).

=== New South Wales ===
The first politician to use an Indigenous language in the Parliament of New South Wales was Troy Grant in 2014, who used Wiradjuri in the closing sentence of the Acknowledgement of Country.

In 2019, Sarah Mitchell gave an Acknowledgment of Country in English, which was translated into Dhanggati.

=== Northern Territory ===
In 1981, Neil Bell became the first politician to use an Indigenous language in a maiden speech to the Northern Territory Legislative Assembly, speaking in Pitjantjatjara.

In 2008, Alison Anderson spoke in the Western Desert language during her first speech as Minister for Natural Resources, Environment and Heritage.

In 2012, Bess Price spoke Warlpiri in her maiden speech. In the same sitting of parliament, Yingiya Mark Guyula spoke Yolŋu in his maiden speech.

=== Queensland ===
In 2018, Cynthia Lui became the first politician to address an Australian parliament in a Torres Strait Islander language, addressing the Queensland Legislative Assembly in Kala Lagaw Ya.

=== Western Australia ===
Josie Farrer was the first politician to use an Indigenous language in the Parliament of Western Australia, speaking in both Kija and Kriol.

== See also ==
- Diminutives in Australian English
