= Limilngan language =

Extinct Aboriginal Australian language

Limilngan
- Limil, Manadja, Minitji
- Native to: Australia
- Region: Arnhem Land, Northern Territory
- Ethnicity: Limilngan (aka Buneidja)
- Extinct: 2009
- Language family: Darwin Region: Limilngan languages; Limilngan

Language codes
- ISO 639-3: lmc
- Glottolog: nucl1327
- AIATSIS: N42
- ELP: Limilngan

Limilngan, also known as Limil and Manidja (also spelt Manitja), is an extinct Aboriginal Australian language of the Top End of Australia.

== Names and ownership ==
The language as well as its speakers are known by three names: Limilngan, Limil and Manidja / Manitja, the latter being an exonym.

Buneidja is regarded as the same language, and the people are sometimes referred to by this name.

== Traditional lands ==
Limilngan was spoken in the Darwin hinterland, in the Mary River (Northern Territory) area of Kakadu.

== Phonology ==
Consonant sounds
	Peripheral		Laminal	Apical	
	Labial	Velar	Palatal	Alveolar	Retroflex
Stop	b/p	ɡ/k	ɟ/c	d/t	ɖ/ʈ
Nasal	m	ŋ	ɲ	n	ɳ
Lateral			ʎ	l	ɭ
Rhotic				ɾ	
Approximant	w		j		ɻ

The Limilngan language uses the three vowel system; /a/, /i/, /u/. The three sounds can result in allophones as [ɑ, æ], [ɪ], and [ʊ].

== Vocabulary ==
Limilngan plant and animal names:

=== Animals ===
English gloss	Limilngan
animal	lulayi
bandicoot	urugalitjbagi
cattle	bulikgi
dingo	dimarrkginyan
dog	ngiliyi
dugong	anmat dumuligan
echidna	mumuligan mamban
flying fox (black)	mumalingan
flying fox (red)	lumarninyan damban
horse	nandu
kangaroo	anmat dumuligan
mouse	liyil
native cat	dirdatj
native cat	gitjbi damban
old man kangaroo	madlingi minyayan
possum	lulikbi dinyayan
sugar glider	marnijurrkgurrk
tree rat	luwarli
wallaby (agile)	bungal minyayan
wallaby (short-eared rock)	itbilinyngan
wallaroo (black)	lunybim
black-headed python	iwirli
black whipsnake	lamurr
blue tongue lizard	mimiluk minyayan
Burton's legless lizard	laminy dagiyan
carpet snake	irrun damban
crocodile	latdinyayan
death adder	iyatdururr
file snake	bitjjurnurnu
freshwater crocodile	linan dirrinyan
frill-necked lizard	lam
goanna sp.	mirtbinalk mamban
goanna sp.	birnirriny
goanna	limiji damban
golden tree snake	lagun
keelback snake	limin biyal
king brown snake	alinyman dinyayan
lizard sp.	badambip
lizard sp.	lanay
lizard sp.	liminalk
lizard sp.	minyim binyayan
long-necked turtle	lulayk
MacLeay's water snake (Pseudoferania polylepis)	layi
olive python	lumuwat dumuligan
short-necked turtle	lamuk dikbugan
skink	imin mirlarli
slaty-grey snake (Stegonotus cucullatus)	lambirli
turtle leg	milingbi
water goanna	ngugun dagiyan
water snake	lambugay
western brown snake	iyaturu
bird sp.	jitbulkbulk
bird sp.	luwutjgi
bittern	nawarral
black cockatoo	lurrilmal
black kite	limin binal
brolga	lurrilyarr
bustard	dumugarnyi
butcherbird	minbulungbulung
comb-crested jacana	liyiny
cormorant (large species)	lumuwulkbarl
crow	lagurr
curlew	girriluk ~ limiluk
darter	iminy
dove	guluduk
eagle (white-bellied sea)	imbinyman
eagle (wedge-tailed)	malungan
egg	umunngayan
egret	lurliny
emu	langitj
feather	lumulkban
flycatcher	wijit
galah	bilarrkbilarrk
goose	lamay
jabiru	larryal
jungle fowl	larnmingi dinyayan
kookaburra	lirrgi
long-tailed finch	mawitjbitj
magpie	jilalarr
magpie-lark	liwitjbut
masked lapwing	barrapbarrap
mopoke	gumitgumitgan
native hen	bibarrk
owl	mukmuk ilamirl
parrot (red-winged)	miyilarrk
pelican	marninyi mambirri
pheasant	mambarr birrinyan
pigeon (Torresian imperial)	lalkgi
plover	gurlawirtwirt
pygmy goose	laliny
quail	ligi
rainbow bee-eater	malarr
tern	larnung dirrinyngan ~ liwirarr dinyayan
whistling duck (plumed)	laminyanbarr
whistling duck (wandering)	danyarnngi
whistling kite	limarrambi
white cockatoo	ditjgan
white-throated grasswren	lamugarn
willy wagtail	jigirritj-jigirritj
wing	larnung
barramundi	diyan diminyan
black bream	luwitjbarl
catfish	gurdumardi
crab	makbangi dinyayan
crab	makbangi majan
eel	imilung dajan
fish	iwan
frog sp.	bagartbagart
garfish	jukjuk ilamirl
longbam	wugul-wugul
mangrove oyster	ulikbily
manta ray	langinyngan
mermaid	marung
mullet	ilyiwin muluman
mussel	liyinmungi
oyster	lumbangmam
prawn	lilkgany
sea snake	umalikgan
shark	arli
shellfish sp.	galpbangarruk
stingray	mumburarr
ant sp.	darnman
anthill	ayirri
blowfly	luwunbun
bull ant	luralkgalk
butterfly	mambirri
centipede	lurluk
dragon fly	liwijul
flea	manum birrinyan
fly	lalykgi
green ant	girralpbung
grub	limiyuk
hornet	uwurnitj
leech	lugi
little fly	luwutjgi
louse	limbi
louse egg	miyimbi
mangrove worm	dirrinyngangan
marchfly	lalk
mosquito	lanbayk
sandfly	mimilanitj
scorpion	lurngun
snail	lirrul
tick	mirtbinalk
wasp	malinyngan

=== Plants ===
English gloss	Limilngan
bamboo	mirnalitj
Banksia dentata	mambirram
banyon	minukban
billy goat plum	layi
black currant tree	manguk
black plum	miminikgitj
black wattle	iwirli
bush onion	lagurr
bush potato	bawitj
crab's eye vine	bakgarl
cycad	uwarrkbi
flower	mimilngan
grass	marniyi
grass (knife)	barram
green plum	ilidamban
Grewia retusifolia	magangurl
Haemodorum coccineum	wilwil ilam
ironwood	marral
ironwood wax	nguwuk
leaf	luwutjgi
lily (grass)	minumbirr
lily (red)	uwukgi damban
lily bulb (white)	minayuk
lily flower (white)	manyal
lily stem (white)	ulikbily
lily tuber (white)	mingililuk
dense tree cover	miyimil
milkwood	mimilugutj
palm species	dilimin langan
palm species	mulpbay
pandanus nut	langitj
Pandanus spiralis	liyarr
paperbark	agal
Persoonia falcata	latjji
Phragmites	lamitj
pig tucker tree	laliny
red apple	mamun birritj ~ mamun burrnginy
root	madlingi
scrub	lalagan
seaweed	malngi
stringybark	linngulitj
tea tree (Note: There are several plants called tea tree, and it is unclear which this one was.)	agi-agi
tree	bangi
unidentified plant species	miyingal
white apple	lalykgi damban
white cedar	liwirnal
white gum	limin balyi
wild banana	langinyngan
wild peanut tree	imiligarnmi
woollybutt	muwurn ditjgan
yam (long)	limbi
yam (round)	mirnngayal
yam (water)	darndamban
