= Limilngan =

Aboriginal Australian people of the Northern Territory

The Limilngan, also known by the exonym Minitja and (based on a language dialect) Buneidja, are an Aboriginal Australian people of the Northern Territory. Earlier ethnologists such as Norman Tindale referred to the group as Puneitja or variants of that spelling.

== Language ==
Limilngan, now extinct, was spoken by the people of that name, who are also referred to as Limil and Minitjja (Note: 'People who had or have extensive life history contacts with Limilngan language owners usually refer to them as Minitjja. All earlier European references to the language and its owners are under some variant of this name. As such, Minitjja appears to have been a term for Limilngan used by people owning other languages.' (Harvey 2001, p. 3)) (Manidja/Manitja), the latter being an exonym. Buneidja is regarded as the same language, and the people are sometimes referred to by this name.

== Country ==
The Limilngan/Puneitja were one of several native groups to the east of Darwin. To their northeast were Ngardok, to the east the Ngomburr. On the southern boundary lay the Uwinymil. The Warray ranged to their southwest. To their northwest lay the Djerimanga/Wuna. Their land lies on the lower Mary River area between Buluwurrk (Mt Bundey) and the coast around Gunanyjarr (Point Stuart).

In Tindale's calculations, the Puneitja's territorial lands covered some 900 square miles (2,300 km^{2}) on the western side of the South Alligator River, running approximately 50 miles inland and along Coirwong Creek. Ronald and Catherine Berndt also placed them at the headwaters of the East Alligator River, a view queried by Tindale, who thought this located them beyond their eastern boundaries.

The area is now in Kakadu National Park, and the people are part of a group to whom native title was granted in March 2022.

== History ==
After the settlement of Darwin in 1869, the indigenous peoples, including the Limilngan, who inhabited its hinterland – the territory generally known as "buffalo country" extending from the coast southwards to Oenpelli (present-day Gunbalanya)- suffered drastically from the powerful transformations of their landscape, with a dramatic population collapse which by 1920 is calculated to have reduced the population by some 95%. Disease contracted by contact with white colonialists accounted for most of the decimation, though murders and massacres also played a role.

== Dreamtime origin ==
In the dreamtime legends of this area, a woman, Imberombera, and a man, Wuraka, are foundational figures. They came to the mainland separately by walking southwards across the sea, and Imberombera landed at Malay Bay (Wungaran). Both originally spoke Iwaidja. She encountered Wuraka and wished him to accompany her, but Wuraka, tired by the burden of his heavy penis, which he carried slung over his shoulder, demurred. Imerombera pressed on, heavily pregnant, and on her journey, left spirit children at various points, together with yams, or Cyprus bulbs or bamboo, and chanted the language to be spoken in each area. In what became Puneitja ground, she said: Puneitja ngeinyimma tjikaru, gnoro Jaijipali, the first word indicating the language.

In a specific Limilngan creation narrative n down from the words of one of the last speakers of the language, Felix Holmes, a journey from east to west is undertaken by a creator being, an old man called Wanyjuwanyjuwa, together with three mermaid sisters, perhaps his daughters: Baligijarr, Manabirrina, and Manbarra (youngest) through the country between Oenpelli and Darwin.Wanyjuwanyjuwa morphs into a malevolent shooting star who shuts up people in a cave to cook them at a site called Balkgamirni.

== Alternative names ==
Tindale supplied the following list of alternative spellings and names:

- Baneidja
- Bani:dja
- Banidja
- Buneidja
- Minnitji
- Peneitja
- Punaka
- Punuurlu

== Some words ==
- bambarl (nulla-nulla)
- dimarrkginyan =dingo
- gagi = father
- giji = mother (address form)
- jilalarr (magpie)
- ngilyi = dog

== Sources ==
- Eylmann, Erhard (1908). Die Eingeborenen der Kolonie Südaustralien (PDF). Berlin: D.Reimer – via Internet Archive.
- Gibson, Jano (24 March 2022). "Nearly half of Kakadu National Park to be handed back to Aboriginal traditional owners". ABC News. Australian Broadcasting Corporation.
- Harvey, Mark (2001). A Grammar of Limilngan: A Language of the Mary River Region, Northern Territory, Australia (PDF). Research School of Pacific and Asian Studies. ISBN 978-0-858-83461-3.
- "Limilngan". AIATSIS. 26 July 2019.
- Spencer, Baldwin (1914). Native tribes of the Northern Territory of Australia (PDF). London: Macmillan Publishers – via Internet Archive.
- Spencer, Baldwin (1928). Wanderings in wild Australia. London: Macmillan Publishers – via Internet Archive.
- Tindale, Norman Barnett (1974). "Puneitja (NT)". Aboriginal Tribes of Australia: Their Terrain, Environmental Controls, Distribution, Limits, and Proper Names. Australian National University.
