= Escape Cliffs =

Historic settlement site in the Northern Territory, Australia

Coordinates: 12°08′S 131°15′E

- Patter Purrer (Wulna)
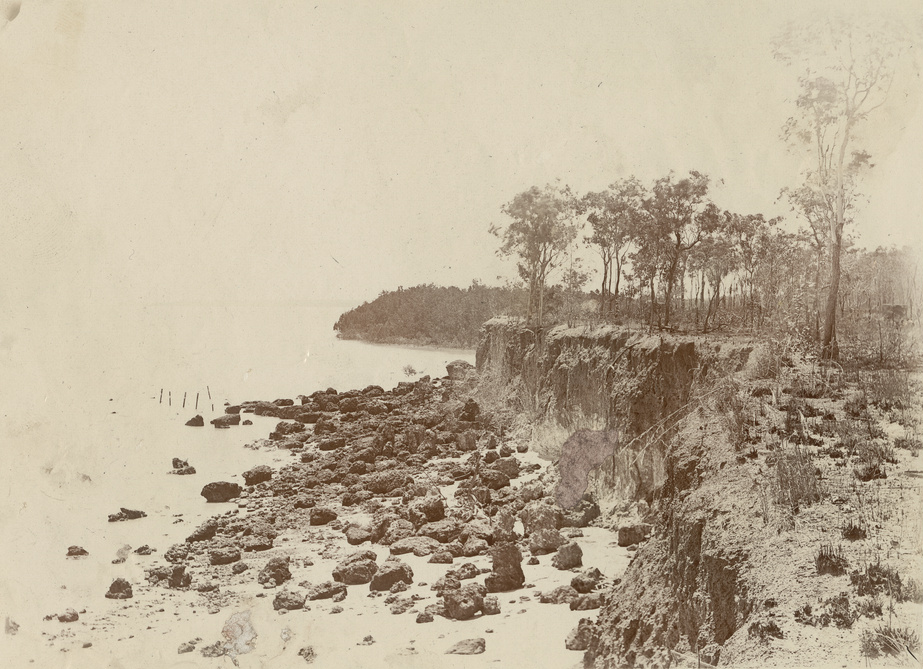
- Escape Cliffs, looking north-east

- Location within Northern Territory Location within Australia
- Location: Hotham, Northern Territory, Australia

History
- Establishment: 1864
- Demolished: 1867

Site notes
- Owner: Limilngan-Wulna Aboriginal Corporation

Northern Territory Heritage Register
- Official name: Escape Cliffs
- Designated: 12 January 2000

Escape Cliffs is a place on the northern coast of the Northern Territory of Australia, that was the site of the fourth of a series of failed attempts to establish a permanent British settlement in Australia's Top End. Previous attempts were at Fort Dundas, Fort Wellington and Port Essington. There is no road access, though it is sometimes visited by yachts.

== Geography ==
Escape Cliffs is located on the western coast of the Cape Hotham peninsula, and the eastern shore of Adam Bay, near the mouth and estuary of the Adelaide River. It lies about 60 km north-east of Darwin and is located in the Cape Hotham sector of the Djukbinj National Park. It was named by John Lort Stokes of HMS Beagle after visiting the spot in 1839, and refers to an incident where a Mr Fitzmaurice and a Mr Keys escaped from beneath the cliffs after being intimidated by hostile Woolna men.

Crew members dancing to avoid being speared at Escape Cliffs (1846)

== History ==
In 1864, the year after South Australia was granted control over the Northern Territory, the South Australian government decided that settlement of the area was desirable and sent a surveying and settlement expedition under the command of Lieutenant Colonel Boyle Travers Finniss, a former Premier of South Australia. He had been instructed to establish a settlement at an ideal place in the region and chose the Escape Cliffs site despite disagreements with other members of his party. It was intended to cover settlement costs through sales of land, much of which had already been presold to speculators and intending settlers even before the expedition reached the site and began their survey work. Finniss believed that the site could produce tropical vegetation and would be suitable for wool-growing and cattle farming.

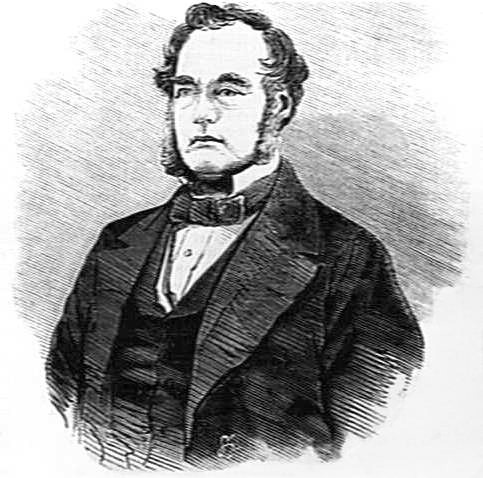
Boyle Finniss was in charge of establishing the Escape Cliffs settlement

After a confused start, following an abortive initial move to another site some 65 km up the Adelaide River, the establishment work at Escape Cliffs began. The local Woolna people resisted the incursion of the British into their country, which culminated in the spearing of several horses and men and the murder of two Aborigines and one colonist. The unsuitability of the land due to tidal flooding and poor drainage in the wet season, exacerbated by personal jealousies, poor leadership and the need for constant vigilance, resulted in ongoing disputes and deteriorating morale.

Following complaints and unfavourable reports to the South Australian government, notably by Dr. Goldsmith, Finniss was recalled in 1865, replaced by his second-in-command James Thomas Manton. John McKinlay, who was sent by the government to assess the viability of Escape Cliffs or find a better site, in 1865, declared it worthless, Manton reported there was nothing they could usefully do there but guard their stores. In October 1866 Government ordered a recall of Manton and his men aboard the steamer Eagle, Captain Hill, which left 11 January 1867, transhipped to the Rangatira at Sydney, and arrived in Adelaide 2 February 1867.

Two years later, following a better-organised expedition by George Goyder, settlement began at what is now Darwin.

On 12 January 2000, a parcel of land at Escape Cliffs was listed on the Northern Territory Heritage Register.

== See also ==
- Fort Dundas
- Raffles Bay
- Port Essington
