= N42 =

N42 may refer to:

- BMW N42, an automobile engine
- HMS Pandora (N42), a submarine of the Royal Navy
- Kunda language, a Bantu language of Zimbabwe
- Limilngan language, an extinct Aboriginal Australian language
- Lithuanian ship Jotvingis (N42), a minelayer of the Lithuanian Navy
- Tien Shan Astronomical Observatory, in Kazakhstan
