= MBTA (disambiguation) =

The MBTA usually refers to the Massachusetts Bay Transportation Authority.

MBTA may also refer to:

- Migratory Bird Treaty Act of 1918, a U.S. federal law
- Morongo Basin Transit Authority, a transit authority in California, U.S.
- Mount Bundey Training Area, a military training area in the Northern Territory of Australia
