= WUX =

WUX or wux may refer to:

- WUX, the IATA code for Sunan Shuofang International Airport, Jiangsu Province, China
- wux, the ISO 639-3 code for Wulna language, an extinct indigenous language of Australia
