= Mount Bundey Training Area =

Military training area near Humpty Doo, NT, Australia

- MBTA
- Mount Bundey, Northern Territory in Australia
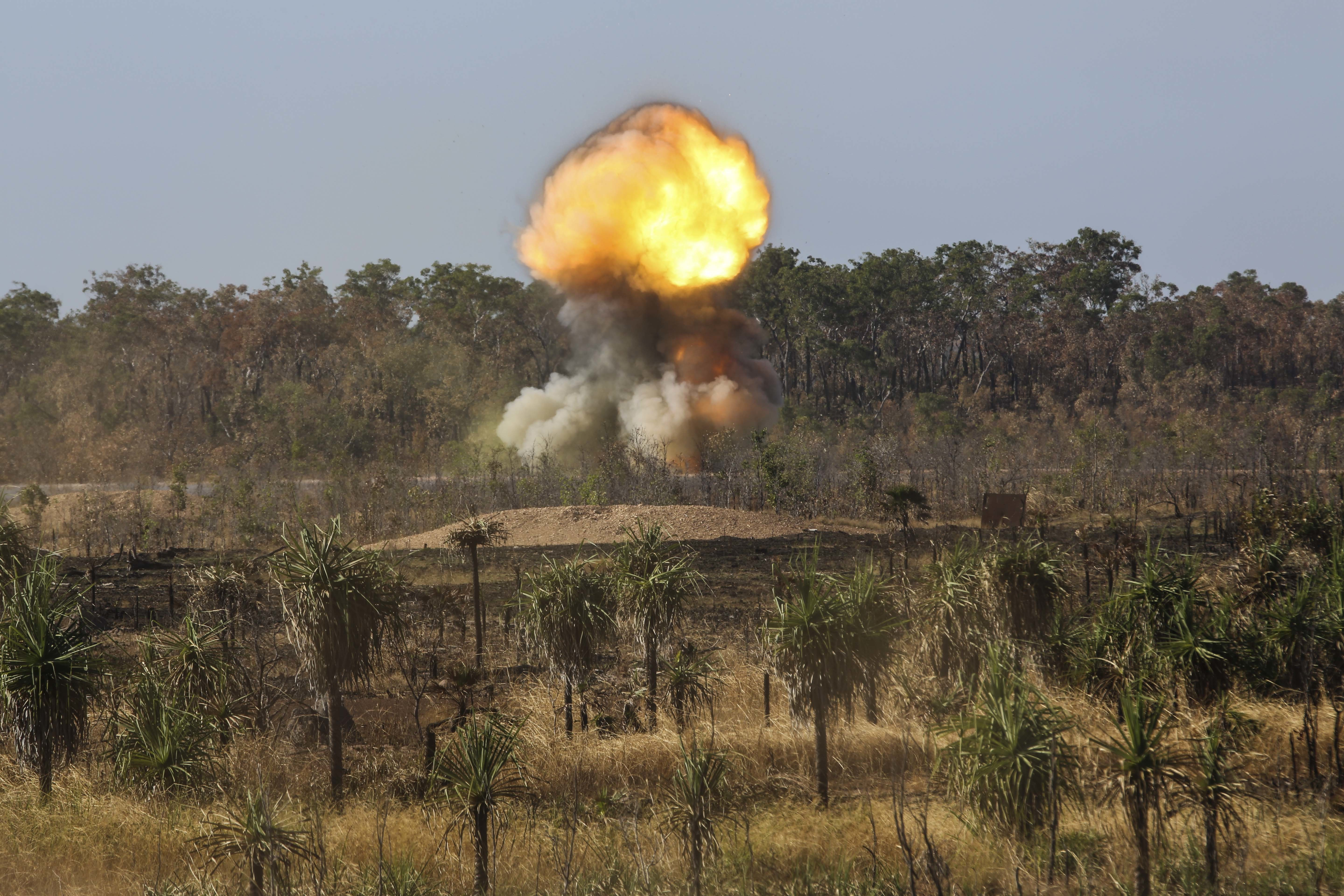
- Demolition range at Mount Bundey Training Area

Site information
- Type: Army Training Area (1988-present)
- Owner: Department of Defence
- Operator: Australian Army (1988-present)

Location
- Location in Northern Territory
- Coordinates: 12°59′56″S 131°47′49″E
- Area: 117,300 hectares (290,000 acres)

Site history
- In use: 1988 – present

The Mount Bundey Training Area (MBTA) is a 117,300-hectare (290,000-acre) military training area in the Northern Territory of Australia.

== History ==
Formerly a cattle station, the property was acquired as a Defence Training Area in 1988.

An Urban Operations Training Facility was constructed in 2005.

The MBTA has been heavily used by the US Marine Air Ground Task Force since its first deployment in 2012.

In mid-2017 the ADF held Exercise Southern Jackaroo at Mount Bundey with elements of the 1st Brigade – Australian Army, US Marine Rotation Force – Darwin (MRF-D) and the Japanese Ground Self Defence Force (JGSDF).

In 2021, prime minister Scott Morrison visited Robertson Barracks, where he announced a spend of A$747 million to upgrade the Robertson Barracks Close Training Area, Kangaroo Flats Training Area, Mount Bundey Training Area, and Bradshaw Field Training Area. This was part of a total of A$8 billion allocated for spending on defence installations in the Northern Territory.

== Location and description ==
MBTA is a 117,300-hectare (290,000-acre) military training area located 75 km (47 mi) south-east of Humpty Doo, south of the Arnhem Highway, between the Mary River and Kakadu National Park.

The United States and Singaporean militaries both conduct joint tank exercises with Australian forces in the MBTA.
