= Adelaide and Mary River Floodplains =

Floodplain in Northern Territory, Australia

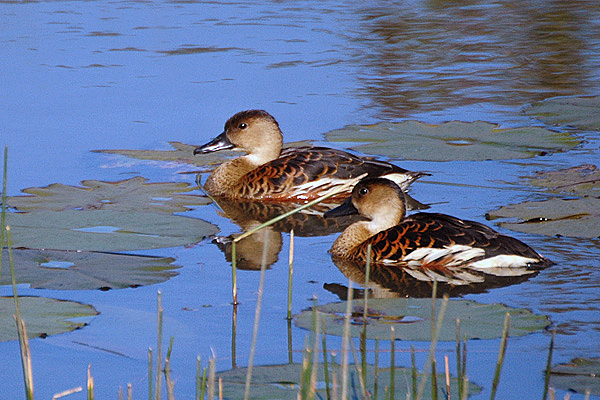
The IBA supports nearly 200,000 Wandering Whistling Ducks

The Adelaide and Mary River Floodplains are a 2,687 square kilometres (1,037 sq mi) region comprising the adjoining floodplains of the Adelaide and Mary Rivers in the Top End of Australia’s Northern Territory. It lies east of the city of Darwin and west of Kakadu National Park and the Alligator Rivers IBA, where the rivers flow northwards through seasonally inundated tropical lowlands into the Van Diemen Gulf.

== Birds ==
The floodplains have been identified by BirdLife International as an Important Bird Area (IBA) because they support over 1% of the world populations of several species of waterbirds, including magpie geese (up to 800,000), wandering whistling ducks (188,000), pied herons (2000), red-necked avocets (3000), little curlews (12,000), Far Eastern curlews (1050), and sharp-tailed sandpipers (2500). There are large breeding colonies containing 30,000 mixed waterbirds, significant numbers of bush stone-curlews and 11 species that either have restricted ranges or are confined to savanna biomes.
