= Point Stuart, Northern Territory =

Point Stuart
- Suburb
- Coordinates: 12°33′40″S 131°52′23″E
- Country: Australia
- State: Northern Territory
- LGA: unincorporated area
- Location: 100 km (62 mi) E of Darwin City
- Established: 4 April 2007

Government
  - Territory electorate: Goyder
  - Federal division: Lingiari
- Elevation: 1 m (3.3 ft)

Population
  - Total: 22 (2016 census)
- Time zone: UTC+9:30 (ACST)
- Postcode: 0822
- Mean max temp: 32.9 °C (91.2 °F)
- Mean min temp: 22.8 °C (73.0 °F)
- Annual rainfall: 1,387.7 mm (54.63 in)
Suburbs around Point Stuart
Van Diemen Gulf	Van Diemen Gulf	Van Diemen Gulf
Marrakai	Point Stuart	Kakadu
Marrakai; Mount Bundey	Mount Bundey	Kakadu
- Locations; Adjoining localities

Point Stuart is a locality in the Northern Territory of Australia located about 100 kilometres (62 mi) east of the territorial capital of Darwin.

The locality consists of land bounded in part to the west by the Mary River, in part to the north by the coastline of Van Diemen Gulf, to the east by the Kakadu National Park and in the south by the Arnhem Highway. The locality was named after a feature on the coastline of Van Diemen Gulf which was named in honour of John McDouall Stuart for his successful crossing of the Australian continent in 1862.Its boundaries and name were gazetted on 4 April 2007.

The 2016 Australian census which was conducted in August 2016 reports that Point Stuart had 22 people living within its boundaries.

Point Stuart is located within the federal division of Lingiari, the territory electoral division of Goyder and within the unincorporated areas of the Northern Territory.

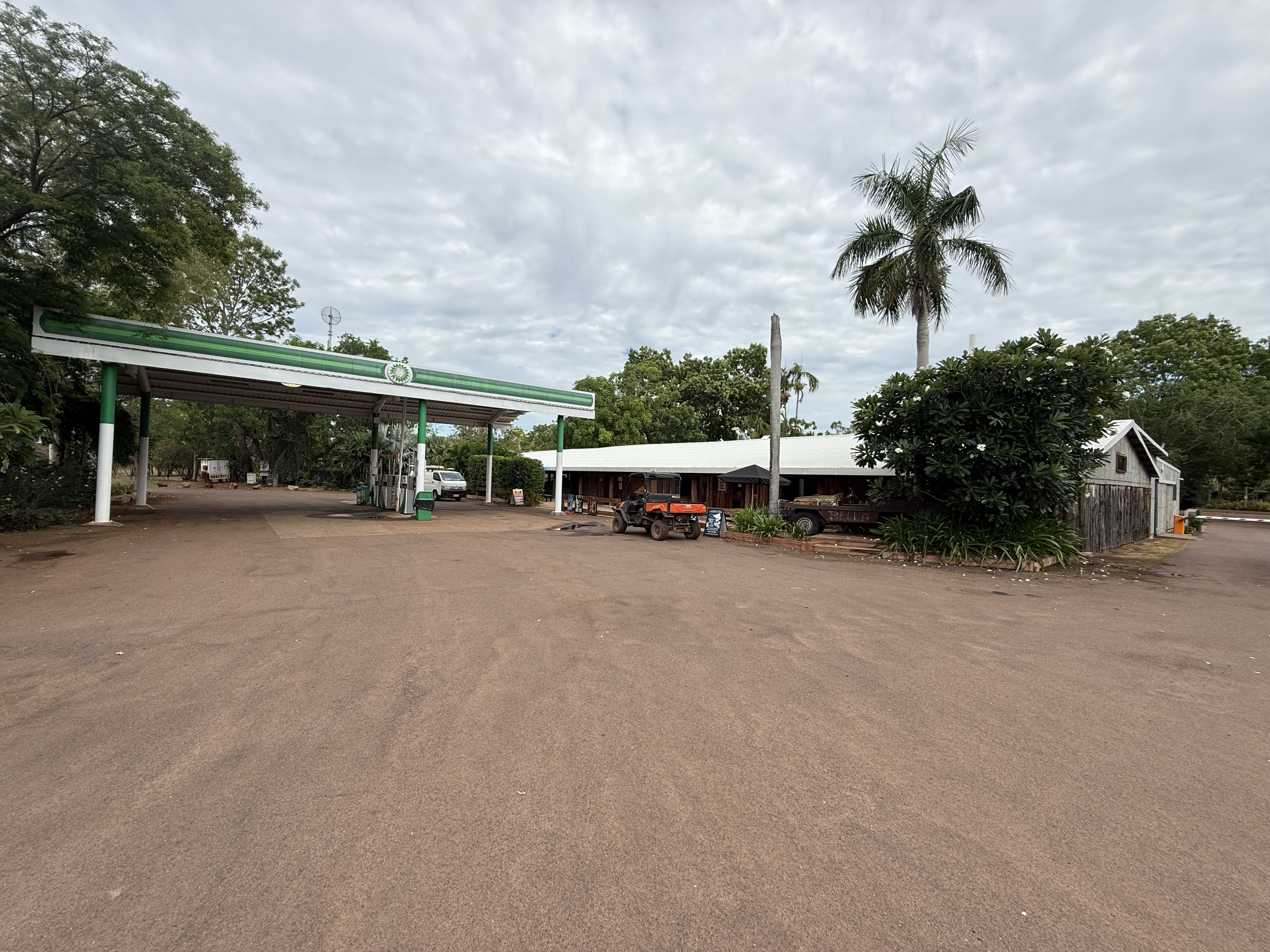
Bark Hut Inn, located in Point Stuart on the Arnhem Highway, October 2025

== Climate ==
The airstrip has a tropical savanna climate (Köppen: Aw) with a wet season from November to April and a dry season from May to October. Extreme temperatures ranged from 38.8 °C (101.8 °F) on 7 November 2020 to 8.4 °C (47.1 °F) on 25 July 2023. The wettest recorded day was 25 December 2021 with 174.6 mm (6.87 in) of rainfall.

Climate data for Point Stuart (12.24°S 131.88°E) (1 m (3.3 ft) AMSL) (1994-2025)
Month	Jan	Feb	Mar	Apr	May	Jun	Jul	Aug	Sep	Oct	Nov	Dec	Year
Record high °C (°F)	37.6 (99.7)	36.5 (97.7)	36.2 (97.2)	35.9 (96.6)	35.3 (95.5)	34.4 (93.9)	35.5 (95.9)	36.8 (98.2)	38.2 (100.8)	38.3 (100.9)	38.8 (101.8)	38.3 (100.9)	38.8 (101.8)
Mean daily maximum °C (°F)	32.6 (90.7)	32.3 (90.1)	32.4 (90.3)	32.8 (91.0)	32.2 (90.0)	31.5 (88.7)	31.4 (88.5)	32.4 (90.3)	33.5 (92.3)	34.8 (94.6)	34.9 (94.8)	34.0 (93.2)	32.9 (91.2)
Mean daily minimum °C (°F)	25.2 (77.4)	25.1 (77.2)	25.2 (77.4)	24.4 (75.9)	21.6 (70.9)	19.5 (67.1)	18.2 (64.8)	18.7 (65.7)	21.6 (70.9)	24.3 (75.7)	25.0 (77.0)	25.3 (77.5)	22.8 (73.1)
Record low °C (°F)	21.0 (69.8)	20.8 (69.4)	20.7 (69.3)	16.4 (61.5)	14.0 (57.2)	10.3 (50.5)	8.4 (47.1)	10.2 (50.4)	14.6 (58.3)	19.6 (67.3)	21.3 (70.3)	22.3 (72.1)	8.4 (47.1)
Average precipitation mm (inches)	297.8 (11.72)	269.2 (10.60)	220.1 (8.67)	116.9 (4.60)	16.5 (0.65)	1.4 (0.06)	0.6 (0.02)	8.3 (0.33)	10.9 (0.43)	51.6 (2.03)	113.9 (4.48)	234.7 (9.24)	1,387.7 (54.63)
Average precipitation days (≥ 0.2 mm)	18.5	18.1	16.3	8.4	2.9	0.9	0.5	0.8	1.8	4.3	8.6	14.5	95.6
Source: Bureau of Meteorology (1994-2025)
