= Wildman River Wilderness Work Camp =

Prison in the Northern Territory, Australia 1980s – 2003

- Location: Mary River National Park, Northern Territory
- Status: closed
- Security class: Minimum Security
- Capacity: 20
- Opened: 1980s
- Closed: 2003
- Managed by: Northern Territory Correctional Services

Wildman River Wilderness Work Camp was an Australian minimum security prison for juvenile males located in the Northern Territory of Australia in the Mary River National Park about 170 kilometres (110 mi) from the territory capital of Darwin.

== Facilities ==
Established during the 1980s, the work camp was designed for juvenile detainees from remote Aboriginal communities. The focus of the camp was on reparation through work for the Parks and Wildlife Commission of the Northern Territory, other government agencies and service clubs. The camp has capacity for 20 male detainees and offers case management in support of offender rehabilitation. As at 2005, the facility was not in operation.
