= Beriguruk =

Indigenous people of Northern Territory

The Beriguruk were an indigenous Australian people, now thought to be extinct, of the Northern Territory.

== Country ==
The Beriguruk used to inhabit the area southwards from the mouth of Mary River, mainly on its eastern bank, and running inland, but not frequenting the marshland and beaches of the coastal area, which were in the domain of the Djerimanga. Beriguruk traditional lands extend over some 500 square miles (1,300 km^{2}).

== Alternative names ==
- Perrigurruk
- Eri, Erei
- Rereri (?) Reveri (typo perhaps)
- Wolna, Woolna, Woolner, Wulnar, Woolnough Wulna
- Wuna
- Birrigarak (Warray exonym)
- Berrigurruk, Berugurruk

== Sources ==
- "Beriguruk". AIATSIS. 26 July 2019.
- Parkhouse, T. A. (1895). "Native tongues in the neighbourhood of Port Darwin". Transactions of the Royal Society of South Australia. 19: 1–18.
- Tindale, Norman Barnett (1974). "Beriguruk (NT)". Aboriginal Tribes of Australia: Their Terrain, Environmental Controls, Distribution, Limits, and Proper Names. Australian National University. ISBN 978-0-708-10741-6. Archived from the original on 20 March 2020.
