= Bugurnidja language =

Aboriginal language of northern Australia

Bugurnidja
- Region: Northern Territory
- Extinct: by 2005
- Language family: Darwin: Umbugarlic?; Bugurnidja

Language codes
- ISO 639-3: None (mis)
- Glottolog: None
- AIATSIS: N42.1

Bugurnidja is an Australian Aboriginal language of Arnhem Land in northern Australia. Almost nothing is known of it; apparently Nicholas Evans collected some data from a single speaker, and this showed similarities to Ngomburr.
