= James Thomas Manton =

James Thomas Manton (c. 1812 – 6 June 1899) was a surveyor and engineer in the young colony of South Australia and a pioneer of the Northern Territory. He may have been the first to propose the site of present-day Darwin for the Territory's principal settlement, Palmerston.

== History ==
Manton and his wife Caroline Manton, née Webb, (c. 1821 – 1 September 1915) arrived in South Australia from London in November 1849 aboard Bolton.

He had letters of introduction from Earl Grey, and was immediately put in charge of erection of the Cape Willoughby Lighthouse, South Australia's first, and which still stands. He was then employed as a surveyor by the Central Road Board, appointed Superintending Surveyor for the Southern region, and was responsible for Tapleys Hill Road and South Road.

In 1864 he was selected by the government to be second-in-charge to B. T. Finniss, who led a party of 40 by the barque Henry Ellis to Adam Bay in the Northern Territory, where a settlement was to be founded at Escape Cliffs. That the project failed had much to do with Finniss's leadership, but Manton remained loyal throughout. When Finniss was brought back to Adelaide by the Ellen Lewis to answer charges levelled against him, Manton became the responsible officer, and had the added complication of John McKinlay and party, who were not answerable to him but had to be given all possible assistance. By one account, if Finniss was a tyrant, Manton was no better, and more arbitrary in his dealings with the men. He did some useful explorations however. With a party of nine he sailed further up the Adelaide River than had been previously undertaken, and reported that the soil, though clayey, was well-drained and more suitable to agriculture than anything he had seen previously in the Top End. They investigated the East and South Alligator rivers without finding anything useful, then turned westward, where they were impressed with the harbour at Port Darwin, and found that Point Emery had all the practical requisites for a settlement: good water could be had by sinking wells, and there was a large area of tableland with fine sea views. In October 1866 the Government decided to recall Manton and his men, as there was nothing they could do while McKinlay was exploring and the Beatrice was away except protect themselves and their stores from depredations from the Aborigines. The settlement at Escape Cliffs was abandoned and all remaining personnel sailed away aboard the steamer Eagle, Captain Hill, on 11 January 1867, transshipped to the Rangatira in Sydney, and arrived in Adelaide on 4 February 1867.

== Personal ==
Manton was a regular worshipper at St Michael's (Anglican) Church, Mitcham, and held several responsible positions with that church. He died at his home, Wattlebury Road, Lower Mitcham, after a long illness.

== Recognition ==
The Manton River, and hence Manton Dam and the outer Darwin suburb of Manton were named for him.
