= Laragiya language =

Endangered Darwin language spoken in Australia

Laragiya
- Gulumirrgin
- Region: Near Darwin, Northern Territory, Australia
- Ethnicity: Larrakia
- Native speakers: 41 (2021 census)
- Language family: Darwin: Laragiya

Language codes
- ISO 639-3: lrg
- Glottolog: lara1258
- AIATSIS: N21
- ELP: Larrakiya
- Linguasphere: 28-HBA-a

The Laragiya language, also spelt Larrakia (deriving from Larrakia people), and also known as Gulumirrgin, is an Australian Aboriginal language spoken by just six people near the city of Darwin in northern Australia as of 1983. Only 41 people claimed to know the Laragiya language in 2021.

Laragiya was once considered a language isolate, but Mark Harvey has made a case for it being part of a family of Darwin Region languages.

Linguist Arthur Capell wrote,

"Even in 1950 there were no children speaking it, and most of the older people who spoke it in 1952 (when the bulk of these notes was gathered) were found on the Delissaville Reserve (now Belyuen), across the harbour from Darwin. By 1968, reports of only two speakers could be gained, and these far away from Darwin. In former times, however, the tribe was fairly large, and its territory extended to the Coolalinga, where it joined that of a tribe called "Woolna" by the early writers, while on the south-east it was bounded by the Warrai. These latter languages are practically unrecorded.

"The present outline of Laragia is based on notes taken at various periods, chiefly 1949 and 1952. The notes have been systematised as far as possible, but they make no claim to provide a fully laid out grammar, especially on the phonetic level."

== Phonology ==
=== Consonants ===
	Peripheral		Laminal	Apical	
	Labial	Velar	Palatal	Alveolar	Retroflex
Stop	b	ɡ	ɟ	d	ɖ
Nasal	m	ŋ	ɲ	n	ɳ
Fricative	β				
Lateral			ʎ	l	ɭ
Rhotic				r	(ɽ)
Approximant	w		j	ɹ	

- /ɽ/ appears in some dialects.

=== Vowels ===
	Front	Central	Back
High	i	ɵ~ʉ	u
Mid	e ɛ	ɵ~ʉ	o
Low		a	

- /o/ can have an allophone of [ɔ].
- The sound variation of [ɵ~ʉ] is written as one vowel sound ö.

"Morphophonemic rules are not so complex in Laragia as in Maung and Jiwadja, though some are shared between the three languages. One in particular is shared with Ngarinyin in the Northern Kimberley Division of Western Australia. The chief difficulties in setting up an orthography for Laragia are due to certain morphophonemic rules, but others arise from the indefinite pronunciations..."

== Morphology ==
Concord formation

"Laragia is a member of the multiple-classifying language group, but has the somewhat unusual practice of combining prefixes and suffixes in the formation of the concord. The Laragia concord is shown by a discontinuous morpheme - at least in many cases, but not in the verb - partly prefixal and partly suffixal. "It is what Zellig Harris called a 'broken sequence'. It may be mentioned in passing that the majority of the multiple-classifying languages in North Australia used prefixal forms to mark the classes, but a few, such as Worora and Unggumi in the Northern Kimberley Division of Western Australia, have vestigial suffixes, while a few on the Barkly Tablelands in the eastern part of the Northern Territory use only suffixes. These phenomena suggest that the languages originally had, as Laragia still does, markers at each end of the word."

Larrakia Elder Robert Mills of Batji Tours is able to name plants and animals. Lorraine Williams, a Larrakia woman and Research Associate with the School of Australian Indigenous Knowledge Systems published online, "For a lot of my life I have been involved in and have given evidence as a claimant in the Kenbi Land Claim and the Darwin Native Title proceedings. I am currently working on Larrakia Cultural Heritage Management focusing on Larrakia archaeological sites in the Darwin region and I have a keen interest in all things Larrakia. In years gone by I have worked on Larrakia ethnobiology with the view to keeping Larrakia language and culture strong. I am a member of the Batcho family of the Larrakia Nation Aboriginal Corporation".

The Larrakia have in the past referred to themselves as Gulumerrgin. Gulumerrgin is one of the names for the language spoken by the Larrakia.

== Vocabulary ==
Capell (1940) lists the following basic vocabulary items:

gloss	Laragia
man	bilöva
woman	binjidba
head	maːluma
eye	damaɽa
nose	gwingwa
mouth	gwiabulgwa
tongue	gwiamilawa
stomach	med’lema
bone	mujagwa
blood	damadjila
kangaroo	mi’luːlula
opossum	gudgida
crow	goaːgoaːva
fly	gumulɛːlva
sun	dalira
moon	duːrjawa
fire	gujuguwa
smoke	damudjila
water	gaːɽuwa
