= Umbugarla language =

Australian language isolate

Umbugarla
- Mbukarla
- Native to: Australia
- Region: Northern Territory
- Extinct: c. 1990s, with the death of Butcher Knight
- Language family: Darwin: Umbugarlic; Umbugarla

Language codes
- ISO 639-3: umr
- Glottolog: umbu1235
- AIATSIS: N43
- ELP: Umbugarla
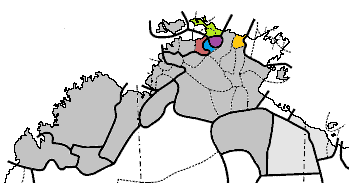
- historic distribution of Umbugarla

Umbugarla or Mbukarla is a possible Australian language isolate once spoken by three people in Arnhem Land, northern Australia as of 1981, and is now extinct.

== Classification ==
Umbugarla was once considered a language isolate (together with Ngurmbur as a dialect), but Mark Harvey has made a case for it being part of a family of Darwin Region languages.

Ngurmbur and Bugurnidja are poorly attested extinct languages, which are joined with Umbugarla to form the Umbugarlic branch.

Tryon (2007) lists the following varieties of Umbugarla–Ngumbur:

Ngunbudj (Gonbudj), Umbugarla, Bugunidja, Ngarduk, Ngumbur.

However, nothing is known of Ngunbudj or Ngarduk, which were extinct by World War II.

== Phonology ==
=== Consonants ===
	Peripheral		Laminal	Apical	
	Labial	Velar	Palatal	Alveolar	Retroflex
Plosive	b	ɡ	ɟ	d	ɖ
Nasal	m	ŋ	ɲ	n	ɳ
Lateral			ʎ	l	ɭ
Rhotic					ɽ
Approximant	w		j	ɹ	

- /ɡ/ can be heard as either stops [k] or [ʔ] when in word-final or word-medial position, and as a fricative [ɣ] when in intervocalic position.
- /ɽ/ can also be heard as an alveolar tap [ɾ] when in intervocalic position.

=== Vowels ===
	Front	Back
High	i iː	u uː
Mid	ɛ	ɔ
Low	a aː	

- Vowels can be lengthened when in open syllables or in word-final position.

Phoneme	Allophones
/a/	[ä], [äː], [æ], [ɛ], [ə], [ɒ], [o]
/ɛ/	[ɛ], [ɛː]
/i/	[i], [iː], [ɨ], [ʉ], [ə], [eː]
/u/	[u], [uː], [o], [oː], [ʉ], [ə]
/uː/	[uː], [oː]
