= Wulna language =

Extinct indigenous language of Australia

Wulna
- Beriguruk, Wuna
- Native to: Australia
- Region: Arnhem Land
- Ethnicity: Beriguruk, Djerimanga
- Extinct: (date missing); 1 (1981)
- Language family: Darwin Region: Limilngan; Wulna

Language codes
- ISO 639-3: wux
- Glottolog: wuln1239
- AIATSIS: N29
- ELP: Wulna

Wulna (also expressed as Woolna, Woolner or Wuna) is an extinct Indigenous language of Australia spoken by the Woolna people. It was a non-Pama-Nyungan language spoken in the Adelaide River region of the Northern Territory. It is poorly attested and only tentatively classified as being related to Limilngan.

It had one speaker left in 1981, Jack Wandi, who was recorded by Gavan Breen in 1980-1981.

== Resources ==
The State Library of New South Wales has an original copy of Vocabulary of the Woolner District Dialect, Adelaide River, Northern Territory by John W. O. Bennett (1869).

The book documents the vocabulary and pronunciation of Wulna in general, in addition to place names from the Adelaide River region of Northern Territory. The original copy has been annotated by Paul Foelsche, the first police inspector of Northern Territory, who has added his own words to the vocabulary list, and his own corrections on pronunciation.
