= Milkwood =

Milkwood may refer to:

== Plant species or genera ==
- Alstonia, a widespread genus of evergreen trees and shrubs from the dogbane family Apocynaceae
- Lobelia scaevolifolia, an endemic lobelioid from the island of St Helena
- Sideroxylon inerme, or white milkwood of southern Africa, a member of the Sapotaceae
- Tabernaemontana, a pan-tropical genus of 100-110 species of flowering plants in the family Apocynaceae

== Music ==
- Milkwood (band), Anglo-Canadian rock band formed in 1969

== See also ==
- Under Milk Wood, a 1954 radio drama
