= Ngurmbur language =

Aboriginal Australian language of the Northern Territory

Ngurmbur
- Ngomburr
- Native to: Australia
- Region: Northern Territory
- Ethnicity: Ngormbur
- Extinct: c. 1990s, with the death of Butcher Knight
- Language family: Darwin: Umbugarlic?; Ngurmbur

Language codes
- ISO 639-3: nrx
- Glottolog: ngur1260
- AIATSIS: N40.1
- ELP: Ngomburr

Ngomburr, also spelt Ngumbur, is an extinct Australian Aboriginal language. It has sometimes been assumed to be a dialect of Umbugarla, but it is poorly attested; the only evidence to go on is that neighbouring peoples reported that it was similar to Umbugarla, as well as some sentences and vocabulary. It was spoken to the west of the South Alligator River, between the Ga'baarlgu and the South Alligator River, in Kakadu, Northern Territory.

There were two speakers recorded in 1975, and one in 1981, but none since then, on the AUSTLANG database. The last speaker, Butcher Knight, died sometime between 1987 and 2001.
