= Adam Bay =

Adam Bay Northern Territory
- Coordinates: 12°12′S 131°12′E
- Time zone: ACST (UTC+9:30)
- Location: 50 km (31 mi) ENE of Darwin
- Territory electorate(s): Nelson
- Federal division(s): Lingiari

Adam Bay is a locality in the Northern Territory of Australia located about 50 kilometres (30 mi) ENE of the territory capital of Darwin. Escape Cliffs (named for an encounter between Aboriginals and several officers of HMS Beagle) lies on its eastern shore.

Adam Bay was named after Admiral Sir Charles Adam in 1840 by Captain John Clements Wickham of HMS Beagle .

== History ==
Adam Bay was investigated in 1864 by a survey party led by Boyle Travers Finniss, as the possible location of a settlement to be named "Palmerston", favoured as the outlet of the Adelaide River, which is navigable for a great distance. It was eventually abandoned in favour of Port Darwin. See Survey parties to the Northern Territory 1864–1870.

== Geography ==
Adam Bay is located within the federal division of Lingiari, the territory electoral division of Nelson and the local government area of the Litchfield Municipality.
