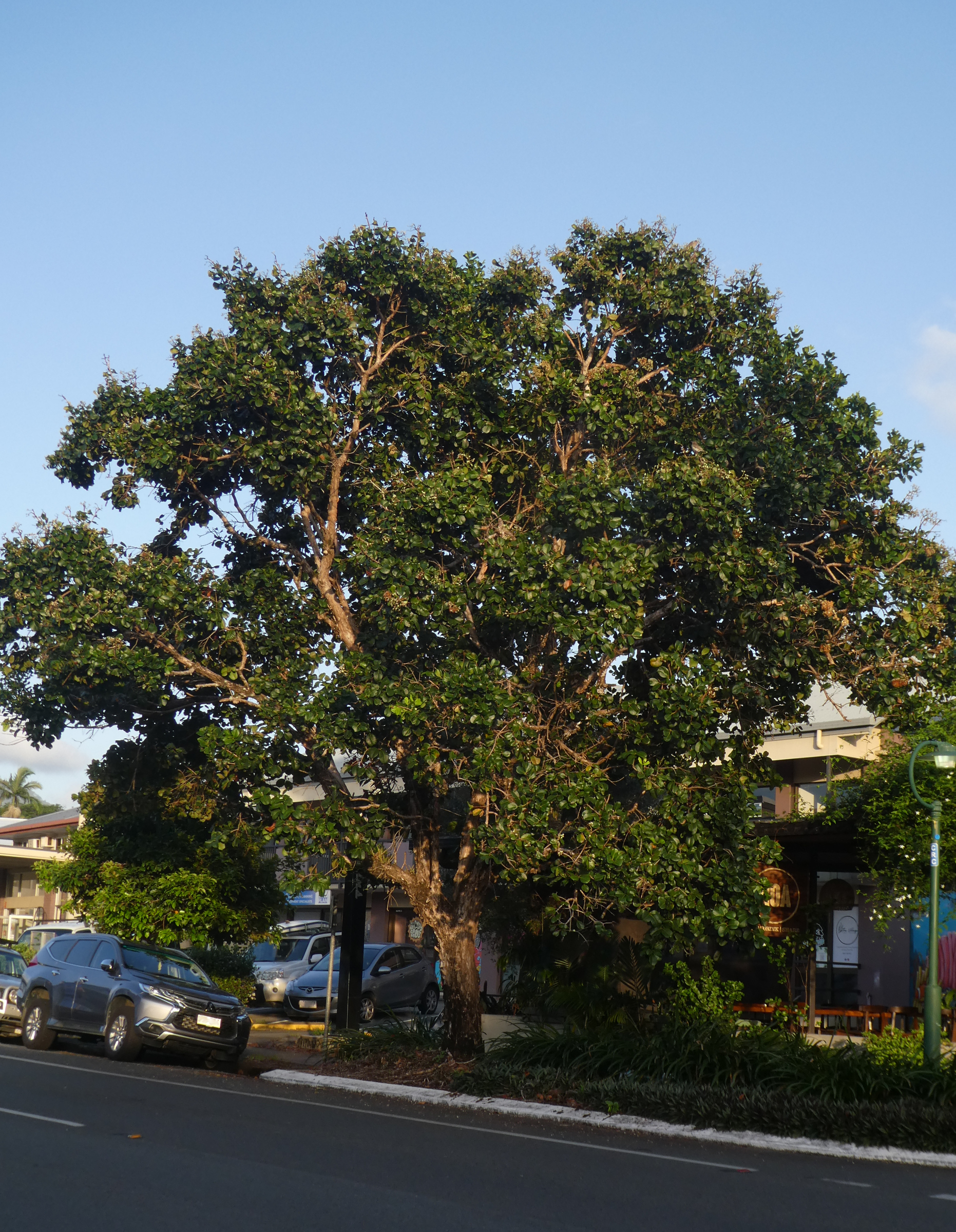
- A street planting in Edge Hill, Queensland

Conservation status
- Least Concern (IUCN 3.1)
- Least Concern (NCA)

Scientific classification
- Kingdom: Plantae
- Clade: Tracheophytes
- Clade: Angiosperms
- Clade: Eudicots
- Clade: Rosids
- Order: Myrtales
- Family: Myrtaceae
- Genus: Syzygium
- Species: S. forte

Binomial name
- Syzygium forte (F. Muell.) B.Hyland

Subspecies
- Syzygium forte subsp. forte; Syzygium forte subsp. potamophilum B.Hyland

Synonyms
- Eugenia fortis F.Muell.; synonyms of subsp. forte: Syzygium rubiginosum Merr. & L.M.Perry

= Syzygium forte =

Flakey-barked satinash

Species of plant in the myrtle family

Syzygium forte, commonly known as flaky-barked satinash, white apple or brown satinash, is a tree in the family Myrtaceae native to New Guinea and northern Australia. It was first described in 1865 and is classified as least concern. The fruit are edible, and it is used as a landscaping tree for streets and parks.

== Description ==
Syzygium forte typically grows up to 25 metres (82 ft) in height in its native habitat, with reddish brown or pinkish, flakey bark. The leaves are arranged in opposite pairs on the twigs and are mid green in colour, paler below. They are somewhat leathery and have revolute margins. The leaf lamina measure up to 14 by 8 centimetres (5.5 by 3.1 in) with a thick and pale mid-rib. Those of subspecies S. f. forte are usually orbicular to obovate, while those of subspecies S. f. potamophilum can be narrowly ovate, elliptic or lanceolate.

Flowering occurs between September and January. The much-branched inflorescence terminates the leafy twigs in subspecies S. f. forte, and are produced below the leaves or inside the crown in subspecies S. f. potamophilum. The white flowers form in dense clusters with multiple white stamens.

The fruits are a globular white berry up to 6 centimetres (2 in) diameter, containing a single large seed.

== Taxonomy ==
This species was first formally described as Eugenia fortis by the German born Australian botanist Ferdinand von Mueller in 1865 as part of his massive work Fragmenta Phytographiae Australiae. In 1983 the species was reclassified by Bernie Hyland in his paper A revision of Syzygium and allied genera (Myrtaceae) in Australia, which was published in the Australian Journal of Botany Supplementary Series.

=== Infraspecies ===
As of November 2022 there are two recognised subspecies, as follows:

- Syzygium forte subsp. forte (F.Muell.) B.Hyland.
- Syzygium forte subsp. potamophilum B.Hyland.

=== Etymology ===
The genus name Syzygium was coined by Joseph Gaertner in 1788, and is taken from the Greek word syzgos, meaning "jointed" and is a reference to the paired leaves displayed by members of the genus. The species epithet forte is from the Latin fortis meaning 'strong'.

== Distribution and habitat ==
Syzygium forte is native to New Guinea and the northern parts of Western Australia, the Northern Territory and Queensland in Australia. The subspecies S. f. potamophilum is found in all three states, and is the only species found in Western Australia. It is thought to be endemic to Australia. The other, S. f. forte, is found in the Northern Territory, Queensland and New Guinea.

It prefers sandy soils and is both cyclone resistant and salt tolerant. As a result it is commonly found in beach forests and rocky headlands, but is also found in rainforests to an altitude of around 450 metres (1,480 ft).

In Western Australia this species is found in gallery forest along watercourses in the Kimberley region, where it grows in sandstone soils up to 200 metres (660 ft) above sea level.

== Ecology ==
The fruit are eaten by cassowaries and fruit bats. The flowers attract many species of birds and insects.

== Cultivation and uses ==
Indigenous Australians ate the fruit and used the leaves as a fish poison.

This species is too large for most private gardens but is useful as a park and street tree. The Cairns Regional Council has planted well over 400 of both subspecies combined throughout the city and suburbs.

The tree sometimes produces timber worth milling, with a density of approximately 0.69 to 0.96 kg/L.

== Gallery ==
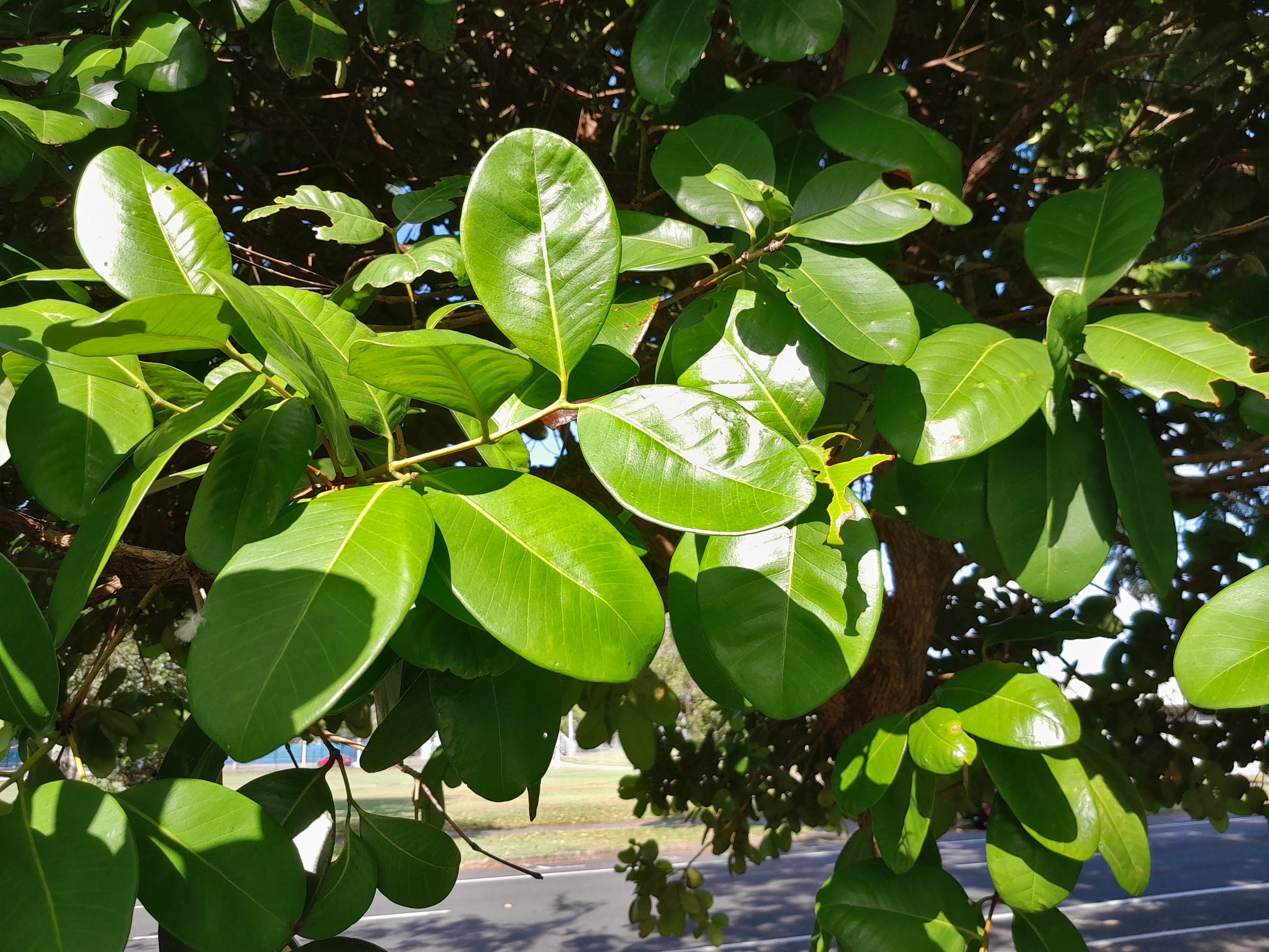
Foliage

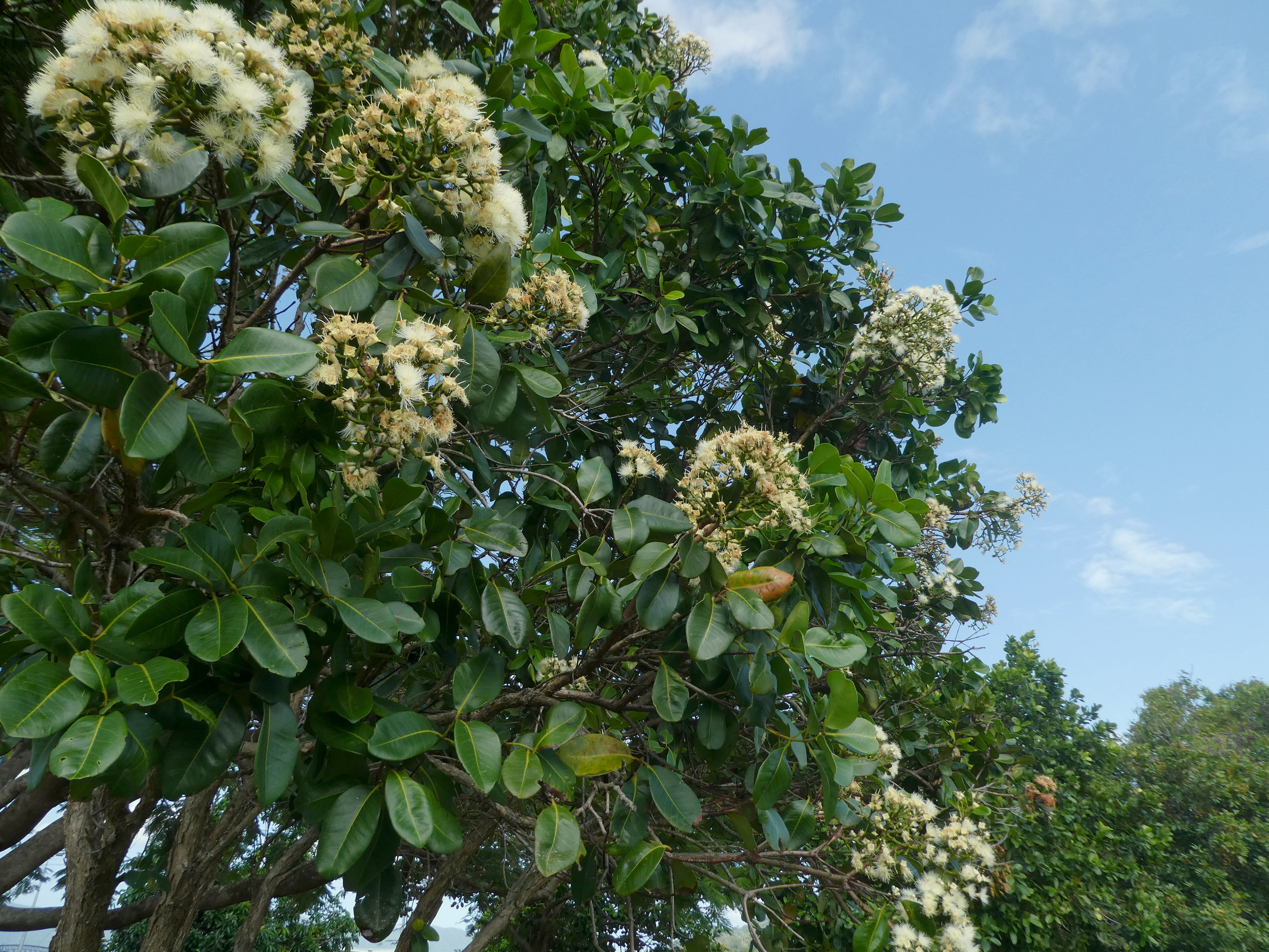
Flowering

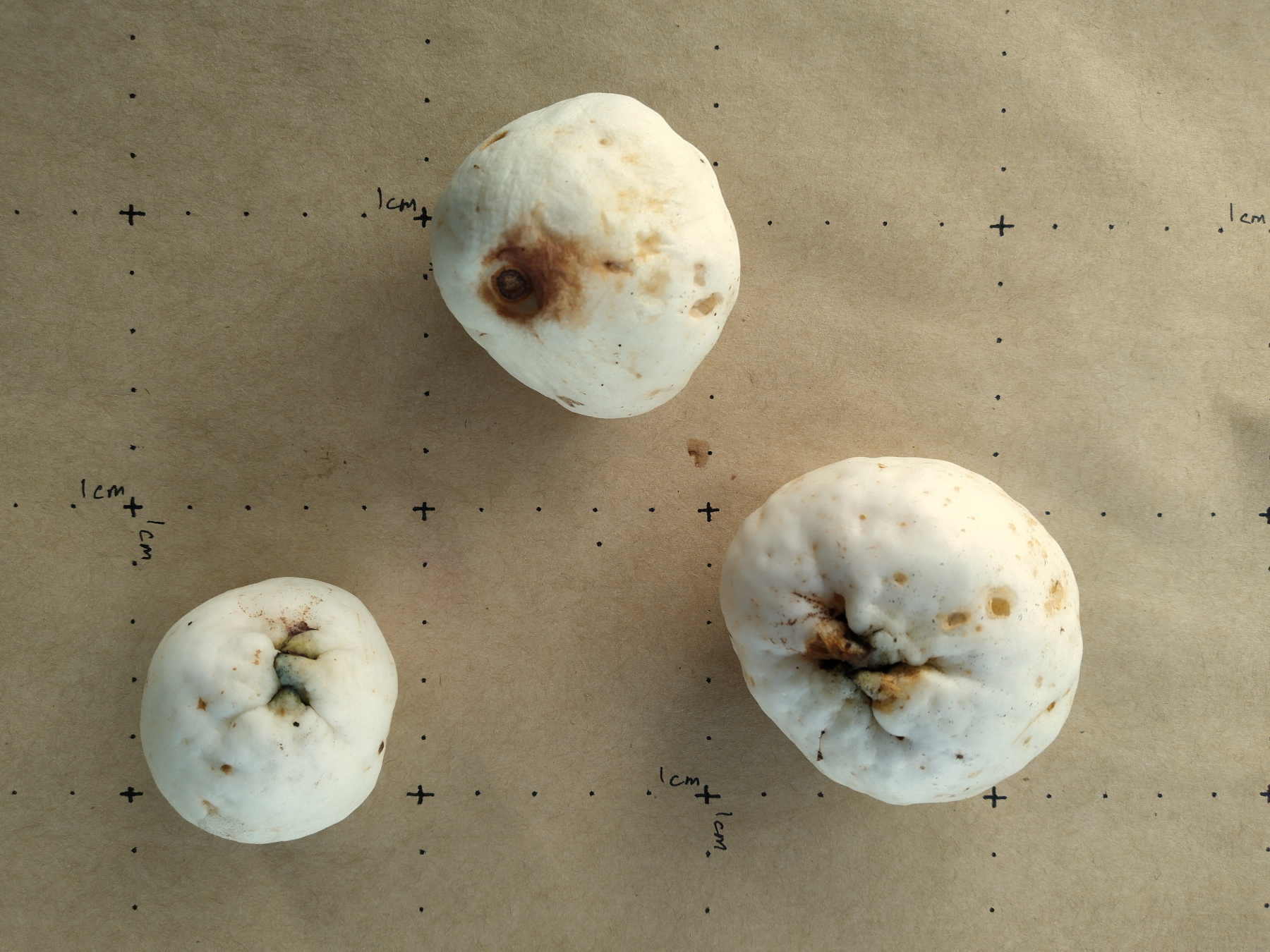
Fruit

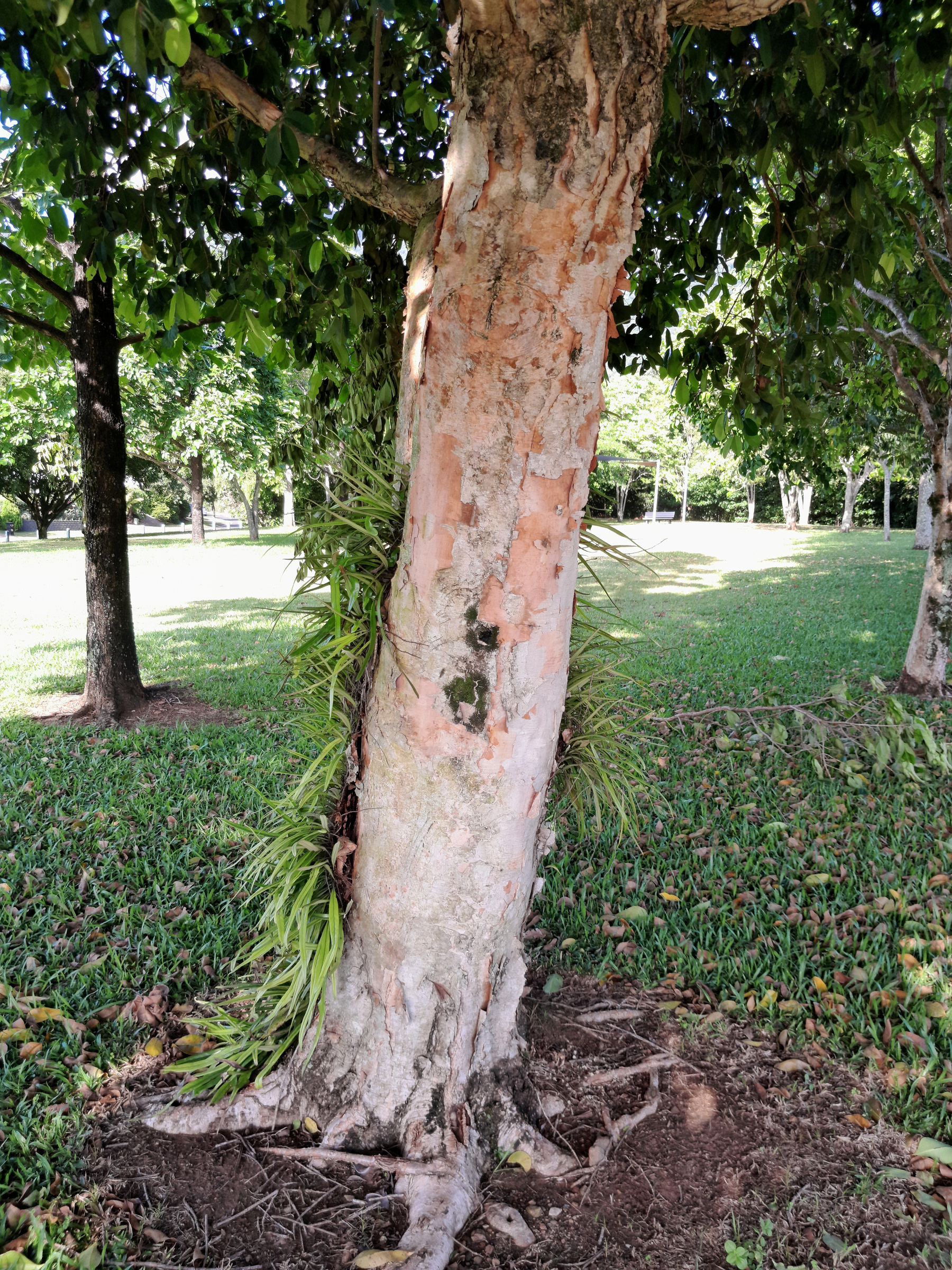
Trunk with papery bark

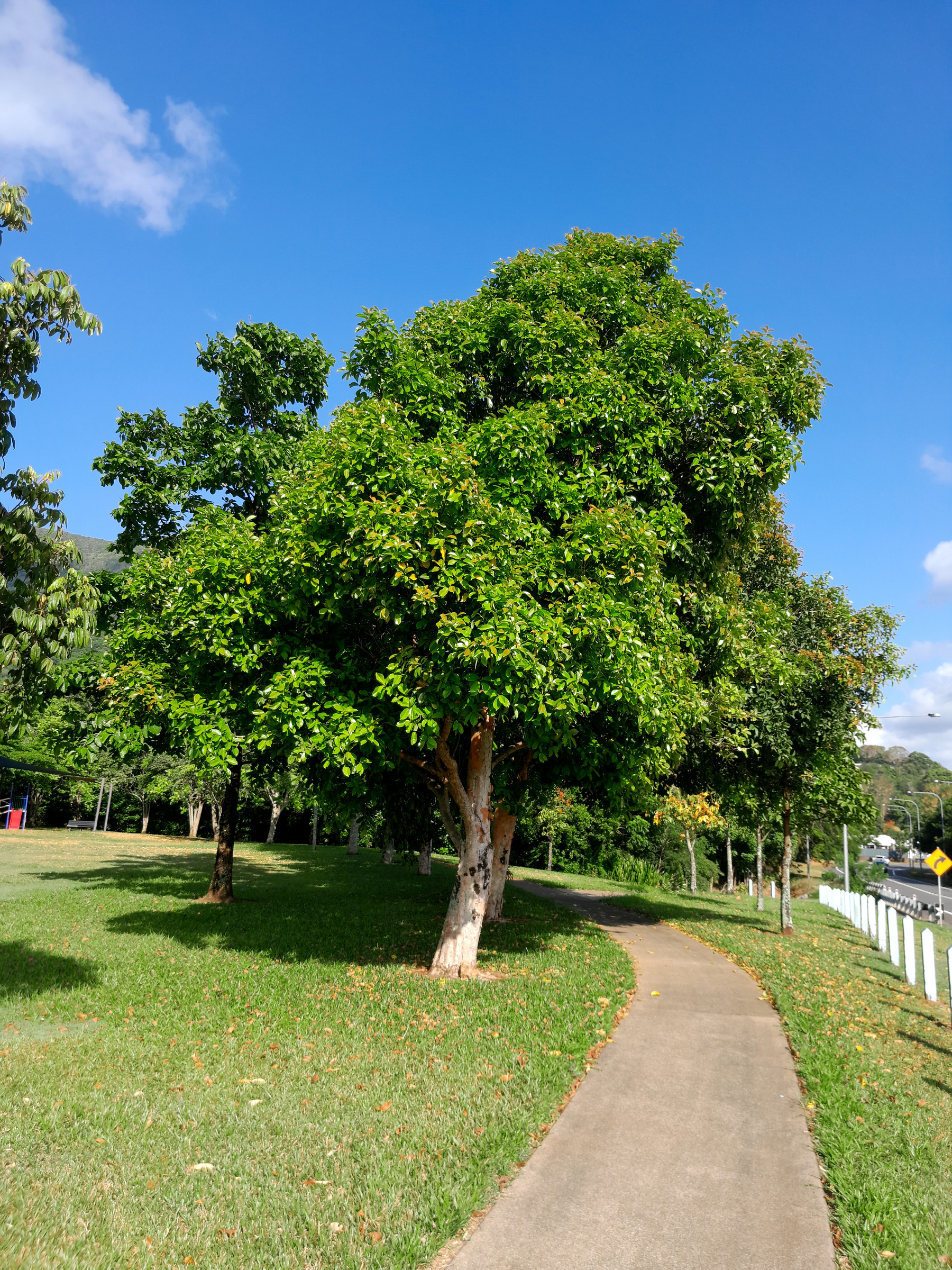
Park tree in Cairns

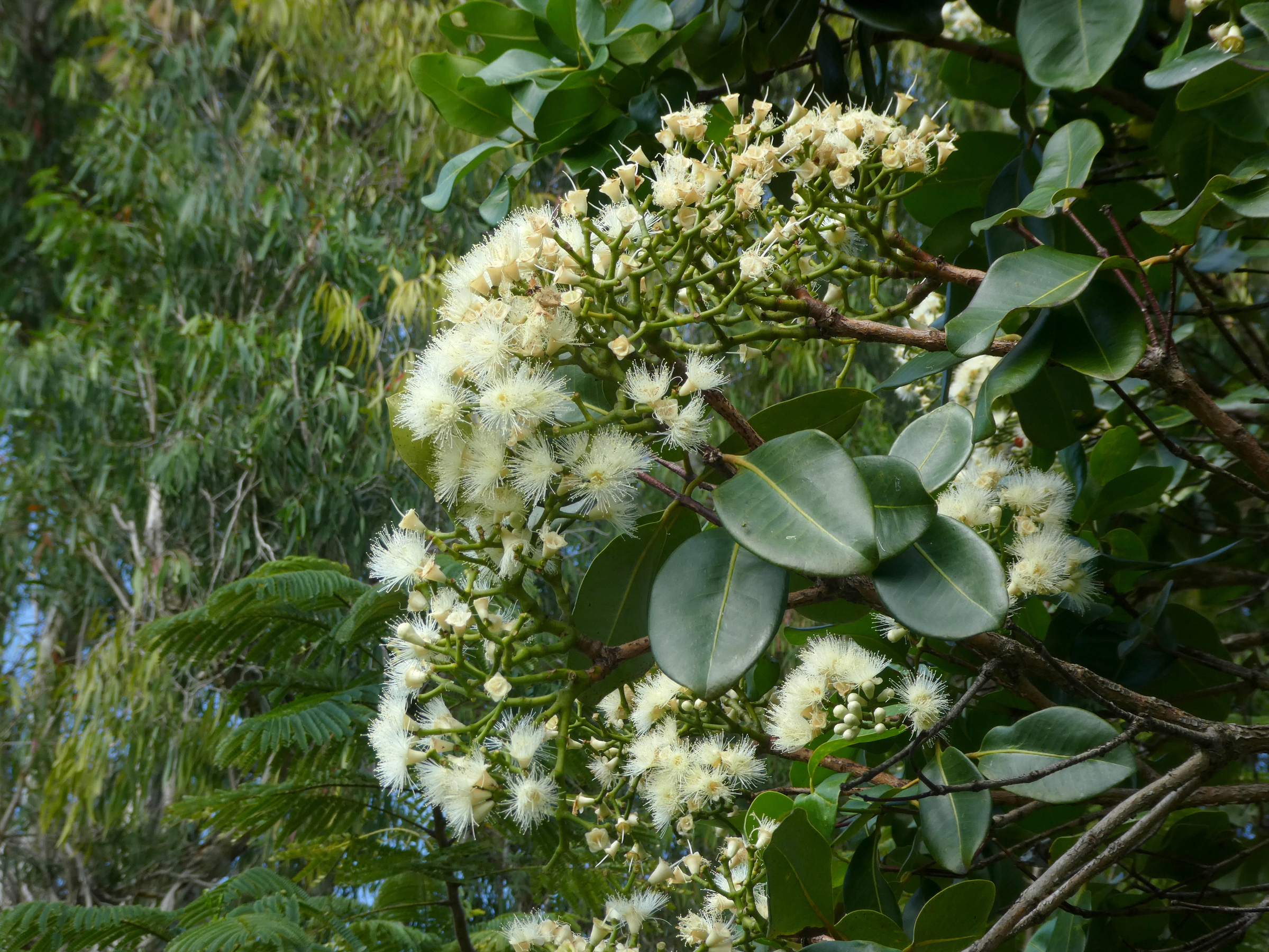
Inflorescence
