= Ngardok =

Indigenous Australian people

The Ngardok were an indigenous Australian people of the Northern Territory. Nothing is known of the language, which has been extinct since about World War II.

== Country ==
Norman Tindale calculated their land as extending over 200 square miles (520 km^{2}). They inhabited Field Island in Van Diemen Gulf as well as the scrub and swamplands of the adjacent continental coastal belt between the South Alligator River as far as Farewell Point near the mouth of the East Alligator River.

== Alternative names ==
- Ngardulk
- Ngadok
- Ngadug
- Ngadulg
- Ad-dok
- Gnaruk
- A'ragu
- Bimbirik (?)

== Sources ==
- "AIATSIS map of Indigenous Australia". AIATSIS.
- Berndt, Ronald M.; Berndt, Catherine (1947). "Discovery of Pottery in North-Eastern Arnhem Land". The Journal of the Royal Anthropological Institute of Great Britain and Ireland. 77 (2): 133–138. doi:10.2307/2844477. JSTOR 2844477.
- Earl, G. Windsor (1846). "On the Aboriginal Tribes of the Northern Coast of Australia". The Journal of the Royal Geographical Society of London. 16: 239–251. doi:10.2307/1798232. JSTOR 1798232.
- Spencer, Baldwin (1928). Wanderings in wild Australia (PDF). London: Macmillan Publishers.
- Tindale, Norman Barnett (1974). "Ngardok (NT)". Aboriginal Tribes of Australia: Their Terrain, Environmental Controls, Distribution, Limits, and Proper Names. Australian National University.
