= Woollybutt =

Woollybutt is a common name for several plants in the genus Eucalyptus and may refer to:

- Eucalyptus botryoides
- Eucalyptus delegatensis
- Eucalyptus miniata, Darwin woollybutt
- Eucalyptus longifolia, endemic to eastern Australia
