= Chambers Bay, Northern Territory =

Chambers Bay Northern Territory
- Coordinates: 12°13′00″S 131°35′02″E
- Time zone: ACST (UTC+9:30)
- Location: 100 km (62 mi) E of Darwin
- Territory electorate(s): Nelson
- Federal division(s): Lingiari

Chambers Bay is a locality in the Northern Territory of Australia about 100 kilometres (60 mi) east of Darwin, between Cape Hotham and Stuart Point. The bay is over 50 km long; a shallow shelving muddy beach peppered with mangroves, running east–west for most of its extent. It has no significant rivers or towns.

Chambers Bay is located within the federal division of Lingiari, the Northern Territory electoral division of Nelson and the local government area of the Litchfield Municipality.

== History ==
Chambers Bay is important in Australian history as the area where John McDouall Stuart's successful sixth expedition (crossing Australia south to north) terminated on 24 July 1862. The actual location, near Charles Creek (now named Thrings Creek, presumably for expedition member F. W. Thring), was marked by the initials "JMDS" carved into a tree, later replaced by an iron post. (Note: The Royal Geographical Society raised funds for an obelisk but demurred at the cost of transport and voted to leave that detail to the Government. No record of such an obelisk has been found, but the site is now an historical reserve, location 12.24328°S 131.90361°E, a few kilometres east of Stuart Point.)

The bay was named for

Miss Chambers, who kindly presented me with the flag which I have planted this day (Note: From Stuart's journal of 25 July 1862. The "Miss Chambers" could be James Chambers' eldest daughter Elizabeth Chambers (1837–1882), but he must have known she married John Holden Newman on 21 January 1862.)

of the Chambers family, who provided most of the finance for Stuart's expeditions.
