= Mount Bundey, Northern Territory =

Mount Bundey Northern Territory
- Coordinates: 13°02′05″S 131°43′08″E
- Population: 33 (2016 census)
- Established: 4 April 2007
- Postcode(s): 0822
- Time zone: ACST (UTC+9:30)
- Location: 115 km (71 mi) E of Darwin City
- LGA(s): unincorporated area
- Territory electorate(s): Goyder
- Federal division(s): Lingiari
Mean max temp	Mean min temp	Annual rainfall
33.1 °C; 92 °F	20.9 °C; 70 °F	1,434.5 mm 56.5 in
Suburbs around Mount Bundey:
Marrakai	Marrakai; Point Stuart	Kakadu
Marrakai; Margaret River	Mount Bundey	Kakadu
Margaret River	Burrundie; Kakadu	Kakadu
- Footnotes: Locations; Adjoining localities

Mount Bundey is a locality in the Northern Territory of Australia located about 115 kilometres (71 mi) east of the territory capital of Darwin.

The locality consists of land bounded to the north by the Arnhem Highway and to the east by the Kakadu National Park. The locality is named from a hill named Mount Bundey which itself is named after the cadastral unit of the Hundred of Bundey. Its boundaries and name were gazetted on 4 April 2007.

The Mount Bundey Training Area, an Australian Defence Force facility, occupies the eastern side of the locality.

The 2016 Australian census which was conducted in August 2016 reports that Mount Bundey had 33 people living within its boundaries.

Mount Bundey is located within the federal division of Lingiari, the territory electoral division of Goyder and within the unincorporated areas of the Northern Territory.
