= Billygoat plum =

Billygoat plum is a common name for several plants and may refer to:

- Planchonia careya
- Terminalia ferdinandiana, native to Australia
- Terminalia petiolaris
