= Djukbinj National Park =

National park in Australia

- IUCN category II (national park)
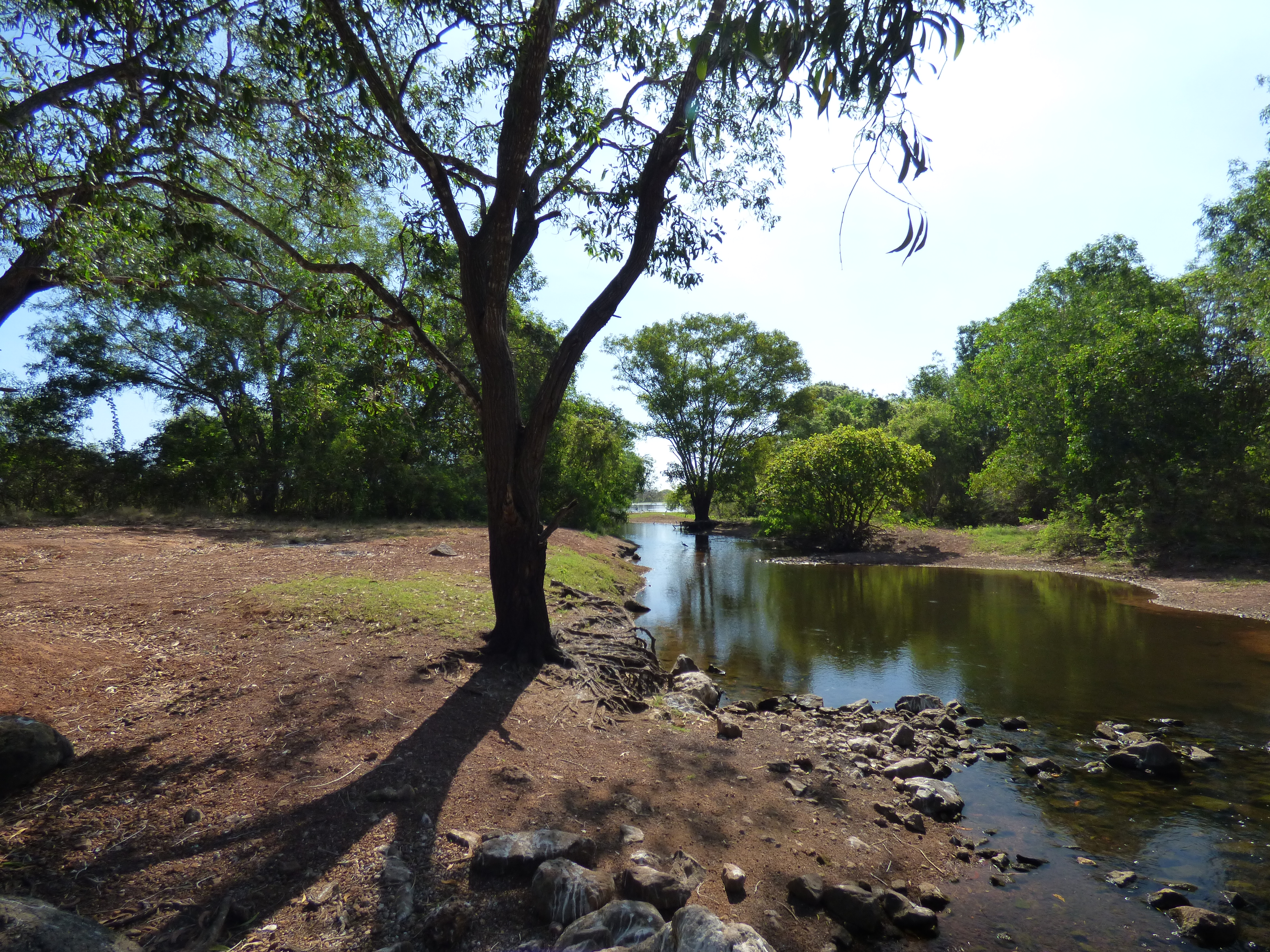

- Location within Northern Territory
- Location: Northern Territory
- Nearest city: Humpty Doo
- Coordinates: 12.579°S 131.435°E
- Area: 554.41 km^{2} (214.06 sq mi)
- Established: 27 March 1997
- Governing body: Parks and Wildlife Commission of the Northern Territory; Limilngan-Wulna Aboriginal Corporation
- Website: Official website

Djukbinj National Park is a protected area in the Northern Territory of Australia located about 66 km (41 mi) east-south-east of the territory capital of Darwin.

The national park was proclaimed on 3 April 1997 over land which has previous protected area status and which was part of the Wulna Land Claim - portion 1386 which was the former Escape Cliffs Historical Reserve, portion 2012 which was the former Cape Hotham Forest Reserve, portion 2017 which was the former Cape Hotham Conservation Reserve, and portions 4498, 4499 and 4707 which were parts of the former Marrakai Conservation Reserve.

After the settlement of the land claim, the Limilngan-Wulna Aboriginal Corporation leased the land back to the former Conservation Commission of the Northern Territory for it to use for "the purposes of a national park" following the signing of a joint management agreement on 7 November 1994.

Part of the land within the former Escape Cliffs Historical Reserve includes the site of the first attempt by the Government of South Australia to create a settlement in the Northern Territory and which was listed on the Northern Territory Heritage Register on 12 January 2000 under the name of Escape Cliffs.

== See also ==
- Protected areas of the Northern Territory
