= Mary River National Park =

National park in the Northern Territory, Australia

- IUCN category II (national park)
- Location within Northern Territory
- Location: Northern Territory
- Nearest city: Humpty Doo
- Coordinates: 12°42′S 131°43′E
- Area: 1,215.25 km^{2} (469.21 sq mi)
- Established: 20 May 1966
- Visitors: 336,400 (in 2017)
- Governing body: Parks and Wildlife Commission of the Northern Territory
- Website: Official website

Mary River National Park is an Australian national park located about 100 kilometres (62 mi) east and stretching to the southeast of Darwin in the Northern Territory.

== Wildlife ==
The national park is inhabited by several bird species and saltwater crocodiles.

== See also ==
- Protected areas of the Northern Territory
- Wildman River Wilderness Work Camp
