= Mary River (Northern Territory) =

Mary
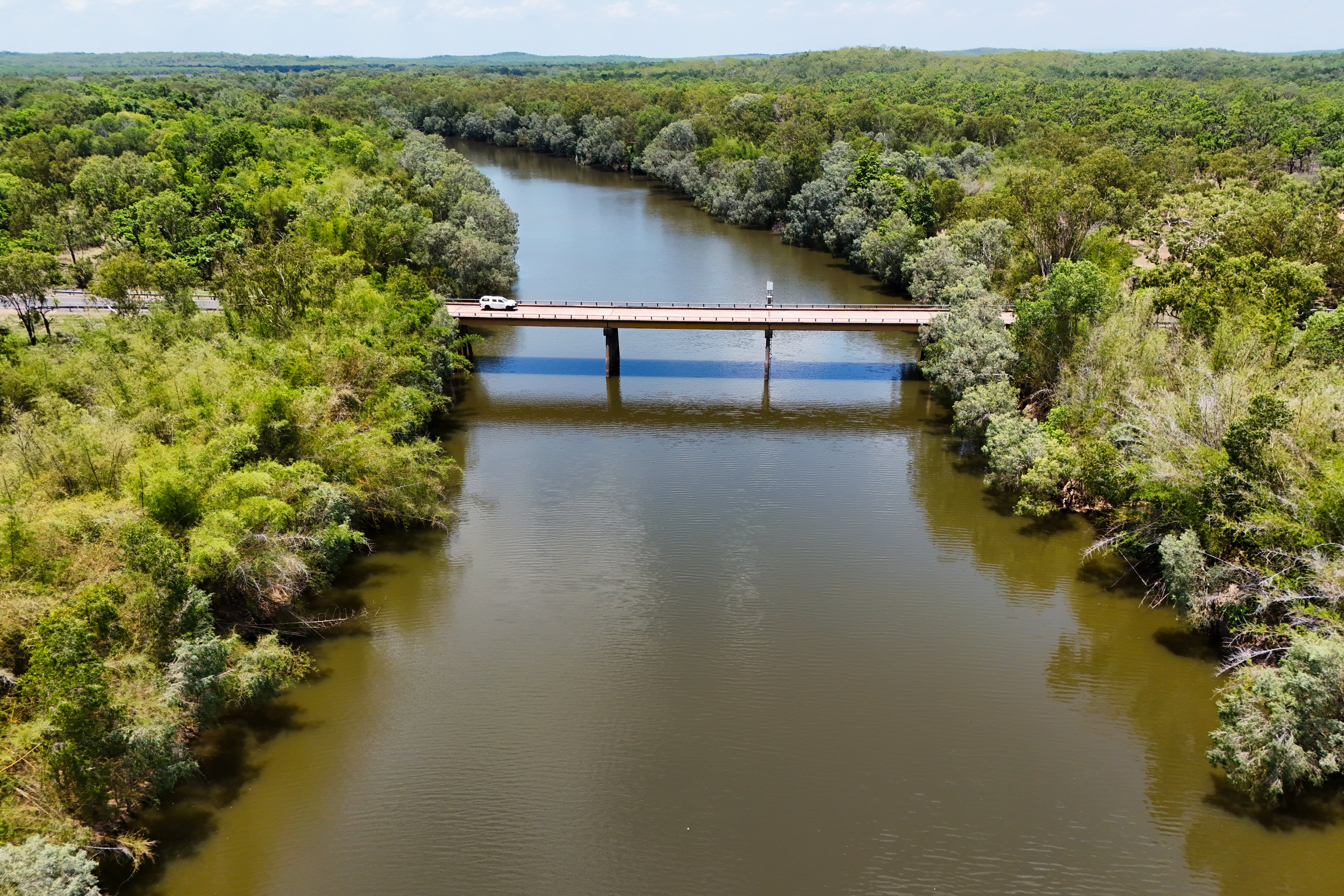

- Location of the Mary River mouth in the Northern Territory
- Etymology: Mary Chambers

Location
- Country: Australia
- Territory: Northern Territory

Physical characteristics
- Source
  - location: Arnhem Land, Australia
  - elevation: 295 m (968 ft)
- Mouth
  - location: Sampan Creek, Arnhem Land, Australia
  - coordinates: 12°26′9″S 131°42′58″E
  - elevation: 1.5 m (4 ft 11 in)
- Length: 225 km (140 mi)
- Basin size: 8,000 km^{2} (3,100 sq mi)
- Discharge
  - average: 76.1 m^{3}/s (2,690 cu ft/s)

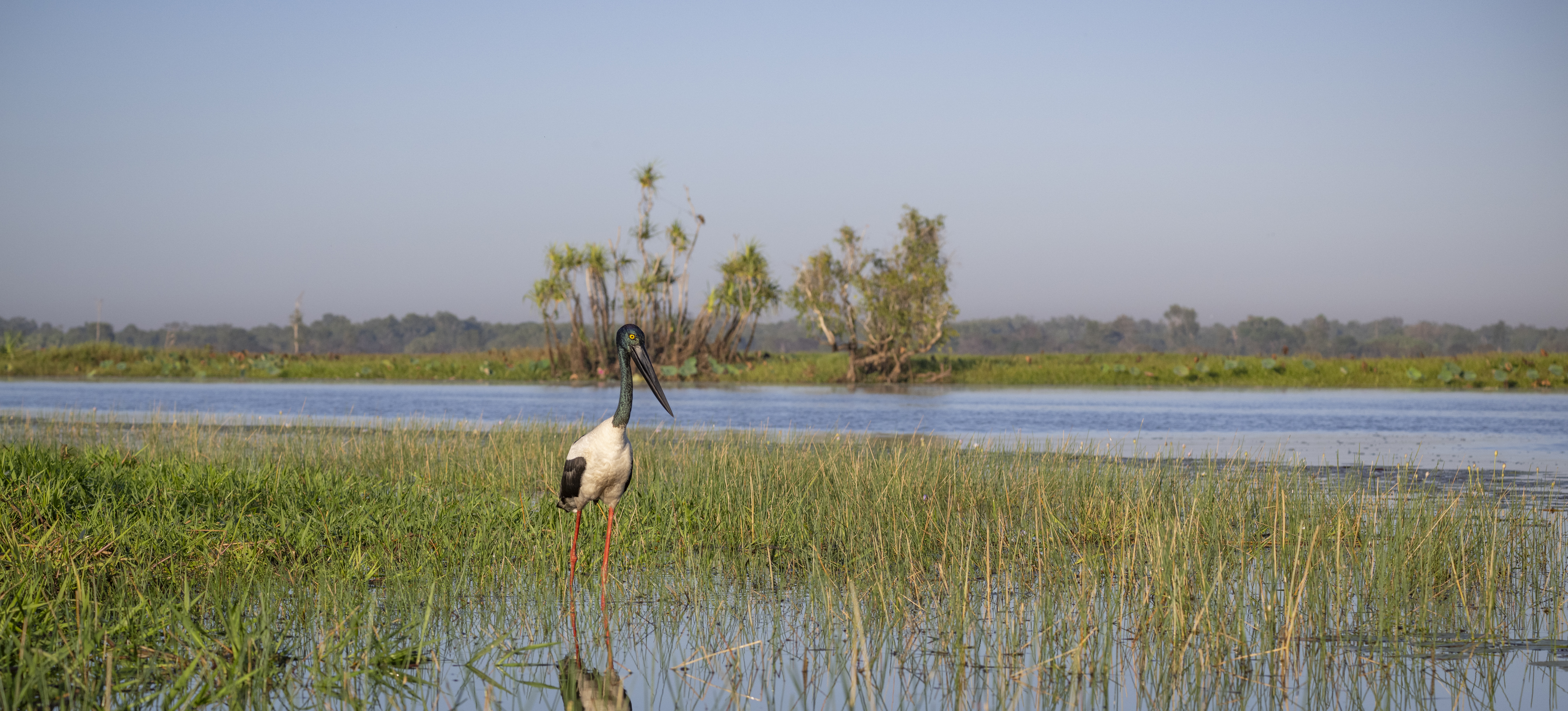
A black-necked stork on the Mary River

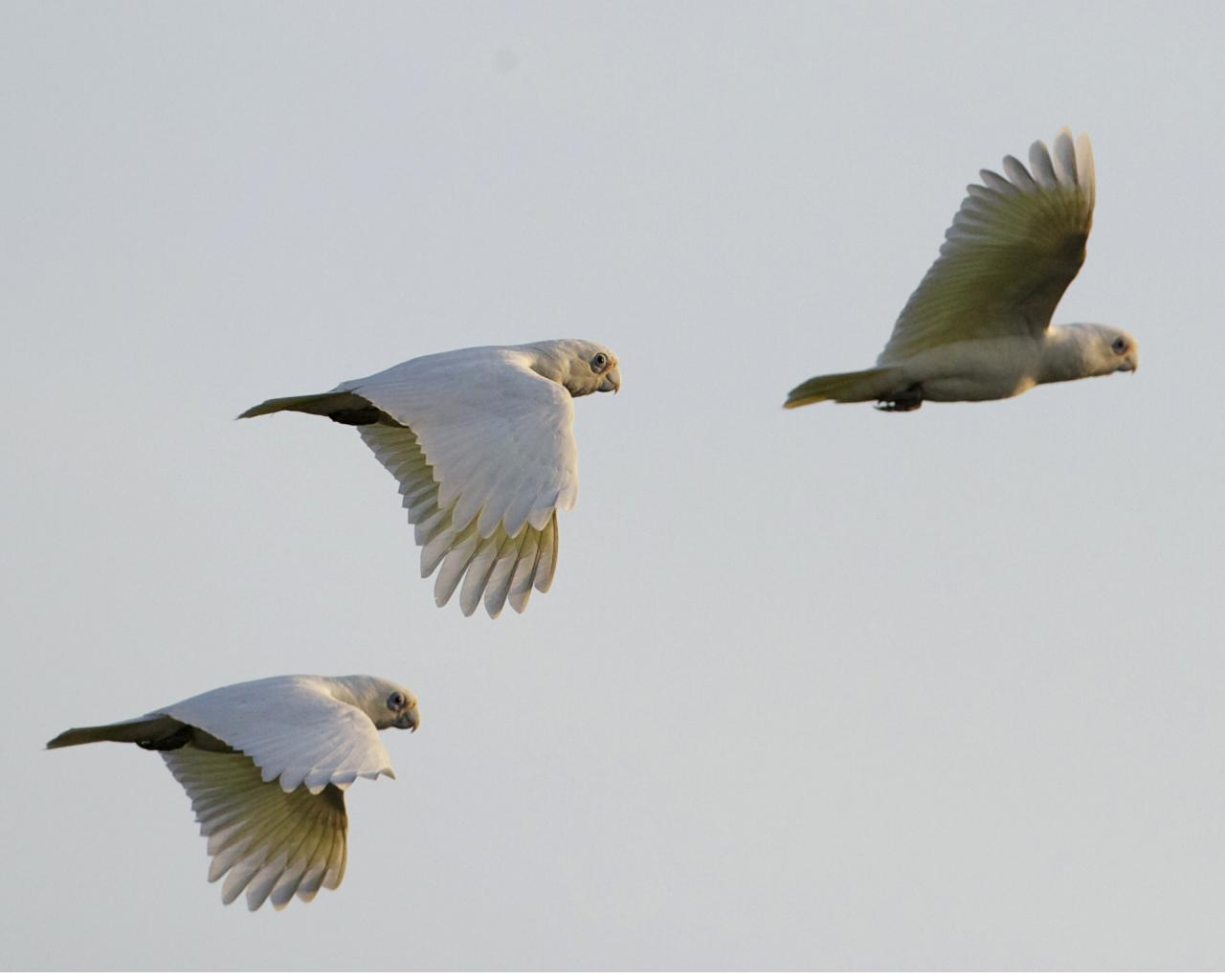
Little corellas flying at Mary River National Park

The Mary River flows in the Northern Territory of Australia and is a site of the Mary River National Park.

== Description ==
The river is approximately 225 kilometres (140 mi) long and rises about 50 kilometres (31 mi) east of Pine Creek. The catchment area is over 8,000 square kilometres (3,089 sq mi) but is ephemeral and only flows in the wet season, during the dry it is a series of pools and billabongs.

The catchment has several small reserve areas forming the Mary River National Park to help protect it. The Arnhem Highway crosses the river near one of the park areas. It also supports multiple land uses including pastoralism, fishing, mining, defence force, tourism, conservation, and horticulture. Pastoralism, particularly cattle grazing is the dominant use, taking up 63% of the catchment area.

The river has a total of ten tributaries, including the Little Mary River, MacKinlay River, Bowerbird Creek, Mingloo Creek and Douglas Creek. It has a mean annual outflow of 2,400 gigalitres (3.139×10^{9} cu yd).

Its lower reaches form part of the Adelaide and Mary River Floodplains Important Bird Area. The river is noted for its population of saltwater crocodiles, and is a breeding area for barramundi, the target fish species for recreational anglers in the area. It is one of eight rivers in the Northern Territory with a large floodplain system in their catchment area. The wetlands occupy an area of approximately 1,300 square kilometres (502 sq mi) and are predominantly freshwater, although they suffer from saltwater intrusion. The wetlands provide a mosaic of habitats and are listed in the Directory of Important Wetlands. It is almost unique for an Australian river in that it has had no major tidal estuary as a river outlet for at least the last 2,000 years.

== Flora and fauna ==
The Mary River floodplains form a vital habitat in the dry season for some 250 species of birds including jabiru, jacana, brolga and pygmy geese.

Four threatened plants are found along the river including Goodenia quadrifida, Schoutenia ovata and the endangered Cycas armstrongii and Helicteres macrothrix.

The riparian vegetation found on the upper catchment includes mixed woodlands of pandanus, wattle, paperbark and freshwater mangroves with an understorey of grass and sedges. Weeds are becoming problematic with shrub horehounds, spiny head sida and wild passion fruit vine featuring.

34 species of fish are found in the river, including the Macleay's glassfish, barred grunter, sooty grunter, fly-specked hardyhead, toothless catfish, flathead goby, spangled perch, barramundi, oxeye herring, rainbowfish, black-banded rainbowfish, northern trout gudgeon, bony bream, catfish, Hyrtl's tandan, freshwater longtom, seven-spot archerfish and the sleepy cod.

Two threatened goanna species, Varanus mertensi and Varanus panoptes, are found along the river, as is the vulnerable yellow-snouted gecko (Lucasium occultum).

== History ==
The traditional owners of the area are the Wulwulam people in the south and the Limilngan people in the Northern floodplain country.

The river was named by John McDouall Stuart in 1862. He wrote in his diary "Country burning all round. Lat 13°38'24". This branch I have named the Mary, in honour of Miss Mary Chambers." Stuart always believed that the Mary was a branch of the Adelaide river and always referred to it as "The Mary, Adelaide river".

== See also ==
- List of rivers of Australia § Northern Territory
