= Darwin Region languages =

Australian Aboriginal language family

Darwin Region
- (proposed)
- Geographic distribution: from Darwin area to the West Alligator River
- Linguistic classification: Proposed language family.
- Subdivisions: Laragiya; Limilngan; Umbugarla ?

Language codes
- Glottolog: None lara1258 (Laragia) limi1242 (Limilngan-Wulna) umbu1235 (Umbugarla)
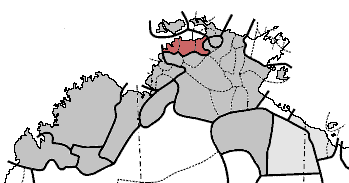
- Darwin Region languages (red), among other non-Pama–Nyungan languages (grey).

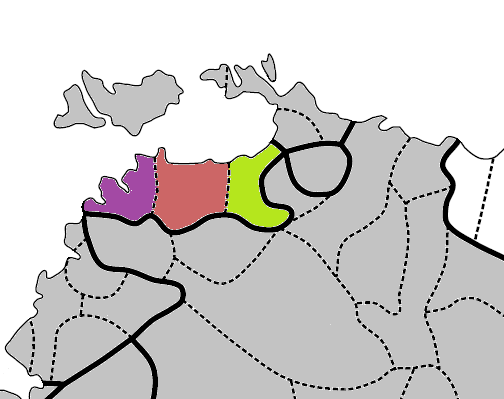
- Closeup. From west to east they are: Laragiya, Limilngan, and Umbugarlic.

The Darwin Region languages are a family of Australian Aboriginal languages of northern Australia proposed by linguist Mark Harvey. It unites the pair of Limilngan languages with two language isolates:

- Darwin Region
  - Laragiya (nearly extinct)
  - Limilngan
    - Limilngan †
    - Wulna †
  - Umbugarlic
    - Umbugarla †
    - ?Ngurmbur †
    - ?Bugurnidja †

Ngurmbur and Bugurnidja are poorly attested extinct languages, which are joined with Umbugarla to form the Umbugarlic branch.

Tryon (2007) lists the following varieties of Umbugarla–Ngumbur:

Ngunbudj (Gonbudj), Umbugarla, Bugunidja, Ngarduk, Ngumbur.

However, nothing is known of Ngunbudj or Ngarduk, which were extinct by World War II.
