= Adelaide River =

Adelaide River Windindin
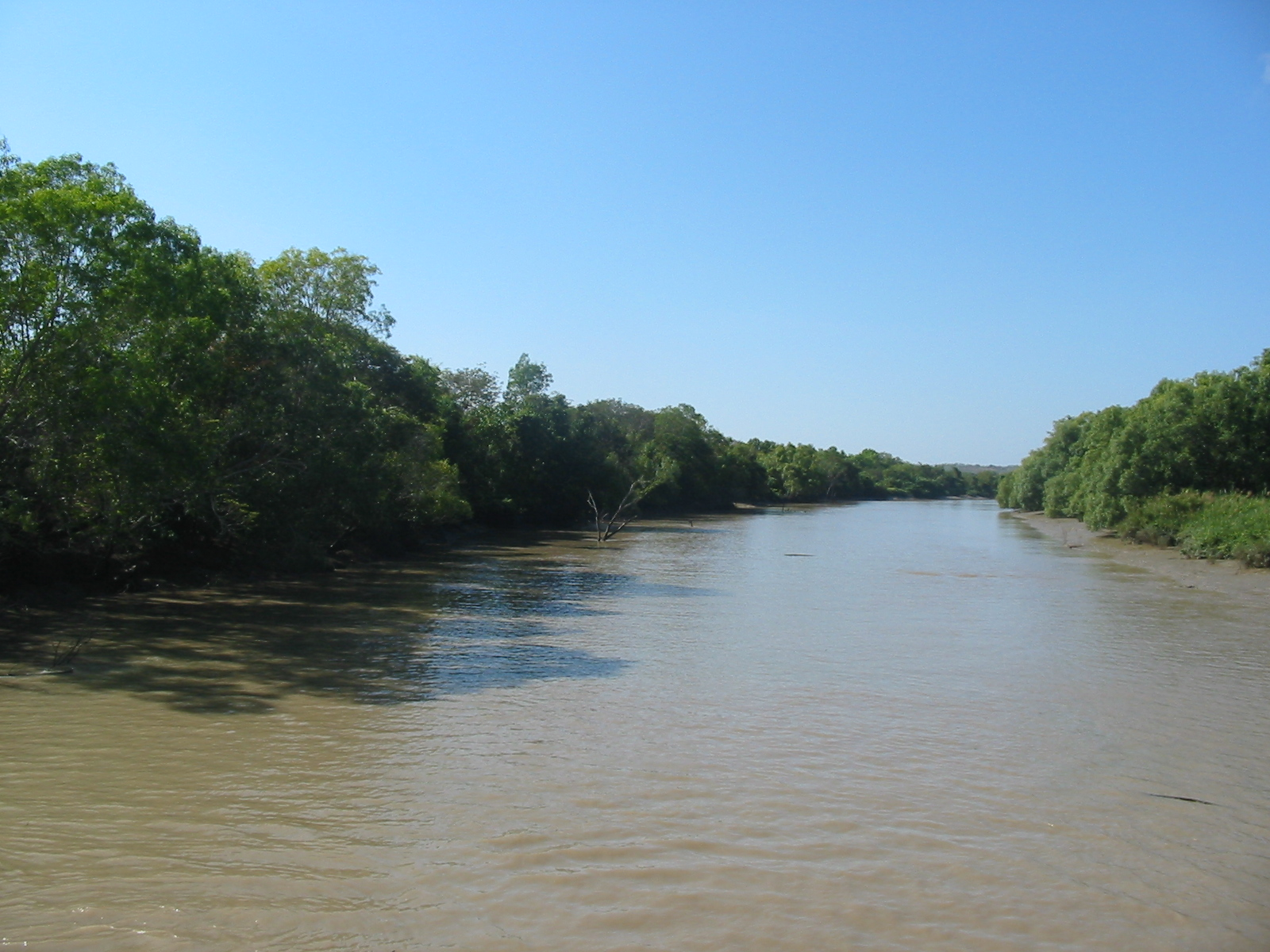
- The Adelaide River

- Location of the Adelaide River mouth in the Northern Territory
- Etymology: Queen Adelaide
- Native name: Windindin (Wulna)

Location
- Country: Australia
- Territory: Northern Territory
- LGA: Coomalie, Litchfield
- Townships: Adelaide River

Physical characteristics
- Source
  - elevation: 149 m (489 ft)
- Mouth: Adam Bay
  - location: Clarence Strait
  - coordinates: 12°13′12″S 131°13′57″E
  - elevation: 0 m (0 ft)
- Length: 238 km (148 mi)
- Basin size: 7,640 km^{2} (2,950 sq mi)
- Discharge
  - average: 1,980 m^{3}/s (70,000 cu ft/s)

Basin features
- National park: Litchfield National Park

The Adelaide River is a river in the Northern Territory of Australia.

== Course and features ==
The river rises in the Litchfield National Park and flows generally northwards to Clarence Strait, joined by eight tributaries including the west branch of the Adelaide River, Coomalie Creek, Margaret River and Marrakai Creek, before discharging into its mouth in Adam Bay in the Clarence Strait. The river descends 151 metres (495 ft) over its 238-kilometre (148 mi) course. The catchment area of the river is 7,640 square kilometres (2,950 sq mi).

The Adelaide River is crossed by both the Stuart Highway, adjacent to the township of Adelaide River, and the Arnhem Highway near Humpty Doo.

== Fauna ==
The Adelaide River is well known for its high concentration of saltwater crocodiles, along with other wildlife including white-bellied sea eagles, whistling kites, freshwater crocodiles, bull sharks and black flying-fox. Its lower reaches form part of the Adelaide and Mary River Floodplains Important Bird Area. Waters of this river are also home to endangered speartooth shark and critically endangered largetooth sawfish. The river also contains a notable introduced population of Siamese fighting fish.

== History ==
Indigenous Australians including the Woolna, Warray and Kungarakan owned the lands among the river for millennia.

Lieutenant Fitzmaurice, under the command of John Lort Stokes, sighted the river on a boating expedition. The expedition was part of the Admiralty surveying ship HMS Beagle's voyage in 1839, and the river was named in honour of Queen Adelaide.

== Gallery ==
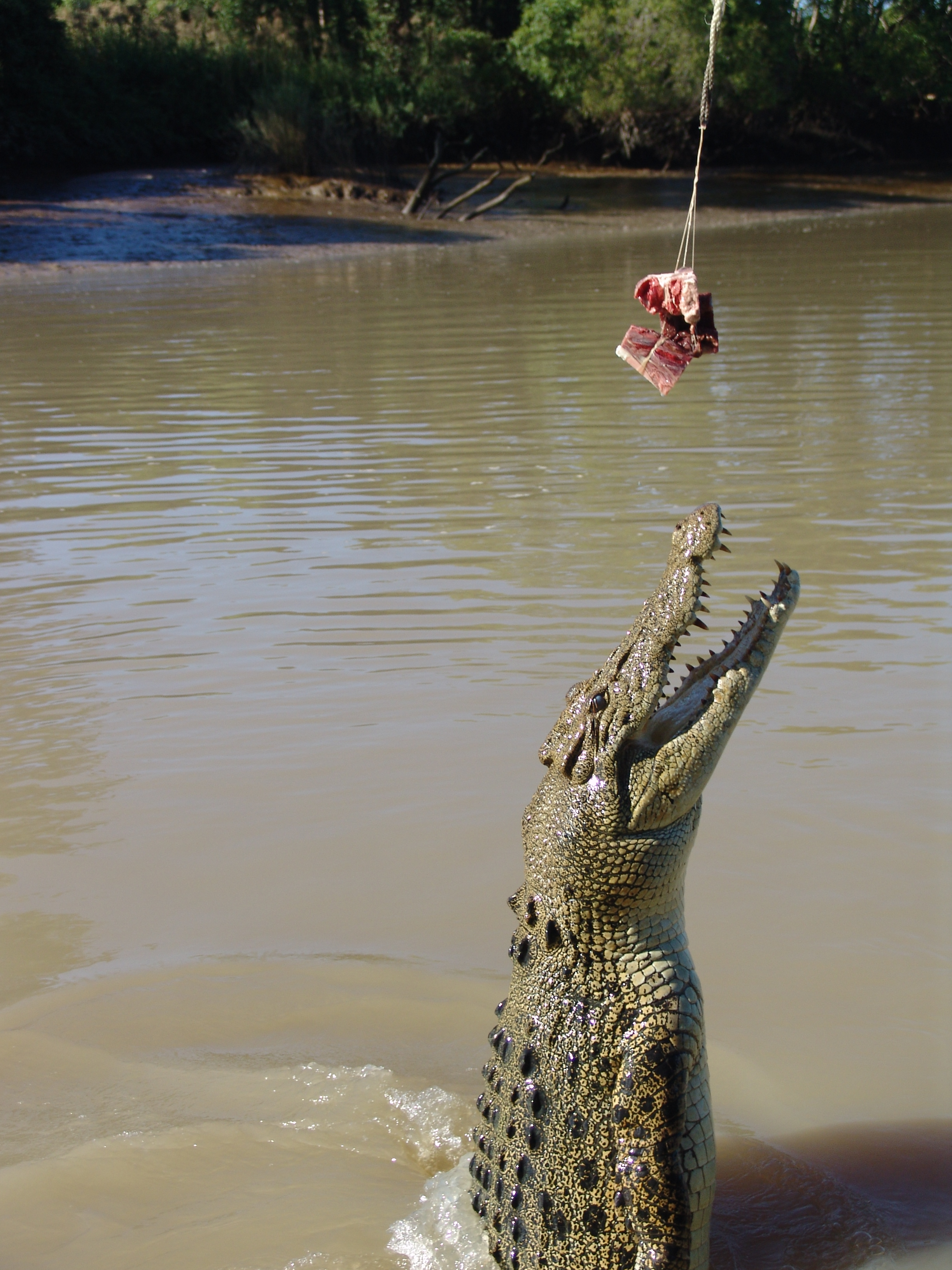
Jumping crocodile at Adelaide River

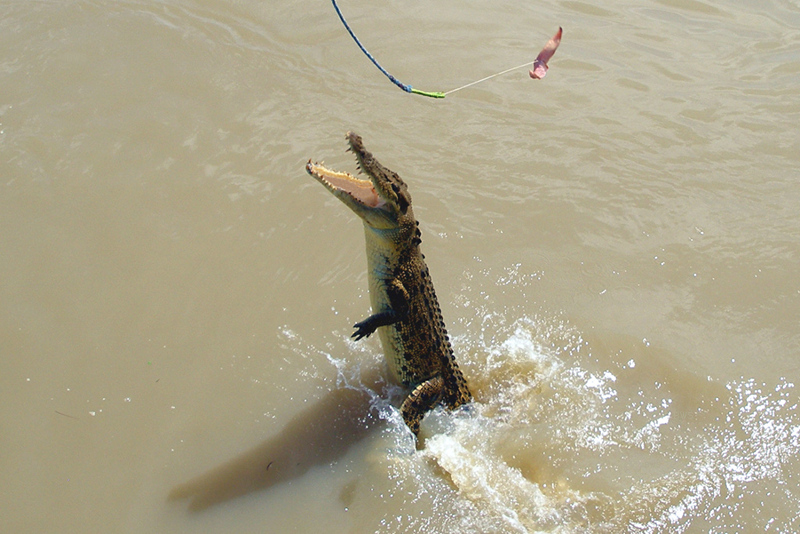
Croc whips tail to leap high but misses bait

A video taken on Adelaide River

== See also ==
- List of rivers of Australia § Northern Territory
- Naval Base Darwin
