= James Millner (doctor) =

English doctor and administrator (1830–1875

J. Stokes Millner
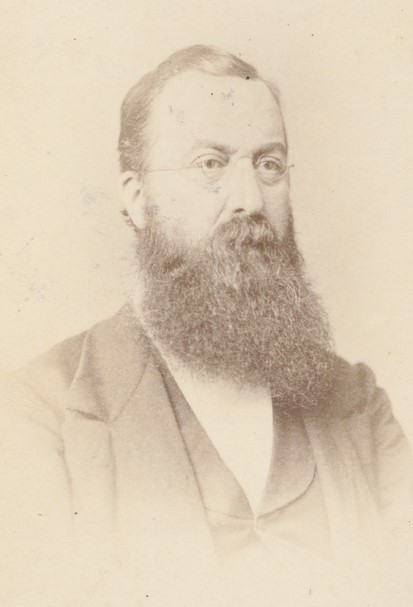
- Born: 1830; Birmingham; England
- Died: 25 February 1875 (aged 44–45); Great Barrier Reef, Queensland
- Years active: 1855 to 1875
- Known for: Early pioneer / settler of Australia
- Medical career
- Profession: Surgeon

James Stokes Millner (1830 – 25 February 1875) was a medical practitioner and administrator in the early history of the Northern Territory of Australia.

== Early life ==
Dr J. Stokes Millner (as he was generally known) was born in Birmingham, England in 1830, the second son of Thomas and Eleanor Millner according to the 1841 census. He was educated at Marischal College, University of Aberdeen: licentiate of faculty of physicians and surgeons and was trained as a surgeon.

== Life in Australia ==
Millner immigrated to Australia in 1855, arriving at Port Adelaide on 24 August aboard the barque Lismoyne. Prior to settling in Adelaide, Dr Millner was engaged as ship's surgeon, travelling around the world and working on several immigrant vessels between England and Adelaide. After settling in South Australia, Dr Millner practised at Port Adelaide, Angaston and Gawler. In 1861 and 1862, Millner was an elected Alderman on the Port Adelaide Council.

=== Northern Territory ===
Millner was appointed Surgeon to the McKinlay party to the Northern Territory, whose brief was to investigate alternative sites for "Palmerston", the proposed new settlement, independent of the work being done by Finniss at Escape Cliffs. The party left Port Adelaide by the ship Ellen Lewis on 25 September 1865 and arrived at Adam Bay on 5 November. He transferred to the Escape Cliffs settlement party as Surgeon and Protector of Aborigines, replacing Dr Goldsmith, whose resignation Finniss, the Government Resident, had requested and received. Finniss himself had been recalled, so Millner was to work under Manton, his replacement. That party, Millner included, was recalled to South Australia in November 1866, and the site was abandoned, the men returning to Adelaide on 2 February 1867.

On 22 January 1870, Doctor Millner arrived in Darwin on the barque Kohinoor as Acting Government Resident of the Northern Territory of South Australia. His commencing annual salary was listed at £500. As the South Australian Government's representative in the Northern Territory, he had jurisdiction over a white population of just forty-four, until the arrival of South Australia's substantive Government Resident. Millner was described as a tall man, heavily bearded, with thinning hair, who always wore glasses.

Doctor Millner was given several roles including; Protector of Aborigines, quarantine officer and registrar of births and deaths, as well as caring for the sick and injured, being the only doctor in the Northern Territory. Doctor Millner established good relations with the local aborigine people, who soon realised he had skills and knowledge they could use. In December 1872 his wife Esther (née Sanders) died at Yankalilla, south of Adelaide, having suffered from a heart condition for some time. A few days later Doctor Millner tendered his resignation. In 1874 he was back in South Australia, where in April he remarried, to Elizabeth (née Wood). The following month Doctor Millner, his new wife and the three children of his first marriage (Grace Maude, Esther Eustace and William Sturt) boarded the Gothenburg for Darwin, where he resumed his modified appointment.

In 1874, under Doctor Millner's authority, the first hospital was opened in Packard Street above Doctors Gully.

=== Last days ===
In February 1875, after five years service in the north, Doctor Millner resigned and was returning to Adelaide with his wife and four children aboard the SS Gothenburg. On the evening of 24 February 1875, off the north Queensland coast, the Gothenburg hit a section of the Great Barrier Reef near Holbourne Island, during a cyclone. Early the next morning, Doctor Millner and all his family drowned, along with about 100 other passengers and crew.

== Legacy ==
The following places are all named after James Millner:

- The northern Darwin suburb of Millner.
- Millner Street in Millner.
- The Electoral division of Millner.

== Gallery ==
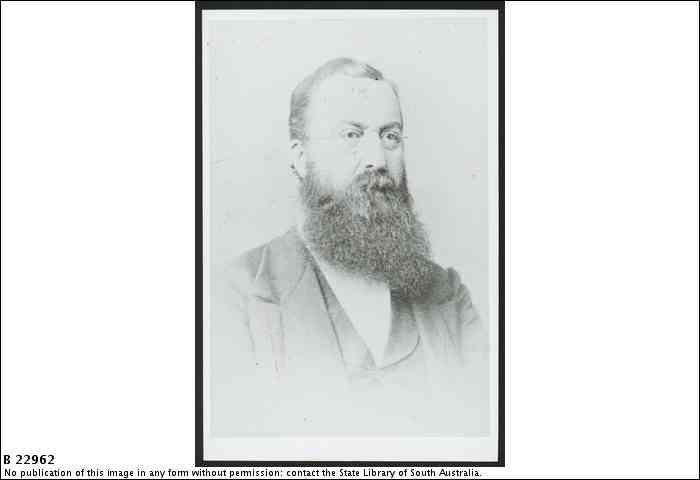
Dr. James Stokes Millner

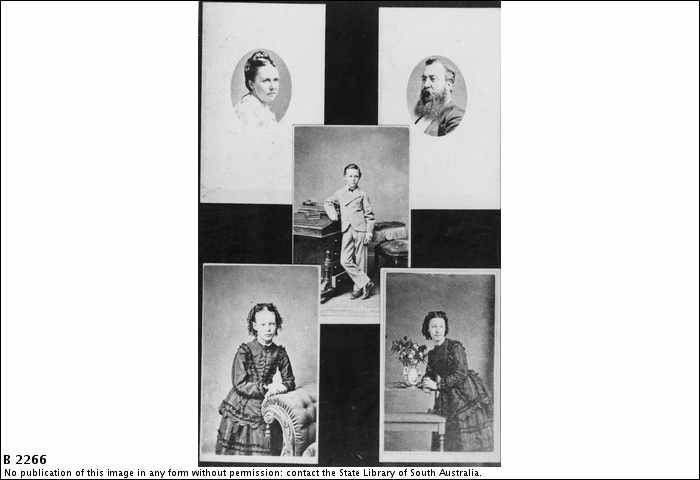
The Millner Family in 1870

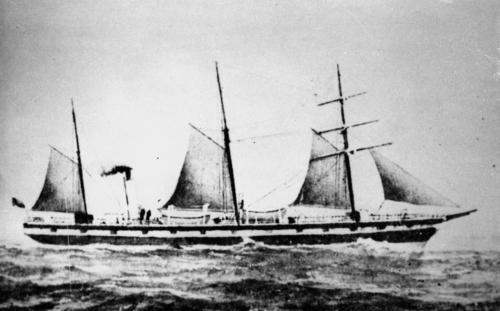
SS Gothenburg

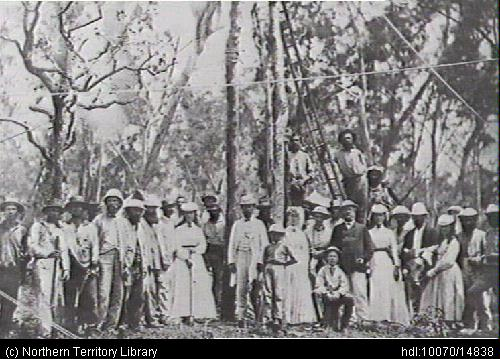
Planting the first telegraph pole, near Palmerston (Darwin) in September 1870. James Millner is fourth from left
