= Francis Edward Goldsmith =

Francis Edward Goldsmith MRCSL (1825 – 24 July 1875), often referred to as Edward Goldsmith, was a medical doctor in South Australia remembered for his time as the first surgeon and Protector of Aborigines of the pioneering settlement at Escape Cliffs, Northern Territory of Australia under B. T. Finniss. Within a year Finniss had demanded his resignation, citing insubordination.

== History ==
Goldsmith was the youngest son of John Goldsmith (1787–1825) and Emma Goldsmith, née Willan (c. 1787–1830). He qualified in London as a surgeon, and travelled to Australia as surgeon on the ship True Briton, 1,200 tons, G. H. Bawn master, arriving in Melbourne in September 1862.

In December 1862 he moved to South Australia by the Havilah and settled in Yankalilla, South Australia, where Rev. Charles Henry Goldsmith (c. 1824 – 20 June 1912) was the Wesleyan Methodist minister. It is likely that Charles was his brother.

He was in March 1864 appointed JP for South Australia, also to be Surgeon and Protector of Aborigines attached to the Northern Territory expedition a party of 40 under B. T. Finniss, which on 29 April left for Adam Bay, Northern Territory on the barque Henry Ellis with the task of choosing and surveying a site for a principal town to be called Palmerston.

Relations between Goldsmith and Colonel Finniss, leader of the party and Government Resident, were never cordial, and on several occasions actions by Goldsmith were viewed by Finniss as insubordination:

- The only significant piece of work accomplished by the party in the first six months was construction of a house for the Government Resident. When it was nearly completed, Goldsmith put the dying worker E. J. Wilson in one of the rooms, which was cooler than any of the tents. Finniss demanded he be removed, but the doctor was adamant, and Wilson died there a few days later.
- To alleviate a shortage of drinking water, a well was dug, but the water had a greenish tinge and smelled of hydrogen sulphide, and after several cases of stomach pain Goldsmith pronounced it unsafe to drink, contradicting Finniss's stated opinion. Finniss had for himself several tanks of rainwater, collected from the roof of his residence. Surveyor George Warland, one of those affected by the well water, was caught helping himself to the rainwater and upbraided within hearing of other officers.
- During an absence by Finniss, leaving Manton in charge, an Aboriginal raiding party plundered a quantity supplies that had been left unprotected on the river bank. On 9 August 1864 a party of four on horseback left to recover the goods, but were repulsed by spear-wielding warriors, who wounded Pearson and his horse quite badly. An armed party arrived on foot, covering the riders' retreat. An Aboriginal man was shot and killed by Alaric Ward.

A month later, Aborigines from the Chambers Bay region speared several horses, and Finniss deputized his son Frederick to lead a retribution party against them. Goldsmith requested inclusion in the party, but was ordered to remain at the depot. Before the party arrived, the natives had all vanished except for an old man who had been gathering yams. He was shot in the back by W. P. Auld, then the party destroyed their camp and set fire to the shelters. Finniss welcomed them back as conquering heroes and treated them to a tot of rum each. Goldsmith had applied to Finniss to take part in the expedition, but was refused, and gave his opinion that the death might have been avoided had he been present.

Advertisements appeared in the Adelaide papers of February 1865 for a Surgeon and Protector of Aborigines, Goldsmith's appointed position. Goldsmith respectfully asked Finniss for an explanation and was told it was not in his power to give him an explanation. Goldsmith tendered his resignation, which was accepted immediately, and left Adam Bay aboard Bengal for Surabaya in company with surveyor Pearson, and storekeeper King, both on sick leave. Also on board were several whose annual contract had expired and refused offers of extension. W. P. Auld, John LeM. F. Roberts, W. Read (killed by a crocodile while working on the Overland Telegraph), William Smith, James Gilbert, R. J. Ware, G. F. Edmunds and Firmin Deacon (who both had arrived by South Australian) a few weeks earlier, and J. R. Atkinson and G. T. Cottrell. Those last two went on to Singapore, the rest to Melbourne aboard the steamer Douglas, and then to Adelaide. Before the ship left, Goldsmith was presented with a testimonial signed by all the officers and nearly all the men. Having resigned rather than be sacked, Goldsmith was responsible for the cost of his return to Adelaide. In December 1865 Finniss appointed Dr. Belgrave Ninnis, surgeon of HMS Beatrice, to the dual positions.

On his return from the Territory, Goldsmith practised in Magill, then in Robe, where in 1866 he was appointed to the South Australian Regiment of Volunteer Cavalry, No. 3, or Robe Troop, as Surgeon.

Around 1869 he developed a form of paralysis, and as a chronic invalid, was forced to abandon his profession, and died in the Adelaide Hospital after taking a lethal dose of chlorodyne.

== Postscript ==
- While in the Northern Territory he made a collection of anthropological, botanical and other specimens, but was unable in the circumstances to ship them down south. It is probable that some of the collection sent by Ninnis to F. G. Waterhouse at the South Australian Institute and the selection of Territory timbers to the Museum of Economic Botany at the Adelaide Botanic Garden, which went on display a month after Ninnis took office, should properly have been attributed to Goldsmith.
- Goldsmith was one of the few members of the early surveying parties not to be recognised in any of the street names of Darwin and suburbs. Goldsmith Street, Fannie Bay was named for his son, Dr Frederick Goldsmith, Medical Officer and Protector of Aborigines, 1897–1901.

== Personal ==
Goldsmith married Emma Hallett (13 October 1840 – 5 October 1909), daughter of John Hallett, on 13 December 1865. They had two sons:

- Frederick Goldsmith (12 July 1867 – 4 March 1942), educated at St Peter's College, graduated MB and ChB at Adelaide University in 1889. In 1897 he was appointed medical officer at Palmerston, registrar of births, deaths, and marriages for the district of Palmerston, health officer at Port Darwin, and Protector of Aborigines at Palmerston. He underwent additional training in tropical medicine and in 1909 was appointed Federal Medical Officer in Papua. He married Edith Ellen Edmunds (1 January 1871 – 1944), daughter of Arthur Joseph Edmunds, on 2 April 1891, and later had a home on Kensington Road, Norwood.
- John Willan Goldsmith (20 February 1869 – 2 November 1871) died from "congestion of the brain" (perhaps cerebral oedema)

His widow, Emma Goldsmith, née Hallett, married again, to Alexander Brodie (c. 1831 – 24 November 1907) of Morphett Vale on 16 February 1883.
