= SS Gothenburg =

British steamship wrecked on the Great Barrier Reef

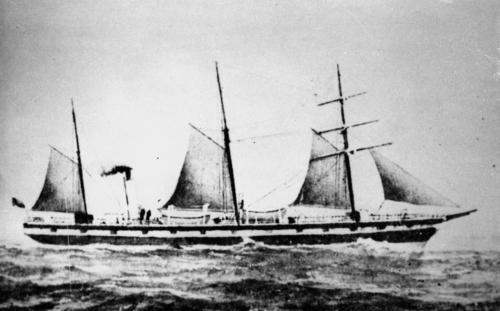
- Gothenburg

History
- Name: Gothenburg
- Namesake: Gothenburg
- Owner: 1854: North of Europe SN Co; by 1865: John H Blackwood; by 1874: McMeckan & Blackwood
- Operator: 1854: J Hervey
- Port of registry: 1854: London; 1862: Melbourne
- Route: 1854: London – Sweden; 1860s: Australia – New Zealand
- Builder: Charles Lungley & Co, Millwall
- Launched: 1 April 1854
- Refit: rebuilt at Adelaide, 1873
- Identification: by 1857: UK official number 23071; by 1866: code letters NQDB
- Fate: wrecked, 24 February 1875

General characteristics
- Tonnage: 1855: 572 GRT, 345 NRT; 1871: 675 GRT, 459 NRT; 1874: 737 GRT, 501 NRT
- Length: 1871: 187.4 ft (57.1 m); 1874: 196.6 ft (59.9 m)
- Beam: 1871: 28.1 ft (8.6 m); 1874: 28.2 ft (8.6 m)
- Depth: 1871: 12.9 ft (3.9 m); 1874: 20.5 ft (6.2 m)
- Installed power: 120 hp
- Propulsion: 2-cylinder steam engine
- Sail plan: 3-masted barquentine
- Crew: 34

SS Gothenburg was an iron-hulled sail- and steamship that was built in England in 1854 and sailed between England and Sweden until 1862. She then moved to Australia, where she operated across the Tasman Sea to and from New Zealand until 1873, when she was rebuilt. After her rebuild, she operated in the Australian coastal trade.

In February 1875 Gothenburg was wrecked in a storm on the Great Barrier Reef off the north coast of Queensland. Twenty-two people survived in three lifeboats. Between 98 and 112 people were killed, including a number of civil servants and dignitaries.

== Building ==
Charles Lungley & Co built Gothenburg at Millwall on the River Thames. Her launch on 1 April 1854 was marred by her colliding with the steamship Clyde. Clyde was sunk and Gothenburg sustained damage to her stern and her propeller.

As built, the ship had a registered length of 187.4 ft (57.1 m), her beam was 28.1 ft (8.6 m) and her draft was 12.9 ft (3.9 m). Her tonnages were 572 GRT and 345 NRT.

She had a two-cylinder steam engine that was rated at 120 horsepower. She had three masts and was rigged as a barquentine. Her single funnel was set well aft, between her main and mizzen masts. She carried four lifeboats, two on each side.

Gothenburg first owner was the North of Europe Steam Navigation Company, who registered her at London. Under the Merchant Shipping Act 1854, her official number was 23071.

== European and trans-Tasman services ==
The North of Europe SN Co operated Gothenburg between Irongate Wharf near the Tower of London and Sweden. In 1862 John H Blackwood bought her and she sailed to Australia, where Blackwood re-registered her in Melbourne. By 1866 her code letters were NQDB.

Gothenburg was one of the most modern vessels working in Australian waters in the 1860s, and became a popular ship as she was considered reliable. After several years (Port Chalmers first visit in June 1862) on the Trans-Tasman route between Australia and New Zealand, her owners transferred her to the Australian coastal service. By 1871 her tonnages had been reassessed to 675 GRT and 459 NRT.

== Rebuild and Australian coastal service ==
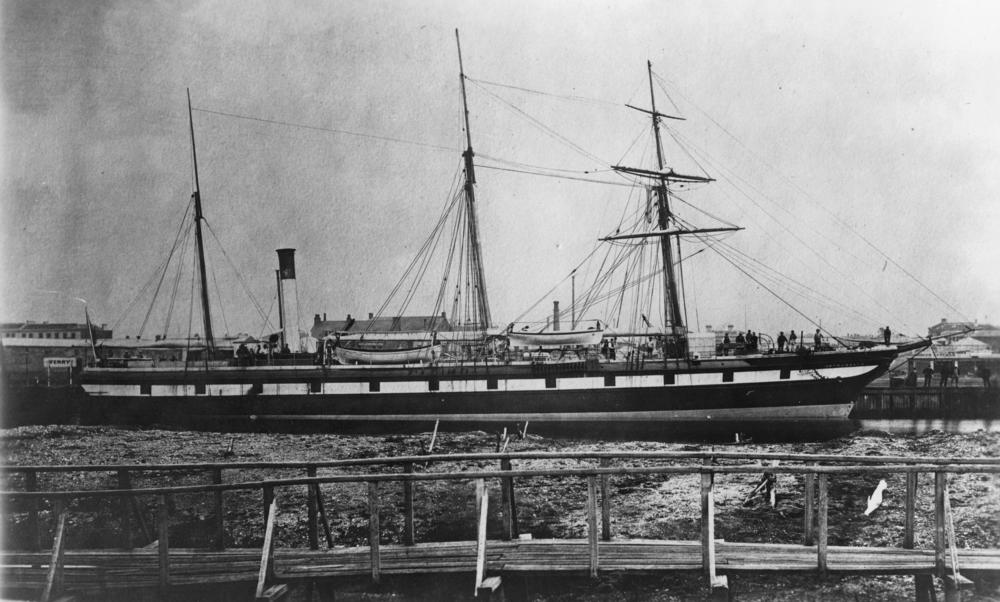
Gothenburg at Port Adelaide wharf after her lengthening in 1873

In 1873 Gothenburg was rebuilt at Adelaide to increase her range, cargo capacity and passenger accommodation.

As rebuilt, her registered length was 196.6 ft (59.9 m), her beam was 28.2 ft (8.6 m) and her draft was 20.5 ft (6.2 m). Her tonnages were increased to 737 GRT and 501 NRT. By 1874 her owners were registered as McMeckan and Blackwood.

In November 1874, several shipowners were contracted for two years by the Government of South Australia to provide ten round trips between the colonial capital of Adelaide and its furthest outpost, Port Darwin. Port Darwin was feeling the effects of a gold rush at Pine Creek and growing quickly as a trading post with the Dutch East Indies. However, all the local banks sent their money, together with government paperwork and the Royal Mail, around the east coast to Adelaide. On successful completion of each voyage, the South Australian government would pay the owners £1,000 sterling.

When Gothenburg left Port Darwin on Tuesday, 16 February 1875, Captain Robert George Augustus Pearce was under orders to make best possible speed. Pearce had been her captain on the Adelaide – Darwin run for some time and had built up a solid reputation. He was a man of the sea, a man of sobriety and kindness, and was well respected by his fellow sea captains.

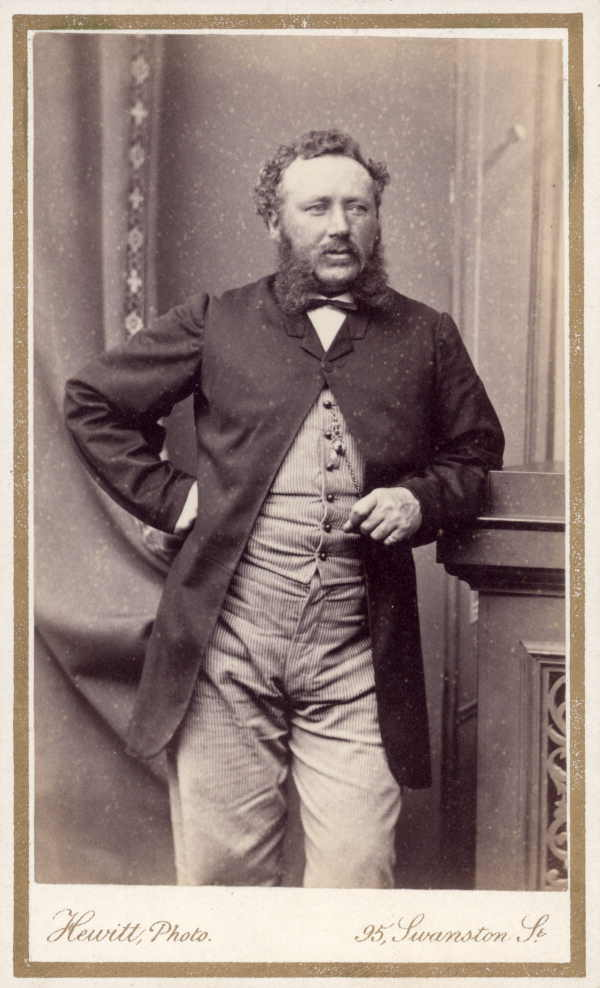
Captain R. G. A. Pearce

Amongst the approximately 98 passengers and 37 crew (surviving records vary) were government officials, circuit court judges, Darwin residents taking their first furlough, and miners. Also aboard was the French Vice Consul Edouard Durand and James Millner, the medical officer in George W. Goyder's 1869 expedition to found the first colony at Port Darwin. There were also several prisoners aboard, bound for the Adelaide jail. Locked in the Captain's cabin was about 93 kilograms (3,000 ozt) of gold valued at £40,000 consigned to the ES&A Bank in Adelaide, worth about AUD$18 million in 2026. Durand reportedly also carried a tin box with him containing gold sovereigns and coins worth in excess of £3,000.

In three days of fine weather, Gothenburg travelled 1,500 kilometres (900 mi) from Palmerston (Darwin) to Somerset on Cape York. The weather began to worsen so the ship stopped to take on ballast at Somerset. While she was anchored, conditions deteriorated to a point where both anchor chains parted. After the loss of the anchors, Gothenburg was forced to prematurely steam out 13 kilometres (7.0 nmi) because of strong currents; at that point, she brought up for the night.

Two days later, Tuesday 23 February, Gothenburg passed Cooktown at about 2:00 pm. The wind and rain severely increased and cloud cover became so thick it blocked out the sun. Despite this, she continued the journey south into worsening weather, in a deep water passage between the North Queensland coastline and the Great Barrier Reef, known as the inner route. Although taking this route provided some protection from the open sea, captains had to navigate and thread their way through a number of then-uncharted reefs. All passengers and crew expected to be in Newcastle on Sunday evening for a scheduled stopover.

== Shipwreck ==
Wreck of Gothenburg

On the evening of 24 February 1875, the ship was still heading south in almost cyclonic conditions with fore, top, and mainsails set and the steam engines running at full speed. Flooding rains lashed the entire Queensland coast and Captain Pearce reportedly could not see land or sun. At about 7:00 pm, and for reasons undetermined, he changed course and shortly afterwards, at full speed (11 to 12 knots), hit a section of the Great Barrier Reef at low tide 31 miles (50 km) northwest of Holbourne Island. Gothenburg struck with such force that she was left high up on the reef. Immediately, an order came out to lower the sails. At first, there was no panic and many passengers returned to their cabin bunks expecting Gothenburg would come off the reef at high tide.

In an attempt to refloat her, Captain Pearce ordered Gothenburg to be lightened forward. Water casks used as ballast and passengers were positioned aft in an endeavour to refloat her as the tide rose, but without success. Finally, a fatal attempt was made to refloat her, by reversing the engine hard. The vessel came half off the reef, but holed herself badly and then slewed broadside to the waves, in a much worse position. However, with the tide rising and some cargo now being dumped overboard, all aboard still expected Gothenburg to float free. With strong winds changing direction and seas increasing, the boiler fires were extinguished by water rising through the damaged stern. Around midnight, the chief engineer came on deck to report that the engine room was flooded and the engine was of no further use. With heavy seas now rushing down hatchways and into the cabins, Gothenburg was doomed and Captain Pearce was forced to admit that the situation had become desperate.

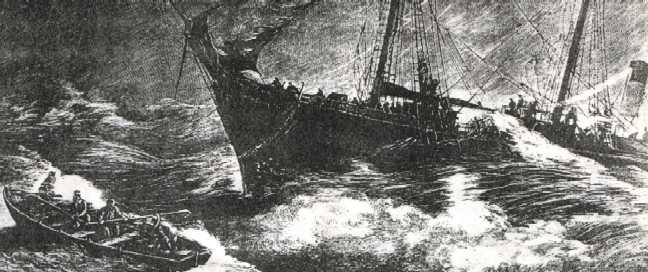
Steamer Gothenburg

The storm made launching the lifeboats almost impossible. At about 3:00 am, Captain Pearce ordered the two port lifeboats lowered, each with four crew on board. While being passed astern one of the boats broke the painter and became adrift. Her crew tried hard to pull up to the ship's side, but it was impossible in the heavy squall. The other was accidentally let go and both boats, in heavy seas, were unable to be retrieved.

At about 3:30 am on Thursday, 25 February, Gothenburg continued to heel over. The deck became so steep that passengers and crew had to climb over the rails to get on her side. At about 4:00 am, the two remaining starboard lifeboats were lowered and were rushed by the passengers. One starboard lifeboat, crammed with women and children, capsized when others tried to board it. Some half dozen men righted her in the water, but, damaged and without oars, food, or water, it quickly drifted away and was never found. The second starboard lifeboat also capsized when the sea crashed over, washing all the occupants into the sea. One passenger recalled the sea on the downwind side of the ship being covered with human heads bobbing up and down like corks. Five or six men and one woman climbed onto the upturned hull. The boat was still connected to its painter, but it was unable to be recovered from the heavy sea and wind which swept the woman off and drowned her. A passenger, John Cleland, swam to the connected, but upturned lifeboat and further secured it with a rope tied to Gothenburg. In less than fifteen minutes, nearly 100 people had drowned; washed away, or trapped in their water-filled cabins. By this time, several sharks were circling the wreck.

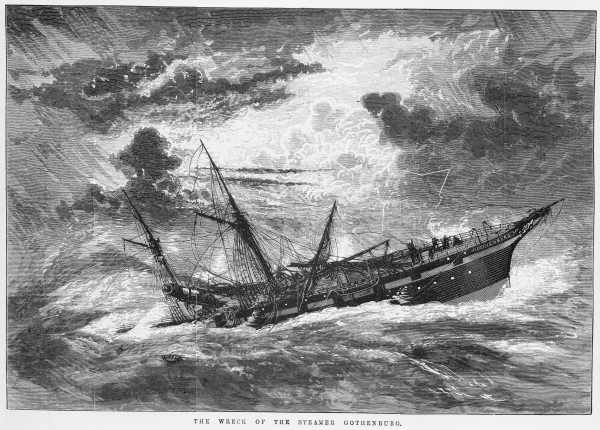
Artist's impression of Gothenburg's wreck

Those still on board Gothenburg tried to cling to the rigging, but throughout the early morning of 25 February, several more people were drowned after they were swept overboard by large broadside waves. Many passengers associated with the gold diggings were unwilling to let go of their gold and money belts, as it was probably their life savings; these individuals insisted on keeping them tied and once overboard reportedly drowned very quickly.

=== Survivors ===
By the morning of 25 February, only the masts were visibly protruding from the water, with 14 people clinging to the rigging, where they remained for the next twenty-four hours in cyclonic weather. At low tide, Gothenburg sank stern first and the wreck fell apart. However, the remaining starboard lifeboat, which had capsized, was still held by her painter and the rope attached by Cleland. At first light on 26 February the weather eased and the survivors managed to right the boat and bail it out; they prepared a makeshift sail and paddled for the mainland. About seven hours later they realised they could not make the mainland, so they altered course for an island that could be seen in the distance. When they arrived, they were met by four of the crew from one of the port lifeboats. Their lifeboat had been severely damaged on the rocks on the opposite side of the island in an attempt to land there the day before.

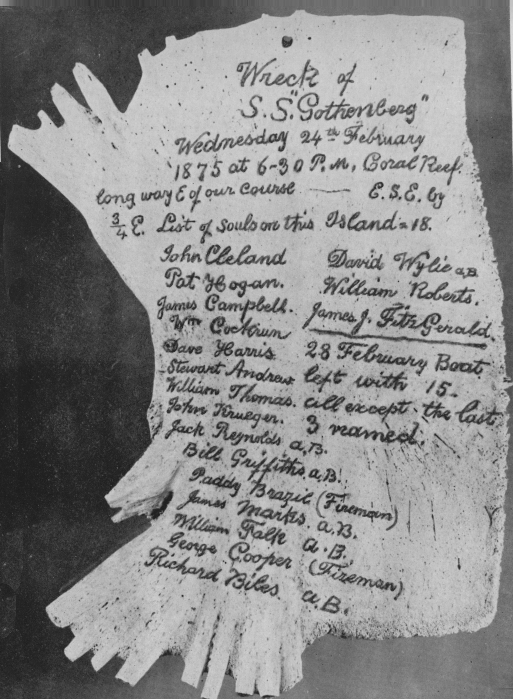
Gothenburgs's Turtle Shell Roll

The other port lifeboat, with four crew on board, was picked up by the steamer Leichhardt at an island at the entrance to Whitsunday Passage. The steamer immediately reversed course back towards the wreck, which she reached about 3.30 pm on Friday, 26 February. Gothenburg was a complete wreck; the funnel was gone and she had sunk to the eyes of the lower rigging. Leichhardt's Chief Officer and four hands went alongside, but nothing other than her masts could be seen above the water except for the body of a naked man floating nearby. They assumed the other victims had been taken by sharks. Leichhardt searched for survivors until last light and then made way for Bowen where the alarm was raised.

At Holbourne Island, the other 18 survivors were living off raw bird's eggs and rainwater that had pooled in the island rocks. Because rescue was uncertain, they engraved ship details and their names on the concave side of a large turtle shell, in the hope that it would be found in the future. On Sunday, 28 February, 15 of them set off in the starboard lifeboat for an island about 20 miles away to the south, which appeared to be closer to the main shipping lane. A rescue ship sent looking for survivors, picked up the group and took them safely to Bowen. Another rescue ship, Bunyip from Townsville, subsequently returned to Holbourne Island and rescued the three remaining survivors.

== Aftermath ==
Although reports vary, records show that between 98 and 112 people drowned. Most records state the death toll at 102. Only 22 people survived (12 crew and 10 passengers). All 25 women and children aboard and all the officers died.

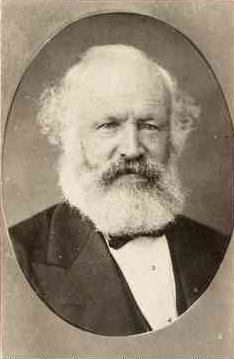
Thomas Reynolds

Edward W. Price, Magistrate and Commissioner Circuit Court of the Northern Territory, who remained behind in Darwin, lost his wife and six children. Devastated by the news, he was given six months leave on full pay by the government. The retired fifth Premier of South Australia, Thomas Reynolds and his wife, Anne, both drowned as did Eduard Durand, the French Vice Consul.

Other notable passengers who died were Dr James Millner and his family, Justice William A. Wearing QC, Circuit Court Judge; Joseph Whitby, acting South Australian Crown Solicitor; Richard Wells, NT Times & Gazette editor; Lionel Pelham, a senior public servant; Commander Andrew Ross of the Royal Navy; C. J. Lyons, Justice Wearing's senior assistant; William Shoobridge, Secretary to several mining companies; A. L. McKay, Government Surveyor; and several Overland Telegraph employees.

Never before in Australian history had so many high-profile public servants, dignitaries, and diplomats died in a single tragedy. Many passengers who died were Darwin residents and news of the tragedy severely affected the small community, reportedly taking several years to recover. Most of Gothenburg's crew were from Melbourne and as a result of the shipwreck, 11 widows and 34 children were left destitute in Victoria.

At Bowen, twelve survivors left with Captain Lake on the ship Victoria headed for Sydney. They all got free passage from McMerkan, Blackwood and Co, the owners of Gothenburg. The four survivors from the second port lifeboat that were picked up by the steamer Leichhardt, remained with that ship and subsequently made way for Brisbane.

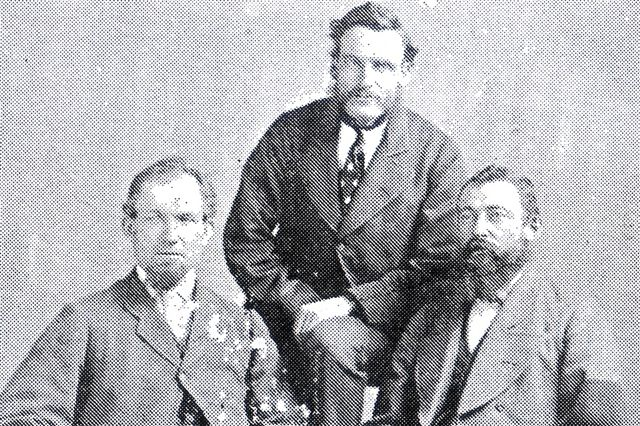
From left: Robert Brazil, John Cleland and James Fitzgerald in 1875

Two weeks later a hard-hat diver, sent down to recover the gold and other valuables, found the bodies of two women at the foot of the saloon staircase, one with her arm around the other. The diver tried to reach them to take a lock of hair or some other personal item that could be identified by their loved ones, but the restriction of the air line made it impossible. The gold in the Captain's cabin was recovered after much difficulty. While recovering the gold, several sharks that were caught near the wreck were found to contain human bones, remains and jewellery.

There were three heroes identified that tragic night, all attested to by all the other survivors, for their attempts to save other passengers. In recognition of their bravery, on 26 July 1875, the Governor of South Australia, Sir Anthony Musgrave, presented passengers James Fitzgerald and John Cleland and crewman Robert Brazil with gold medals and a gold watch. The Gothenburg Relief Fund Committee also presented each of them with a gold chain.

=== Report ===
The report of the Marine Board of Queensland determined that:

the loss of the Gothenburg may in a great measure be attributed to an unexpected offset seawards, caused by heavy floods in the Burdekin and other rivers discharging themselves into the sea at that portion of the coast; at the same time they do not consider that due caution was observed in the navigation of the vessel, as they are of the opinion that some attempt should have been made to sight Cape Bowling Green Lighthouse, or Cape Upstart, and, failing that, that the lead should have been used, which, on this part of the coast, is a sufficient guide for keeping clear of the Barrier; a vessel carrying a depth not exceeding 15 fathoms (27 m) or 16 fathoms (29 m) being well clear of that danger, while a less depth would show an approach to the shore of the mainland.

=== Lifeboats ===
There was also much speculation at the time in the Adelaide and Melbourne press on why the lifeboats had not been launched earlier. Survivor James Fitzgerald pointed out in his recollection that, had the lifeboats been filled to capacity, no one would have survived the severe weather conditions experienced. He also commented that passenger vessels were not required to carry enough lifeboats, concluding that there were insufficient places for all Gothenburg's passengers and crew. It was not until some 37 years later, after RMS Titanic had sunk in 1912, that it was made compulsory for all British registered ships to carry enough lifeboats for everyone aboard.

== Present day ==
Today, only parts of the deteriorated iron hull and the coal-fired square boilers of Gothenburg remain. The wreck lies in 9 to 16 metres (30 to 52 ft) of water on the western side of Old Reef, 130 kilometres (81 mi) southeast of Townsville. The Gothenburg shipwreck is registered on the Queensland National Estate (place ID #8923) as a Heritage site, and is protected under Section 7 of the (Commonwealth) Historic Shipwrecks Act 1976, which requires that divers have a permit to enter the 200m protected zone that has been declared around the wreck. Its official location is: Old Reef, Great Barrier Reef, 75 kilometres (47 mi) north-east of Ayr, at 19°22′06″S 148°03′21″E. The reef around the wreck provides good diving with an extensive coral garden. A strict non-disturbance policy applies to marine flora and fauna as well as to the fabric of the wreck. Pelagic fish and reef sharks are common.

=== Legacy ===
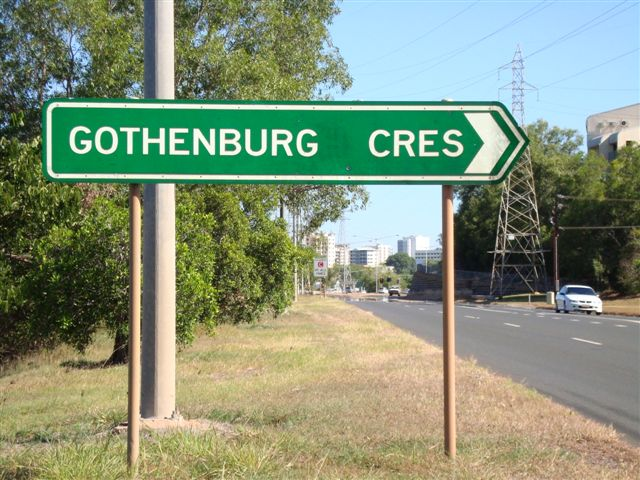
Gothenburg Crescent with Darwin in the background

The northern Darwin suburb of Millner was named after Dr James Millner who, together with his family, lost their lives on Gothenburg. Most streets in the northern Darwin suburb of Coconut Grove and some in the adjacent suburb of Millner, were named after local Darwin residents, interstate visitors, and crew who lost their lives in the shipwreck. Gothenburg Crescent, in the inner Darwin suburb of Stuart Park, was named after the ship.

The large turtle shell, which was engraved by the 18 survivors at Holbourne Island, is displayed at the South Australian Museum, on North Terrace, Adelaide.

=== Other references ===
By August 1866 there was a pub named The Gothenburg in Flinders Street, Melbourne. It had an image of the ship above the entrance. The pub, which had a raffish reputation, was renamed the Crown and Anchor around 1870, five years before the tragedy.

== Survivors ==
In 1875, a detailed list of all passengers and crew was published by JH Lewis, Printer & Publisher, albeit with several errors and spelling mistakes. That document was used as the main source of the following survivors' table.

The survivors' surnames have been reconciled against rescue ships' log books, other records and a photo of the engraved turtle shell. Known discrepancies have been clarified, where possible, in the comments section.

=== Survivors ===
Name	Status	Comment
Andrew, Stewart	Passenger	Gold miner; some records have spelt as "Andrews"
Bilts, Richard	Crew	Able Seaman; some records have incorrectly spelt as "Betts" or "Blyes"
Brazil, Robert ("Paddy")	Crew	Fireman; awarded a Medal for bravery; Brazil Crescent in Karama named after
Burns, William	Crew	Trimmer; rescued by the steamer Leichhardt
Campbell, James, J.	Passenger	Died shortly after rescue from ill effects of exposure
Cleland, John	Passenger	Gold miner; Cleland Street in Millner named after; awarded a Medal for bravery
Cockrum, Thomas Gabriel	Passenger	Gold miner; elsewhere spelled "Cockram", "Cockburn" or "Cockerman" but "Cockrum" in obits and BDM(SA) 299/62 of 1903.
Cooper, George	Crew	Fireman; some records have incorrectly spelt as George "Cover"
Falk, John William	Crew	Able Seaman, elsewhere listed as "William F." Falk but "John William" in article, obits and BDM(SA) 571/2508 of 1935.
Fitzgerald, James J.	Passenger	Fitzgerald Street in Millner named after; awarded a medal for bravery
Griffiths, William ("Bill")	Crew	Able Seaman
Harris, David	Passenger	Virginia Gold Mining Company; Harris Street in Millner named after
Halminson, Salin or Salve	Crew	Able Seaman; rescued by steamer Leichhardt; several incorrect variations of his surname exist
Hogan, Patrick J.	Passenger	Gold miner
Hudson, Joseph	Crew	Fireman; rescued by the steamer Leichhardt
Kruger, Jack	Passenger	Gold miner
Marks, James	Crew	Able Seaman
Nelson, Harry	Crew	Forecabin Steward; rescued by the steamer Leichhardt
Reynolds, Jack	Crew	Able Seaman
Roberts, William	Passenger	Gold miner; some records have incorrectly spelt as William "Romers"
Thomas, William S.	Passenger	Purser of Winns Gold Mining Company, NT; only Saloon passenger to survive
Wylie, David	Crew	Able Seaman; Helmsman at time of grounding

=== Full known passenger list ===
Name	Comment	Status
Andrew, Stewart	Gold miner; some records have spelt as "Andrews"	Survived
Blades	Male	Died
Cameron, George Francis	Probably a gold miner	Died
Campbell, James, J.	Survived, but died shortly after rescue from the ill effects of exposure	Survived
Cartwright family	Edward & 2 sons; Cartwright Court in Coconut Grove named after	All died
Cleave, Edward	Male; gold miner and prisoner	Died
Cleland, John	Gold miner; Cleland Street in Millner named after; awarded a Medal for bravery	Survived
Cockram, Thomas	Gold miner; some records have incorrectly spelt as "Cockburn" or "Cockerman"	Survived
Copeland, T.	Male	Died
Cox family	Darwin residents; Mr Thomas Price Wynne Cox, wife Mary with 3 daughters and 1 son	All died
Craig, Joseph	Darwin resident; Craig Crescent in Coconut Grove named after	Died
Deane, James	Gold miner; surname has also been spelt "Dean"	Died
Dittmar, A.W.	Gold miner; surname has also been spelt "Dittmer"	Died
Durand, Edouard	French Vice Consul; Durand Court in Coconut Grove named after	Died
Easther, William	Overland Telegraph employee; Easther Crescent in Coconut Grove named after	Died
Eastwright family	Father and son	Both died
Edgar, J.	Male; mining engineer	Died
Fairhall, Henry William	Cattle drover and gold miner	Died
Fitzgerald, James, J.	Fitzgerald Street in Millner named after; awarded a Medal for bravery	Survived
Floyd, William	Overland Telegraph employee; Floyd Court in Coconut Grove named after	Died
Fogerty, James, F.	Gold miner	Died
Fry, Charles	Saddle maker; Darwin resident; Fry Street in Palmerston named after	Died
Glenister, H.	Male; gold miner	Died
Goulder family	Joseph Peake Goulder (age 45) and son William Thomas Goulder (age 19)	Both died
Graham, William H.	Employed by Adcock, Caldwell & Co, merchants	Died
Griffiths, James	Gold miner	Died
Harris, David	Virginia Gold Mining Company; Harris Street in Millner named after	Survived
Hart family	Patrick and wife; Darwin residents; Hart Court in Coconut Grove named after	Both died
Hazell, Henry	Darwin resident; Overland Telegraph employee; Hazell Court in Coconut Grove named after	Died
Hearce, H.	Male	Died
Hogan, Patrick, J.	Gold miner	Survived
Hunt family	James Alexander and wife Eliza; publican of Great Britain Hotel	Both died
Johns, Edwin, S.	Stonemason	Died
Kruger, Jack	Gold miner	Survived
Lauche, W.	Male; gold miner; has also been spelt "Lauchs"	Died
Lebane, Charlie	Gold miner	Died
Lizzar, Simon	Gold miner and Overland Telegraph employee	Died
Lyons, C. J.	Male; public Servant to Judge Wearing	Died
Martin, Richard	Overland Telegraph employee; Martin Crescent in Coconut Grove named after. Left widow and three children at Strathalbyn	Died
MaCarthy, John	Overland Telegraph employee	Died
McCallum, Malcolm	Gold miner	Died
McCreagh, R. (Jim)	Warden's teamster	Died
McHarg, W.	Male; surveyor; Overland Telegraph employee	Died
McKay, A. L.	Male; government surveyor	Died
McKnight, R.	Male; gold miner	Died
Millner family	Dr James, wife Caroline and 4 children; Darwin suburb of Millner named after	All died
Mitchell, John	Gold miner and Overland Telegraph employee	Died
Musgrave, Charles, W.	With Goyder's 1868 expedition and Overland Telegraph, Darwin resident; Musgrave Crescent in Coconut Grove named after	Died
Nation family	William, wife (Mary) & infant son (William); Nation Crescent in Coconut Grove named after	All died
Newcombe, J.	Male; gold miner and Overland Telegraph employee	Died
Ostermann family	Mrs (widow) & son; Ostermann Street in Coconut Grove named after	Both died
Peters, Otto	Darwin storekeeper; Previously partner in Adelaide store Peters & Martin, which became John Martin's Peters Street in Coconut Grove named after him	Died
Pelham, Lionel James	Senior Public Servant and Sketcher	Died
Price (née Hamilton) family	Minna & her 6 children; Price Street in Parap named after the family	All Died
Radford, Thomas	Male; gold miner; Radford Court in Coconut Grove named after	Died
Reynolds, Thomas	Retired Premier of South Australia; Reynolds Court in Coconut Grove named after	Died
Reynolds (née Litchfield), Anne	Wife of Thomas Reynolds; aunt of N.T. explorer Fred Litchfield	Died
Roberts, William	Gold miner; some records have incorrectly spelt as William "Romers"	Survived
Roe, Dan		Died
Ross, Andrew	Commander, Royal Navy; manager of the Australian Fishing Company	Died
Runge, John	Male; Darwin hotelkeeper; Runge Street in Coconut Grove named after	Died
Shoobridge, William	Mining company secretary; Shoobridge Street in Millner named after	Died
Simms, T.	Male	Died
Slocomb, James	Carpenter	Died
Stone, A.	Male; gold miner	Died
Thomas, William, S.	Purser of Winns Gold Mining Company, NT; only Saloon passenger to survive	Survived
Thompson, W.	Male	Died
Vigor, N. S.	Female (Widow) Darwin resident; Vigor Street in Coconut Grove named after	Died
Wearing, William Alfred	Justice and Circuit Court Judge	Died
Wells, Richard	Darwin resident; NT Times & Gazette Editor; Wells Street in Ludmilla named after	Died
Whitby, Joseph James	Acting South Australian Crown Solicitor	Died
Williams, J. A. D.	Male; Overland Telegraph employee	Died
Wilson, W. D.	Male; teamster in Goyder's party	Died

=== Full known crew list ===
Name	Comment	Status
Anderson, John	Third Engineer	Died
Bilts, Richard	Able Seaman; some records have incorrectly spelt as "Betts" or "Blyes"	Survived
Bond, P.S.	Steward	Died
Brazil, Robert (Paddy)	Fireman; awarded a Medal for bravery; Brazil Crescent in Karama named after	Survived
Brown, Charles, T.	Steward	Died
Burns, William	Trimmer	Survived
Butler or Butter, Thomas	Able Seaman	Died
Cheese, George, S.	Steward	Died
Clark, William	Fireman; body found with identification by a rescue vessel	Died
Cooper, George	Fireman; some records have incorrectly spelt as George "Cover"	Survived
Davies or Davis, R. F.	Chief Officer	Died
Delaney, John	Fireman	Died
Flegg, John Valentine	Fireman	Died
Falk, William, F.	Able Seaman	Survived
Green, Charles	Second Engineer	Died
Griffiths, William (Bill)	Able Seaman	Survived
Hodness or Hodnett, James	First Cook	Died
Halminson, Salin or Salve	Able Seaman; died about 2 weeks after rescue from the ill effects of exposure	Survived
Hudson, Joseph	Fireman	Survived
Hunter, Adam	Fireman	Died
Jackson or Jeakson, Charles	Able Seaman	Died
Marks, James	Able Seaman	Survived
McDermott or Dermott, Charles	Cook's mate	Died
Nelson, Harry	Forecabin Steward	Survived
Nock, W. C.	Steward	Died
Pearce, R.G.A. (James)	Captain or Master of the Gothenburg; Pearce Place in Millner named after	Died
Peverren, A.	Able Seaman	Died
Randall, William	Second Cook	Died
Reynolds, Jack	Able Seaman	Survived
Robertson, M.A.	Stewardess; only female crew member	Died
Rosena, Gustave	Fireman	Died
Ross or Rose, David	Carpenter	Died
Short, David	Chief Engineer	Died
Smith, James	Steward	Died
Stephens or Stevens, R.	Second Officer	Died
Tyrrell, James	Fireman	Died
Wylie, David	Able Seaman; Helmsman at time of grounding	Survived

== See also ==
- List of disasters in Australia by death toll
- List of shipwrecks of Australia
- Timeline of Australian history
- Historic Shipwrecks Act 1976#Historic shipwreck protected zones – Australian legislation
