= William Pearson (surveyor) =

William Pearson (c. 1829 – 7 September 1905) was a surveyor in the early days of the colony of South Australia.

== History ==
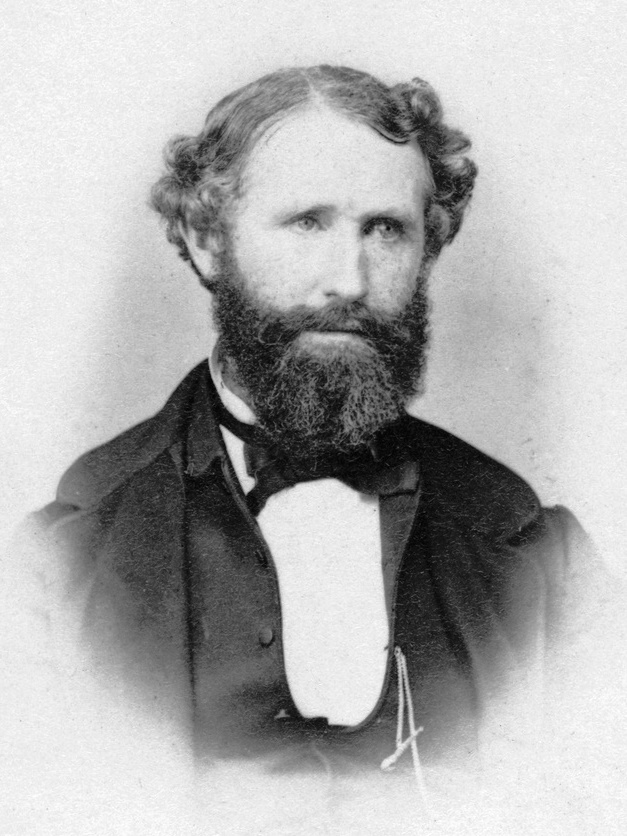
William Pearson c. 1865

Pearson arrived in South Australia in 1849, perhaps in September of that year aboard the ship Caroline.

In the 1850s he had a private surveying practice, working out of Angaston.

In December 1857 he was appointed, with W. H. Christie, R. Edmunds and W. Dawson, as surveyor to the Survey and Crown Lands Department.

In 1864 he surveyed the town of Port Mannum, where blocks went on sale in October 1864. (A private town of the same name was laid out on portion of section 114, by W. B. Randell in 1869.)

In March 1864 he was appointed to the Northern Territory as one of several surveyors in a contingent of 40 under B. T. Finniss who left for Adam Bay, Northern Territory on the barque Henry Ellis with the task of choosing and surveying a site for a principal town to be called Palmerston. The site chosen, Escape Cliffs, had an excellent harbour with the deepest river (the Adelaide) in the Territory. Most of the land however was low-lying salt plains populated with mangroves, boggy and mosquito-infested at high tide and a quagmire in the Wet Season.

On 9 August 1864 Pearson was leader of a party of four (himself, Litchfield, Dyer and Murray) on horseback, sent by Manton to recover stores which had been left unguarded on the river bank and consequently plundered by Aborigines. When approaching their camp, Aborigines armed with spears surrounded the party, injured a horse and several men, Pearson more seriously, one spear piercing his side, another his elbow and a third grazing his head above the ear. Litchfield and Dyer showed courage in removing Pearson from danger. Other settlers arrived on foot, ostensibly as a rescue party, several shots were fired at the natives, Alaric Ward killing one of their number.

Once Pearson had largely recovered from his wounds, he and Arthur Hamilton were sent to survey "The Narrows", the site on the Adelaide River selected by Finniss for a port, where one man was taken by a crocodile and another swept away in the swift current. Pearson developed purpura but was accused by Finniss of malingering ("Pooh!, a few mosquito bites"), and not until February 1865 permitted to return to base camp for treatment, sending Hamilton a labourer named Smith as his replacement. In April 1865 Pearson and King, both on sick leave, and 15 others left Adam Bay on supply ship Bengal for Surabaya, where he and most of the others transshipped to Melbourne by the steamer Douglas. Pearson was one of many critics of the site chosen for the new town, and of Finniss for refusing to look for alternatives, though this was only one of many criticisms levelled at their leader. Pearson may have been one of the Officers aggrieved that Finniss preferred the company of bright young labourers, such as Auld and Bennett to men of his own social class. (Although classified as labourers, both Auld and Bennett had been educated at Adelaide Educational Institution, as had G. T. Cottrell.)

From August 1869 to August 1870 he was a senior member under J. Evans, and for much of the time the leader, of a survey party involved in accurately defining the border between South Australia and New South Wales, to the satisfaction of both parties, unlike the boundary with Victoria, the subject of a long and costly (to South Australia) dispute. The work was arduous and demanding, but two incidents are worth recounting: the campsite chosen for one stage, later world-famous as Broken Hill, site of the great silver mines, and the hospitality shown the party by Alfred T. Dickens, son of the novelist, at Corona Station.

Pearson retired from the Lands Titles Office on June 30, 1902, and died three years later, survived by his second wife.

== Family ==
Pearson married Elizabeth Tait (c. 1829 – 16 December 1899) in 1851. Elizabeth arrived in South Australia in November 1850 aboard Joseph Somes. Elizabeth died at their home on Wakefield Street. They had one son:

- Thomas William Pearson (c. 1854 – 22 September 1892), Posts & Telegraph employee, died at Wakefield Street.

He married again, to Mary Harriet Parrott (1853– ) in 1902. She married again, to Robert Harry Allen, on 7 August 1906

John Thomas Pearson (c. 1841 – 10 July 1921) who married Maria Biggs, lived in Young Street, later in Robsart Street, Parkside, was a brother, also employed by Posts & Telegraph Department.
