= John Hallett (South Australian politician) =

Australian politician

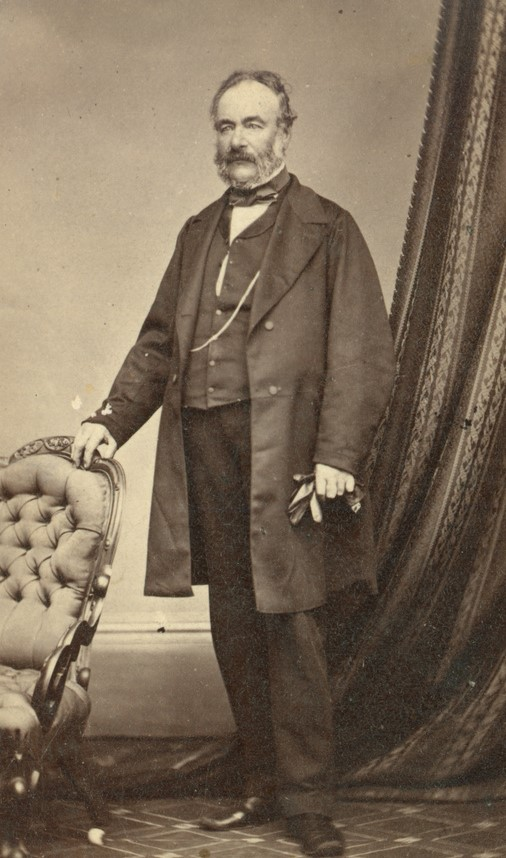

John Hallett (30 August 1804 – 10 June 1868) was a businessman, pastoralist and politician in the early days of the Colony of South Australia who was implicated in the massacre of Aborigines at Mount Bryan, South Australia in the 1840s.

== History ==
John Hallett was born in Woodford, Essex. He and his family emigrated to South Australia on the Africaine, under Captain John Finlay Duff, arriving at Nepean Bay, Kangaroo Island on 6 November 1836. Hallett, who was a business associate of Duff and both part-owners of the ship, was one of those who remained on the island, at least in part to assist in a search party for group who on 1 November went ashore to hike along the north of the island, a trek that took much longer than anticipated.

Hallett and his family lived for a time on Kangaroo Island before moving to Glenelg. He and his wife were present at the Proclamation on 28 December 1836, and purchased a town acre at the first land sale on 27 March 1837. He set up a business with Duff as merchants, and on 28 March 1838, was one of a panel (with Rev. C. B. Howard, Rev. T. Q. Stow, J. B. Hack, E. Stephens and J. Morphett) appointed to develop an official policy on the treatment of Aborigines. He built a substantial two-storey brick house on South Terrace, later occupied by Captain Charles Berkeley (–1856), Inspector of Police, and since demolished.

Hallett had a property, Willogoleechee, in the Mid North of South Australia that became the town of Hallett, named in Hallett's honour. In 1844, sheep were stolen from the property by local Ngadjuri Aboriginal people. Hallett's men tracked the Aboriginal people down and opened fire on them, killing as many as 30. The Protector of Aborigines investigated but only recommended that one of the Aboriginal men, 'Kangaroo Jack', be tried for stealing sheep. He was acquitted due to a lack of evidence. This incident is sometimes known as the "Mount Bryan massacre".

== Politics and after ==
He was a member for The Sturt in the South Australian House of Assembly from March 1857 to October 1862, having been narrowly reelected in 1860. His colleague in the first parliament was Thomas Reynolds and Joseph Peacock in the second. On 21 October 1862 parliament was prorogued, and the next day dissolved by proclamation. Hallett was a candidate at the ensuing election, but was beaten by R. B. Andrews. In August 1863 he was one of five candidates for three vacancies in the Legislative Council, but was unsuccessful. He withdrew from public affairs, and until his death lived in relative obscurity. Around 1860 he took up his residence at Ilfracombe, near Beaumont. In July 1863 his health deteriorated, and he transferred his business to his brother Alfred, and subsequently ventured to the city only once, in September, 1865. In 1868 he had three attacks of "serous apoplexy" (perhaps strokes), followed by bronchitis and died an hour or two before midnight, 10 June, surrounded by his family. At his request, the funeral and burial were private affairs, no public notice being issued.

== Recognition ==
- Hallett Cove (previously Hallett's Cove) was named for him.
- The town of Hallett, South Australia was named for him, and laid out on his property "Willogoleechee".

== Family ==
John Hallett (30 August 1804 – 10 June 1868) married Maria King (c. 1808 – 31 January 1891); they had five sons (three born in England) and five daughters:

- John Charles Hallett (c. 1832 – 31 October 1882) lived on Wakefield Street, Adelaide
- Richard Hallett (c. 1833 – 20 April 1882) lived at Wandillah Station, died of consumption.
- Henry Hallett (c. 1835 – 25 October 1911) married Martha Pike (10 June 1845 – 25 October 1926) on 24 July 1875. Henry was profoundly deaf.
- (Sara) Maria Hallett (7 January 1839 – 9 September 1907) married John Ogle Carlile (c. 1833 – 6 December 1912) of Mickolo, Western Plains on 5 January 1863
- Emma Edmunds (Edmonds?) Hallett (13 October 1840 – 5 October 1909) married Dr. Francis Edward Goldsmith (17 October 1825 – 24 July 1875) on 13 December 1865, lived Magill, then Robe. He was appointed Surgeon and Protector of Aborigines in Northern Territory and resigned shortly after, having lost the confidence of the Government Resident, B. T. Finniss. A chronically paralysed invalid, he died after taking poison. She married again, to Alexander Brodie ( – 25 November 1907) of Morphett Vale on 16 February 1883.
- Clara Selina Hallett (30 October 1842 – 17 June 1914) married (Thomas) Neville Wood (c. 1843 – 31 March 1907) of the South Australian Bank, Robe, on 15 January 1868
- Julia Elizabeth Hallett (2 February 1845 – 1929)
- Jessie Brodie Hallett (17 March 1847 – 1916) married William Little ( – ) on 15 January 1877, lived at Terowie
- Edward Regia Hallett (6 April 1837 – 10 July 1909) married Victoria King (8 October 1839 – 5 May 1917 ) on 8 December 1863, lived at Winninnie then Kensington. Victoria was the second daughter of Stephen King JP and sister of the explorer, Stephen King jr.
- Alfred King Hallett (13 April 1849 – 19 July 1864)
- Albert Selby Hallett (23 February 1852 – )

Alfred Hallett (c.1814 – 3 November 1877) of Medindie, South Australia and Jesse Hallett (c. 1812 – 19 February 1859) and Selby Hallett (c. 1808 – 8 November 1862), both of London, were his brothers

== See also ==
- Hundred of Hallett
