= List of Australian places named by James Cook =

List of geographic locations named by explorer James Cook

This is a list of Australian places named by James Cook. James Cook was the first navigator to chart most of the Australian east coast, one of the last major coastlines in the world unknown to Europeans at the time. Cook named many bays, capes and other geographic features, nearly all of which are still gazetted, and most of which are still in use today, although in some places the spelling is slightly different. This is a list of the placenames he used in his first voyage listed from south to north as described on his 1773 chart and in his journals.

== List ==
Name	Date (1770)	Reason for naming	Coords	Notes
Point Hicks	19 April	Lieutenant Zachary Hickes, "was the first who discover'd this land" However, there is no land feature at Cook's coordinates. In 1970, Cape Everard was renamed Point Hicks.	37°48′S 149°16′E	spelled his name Hickes, Cook wrote it without the "e"
Ram Head	19 April	Ramhead "go in to Plymouth Sound"	37°46′S 149°29′E	
Cape Howe	20 April	Richard Howe, 1st Earl Howe	37°30′S 149°58′E	
Cape Dromedary (Montague Island)	21 April	A point running out from under Mount Dromedary.	36°17′S 150°08′E	Cook mistook Montague Island for a headland.
Mount Dromedary	21 April	"pretty high mountain laying near the shore which on account of its figure I named Mount Dromedary"	36°17′51″S 150°01′00″E	now called Mount Gulaga
Batemans Bay	21 April		35°42′S 150°11′E	
Point Upright	22 April	"on account of its perpendicular Clifts"	35°37′S 150°19′E	
Pigeon House	22 April	"a remarkable peaked hill laying inland the top of which look'd like a Pigeon house"	35°17′S 150°17′E	Marked on chart as Pidgeon House
Cape St George	23 April	discovered on St George's Day	35°10′S 150°45′E	now Jervis Bay Territory
Long Nose	25 April	"on account of its Figure"	34°48′S 150°40′E	now called Beecroft Peninsula (to the north of Jervis Bay)
Red Point	25 April	red colour	34°29′S 150°55′E	
Point Solander	28 April	Daniel Solander, botanist on board	34°00′S 151°14′E	to the south of Botany Bay
Botany Bay	28 April – 6 May	"The great quantity of plants Mr. Banks and Dr. Solander found in this place occasioned my giving it the Name of Botany Bay"	33°58′S 151°10′E	originally Stingray Harbour
Cape Banks	6 May	Joseph Banks	33°59′S 151°15′E	to the north of Botany Bay
Port Jackson	6 May	George Jackson, a secretary of the Admiralty	33°50′S 151°16′E	
Broken Bay	7 May	"broken land that appear'd to form a bay"	33°34′07″S 151°19′00″E	Cook's Broken Bay was the area near Narrabeen Lake.
Cape Three Points	7 May	"high land which projected out in 3 bluff Points"	33°29′S 151°26′E	between Copacabana and Avoca Beach
Point Stephens	11 May	Sir Philip Stephens, Secretary to the Admiralty (1763–95)	32°44′S 152°12′E	On the coast near Fingal Bay, New South Wales
Port Stephens	11 May	Sir Philip Stephens, Secretary to the Admiralty	32°41′46″S 152°08′30″E	
Black Head	11 May		32°04′S 152°32′E	SE of Tinonee
Cape Hawke	11 May	Sir Edward Hawke, 1st Baron Hawke, First Lord of the Admiralty	32°12′S 152°34′E	
Three Brothers	12 May	"3 remarkable large high hills lying Contigious to each other... bore some resemblance to each other"	31°39′52″S 152°46′26″E	called separately South Brother (31°44′37″S 152°40′15″E ), Middle Brother and North Brother
Smoakey Cape	13 May	"fires that Caused a great Quantity of smoke" on the cape	30°54′S 153°06′E	
Solitary Isles	15 May		29°55′S 153°23′E	
Cape Byron	15 May	John Byron	28°37′58″S 153°38′20″E	Easternmost point of Australia
Mount Warning	16 May	breakers found within sight	28°23′50″S 153°16′15″E	
Point Danger	16 May	Point off which shoals lie	28°10′S 153°33′E	Cook's Point Danger was Fingal Head – 2n Miles South of the present-day Point Danger on the Qld–NSW border
Point Lookout	17 May		27°26′S 153°33′E	North-eastern point of North Stradbroke Island
Morton Bay	17 May	James Douglas, 14th Earl of Morton, was President of the Royal Society	27°15′S 153°15′E	Moreton was a later misspelling of Morton. What Cook named Morton Bay comprised the Pacific Ocean side of what is now called Moreton Island. The name Moreton Bay is now applied to larger expanse of water on the inland side of Moreton and Stradbroke Islands, comprising the mouth of the Brisbane River.
Cape Morton	17 May	James Douglas, 14th Earl of Morton	27°01′S 153°28′E	Northern end of Moreton Island, now spelled as Cape Moreton.
Glasshouse Bay	17 May		27°04′S 153°17′E	Cook did not realise it was part of Moreton Bay; between Moreton Island and Bribie Island
The Glass Houses	17 May	"on account of their singular form of elevation which very much resembles glass houses which occasioned my giving them that name"	26°55′S 152°56′E	Now called Glass House Mountains.
Double Island Point	18 May	"on account of its figure... the point itself is of such an unequal Height that it looks like 2 Small Islands laying under the land"	25°55′57″S 153°11′12″E	
Wide Bay	18 May	large open bay	25°54′S 153°08′E	
Indian Head	19 May	"on which a number of the Natives were Assembled"	25°00′S 153°22′E	Eastern point of Fraser Island.
Sandy Cape	20 May	sand	24°41′52″S 153°15′21″E	Northern point of Fraser Island
Break Sea Spit	21 May	"now we had smooth water, whereas upon the whole Coast to the Southward of it we had always a high Sea or swell from the South-East."	24°25′S 153°13′E	shoal projecting north from the north tip of Fraser Island
Herveys Bay	21 May	Augustus Hervey, 3rd Earl of Bristol	25°17′7″S 152°52′22″E	Now known as Hervey Bay.
South Head	23 May	South head of Bustard Bay	24°08′54″S 151°53′09″E	Now known as Round Hill Head, Cook's first landing in Queensland and second in Australia.
Bustard Bay	23 May	"We saw some Bustards such as we have in England, one of which we kill’d … which occasioned my giving this place the name of Bustard Bay."	24°06′S 151°49′E	Joseph Banks commented "At Dinner we eat the Bustard we had shot yesterday, it turnd out an excellent bird, far the best we all agreed that we have eat since we left England."
North Head	23 May	North head of Bustard Bay	24°01′S 151°46′E	Now known as Bustard Head.
Cape Capricorn	25 May	Tropic of Capricorn	23°28′S 151°13′E	NE point of Curtis Island.
Keppel Isles	26 May	Augustus Keppel, 1st Viscount Keppel	23°10′30″S 150°57′40″E	Now known as the Keppel Islands. Great Keppel Island largest of the group.
Keppel Bay	27 May	Augustus Keppel, 1st Viscount Keppel	23°23′S 150°53′E	
Cape Manyfold	27 May	"from the Number of high Hills over it"	22°41′S 150°50′E	Now known as Cape Manifold.
The Two Brothers	28 May		22°42′S 150°59′E	Now known as the Two Brothers island group. Matthew Flinders later named the individual islands Peaked Island and Flat Island.
Island Head	28 May		22°20′S 150°39′E	A cape on an unnamed island off the coast of Shoalwater.
Cape Townshend	28 May	Charles Townshend, Lord of the Admiralty 1765–1770	22°12′S 150°29′E	The northern tip of Townshend Island in Shoalwater.
Shoal Water Bay	28 May	Shoal water	22°22′S 150°22′E	Now written as Shoalwater Bay.
Northumberland Isles	28 May		21°40′S 150°10′E	Now known as Northumberland Islands.
Thirsty Sound	30 May	"by reason we could find no fresh Water"	22°10′S 149°58′E	
Bay of Inlets	1 June	"the Number of Inlets, Creeks, etc., in it."	22°19′S 149°50′E	Named a 100 km region of coastline from Cape Palmerston (south of Mackay) to Cape Townshend (name no longer in use)
Long Isle	1 June		22°07′S 149°54′E	Now known as Long Island (part of the locality of Stanage).
Broad Sound	1 June		22°10′S 149°45′E	A bay off the coast of St Lawrence and Carmila.
Cape Palmerston	1 June	Henry Temple, 3rd Viscount Palmerston, Lord of the Admiralty, 1766–78	21°01′S 149°29′E	On the coast at Koumala.
Slade Point	2 June	Sir Thomas Slade, Surveyor of the Navy and the designer of Nelson's HMS Victory.	21°03′48″S 149°13′30″E	A headland on the coast of the locality also called Slade Point.
Cape Hillsborough	2 June	Wills Hill, 1st Marquess of Downshire (the Earl of Hillsborough); First Secretary of State for the Colonies, and President of the Board of Trade	20°54′22″S 149°02′48″E	On the coast of the locality of Cape Hillsborough, approx 30 kilometres (19 mi) NNW of Mackay.
Repulse Bay	3 June		20°33′S 148°45′E	
Cape Conway	3 June	General Henry Seymour Conway, Secretary of State 1765–68	20°31′S 148°54′E	
Whitsundays Passage	4 June	discovered on Whitsunday	20°17′40″S 148°52′44″E	Now known as Whitsunday Passage, between Hamilton Island, Whitsunday Island and the mainland.
Cumberland Isles	4 June	Prince Henry, Duke of Cumberland and Strathearn,	20°34′S 149°08′E	Now known as the Cumberland Islands.
Cape Gloucester	4 June	Prince William Henry, Duke of Gloucester and Edinburgh	20°00′55″S 148°27′18″E	The cape Cook named was the island now known as Gloucester Island. Subsequently the Admirality's hydrographer transferred the name to the cape on the mainland immediately south of the island, which is still known as Cape Gloucester.
Holburn Isle	4 June	Admiral Francis Holburne	19°43′S 148°21′E	Now known as Holbourne Island, which is protected within the Holbourne Island National Park.
Edgecumbe Bay	4 June	Captain George Edgcumbe, 1st Earl of Mount Edgcumbe commanded the Lancaster in the fleet in North America in 1758 in which Cook served.	20°06′S 148°23′E	
Mount Upstart	5 June	"because being surrounded with low land it starts or rises up singley at the first making of it"	19°44′S 147°48′E	Believed to refer to the current Cape Upstart.
Cape Bowling Green	5 June		19°18′S 147°24′E	
Cape Cleveland	6 June	Either in honour of a John Clevland the Secretary to the Admiralty around that time, or after Cleveland, England where he was born. Cook spelled the name with an "e", adding to the confusion.	19°10′S 147°00′E	
Cleveland Bay	6 June	Either in honour of a John Clevland the Secretary to the Admiralty around that time, or after Cleveland, England where he was born. Cook spelled the name with an "e", adding to the confusion.	19°13′S 146°55′E	
Magnetical Isle	6 June	"the Compass did not traverse well when near it"	19°08′S 146°50′E	Now known as Magnetic Island.
Palm Isles	6 June	Joseph Banks and Zachary Hicks went ashore to collect coconuts, but found the palms to be cabbage palms	18°44′S 146°35′E	Now known as Palm Islands.
Halifax Bay	8 June	George Montagu-Dunk, 2nd Earl of Halifax was Secretary of State 1763–65	18°50′S 146°30′E	
Point Hillock	8 June		18°25′S 146°21′E	Now known as Hiilock Point on Hinchinbrook Island.
Cape Sandwich	8 June	John Montagu, 4th Earl of Sandwich	18°14′S 146°17′E	On Hinchinbrook Island.
Family Islands	8 June		18°01′S 146°10′E	Dunk Island is the largest of the Family Islands.
Dunk Island	8 June	George Montagu-Dunk, 2nd Earl of Halifax	17°56′48″S 146°09′22″E	
Rockingham Bay	8 June	Charles Watson-Wentworth, 2nd Marquess of Rockingham	18°08′S 146°04′E	
Double Point	8 June		17°38′58″N 146°08′54″E	Easternmost point in the locality of Cowley Beach.
Frankland Islands	9 June	Admiral Sir Thomas Frankland, 5th Baronet		17°09′49″S 146°00′42″E
Cape Grafton	9 June	Augustus FitzRoy, 3rd Duke of Grafton was Prime Minister when Cook sailed	16°51′55″S 145°55′00″E	
Fitzroy Island	9 June		16°56′S 146°00′E	
Green Island	10 June	"a Low green woody Island"	16°45′S 145°58′E	
Trinity Bay	10 June	discovered on Trinity Sunday	16°54′S 145°47′E	
Cape Tribulation	10 June	"because here began all our Troubles"	16°04′S 145°28′E	Cook hit a reef here, before changing course, and later that night hitting Endeavour Reef.
Hope Island	13 June	"we were always in hopes of being able to reach these Islands"	15°43′S 145°27′E	
Weary Bay	13 June		15°54′S 145°22′E	
Endeavour River	14 June – 4 August	HM Bark Endeavour	15°27′30″S 145°14′00″E	Ship beached while repairs conducted, near modern-day Cooktown
Cape Bedford	4 August	Probably after John Russell, 4th Duke of Bedford, who had been First Lord of the Admiralty, 1744–47	15°13′S 145°20′E	
Cape Flattery	10 August	"We now judged ourselves to be clear of all Danger, having, as we thought, a Clear, open Sea before us; but this we soon found otherwise"	14°56′S 145°21′E	
Islands of Direction	10 August		14°44′S 145°30′E	South Direction Island and North Direction Island
Point Lookout	11 August		14°49′S 145°13′E	Not to be confused with the Point Lookout which Cook had earlier so named, being the north-eastern point of North Stradbroke Island.
Lizard Island	12 August	"only land Animals we saw here were Lizards, and these seem'd to be pretty Plenty"	14°40′S 145°27′E	Lizard Island still enjoys a substantial population of huge monitor lizards.
Eagle Island	12 August	"We found on this Island a pretty number of Birds, the most of them sea Fowl, except Eagles; 2 of the Latter we shott and some of the others"	14°41′S 145°22′E	
Providential Channel	17 August	providence	12°36′S 143°49′E	
Cape Weymouth	17 August	Thomas Thynne, 1st Marquess of Bath, Viscount Weymouth was one of the Secretaries of State when the Endeavour sailed	12°36′S 143°26′E	
Weymouth Bay	17 August	Thomas Thynne, 1st Marquess of Bath	12°29′S 143°20′E	
Forbes Islands	19 August	Admiral John Forbes was a Commissioner of Longitude in 1768, and had been a Lord of the Admiralty 1756–63	12°17′S 143°24′E	
Bolt Head	19 August		12°15′S 143°06′E	
Sir Charles Hardy's Isles	18 August		11°55′S 143°28′E	
Temple Bay	19 August	Richard Grenville-Temple, 2nd Earl Temple, brother of George Grenville, was First Lord of the Admiralty in 1756	12°18′S 143°08′E	
Cockburn Islands	19 August	Admiral George Cockburn was a Commissioner of Longitude and Comptroller of the Navy when Cook left England.	11°51′S 143°18′E	
Cape Grenville	19 August	George Grenville	11°58′S 143°15′E	
Shelburne Bay	20 August		11°49′S 142°58′E	
Orfordness	20 August		11°17′S 142°49′E	
New Castle Bay	21 August		10°53′S 142°36′E	
York Cape	21 August	Prince Edward, Duke of York and Albany	10°41′S 142°31′E	The northern tip of Australia's east coast now known as Cape York was named by Cook. Cape York Peninsula is the entire promontory between the Gulf of Carpentaria and the Coral Sea (Pacific Ocean) and was not named by Cook (who did not enter the Gulf of Carpentaria), but its name is derived from the name Cook gave to its northern tip.
York Isles	21 August	Prince Edward, Duke of York and Albany	10°41′S 142°31′E	
Possession Island	22 August	"in the Name of His Majesty King George the Third took possession of the whole Eastern coast from the above Latitude [38°S] down to this place by the Name of New Wales^{1}" However, the Admiralty's instructions did not authorized Cook to annex New Holland (Australia), so there was no possession ceremony. Cook re-wrote his hilltop signalling drill as a possession ceremony when he learnt that the French had preceded him across the Pacific.	10°43′36″S 142°23′49″E	^{1}"The Admiralty copy, as well as that belonging to Her Majesty, calls it New South Wales."
Prince of Wales's Isles	22 August	George Augustus Frederick, Prince of Wales	10°41′02″S 142°11′06″E	
Cape Cornwall	22 August		10°46′S 142°11′E	SW point of Prince of Wales Island
Wallis Isles	23 August	probably after Captain Samuel Wallis, who made a voyage across the Pacific in the Dolphin in 1767, and discovered Tahiti	10°52′S 141°57′E	
Endeavours Strait	23 August	HMB Endeavour	10°49′S 142°06′E	
Booby Island	23 August	"mostly a barren rock frequented by Birds, such as Boobies"	10°36′S 141°54′E	

== See also ==
- List of New Zealand places named by James Cook
