= Cape York (Queensland) =

Cape in Queensland, Australia

Coordinates: 10.688611°S 142.531667°E

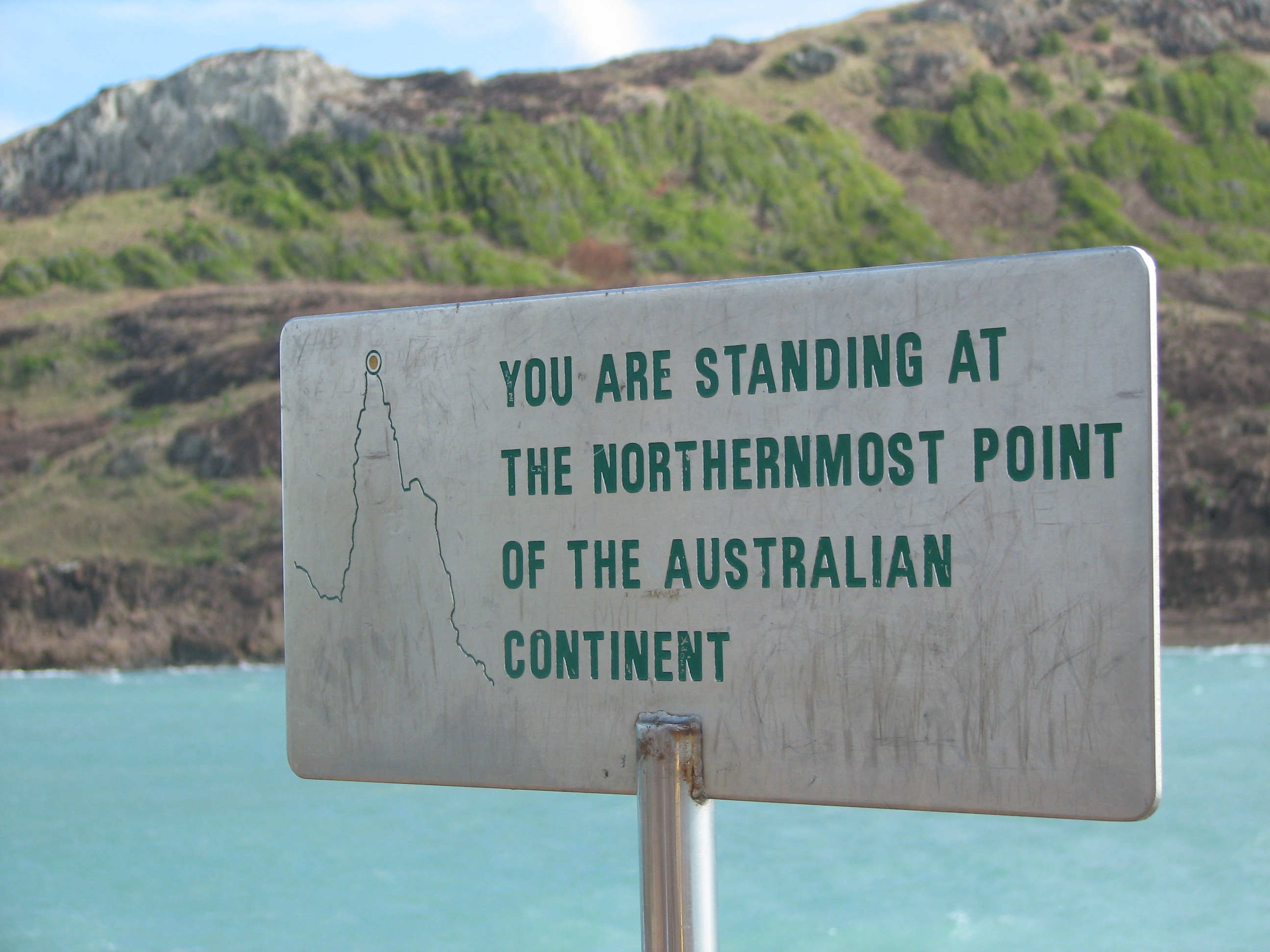
Cape York, 2007

Cape York, also known by its Indigenous name Pajinka, is the northernmost point of the mainland of Australia. It is within the locality of Somerset in the Shire of Torres, Queensland.

== History ==
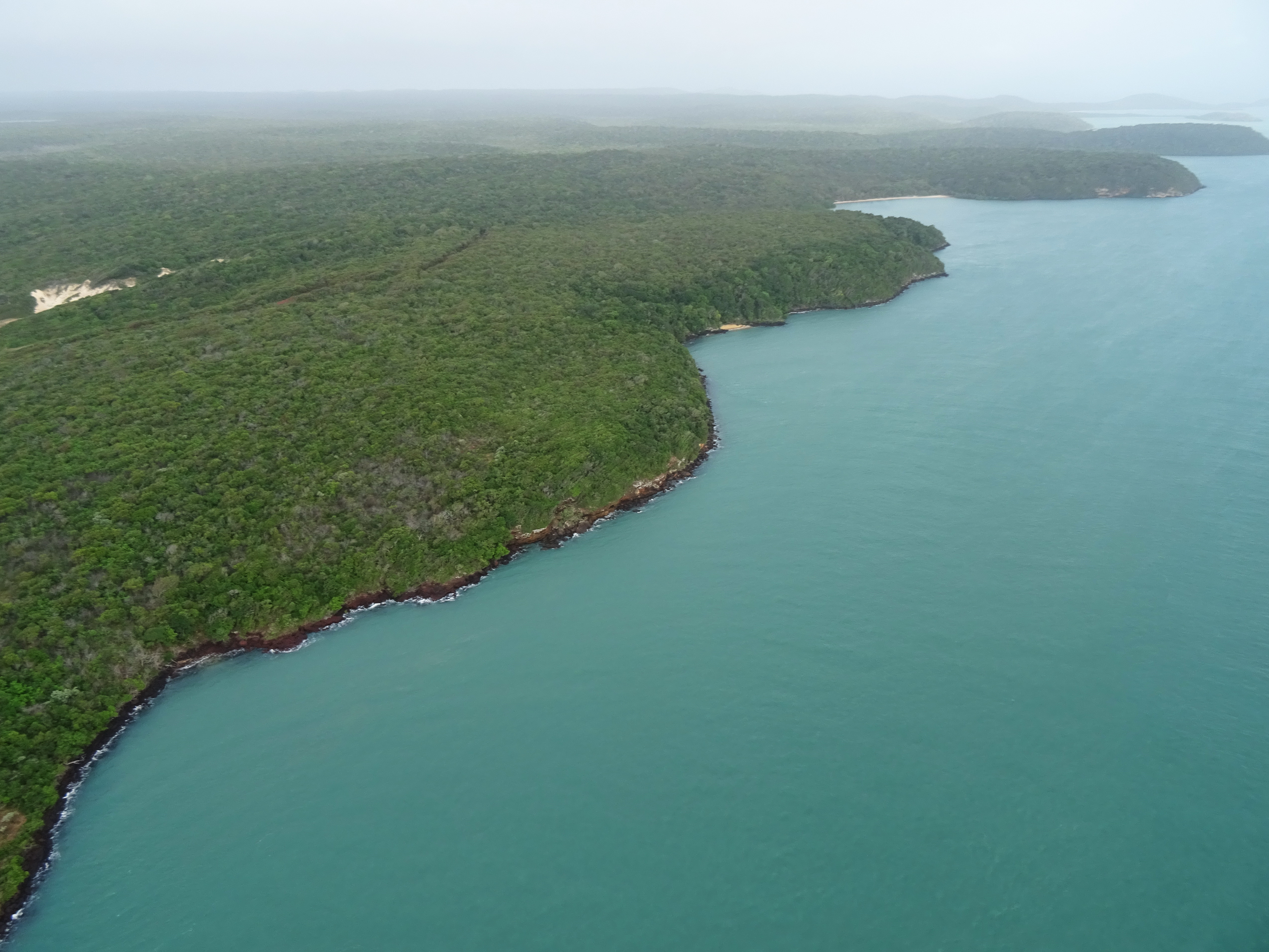
Cape York aerial view, 2018

The original inhabitants of the Cape York were the Djagaraga peoples.

Cape York was named by Lieutenant James Cook on his first voyage of exploration along the eastern coast of Australia in 1770. He named it on 21 August 1770 "in honour of His Royal Highness, the Duke of York" referring to Prince Edward, Duke of York and Albany.

Although its name derives from Cape York, the Cape York Peninsula was not named by Cook and refers to the much larger peninsula that lies between the Gulf of Carpentaria and the Coral Sea. Cook did not enter the Gulf of Carpentaria.
