= W. P. Auld =

South Australian vigneron and wine merchant (1840–1912

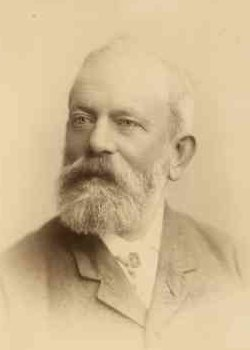
William Patrick Auld c. 1880

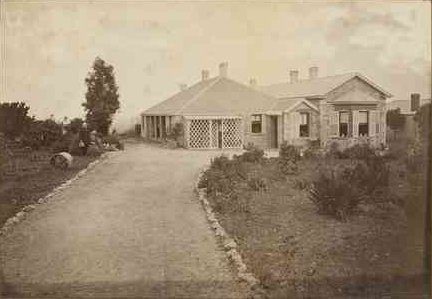
Auldana homestead c. 1876. Built in 1852 by Patrick Auld and occupied by the family until 1888. (Mr. & Mrs. P.Auld on the left of the picture.)

William Patrick Auld (27 May 1840 – 2 September 1912), usually known as W. P. Auld, Pat or Patrick, was an Adelaide, South Australian vigneron and wine merchant born in Stalybridge (near Manchester, England).

He took part in John McDouall Stuart's sixth expedition (Dec 1861 – Dec 1862) which successfully crossed Australia from south to north. He was also a member of B. T. Finniss's 1864 expedition to select a capital for the Northern Territory, during which an incident occurred resulting in his being tried for murder of an Aboriginal man.

For many years he managed his father's famous vineyard, "Auldana" in the eastern foothills, and was recognised as an accomplished vigneron and wine judge. The suburb Auldana is located on the site of the vineyard.

== Father founds "Auldana" ==
Patrick and Eliza Auld, with son William Patrick and daughters Agnes and Georgiana, arrived in South Australia on 6 April 1842 on the Fortitude, as did James Philcox. The father set up as a wine and spirit merchant in the Old Exchange Buildings in Hindley Street and shortly after purchased two lots of land, each of 230 acres at £1 per acre, in Magill which he named "Auldana". In 1847 or 1849 the father sold the Hindley Street business to Messrs. Disher and Milne and the family returned to England, enrolling the son at an institution named "King's College", perhaps King's College School.

The father returned to Adelaide alone in 1852, building a residence on one block of "Auldana" and between 1846 and 1856 developed the other as a vineyard which in February 1862 he floated the South Auldana Vineyard Association with a capital of £12,500. Directors of the Association were Abraham Scott, George Tinline (banker and uncle of Sir George Murray), John Hodgkiss, Patrick Auld and William Wadham. In 1863 they sent a shipment of wines to the London Exhibition which was favourably received, but the Association went into voluntary liquidation in October 1865. Around this time he set up a wine export business in Gilbert Place. In 1876 he had 104 acres under vines.

== Education and employment ==
In 1853 or 1854, the family returned to South Australia where a young W. P. Auld completed his education at J. L. Young's Adelaide Educational Institution, and secured a cadet position with G. W. Goyder, Surveyor General of South Australia.

== Stuart's sixth expedition ==
In 1861, W. P. Auld he was selected to join the sixth Stuart expedition.

John McDouall Stuart officially set out on 25 October 1861 from ... the residence of James and Catherine Chambers in North Adelaide. The party physically left Adelaide on 7 November. This was his third, and ultimately successful attempt to cross Australia. On 24 July 1862, they planted the Union Jack on the beach of Van Diemen's Gulf. The Expedition completed the first European crossing of Australia, from Adelaide to Van Diemen Gulf, passing through the Centre of the Continent, and returning along the same route without loss of life.

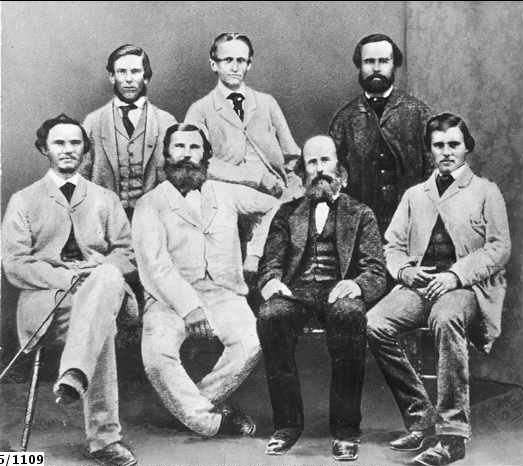
1861 Auld Billiat Thring Frew Kekwick Waterhouse King absent: Stuart Nash McGorrery

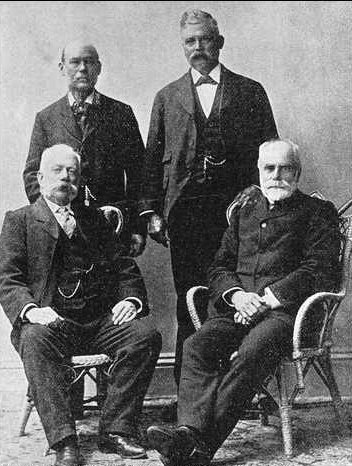
1900 Nash King Auld Thring

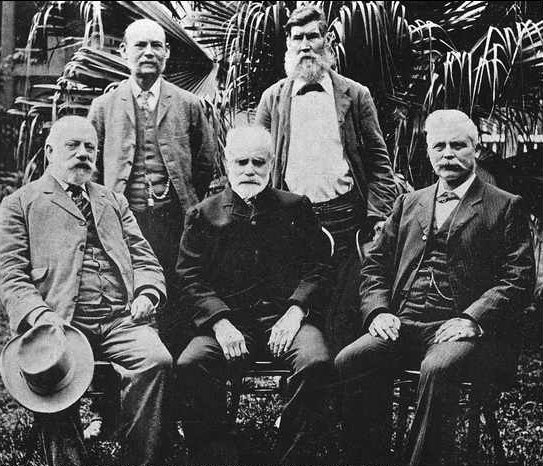
1904 Nash Gorrery Auld Thring King

== The Finniss expedition ==
In 1864 the South Australian government charged B. T. Finniss with finding a suitable site by the Adelaide River for the capital of the Northern Territory to be called "Palmerston". Auld, employed as a chainman, was one of the party of 40 that left Port Adelaide on the barque "Henry Ellis" on 29 April 1864 for Adam Bay. He, with several other young "labourers", aroused considerably antagonism among the officer class in the expedition by receiving preferential treatment from Finniss, one of several sources of dissension in a rather dysfunctional organization. He was a member of the exploration party led by surgeon Belgrave Ninnis which explored areas west of the Adelaide River as far as Howard River and King Creek on HMS Beatrice and arrived at Port Darwin in April 1865. Auld's role was to lead overland a party consisting of G. Warland. W. Dougall, F. Litchfleld, Dr Ninnes [sic], and Fred. Finniss, which crossed the Adelaide River on 17 April, named the Howard River for the captain of the Beatrice on 20 April, met Beatrice at Port Darwin before returning to camp. The Bengal had arrived and several expeditioners, including Auld, opted to pay the fare home rather than stay. Several others opted to sail west on a boat (Forlorn Hope) they purchased from the captain of the Bengal.

=== Murders of Aboriginals ===
During the Finniss expedition Auld was involved in a punitive expedition against the Woolna tribe of Aboriginal Australians from Chambers Bay, some 8 miles (13 km) from Escape Cliffs, who had stolen goods and seriously wounded several horses with their spears. During this action an old Aboriginal man was taken prisoner and shot several times, with Auld being co-accused of the crime.

(from a letter from Auld to his father)

The Colonel (Finniss) then gave orders that seven horsemen were to be in readiness to start next morning and try to find the natives' camp, and recover the goods they had stolen from us, and to treat them as felons. I went over to Chambers' Bay with two men, acting as scouts. Fifty (natives) tried to surround us. I shot at one, and sent one of the men to tell the footmen to come to our assistance. They were showing real fighting. Directly the footmen made their appearance the blacks disappeared like magic into the shrub. We recovered a quantity of the stores and goods. The Doctor, (Dr Walker, Protector of Aborigines) I believe, has brought a charge against me for shooting the black. He sent it to the Governor, but he would not receive it; so I hear be intends sending it to Adelaide. It is only done out of ill-feeling to the Colonel.

In another letter, he wrote

The natives are not very numerous here, but they are great thieves and very cunning and artful. There have been two shot by our party here; one, I think was justifiable, and the other a cold-blooded murder.

The two deaths referred to were presumably that inflicted by Alaric Ward (no relation to Ebenezer Ward, mentioned below) on 9 August 1864 and that of 8 September 1864 for which Auld was charged.

At the trial no evidence was brought for the prosecution, rather there was a report that the man shot at (named Dombey or Bombey) was still alive, although it was clear from testimonies that the victim was shot first in the stomach and then in the head after being taken prisoner. Auld was acquitted when the two witnesses did not take the stand (one, Francis James Packard, brother of H. D. Packard, had drowned in the Murray and the other, a man named McDougall, (Note: No McDougall has been found in the lists of participants, but may be the worker elsewhere named William Dougall or Dugald.) Auld's co-accused, left for England once he reached Melbourne. Auld, rather than counting his blessings, aroused considerable public antipathy by then attempting to claim costs from parliament, a move which was defeated after strenuous opposition from (among others) H. B. T. Strangways, who was contemptuous of Auld's defence that he was following Finniss's orders.

== Back in Adelaide ==
On 1 September Police trooper Potter was sent to Adam Bay 23 September 1866 on the "Ellen Lewis" with warrants for the arrest of Auld's fellow-accused William Dougall and Adam Chandler. Auld (who had returned earlier, perhaps by the "Coorong" on 6 April 1866) had already been charged and was out on bail.

On 15 November 1866 he married Eliza Hartland Strawbridge (1842? – 20 February 1916), eldest daughter of William S. Strawbridge (1843–1911), who replaced Goyder as Surveyor General. Eliza wrote poetry in collaboration with her mother, Eliza Stockholm Strawbridge (1818–1897). and published a volume of her own in 1913.

Their daughter, Edith Mary Auld (30 October 1867–25 August 1928) married Edward E. Cleland.

Elder son William George "George" Auld (3 December 1868 – 24 February 1926) was for some time partner in W. P. Auld and Sons. He was elected auditor for the District of Burnside. and for some years councillor for the East Norwood ward of the Town of Kensington and Norwood council. and was a longtime secretary of the Phylloxera Board and president of the South Australian Winegrowers' Association. As a young man he was a keen rower and lacrosse player and later served in executive positions associated with these sports. He was a lover of horses and rode with the Adelaide Hunt Club. He was a voracious reader and admirer of Dickens; he was a member of Union Parliament.

Younger son Ernest Patrick "Pat" Auld (10 March 1870 – 2 November 1938) was at one time partner in W. P. Auld and Sons, then manager of Tusmore branch of Triton Insurance. He was foundation president of Kensington Cricket Club, secretary of the South Australian branch of the Royal Empire Society and for several years president of the Adelaide Dual Club, whose aims were the appreciation of arts and science.

A son, born 24 September 1871, lived only a few hours.

Another daughter, Eliza Adeline (3 September 1872 – 19 December 1872), died of whooping cough.

== Auldana Vineyard ==
In 1869 his father Patrick returned to England to advance his wine business, opening the Auldana Vineyard Office at Walbrook House at 37 Walbrook Street, London EC in 1869. In 1870 he handed the business over to Messrs. Leigh and Apps Smith, and the office was moved to Fenchurch Street. In 1871 he formed a partnership Auld, Burton and Co. of Mill Street, behind Hanover Square, to handle his wines. In 1882 Mr. Hally Burton declared himself bankrupt and the trustees sold his share of the business to his assistant Mr. Cocks, who was then stripped of his franchise for unauthorised use of the "Auldana" brand. Around this time the business was renamed Australian Wine Co with an emu for its logo and was in 1885 sold to Aylwin Pownall and as Emu Wine Co. became a major importer of Australian wines to Britain and Canada.

Around 1881, in failing health, Patrick and his daughter moved to New Zealand where he spent his last years, dying at Norman Hill, a suburb of Onehunga near Auckland in 1886, aged 75.

== W. P. Auld and Sons Ltd. ==
In 1888, after his father's death, W. P. Auld sold "Auldana" to its mortgagee Josiah Symon, leaving his home of 43 years. but retained the Gilbert Place business, which in 1910 became W. P. Auld and Sons Ltd. with his sons W. G. "George" Auld and E. P. Auld as executive officers. It is not recorded whether W. P. Auld retained any interest in the company.

George Auld was for many years the company's traveller and E. P. Auld was secretary at least until 1914. In 1923 the company became part of Adelaide Wine and Spirit Co. Ltd. at Hackney Road, Hackney with Walkerville Cooperative Brewing Co. Ltd. the major shareholders, and W. G. Auld as chairman and president. The company was liquidated in 1940. George was for several years president of the Vinegrowers' Association. A third-generation descendant of W. P. Auld, Michael Auld, was manager of Stonyfell Winery's vineyards and cellars around 1950 and a fourth-generation descendant, George Patrick Auld, was in 1977 managing director of Angle Vale Vineyards Pty. Ltd.

== Public life ==
In 1893 he was elected president of the South Australian Vignerons' Association. For many years he was a member of the Royal Agricultural & Horticultural Society of South Australia and frequently served as a wine judge. He was a keen horseman (he often rode with Adam Lindsay Gordon) and a foundation member of the Adelaide Hunt Club. He was a council member of the Adelaide branch of the Royal Geographic Society and at one time president of the Australian Natives' Association. As a younger man he was interested in amateur theatricals, and was, with W. S. Strawbridge and old-school chum W. H. Phillipps, a member of the Clayton Young Men's Society, and again with Phillipps, the Norwood Young Men's Society He served for a time as councillor for the Magill ward in the District of Burnside. He was also an active member of the South Australian Free Rifle Corps.

== Family ==
W. P. Auld was the son of Patrick Auld (1811 – 21 January 1886) and Eliza Auld (née McKinnell, 1806 – 8 July 1873).

Patrick Auld (1811 – 21 January 1886) married Eliza McKinnell (1806 – 8 July 1873) c. 1835

- Agnes Auld (c. 1837 – 24 June 1886) married James Pollard (c. 1833 – 6 November 1900) on 10 November 1859, lived at Kapunda then Eudunda.
- Georgina Auld (1838 – 28 November 1917) never married and lived with her father towards the end of his life; died at the home of her niece Edith Mary Cleland.
- William Patrick Auld (27 May 1840 – 2 September 1912) married Eliza Hartland Strawbridge (c. 1842 – 20 February 1916) on 15 November 1866 (more details above)

- Edith Mary Auld (30 October 1867 – 25 August 1928) married Edward Erskine Cleland (c. 1869 – 1 July 1943) on 12 April 1893
- William George "George" Auld (3 December 1868 – 24 February 1926) married Ellen Howard "Nellie" Clark (30 July 1861 – 4 November 1936) on 12 August 1893. Nellie was a daughter of John Howard Clark.
- Ernest Patrick "Pat" Auld (10 March 1870 – 2 November 1938)

Two of Patrick's brothers also migrated to South Australia:

John Auld (1796 – 3 August 1860) arrived in SA in 1835, possibly overland. He was a publican in Adelaide, then of Gawler. He married Isabella Steele on 20 April 1850. They had no children.

Thomas Kirkpatrick Auld (1808 – ) immigrated September 1839 aboard Glenswilly. He was publican of "Walkers Arms", Walkerville 1847–1852, when it was transferred to John Mundy. He was declared insolvent 1849, and dropped out of sight. He married Marian Hutchison (died c. 1846) on 19 June 1843, then married Georgina Waters (died 28 November 1917) in August 1847. He appeared to have had no surviving children.

== Recognition ==
Auld's Lagoon and the district Auld, both in the greater Darwin area are named for him. Fred's Pass, in the Daly Ranges, and Fred's Pass Road (which, extended, became the Stuart Highway) were named by him for his fellow-explorer Fred Litchfield, whose name is also commemorated in the nearby Litchfield shire. The outer Darwin suburb of Fred's Pass is linked to the name of the old road, not the Pass itself.

The Adelaide suburb of Auldana stands on the site of the old vineyard. One street is named Patrick Auld Drive; others are named for grape varieties: Hermitage Road, Traminer Way, Shiraz Place, Verdelho Court.
