= Frederick Henry Litchfield =

Australian explorer

Frederick Henry Litchfield (27 May 1832 – 1 March 1867), pastoralist, gold miner, explorer, usually known as Fred, is a South Australian prominently associated with the early exploration of the Northern Territory, and more particularly with the discovery of gold there.

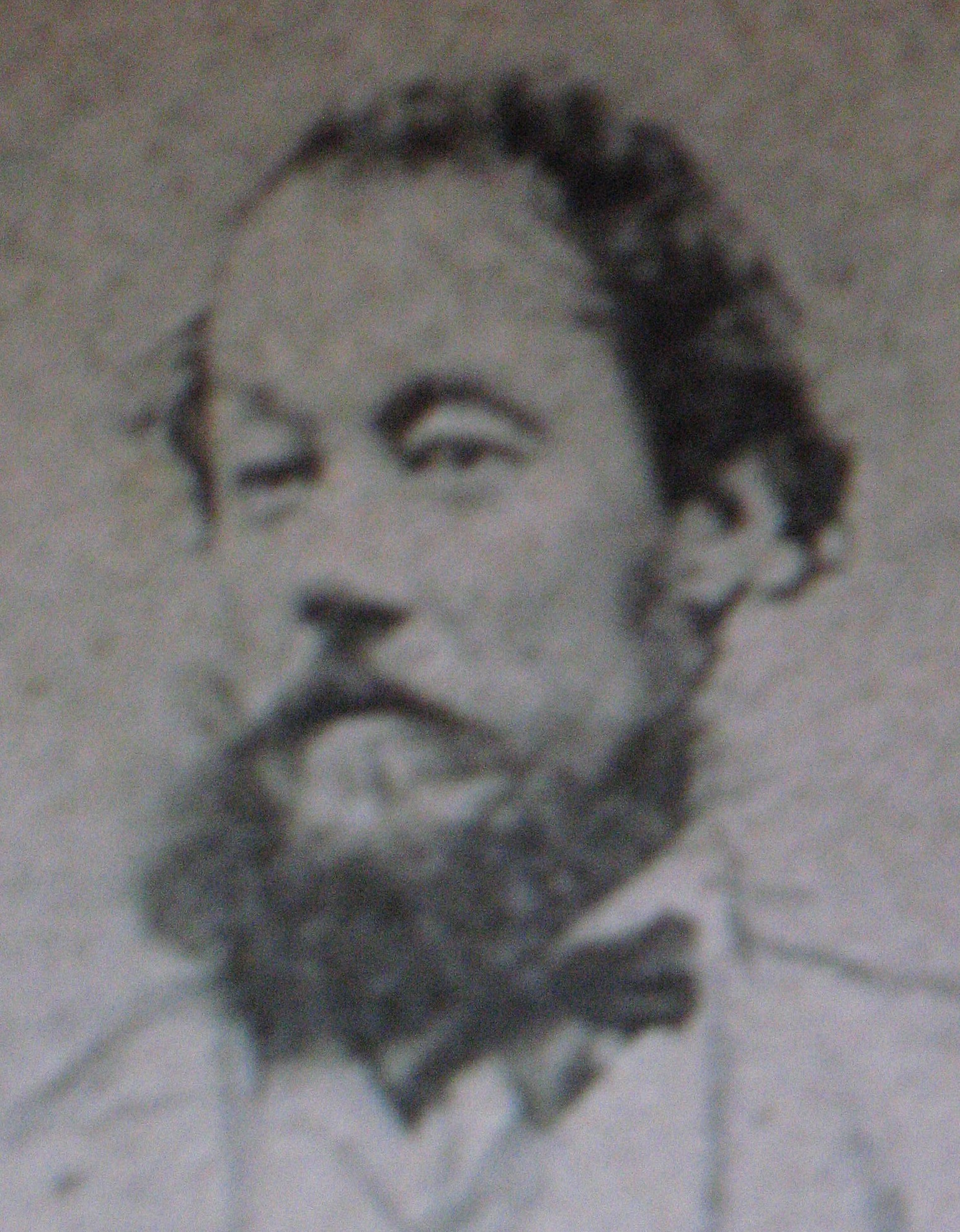
Portrait photo of Frederick Henry Litchfield (1832–1867).

== Early life ==
Litchfield was born in British India, on 27 May 1832, the eldest son of Charles William Litchfield (c.1802–1850), who was then serving in the 17th Foot of the British Army as a non-commissioned officer. His grandfather was a London surgeon and his lineage is reputedly connected to the Earl of Lichfield title in England. His mother was Margaret, nee O'Connor (1808–1834), but after she died young his father remarried in India in 1835 to Ellen Munro (1818–1908), daughter of Donald and Isabella Munro. Donald Munro (1785–1822), a Scot, also served in the 17th Foot.

His father later transferred to the 38th (1st Staffordshire) Regiment of Foot as sergeant-major. In 1836 the regiment returned from Bengal to be stationed at Enniskillen, Northern Ireland. In reward for his many years’ service in India, and pending his retirement, in July 1838 Sergeant-Major C.W. Litchfield was commissioned as ensign (rank), without purchase, and then in November 1838 retired from the army.

== South Australia ==
During that same year the extended Litchfield family decided upon emigration to South Australia. Charles William Litchfield and family (including six-year-old Fred) embarked at London on the D’Auvergne, arriving at Adelaide on 22 March 1839. Aboard the same ship were Charles' brother John and family, and sisters Mary and Anne. The brother, Dr John Palmer Litchfield, M.D., (1808–1869) had formerly practiced in London. Upon arrival at Adelaide, Dr Litchfield immediately commenced practice as a consulting physician, subsequently became the first Inspector of Hospitals in South Australia, and later moved to Canada where he died in 1869. One sister, Mary Walford Litchfield, died 1846, while the other, Anne Litchfield, married Thomas Reynolds, later the fifth Premier of South Australia. Much later, in 1851, another brother, Frederick Burnett Litchfield, arrived at Adelaide with his family, and became connected with the railways. His daughter, Louisa Jane Litchfield, married William Davy and were the parents of Dr Ruby Claudia Emily Davy, noted South Australian musician and composer.

In early 1840 Charles William Litchfield joined the newly formed (but short-lived) militia, the South Australian Volunteers, as its captain and adjutant, being thereafter generally known as Captain Litchfield. Police sub-inspector Alexander Tolmer held the other adjutant position in the S.A.V. On 17 June 1840, Litchfield was gazetted as a sub-inspector of the metropolitan (foot) branch of the South Australia Police. The man who appointed him was Thomas Shuldham O’Halloran, then newly appointed as Commissioner of Police, and a former lieutenant of the 17th Foot, with whom Litchfield had served in India. O’Halloran was also major-commandant of the S.A.V. militia.

Meanwhile, young Fred Litchfield's education began at a private day school in Adelaide, and was finished at the Oddfellows School, of which Lodge his father was an office-holder. The family grew rapidly, and younger half-brothers and half-sisters soon joined Fred.

Charles William Litchfield served ten years in the police, rising to Inspector rank and overall command of the Adelaide Metropolitan Police. Then, after a short illness, he died on 25 August 1850, aged 47 years, leaving a widow and nine children. His death was not without public controversy. Inspector Litchfield was highly esteemed but not wealthy. Many prominent citizens felt great sympathy for his widow and family. Police connections as well as members of his Oddfellows Lodge rapidly raised a considerable endowment. This was offered as a managed trust, rather than an outright gift, but it was refused by the widow on grounds that she wished to control her own financial destiny. The refusal of this charitable gesture caused many donors to become so indignant that they retracted their contribution.

== Victorian Goldfields ==
In 1851 Fred's sister, Agnes Theresa, married to mounted police Corporal George Ezekiel Mason, stationed at Wellington, South Australia, on the River Murray. Mason was also sub-protector of Aborigines. In view of his stepmother's grim financial situation, Fred joined them there, working as a labourer in the district. When the Victorian gold rush came, 21-year-old Fred was quick to head for the diggings to make his own way in life. Along with one of the Mason family, he sailed to Melbourne in January 1853 on the Dreadnought. The pair then led a knockabout life as gold-miners, without tangible success, until Fred returned to Wellington about 1858. Again unemployed, he had thoughts of obtaining his own grazing property there.

== Tolmer expedition ==
At Wellington, Fred was to again cross paths with Alexander Tolmer, whose police career was ignominiously over. Tolmer was now a settler there, but still had grand ambitions. In September 1859, with partly SA Government support, Tolmer commenced an exploration expedition to cross Central Australia and reach the north coast. Among those in his party of seven was Fred Litchfield, taken because he was "generally useful". Also in the party was ex-policeman Bernard Shaw of Wellington who, like Tolmer, had served with Fred's father. At that time there was fierce competition, notably with the privately sponsored party of John McDouall Stuart, to be first to succeed. Tolmer's badly organised expedition was a costly failure, being abandoned just beyond the northern Flinders Ranges. Litchfield received expenses but no wages. Meanwhile, Stuart's expedition went on to success and fame.

== Pastoralist ==
Litchfield's first experience of exploration having been a disappointment, he was again unemployed at Wellington, still looking for his own scrub run. On 21 October 1860, in partnership with his half-brother John Munro Litchfield, he took out an annual Crown Lands lease on a sheep run of some 42 square miles. This mallee scrubland run was located east of the River Murray near Wellington but was without water, which the brothers immediately began to sink for. Their uncle, Thomas Reynolds, then Premier of South Australia, paid for the lease and stock. Controversially, another half-brother, William Litchfield, who falsely claimed in the Insolvency Court that he also shared an interest in this run, was appointed Crown Lands Ranger at Wellington, which resulted in very public libel litigation by Thomas Reynolds against the Northern Star newspaper.

== Northern Territory ==
In 1864 the South Australian Government mounted an expedition to the Northern Territory for the purposes of survey and settlement. The leader was Boyle Finniss who, having been Commissioner of Police, knew Fred Litchfield's late father well. Having struggled to make a success of his pastoral run, Litchfield relinquished the lease to join the Finniss party of some forty officers and men as a stockman and labourer. Tolmer had recommended him as a good worker.

Finniss, who was instructed to examine the Adelaide River and environs, chose a settlement site at Escape Cliffs. Litchfield was 32 years old when he arrived by sea at this outpost in the Northern Territory, which he was immediately enthusiastic about.

In August 1864, Litchfield was assigned to a surveying depot at a site upstream from Escape Cliffs along the Adelaide River. Local Woolna men raided their supplies and Litchfield chased them away by shooting at them. Litchfield was later sent out with several other armed men to try and recover these supplies but were soon involved in a skirmish with around sixty Woolna. Up to three Woolna were shot dead, while Litchfield and another colonist suffered minor injuries from being speared.

During 1864–65 Litchfield's reputation rose as he, initially with surveyor W. P. Auld, took part in, and then led, exploration parties in the Howard River, Darwin, Northern Territory, Batchelor, Northern Territory, Adelaide River, Finniss River, and Daly River regions. In doing so, Litchfield was among the first Europeans to walk the area that became the streets of Darwin, Northern Territory. Having had experience on the Victorian goldfields, it was at the Finniss River that the presence of gold arrested his attention; hence Litchfield went down in history as the man who discovered gold in the Northern Territory. Being loyal and industrious, Litchfield was so well regarded by Finniss that on 28 July 1865 he was appointed Acting Inspector in command of his newly formed (and short-lived) Rural Constabulary, regarded by many as outside his authority.

Over time the decisions of Finniss became so criticised that the South Australian Government recalled the party with the intention of holding an inquiry into his conduct. In December 1865 the barque Ellen Lewis left the Northern Territory carrying Finniss and most of the witnesses, including Litchfield, to arrive back at Adelaide in February 1866. Litchfield then appeared as a witness favourable to Finniss at the Northern Territory Commission hearings that took place during March–April 1866.

== Death and legacy ==
Soon afterward, Fred Litchfield promptly left Adelaide to travel to Bengal to join his younger brother George who was interested in tea plantations, thereby returning to the place of his birth and infancy. In June 1866, the Litchfield family heard that 29-year-old George Charles Litchfield had died suddenly in Cachar, Bengal, on 10 March. The cause is unknown, but famine and disease was then raging in many districts of Bengal.

After settling George's affairs, Fred travelled about Bengal extensively, and in August 1866 wrote a letter to the Register newspaper in Adelaide comparing the similarities, yet the merits, of the Northern Territory over those of Bengal. It seems he was looking for crops which might suit the Territory. Fred Litchfield had been in Bengal only nine months when he died at Sylhet, Bengal, (now Bangladesh) on 1 March 1867, aged 35 years. The cause of death is unknown. He had never married.

In his time Litchfield was one of the few Europeans that could see great agricultural and pastoral prospects for the Northern Territory. His gold discovery, though inconclusive, stimulated the rush in the early 1870s that hastened its development. He is commemorated in the naming of Litchfield Municipality and Litchfield National Park, among other places.

As a tragic but somewhat connected postscript, in 1875 his aunt and uncle, Anne and Thomas Reynolds, who were his resolute supporters, were returning from the Northern Territory to Adelaide when they were lost in the wreck of the SS Gothenburg.
