= Painter (rope) =

Rope tied to a boat

A painter is a rope that is attached to the bow of a dinghy, or other small boat, and used for tying up or towing. Ideally, the painter should float. If used on a boat with a propeller, the length of the painter should be shorter than the distance to the propeller, to prevent fouling the engine.

== Canoeing ==
Canoes being used in moving water or whitewater are rigged with a painter at both the bow and stern. In addition to the functions mentioned above, a canoe's painters can be used for lining the boat down difficult sections, self-rescue, and boat recovery.

== See also ==
- Knot
- List of hitch knots
- List of knots
