= Holbourne Island National Park =

National park in Australia

- IUCN category II (national park)
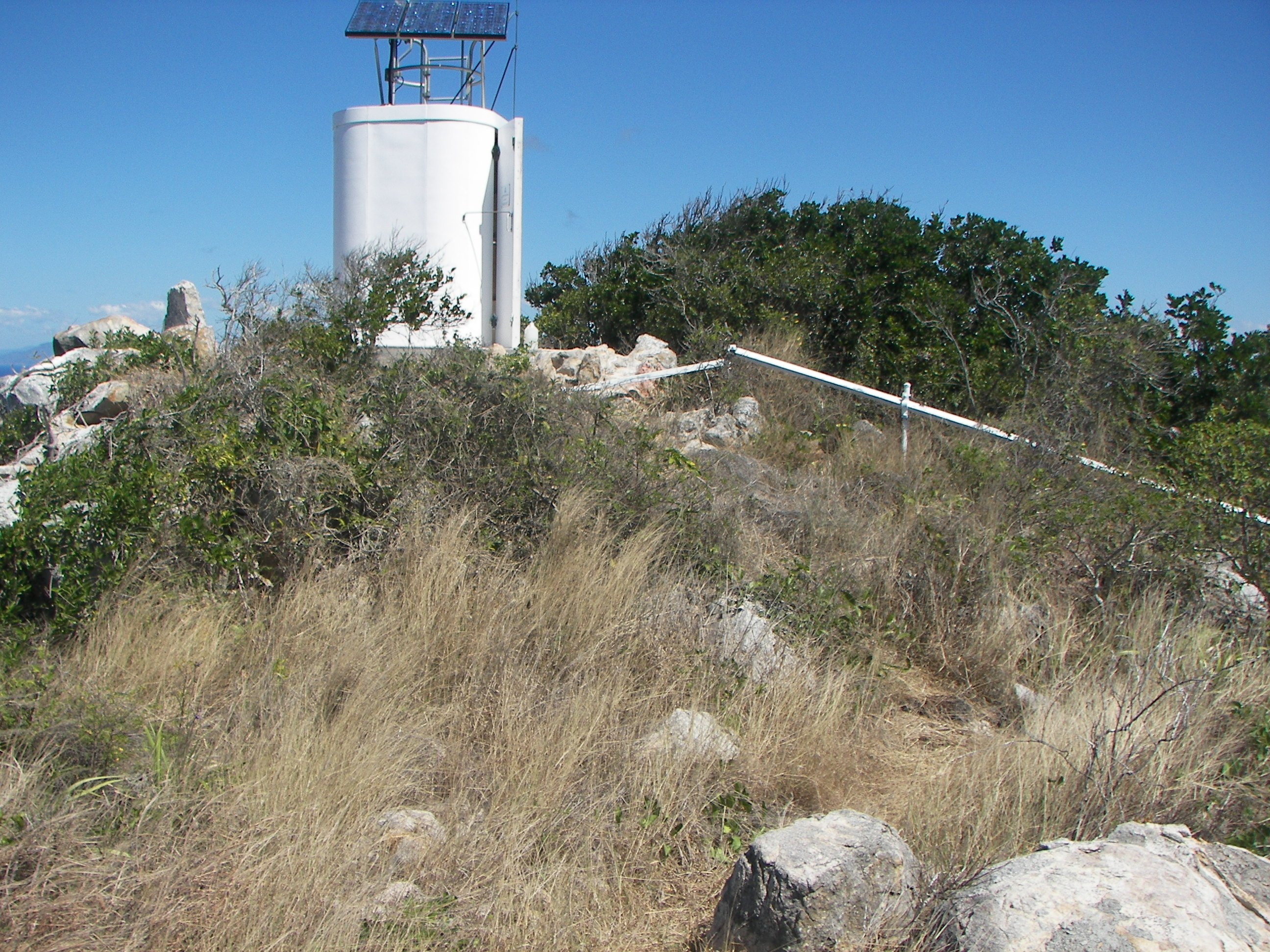
- Holbourne Island, 2007

- Location within Queensland
- Location: Queensland
- Coordinates: 19°43′38″S 148°21′32″E
- Area: 34 ha (84 acres)
- Established: 1982
- Governing body: Queensland Parks and Wildlife Service

Holbourne Island National Park is a national park in Queensland (Australia), 983 kilometres (611 mi) northwest of Brisbane.

== History ==
The island was named Holburn Isle by James Cook on his 1770 voyage in HMB Endeavour along the Australian east coast. It is now known as Holbourne Island and is protected within the Holbourne Island National Park.

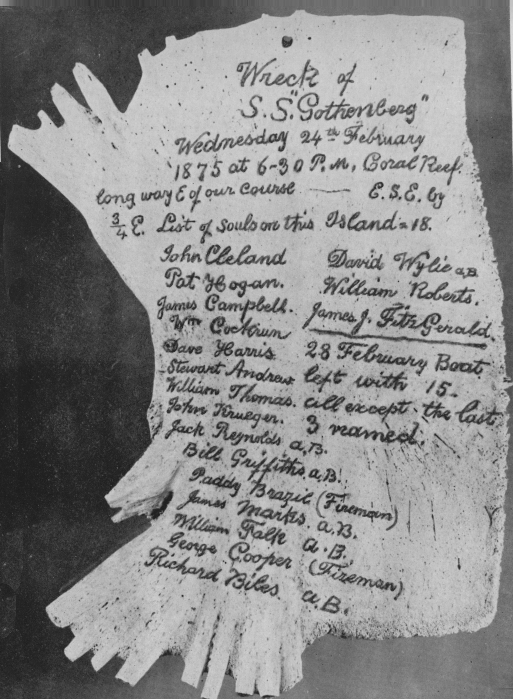
Gothenburg's Turtle Shell Roll

Holbourne Island became well known in 1875, when 18 survivors of the shipwreck SS Gothenburg reached its shores. Four survivors arrived on a damaged port lifeboat on 25 February, where they survived by eating raw bird's eggs and drinking rain water that had pooled in the island rocks. The following day, 14 survivors from a starboard lifeboat also landed. Because rescue was uncertain, the survivors engraved their names on the concave side of a large turtle shell, which is displayed in the South Australian Museum, on North Terrace in Adelaide.

On 28 February, 15 of them set off in the starboard lifeboat for an island about 20 miles (32 km) away to the south, which seemed to be more in the track of ships. A rescue ship sent looking for survivors of Gothenburg, picked up the group and took them safely to Bowen. The ship subsequently returned to Holbourne Island and rescued the three remaining survivors.

== Present day ==
As well as being a national park, Holbourne Island is well known as a natural bird sanctuary and turtle nesting area.

On 2 September 2001, the 50,000 gross ton bulk carrier Pax Phoenix departed Hay Point, Queensland bound for India via Singapore. While passing Holbourne Island, an oil slick was noticed and described as being 60 to 80 metres (200–260 ft) in width. Although there were concerns about the effect on the island and wildlife, it eventually dispersed naturally out to sea without impact.

Holbourne Island is often referred to as part of the Coral Sea's Bermuda Triangle, as several maritime mysteries are linked to the area.

== See also ==
- Protected areas of Queensland
