= B. T. Finniss =

Australian politician (1807–1893)

The Honourable B. T. Finniss
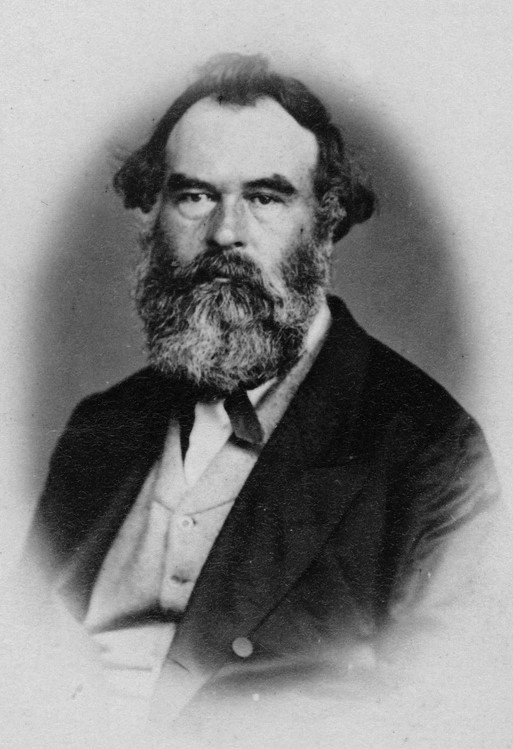
- Finniss, c. 1860

Administrator of South Australia
- In office 20 December 1854 – 8 June 1855
- Preceded by: Sir Henry Young as Governor
- Succeeded by: R.G. MacDonnell as Governor

1st Premier of South Australia
- In office 24 October 1856 – 20 August 1857
- Monarch: Victoria
- Governor: Sir Richard MacDonnell
- Succeeded by: John Baker

Chief Secretary of South Australia
- In office 28 January 1852 – 24 October 1856
- Preceded by: Charles Sturt
- Succeeded by: Office of Premier established
- In office 14 May 1849 – 25 August 1849
- Preceded by: Alfred Mundy
- Succeeded by: Charles Sturt

Treasurer of South Australia
- In office 12 June 1858 – 9 May 1860
- Premier: Sir Richard Hanson
- Preceded by: John Hart
- Succeeded by: Thomas Reynolds
- In office 28 April 1847 – 3 January 1852
- Preceded by: Charles Sturt
- Succeeded by: Sir Robert Torrens

Member of the South Australian House of Assembly
- In office 9 March 1857 – 23 November 1862
- Preceded by: Seat established
- Succeeded by: Allan McFarlane
- Constituency: City of Adelaide (1857–1860); Mount Barker (1860–1862)

Member of the South Australian Legislative Council
- In office 1 May 1847 – 8 March 1857

Commissioner of the South Australian Police
- In office 13 April 1843 – 12 May 1847
- Preceded by: Thomas O'Halloran
- Succeeded by: Captain Dashwood

Deputy Surveyor-General of South Australia
- In office 24 August 1839 – April 1843
- Succeeded by: Thomas Burr the two served together from 1839

Personal details
- Born: Boyle Travers Finniss; 18 August 1807 Off the Cape of Good Hope, Africa
- Died: 24 December 1893 (aged 86) Kensington Park, South Australia
- Resting place: West Terrace Cemetery
- Spouse(s): Anne Rogerson (d.1858); Sophia Lynch

Military service
- Allegiance: United Kingdom
- Branch/service: British Army
- Years of service: 1825–1835
- Rank: Lieutenant
- Unit: 88th Regiment; 56th Regiment; 82nd Regiment

Boyle Travers Finniss (18 August 1807 – 24 December 1893) was the first premier of South Australia, serving from 24 October 1856 to 20 August 1857.

== Surveyor ==
Finniss joined Light in a private surveying firm, Light, Finniss & Co. While in private enterprise, Light and Finniss surveyed several towns, including Glenelg and Gawler. Finniss also had several other business interests, but they eventually all failed, and he returned to the public service.

== Public service and political career ==
=== 1864 expedition to the Northern Territory ===
He was not popular with his men or officers. They expected to spend time exploring and not on tedious duties such as keeping guard on the stores. Finniss had not secured adequate supplies for the expedition, and did not enjoy good relations with the local Aboriginal people.

On 9 August 1864, during one of Finniss's absences, James Manton sent a party on horseback to recover stores which had been plundered by Aboriginals. When approaching the Aboriginal camp, the party was surrounded by spear-carrying warriors, who injured a horse and several men. William Pearson was quite seriously wounded, and fellow-riders Fred Litchfield and Dyer removed him from the scene. When a second party arrived on foot, the tribesmen scattered, but one was shot dead by Alaric Ward.

A month later, the Aboriginal people mounted another raiding party, spearing several horses, which led to a great deal of anger in the depot. Finniss put his son Frederick in charge of an armed party sent out to Chambers Bay, about 8 miles (13 km) distant, to assert some kind of control (Finniss's instructions were not published). Dr. Francis Goldsmith, who, apart from his medical duties, had been appointed Protector of Aborigines, demanded a place in the party, but was ordered by Finniss to remain at the depot. The Aboriginal people fled their camp, but one unarmed old man, named as "Dombey", was shot in the back. Having recovered whatever property they could, the party then set fire to the dwellings of the Aboriginal people. Returning to the depot, they were hailed as conquering heroes and each treated to a tot of rum. On 20 September, Finniss appointed his son clerk-in-charge and accountant, in place of Ebenezer Ward, whom Finniss had suspended for disloyalty. Auld was charged with the murder of "Dombey", but was acquitted.

In May 1865, a dissident party of seven men fled to Champion Bay, Western Australia, in a small boat dubbed Forlorn Hope, and Finniss was eventually recalled. He was summoned before a Parliamentary Commission in May 1866 and answered his critics point by point, supported by a printed pamphlet, to the annoyance of influential financier Frank Rymill, a major critic.

== Other interests ==
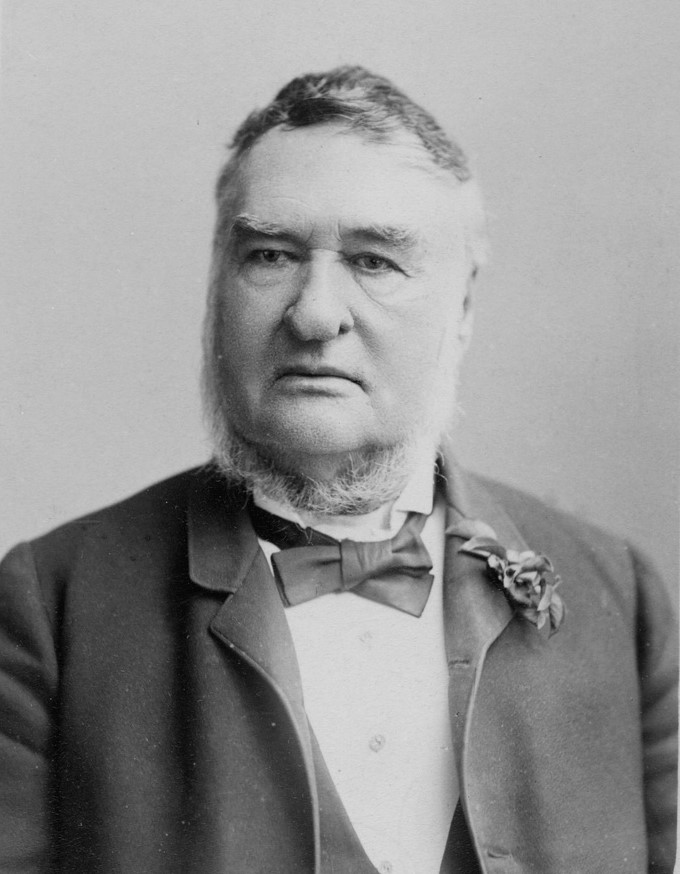

Finniss was on the board of at least one business, the Duryea Mining Company, and was chairman of directors from 1862.

In 1860, he published a martial anthem The Gathering : A War Song of Australia, and a love song Can'st thou not read?, both set to music by Mrs. A. J. Murray.

== Family ==
He married Anne Frances Rogerson on 13 August 1835, who died on 3 January 1858. On 3 May 1878, he married Sophia Florence Maud Lynch. His eldest daughter, Fanny Lipson Finniss (later Morgan), was the first European girl born in South Australia, on 31 December 1836 or 1 January 1837. Finniss's employee, James Hoare, was father of the first boy, on 7 November 1836.

Finniss married Anne Frances Rogerson (1819–1858) on 13 August 1835 at St. Audoen's, Dublin, Ireland

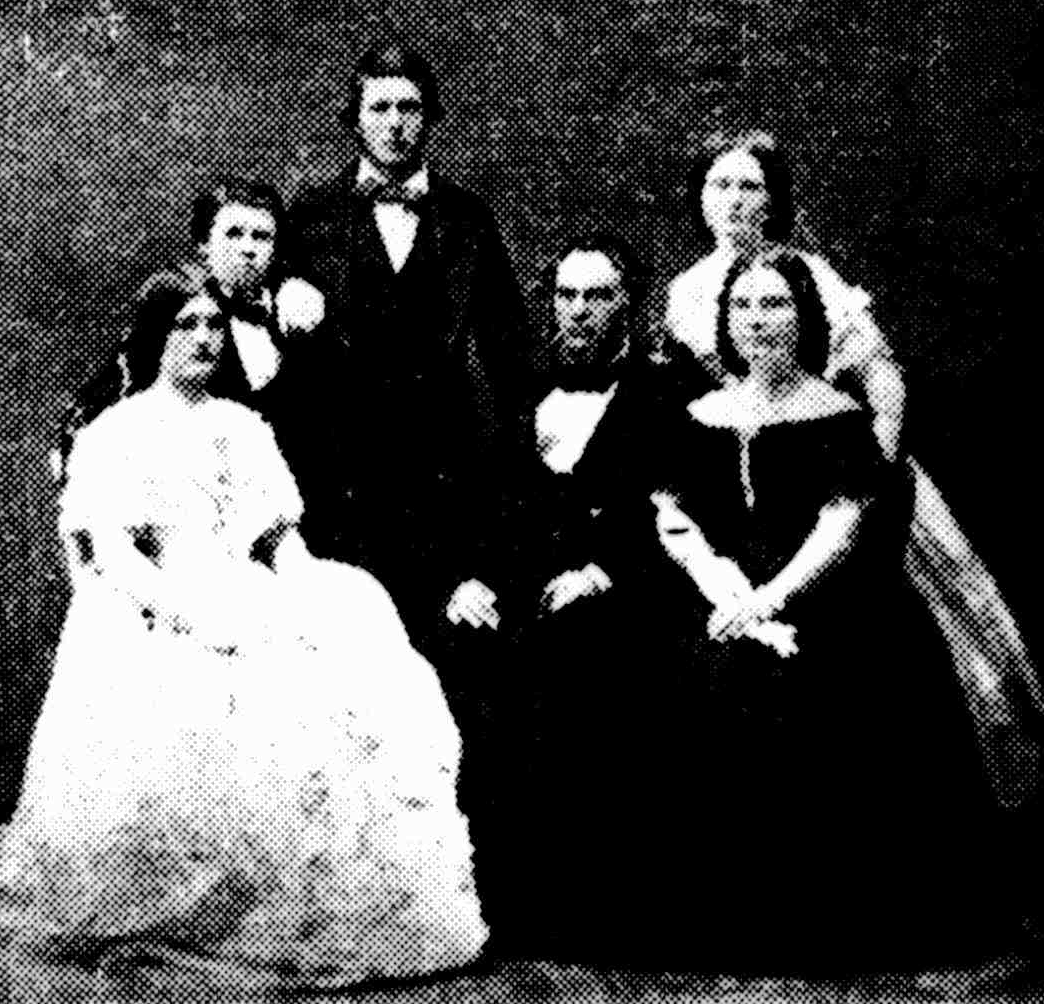
Fanny, Fred, William, Julia, Emily, surrounding B. T. Finniss

- Fanny Lipson Finniss (1837–1865) married Frederick George Morgan (1826–1900)
- Boyle Travers Nixon Finniss (1839–1853)
- Julia Howard Finnis (1840–1918)
- William Charles Maxwell Finniss (1842–1919)
- Emily Anne Finniss (1844–1929)
- Henry John Finniss (1845–1846)
- Frederick Robe Finniss (1847–1908) accompanied his father to Escape Cliffs in 1864

He married again, to Sophia Florence Maud Lynch (1852–1925) on 3 May 1878 at St Matthew's Church, Kensington, South Australia They had a further two children:

- Coraly Newton Maud Finniss (1884–1890)
- Ethel Maude Mary Finniss (1890–1976)

== Legacy ==
In January 1859, Peter Egerton-Warburton reported that he and his group of explorers had found several freshwater springs near Mount Hamilton in northern South Australia, and had named "by far the finest batch of springs yet discovered" Finniss Springs, after B. T. Finniss. Surveyor Edward Giles' group passed the springs in May of that year. By December 1862, there was a cattle station called Finniss Springs Cattle Station, run by John Watherstone.

The Finniss River in South Australia and Finniss River in the Northern Territory are both named after him, as well as the South Australian Electoral district of Finniss.

Finniss Street, in North Adelaide was one of the dozens of street names chosen by the Street Naming Committee in around 1840, to commemorate people of importance to the founding of Adelaide. Boyle Street and Finniss Street in the Adelaide suburbs of Marion and Oaklands Park were named in about 1856.

In 1940, Queen's Own Town, about 60 km south of Adelaide, was renamed Finniss.

== See also ==
- Survey parties to the Northern Territory 1864–1870 Includes comprehensive lists of participants

South Australian Legislative Council
Preceded by Charles Sturt; John Morphett	Member of the South Australian Legislative Council; 1847–1857; Served alongside: Multiple Members	Succeeded by Henry Ayers; Charles Bagot; Charles Davies; Charles Everard; Thomas O'Halloran; Abraham Scott
South Australian House of Assembly
New district	Member of Parliament for City of Adelaide; 1857–1860; Served alongside: Robert Torrens, Richard Hanson, Francis Dutton, John Neales; William Burford, Judah Solomon, William Owen	Succeeded by Philip Santo
Preceded by William Rogers	Member of Parliament for Mount Barker; 1860–1862; Served alongside: John Dunn	Succeeded by Allan McFarlane
Political offices
Preceded by Alfred Mundy	Colonial Secretary of South Australia; 1849	Succeeded by Charles Sturt
Preceded by Charles Sturt	Colonial Secretary of South Australia; 1851–1856	Continues as Chief Secretary of South Australia
New title	Premier of South Australia; 1856–1857	Succeeded by John Baker
Continues from Colonial Secretary of South Australia	Chief Secretary of South Australia; 1856–1857	Succeeded by John Baker
Preceded by John Hart	Treasurer of South Australia; 1858–1860	Succeeded by Thomas Reynolds
-
Government offices
Preceded by George Milner Stephen	Administrator of South Australia; 1854–1855	Succeeded by Francis Hamley
-
Preceded by Charles Augustus FitzRoy	Government Resident of the Northern Territory; 1864-1865	Succeeded by William Bloomfield Douglas
