= Centre points of Australia =

Geographical feature

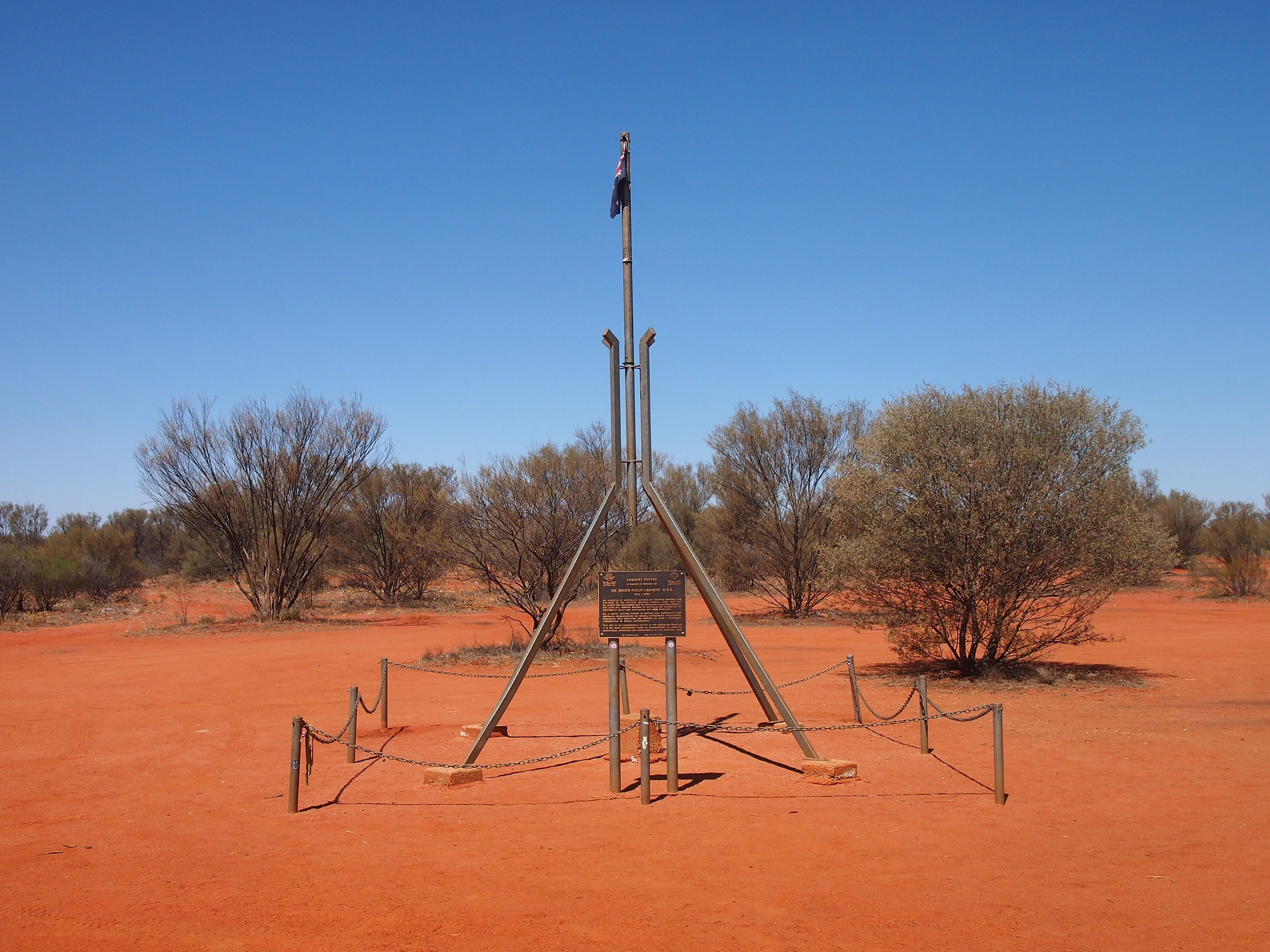
Lambert Centre is marked by a flag pole that mimics that of Parliament House, Canberra.

Centre points of Australia are those geographical locations that have been considered to be centre of Australia, as distinct from the extreme points of Australia.

== Finding the centre point ==
John McDouall Stuart wrote "Sunday, 22 April 1860, Small Gum Creek, under Mount Stuart, Centre of Australia - today I find from my observations of the sun, 111° 00' 30", that I am now camped in the centre of Australia. I have marked a tree and planted the British flag there."

It was Charles Sturt that championed this centre point. He judged this to be running along the longitude of 133° 23′ 45″, the line of longitude which is halfway between Steep Point and Cape Byron. Along this line of longitude (which runs from near Ceduna in South Australia to the base of the Coburg Peninsula in Northern Territory) he judged the halfway point to be the centre of the continent.

Below are five methods which have been used to locate the centre point of Australia:

=== Centre of gravity method ===
23 degrees 7 minutes south latitude, 132 degrees 8 minutes east longitude (23°07′S 132°08′E); position on SF53-13 Hermannsburg 1:250 000 and 5351 Glen Helen 1:100 000 scale maps.

=== Furthest point from the coastline (pole of inaccessibility) ===
23 degrees 2 minutes south latitude, 132 degrees 10 minutes east longitude (23°02′S 132°10′E); position on SF53-13 Hermannsburg 1:250 000 and 5351 Glen Helen 1:100 000 scale maps. There are a few other contenders for this centre, including the tidal centre, which judges the centre from the furthest from the tidal penetration up rivers and streams.

=== Median point ===
There are two ways to judge the median centre point of Australia. The first is the linear centre, which is the halfway points of Australia's extreme points (Cape York, Cape Byron, South Point and Steep Point). The second is the geodetic median point, which is a more accurate method used by surveyors. It uses a box to shape Australia's extreme points and diagonal lines from the corners of the box which cross at the geodetic median centre. Using the second method, the geodetic median point is located due west of Alice Springs, at 23 degrees 33 minutes 9.89 seconds south latitude, 133 degrees 23 minutes 46 seconds east longitude (23°33′9.89″S 133°23′46″E); position on SF53-13 Hermannsburg 1:250 000 and 5551 Amburla 1:100 000 scale maps.

=== Lambert Geographical Centre ===
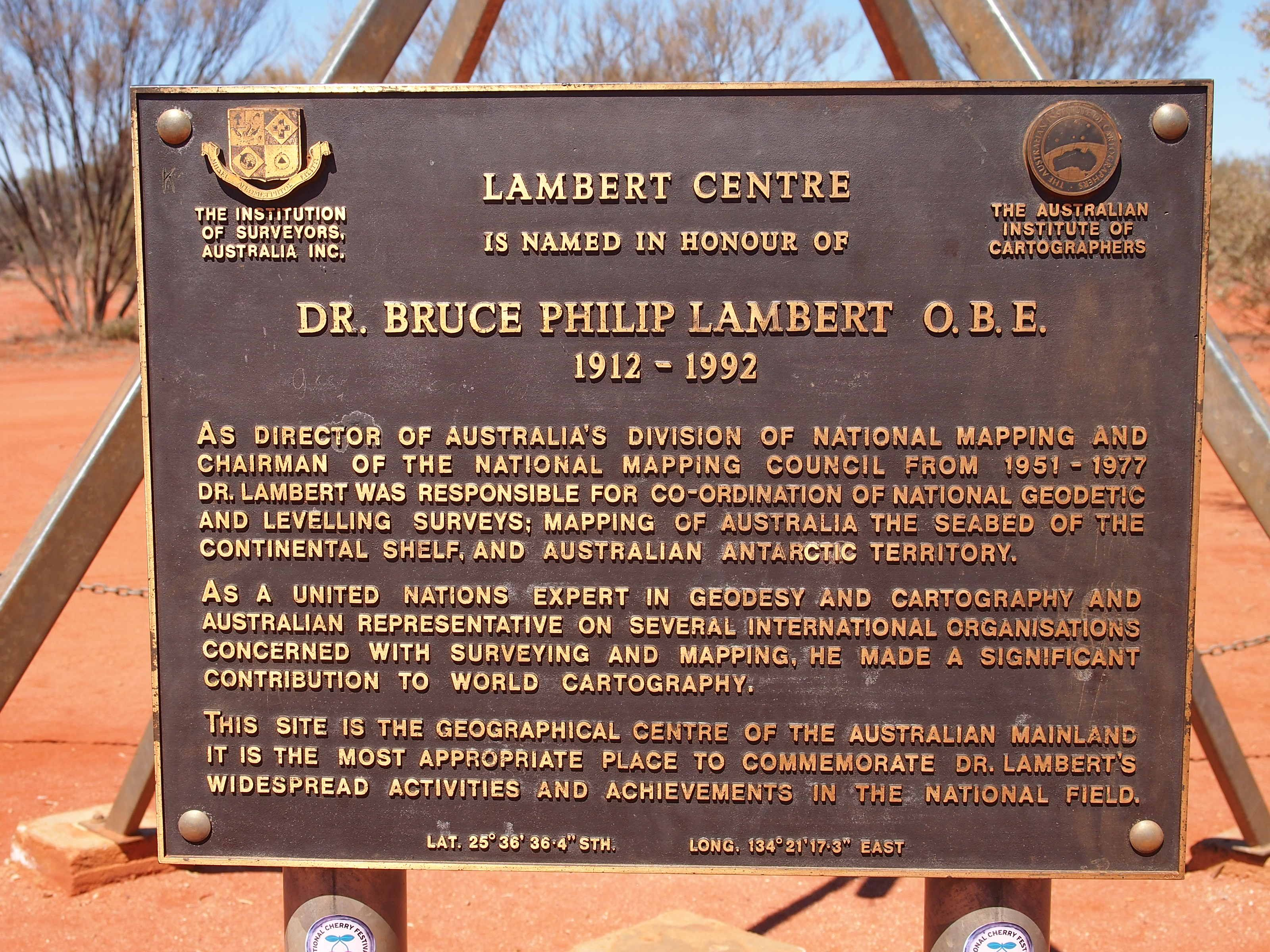
Plaque at the Lambert Centre (note that Lambert died in 1990, not 1992 as written in the plaque)

In 1988, the Royal Geographical Society of Australasia determined the geographical centre of Australia as a Bicentennial project. A monument was erected to mark the location and named in honour of Dr. Bruce Philip Lambert, a former director of the Division of National Mapping, for his achievements in the national survey, levelling and mapping of the continent. The plaque contains an error, as Lambert died in 1990, not 1992. Similar to the centre-of-gravity method, the location was calculated from 24,500 points at the high-water mark of Australia's coastline. The computed result of the 1988 project was 25 degrees 36 minutes 36.4 seconds south latitude, 134 degrees 21 minutes 17.3 seconds east longitude (25°36′36.4″S 134°21′17.3″E); position on SG53-06 Finke 1:250 000 and 5746 Beddome 1:100 000 scale maps.

Dr Cecil Madigan studied Central Australian geology in the 1930s. He calculated the centre of gravity by using a metal cut-out of Australia with a plumb bob and string, and selected a point less than 11 kilometres due west of the present position.

=== Johnston Geodetic Station ===
This trigonometric survey cairn, situated about 1 kilometre (0.62 mi) north of Mount Cavanagh Homestead, was built by officers of the Division of National Mapping in 1965, and was once the central reference point for all Australian surveys. It was named after Fredrick Marshall Johnston, former Commonwealth Surveyor General and the first Director of National Mapping. Today, surveys are based on the Geocentric Datum of Australia (GDA), a new and more accurate Australian coordinate system which has replaced the Australian Geodetic Datum (AGD) of which the Johnston station is a major part. Further information on datum types and their applications is available from the geodesy pages, or from the Inter-governmental Committee on Surveying & Mapping (ICSM).

This point is at 25 degrees 56 minutes 49.3 seconds south latitude, 133 degrees 12 minutes 34.7 seconds east longitude (25°56′49.3″S 133°12′34.7″E) position on SG53-05 Kulgera 1:250 000 and 5546 Kulgera 1:100 000 scale maps.

== Centre of population ==
Australia's centre of population in June 2016 was approximately 35 kilometres (22 mi) east of the town of Ivanhoe in western New South Wales. Australia has not seen its population centroid move drastically since the creation of the country. In 1911, the centroid was in central New South Wales; in 1996, it was only slightly further northwest.

== Centre of the Australian states ==
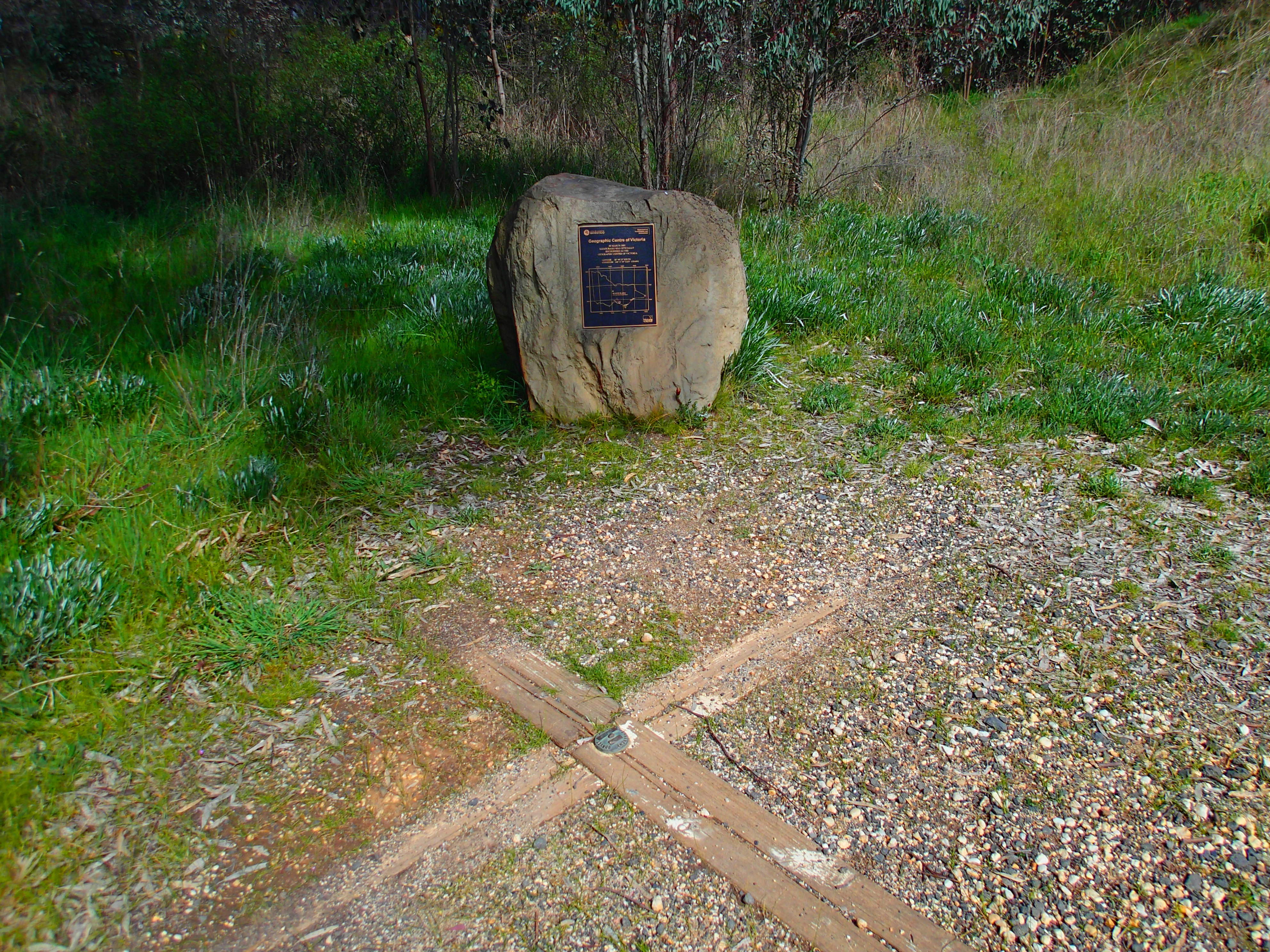
Marker for the geographic centre of the state of Victoria

Just as there are various ways to calculate the centre of Australia as a whole there are various methods of calculating the centre of the states. However, the Government body responsible for determining such matters, Geoscience Australia, has adopted the following locations as the official centroid for each of the States:

- The Geographic Centre of New South Wales centre is located just off Cockies Road, 33 km west-north-west of Tottenham 110 km west of Dubbo. (32° 09' 48" south, 147° 01' 00" east)
- The Geographical Centre of Queensland, is located 17 km north-west of Muttaburra. (22° 29' 13" South, 144° 25' 54" East)
- The Geographic Centre of South Australia is 12 km north-east of the Mount Eba cattle station south-west of Lake Eyre. (30° 03' 30" South, 135° 45' 48" East)
- The Geographic Centre of Tasmania is found on the western shore of Little Pine Lagoon. (42° 01' 17" South, 146° 35' 36" East)
- The Geographic Centre of Victoria is located around 10 km south-south-east of Bendigo, on the steps of the Mandurang Uniting Church. (36° 51' 15" South, 144° 16' 52" East)
- The Geographic Centre of Western Australia is in the Gascoyne Region. (25° 19' 41" South, 122° 17' 54" East)

== Centre of the Australian Territories ==
The Geographic Centre of the Australian Capital Territory is at the former site of the Honeysuckle Creek Tracking Station. (35° 29' 24" South, 149° 00' 05" East)

The Geographic Centre of the Northern Territory is approximately 91 km west-north-west of Tennant Creek. (19° 23' 00" South, 133° 21' 28" East)

== See also ==
- Central Australia – about the Northern Territory Government region rather than the geographical point
- Central Australia (territory) – former territory of Australia
- List of extreme points of Australia
