= List of extreme points of Australia =

Farthest, highest and miscellaneous points of the Oceanian country

Extreme points of mainland Australia

This is a list of the extreme points of Australia (the country, not the continent). The list includes extremes of cardinal direction, elevation, and other points of peculiar geographic interest. The location of some points depend on whether islands and the Australian Antarctic Territory (which is not universally recognised) are included.

== Northernmost point ==
- Bramble Cay, Torres Strait Islands, Queensland (9°8'23" S)
- Continental Australia: Cape York, Cape York Peninsula, Queensland (10°41' S)

== Southernmost point ==
- Bishop and Clerk Islets, Tasmania (55°03' S)
- Tasmania main island: South East Cape, (43°38' S)
- Continental Australia: South Point, Wilsons Promontory, Victoria (39°08' S)
- Including Australian Antarctic Territory: South Pole (90° S)

== Easternmost point ==
- Steels Point, Norfolk Island (167°57' E)
- Excluding external territories: Ball's Pyramid, New South Wales (159°15' E)
- Continental Australia: Cape Byron, New South Wales (153°38' E)

== Westernmost point ==
- Meyer Rock, McDonald Islands (72°34' E)
- Excluding external territories: Dirk Hartog Island, Western Australia (112°56' E)
- Continental Australia: Steep Point, Western Australia (113°09' E)
- Including Australian Antarctic Territory: Enderby Land western border (45° E)

== Highest point ==
- Mawson Peak, Heard Island (2,744 metres (9,003 ft))
- Continental Australia: Mount Kosciuszko, New South Wales (2,228 metres (7,310 ft))
- Furthest point from the centre of the earth: Thornton Peak, Queensland (6,377.866 kilometres)
- Tallest Mountain, as measured from ocean floor: Mount Hamilton, Macquarie Island (5,000 + metres)
- Including Australian Antarctic Territory: Dome A (4,093 metres)
- Including Australian Antarctic Territory on rocky terrain: Mount McClintock, (3,490 metres (11,450 ft))

== Lowest natural point ==
- Kati Thanda–Lake Eyre, South Australia (−15 m (−49 ft))
- Including Australian Antarctic Territory: Deep Lake, Vestfold Hills, (−50 m (−164 ft))

== Other points ==
- Planimetric centre of gravity for continental Australia – Lambert Gravitational Centre, Northern Territory (25°36′36.4″S 134°21′17.33″E)
- Furthest point from the coastline – Between Papunya and Lake Lewis, Northern Territory (23°02′S 132°10′E)
- Northwestern point of continental Australia – North West Cape, Western Australia
- Southwestern point of continental Australia – Cape Leeuwin, Western Australia
- Northeastern point of continental Australia – Cape York, Queensland
- Southeastern point – Cape Howe, New South Wales/Victoria

== See also ==
- Centre points of Australia
- Extreme points of Earth
- Extreme points of Oceania
- Pole of inaccessibility § Australia
