= Lake Lewis (Northern Territory) =

Lake in the Northern Territory

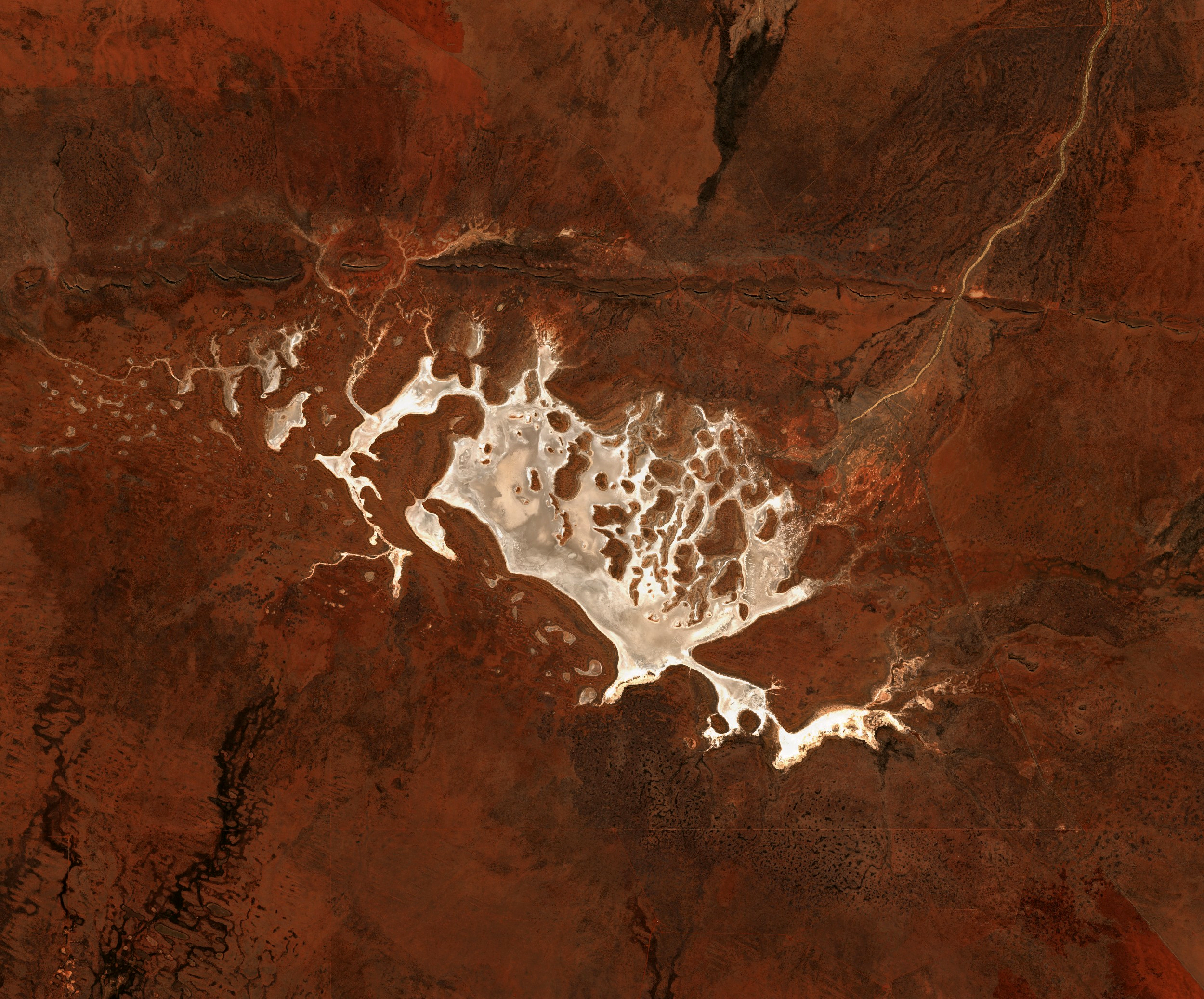
- Sentinel-2 image (2022)

- Location within Northern Territory
- Location: Anmatjere, Northern Territory, Australia
- Coordinates: 22°53′S 132°26′E
- Type: Salt lake
- Etymology: John W. Lewis
- Basin countries: Australia

Lake Lewis is an ephemeral salt lake in the Northern Territory of Australia, in the locality of Anmatjere about 170 kilometres (110 mi) north-west of the town of Alice Springs.

The lake is fed by several nearby creeks; during periods of heavy rain, the lake can grow beyond its usual size and can last as long as six months. The lake system encompasses a number of different terrains, including large areas of saltpans and claypans. Lake Lewis is bounded in the north by Stuart Bluff Range.

The lake was named after John W Lewis, who accompanied P.E. Warburton's expedition in 1873 from the Northern Territory to the Oakover River in Western Australia.

Lake Lewis is also an important site for birds with Black-winged Stilts and Grey Teals, both uncommon species in the Northern Territory, being known to visit the lake.
