= Karrinyarra =

Mountain in Australia

- Central Mount Wedge
- Viewed from the north

Highest point
- Elevation: 1,095 m (3,593 ft)AHD
- Coordinates: 22°51′17″S 131°49′44″E

Geography
- Location within Northern Territory
- Location: Ngalurrtju Aboriginal Land Trust, Australia
- Parent range: Stuart Bluff Range

Karrinyarra, also known as Central Mount Wedge, is a mountain with an elevation of 1,095 metres (3,593 ft) AHD in the southern part of the Northern Territory of Australia. It is the highest peak of the Stuart Bluff Range and was given its English name by the explorer Peter Egerton-Warburton due to its "resemblance to Wedge Island when seen from a distance at sea". Nearby settlements include Papunya, Yuendumu, Mount Liebig, Yuelamu, Laramba and Nyirripi.

Karrinyarra is associated with several Dreamings, and known as a site for collecting bush tobacco.

Notable Australians associated with Karrinyarra include Gwoya Tjungurrayi, Ainslie Roberts and Charles Mountford.

== In popular culture ==
Karrinyarra has featured in works by several artists, including Albert Namatjira and Ainslie Roberts.

== See also ==
- List of mountains of the Northern Territory
