= Stuart Bluff Range =

Mountain range in the Northern Territory, Australia

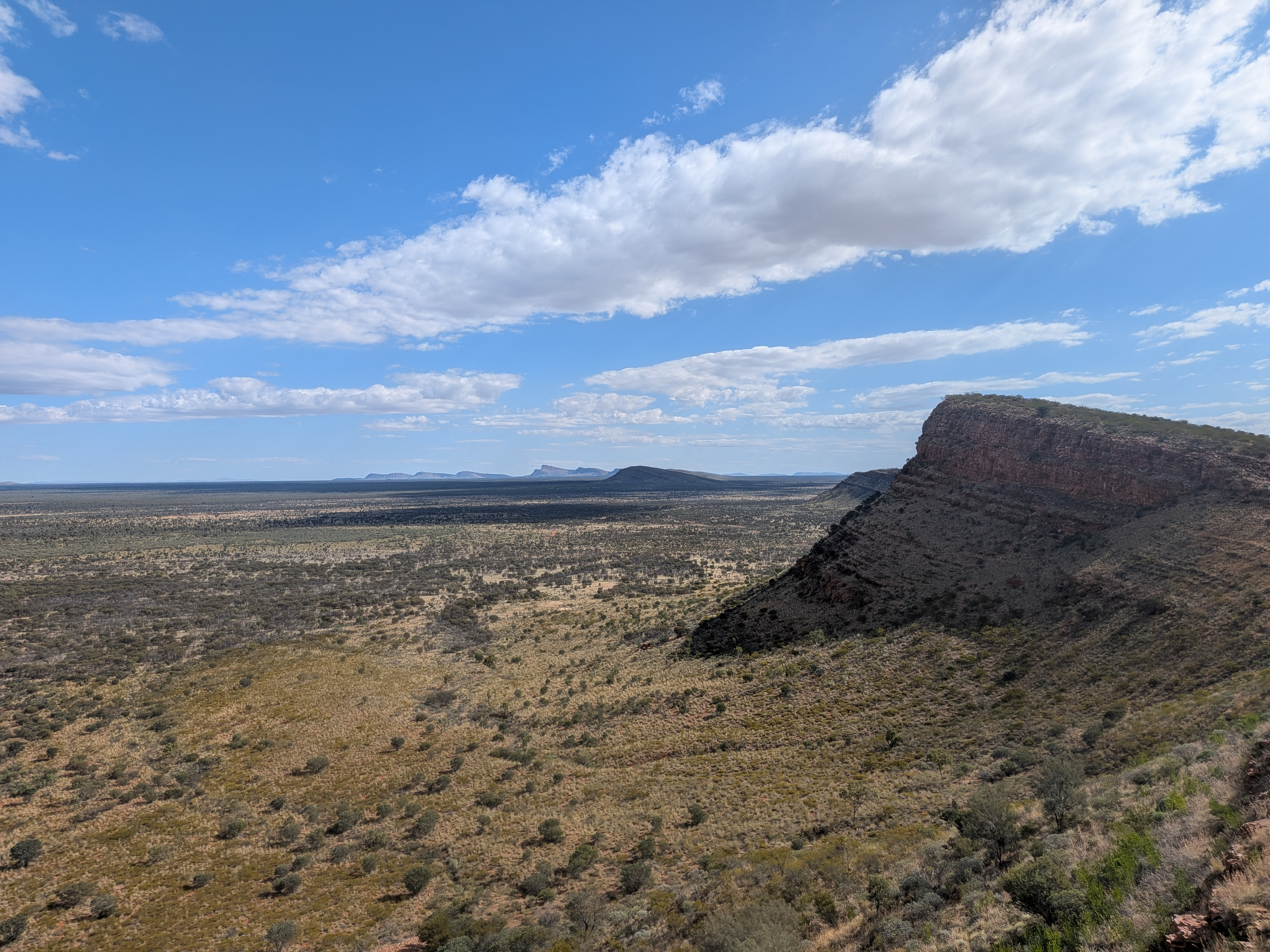

Highest point
- Peak: Karrinyarra
- Elevation: 1,095 m (3,593 ft); AHD
- Coordinates: 22°51′17″S 131°49′44″E

Naming
- Etymology: John McDouall Stuart

Geography
- Location within Northern Territory
- Country: Australia
- Territory: Northern Territory
- Range coordinates: 22°45′46″S 132°06′16″E

The Stuart Bluff Range is a mountain range in the southern Northern Territory.

The first European explorer to sight the range was Peter Egerton-Warburton in May 1873, who named the range Mount Wedge Range. A month later, the explorer William Gosse travelled through the same area, and named the range Stuart Bluff Range, which became recognised as the name of the range due to Gosse publishing his plan of exploration before Warburton published his own plan.

The Stuart Bluff Range provides habitat for the black-footed rock-wallaby.
