= Central Mount Stuart =

Mountain peak in the Northern Territory, Australia

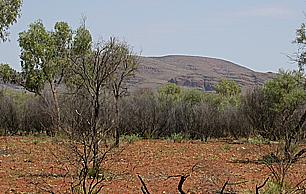
- Central Mount Stuart after rain

Highest point
- Elevation: 846 m (2,776 ft)AHD
- Coordinates: 21°54′22″S 133°27′05″E

Naming
- Etymology: John McDouall Stuart

Geography
- Location within Northern Territory
- Location: Anmatjere, Northern Territory, Australia

Central Mount Stuart is a mountain peak situated in the southern Northern Territory of Australia. It is easily visible from the nearby Stuart Highway. Around it is the Central Mount Stuart Historical Reserve.

== History ==
The mountain peak lies within the traditional lands of the Anmatyerre people.

It is named in honour of Scottish explorer John McDouall Stuart. Stuart reached the area on 22 April 1860 and determined a point approximately 4 km (2.5 mi) south-southwest of the peak to be the centre of Australia, (This assessment is not supported by modern geographers—see centre points of Australia.) He climbed to the top the next day, writing in his journal:

Took Kekwick and the flag, and went to the top of the mount, but found it to be much higher and more difficult of ascent than I anticipated. After a deal of labour, slips, and knocks, we at last arrived on the top. It is quite as high as Mount Serle, if not higher. The view to the north is over a large plain of gums, mulga, and spinifex, with watercourses running through it. The large gum creek that we crossed winds round this hill in a north-east direction; at about ten miles it is joined by another. After joining they take a course more north, and I lost sight of them in the far-distant plain. To the north-north-east is the termination of the hills; to the north-east, east and south-east are broken ranges, and to the north-north-west the ranges on the west side of the plain terminate. To the north-west are broken ranges; and to the west is a very high peak, between which and this place to the south-west are a number of isolated hills. Built a large cone of stones, in the centre of which I placed a pole with the British flag nailed to it. Near the top of the cone I placed a small bottle, in which there is a slip of paper, with our signatures to it, stating by whom it was raised. We then gave three hearty cheers for the flag, the emblem of civil and religious liberty, and may it be a sign to the natives that the dawn of liberty, civilization, and Christianity is about to break upon them. We can see no water from the top. Descended, but did not reach the camp till after dark.

Stuart originally named the peak Central Mount Sturt, after his former expedition leader Charles Sturt. The name was changed (possibly at the instigation of James Chambers) soon after Stuart's return at Adelaide at the end of the expedition, such that Central Mount Stuart is the name that appeared in the published expedition journal.

Stuart's route was followed by the Adelaide-to-Darwin cross-continental Overland Telegraph Line, completed in 1872, and the Central Australia Railway, built between 1878 and 1929. After the telegraph line had been completed and the first messages sent, Sir Charles Todd and surveyor Richard Randall Knuckey returned to Adelaide from Central Mount Stuart.

== Description ==
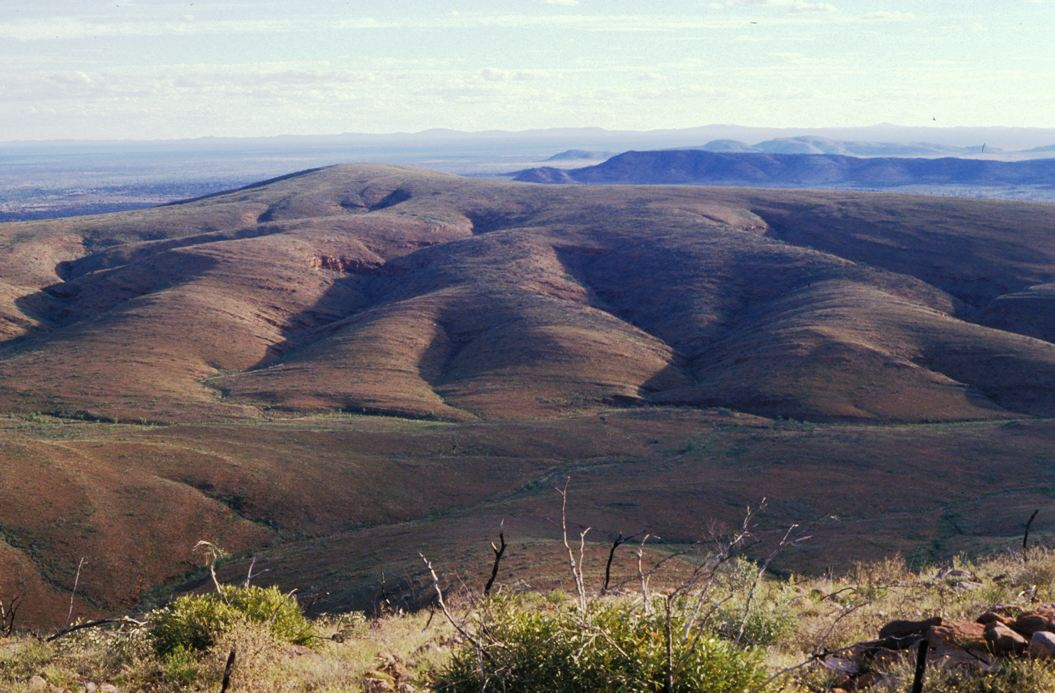
View looking north from the summit of Central Mount Stuart

Central Mount Stuart is a prominent landmark, easily visible from the nearby Stuart Highway, which at closest approach lies about 6 kilometres (3.7 mi) to the southeast. The dark red sandstone that comprise the peak, referred to by geologists as Central Mount Stuart Formation, form part of the Georgina Basin.

Around it is the Central Mount Stuart Historical Reserve.

== See also ==
- List of mountains of the Northern Territory

== Other external resources ==
- Image of Central Mount Stuart on Google Maps
