= William Kekwick =

Australian explorer (1822–1872)

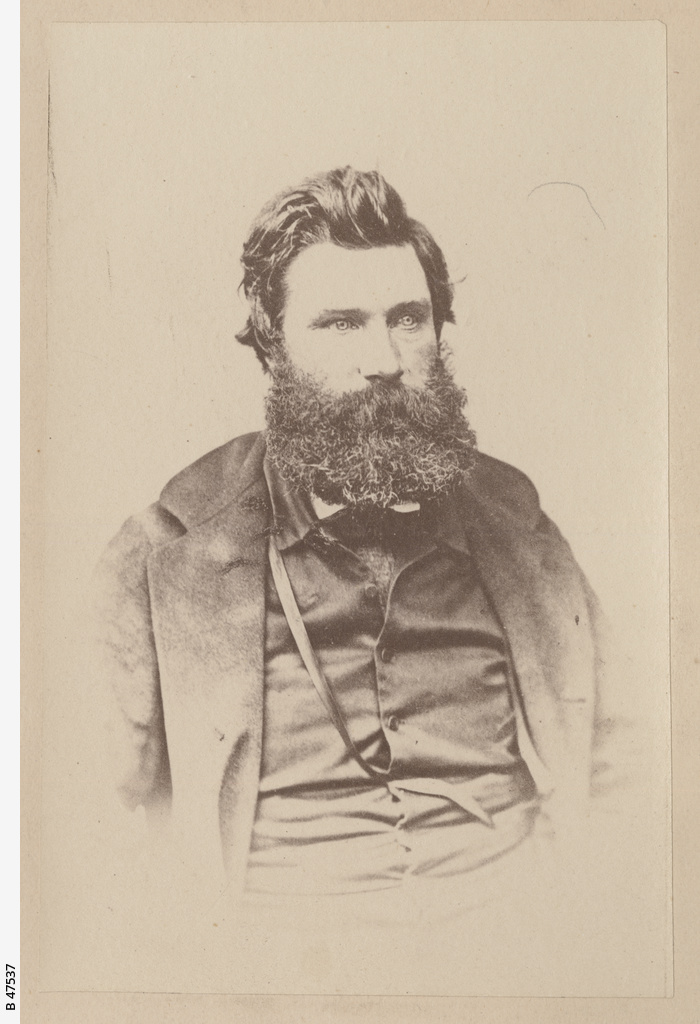
William Darton Kekwick, c1860

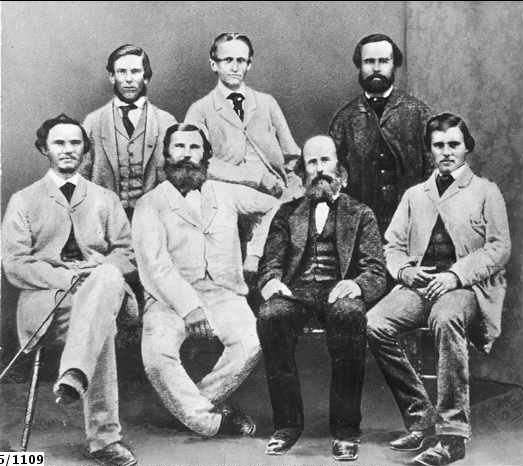
Kekwick second from the left in the front row in a portrait of the Sixth Stuart Expedition, 1861

William Darton Kekwick (3 December 1822 - 16 October 1872) was an explorer in Australia who served as second-in-command to John McDouall Stuart on four of his expeditions trying to reach Darwin from Adelaide; this included the sixth expedition in which they successfully crossed.

== Early life ==
Kekwick was born in East Ham, in Essex, a county of England where he was part of a Quaker family. He went to school at a Quaker school, Ackworth, and in 1840, after completing his education, he immigrated to South Australia with his family, excluding his mother who had died, in 1840. They sailed on Warrior and arrived in April 1840.

After arriving Kekwick first sought to establish a business at Burra but, struggling to find success, decided to travel to the goldfields of Victoria during the gold rush there starting from the early 1850s. He worked alongside his brother Daniel and it was he who introduced him to the pastoralist James Chalmers who, in turn, introduced him to John McDouall Stuart.

== Expeditions with John McDouall Stuart ==
Kekwick began working with Stuart as his second-in-command from 1859 and his first expedition with him is what is considered Stuart's third. On Stuart's forth expedition, Kekwick's second, his influence began to be seen in the numbers of places bearing members of his families names, including Mount Daniel for his brother (Daniel Kekwick) and Mount Beddome for his brother-in-law (Samuel Beddome).

Kekwick was second-in command of the 10 person party when they ultimately crossed Australia and reached Van Diemen Gulf, which is 100 kilometres (62 mi) east of what is today considered Darwin on 24 July 1862.

Stuart would later write of him:

To Mr. Kekwick I am deeply indebted whom I appointed as Second in Command this being the fourth journey he has been out with me and the second as Chief Officer. Whom I have cause to mention in my former journal in the highest terms of commendation which his excellent conduct throughout so fully merited and on this occasion he still retains the same high place in my estimation.

— John McDouall Stuart, via 'John McDouall Stuart' (1958) by Mona Stuart Webster

== Later life ==
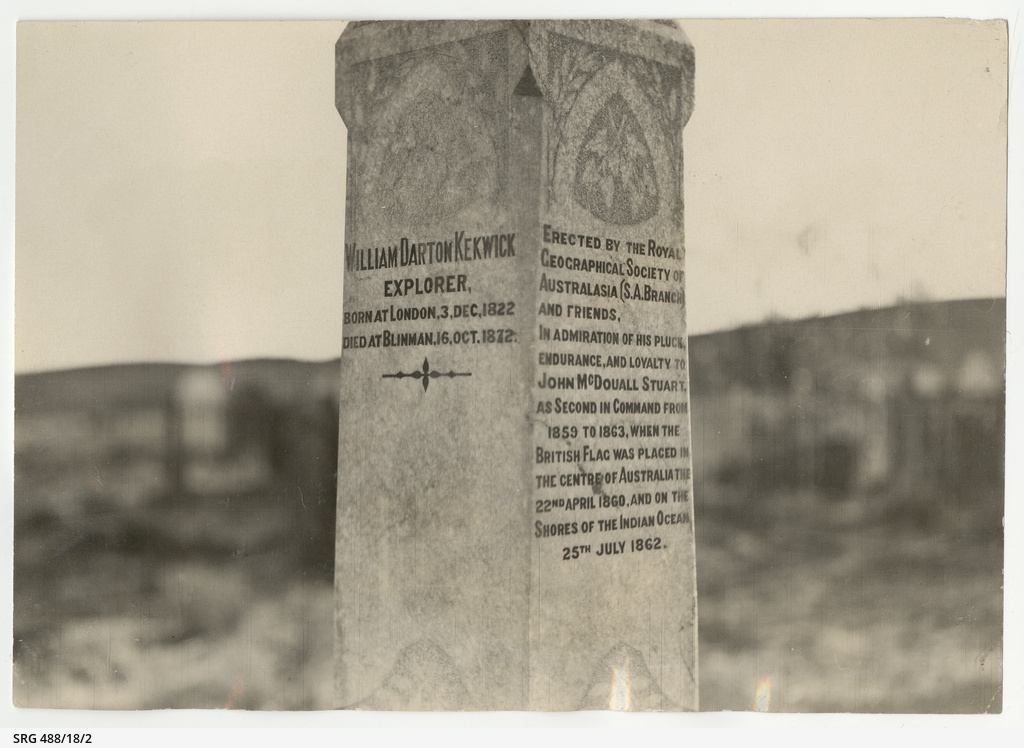
The grave stone of Kekwick as pictured in 1950

After returning to Adelaide in 1863 with the party Kekwick spent some years in Port MacDonnell where, on 23 March 1864, he married Marian Caroline Owen and they would go on to have four children together. In 1871 he returned to Adelaide and sought work building the Overland Telegraph Line but, unsuccessful, he became a miner at Echunga.

In 1872 he was appointed to be third-in-command, and a mineral and botanical collector for William Gosse's expedition to Central Australia, but fell ill with pneumonia before they set out, and died at what are now the Nuccaleena mine ruins, near Moolooloo, while still with the party.

He died 16 October 1873 at Blinman and a grave was erected for him by the Royal Geographical Society of South Australia.

== Legacy ==
The following places are named for Kekwick:

- Kekwick Avenue in Braitling, a suburb of Alice Springs (Mparntwe).
- Kekwick Place in Jabiru.
- Kekwick Ponds in the Barkly Region and it was named by Stuart in recognition of 'the zeal and activity he has displayed during the expedition.'
