= Mandurang =

- Suburb
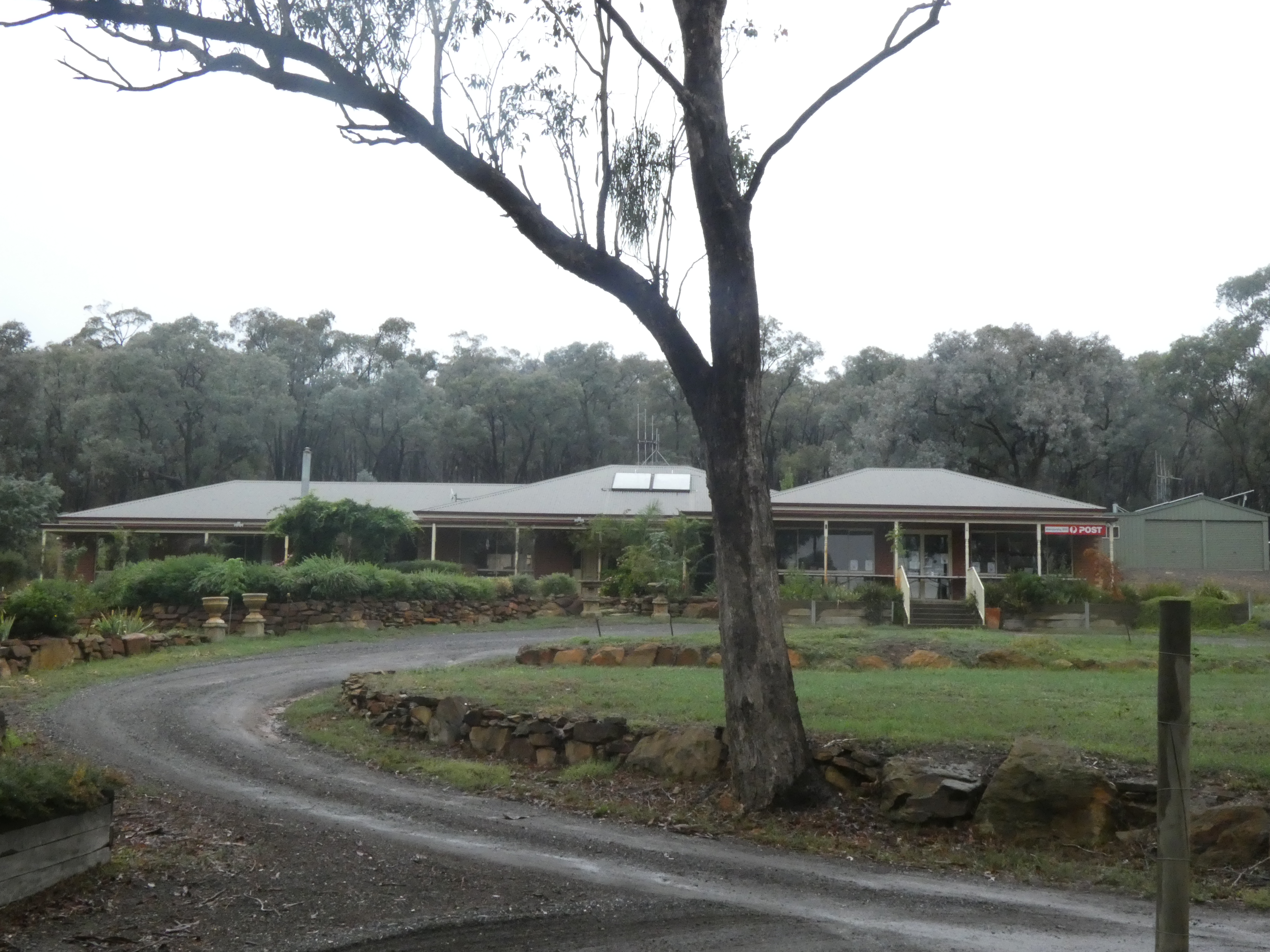
- Mandurang Post Office in March 2022

- Interactive map of Mandurang
- Coordinates: 36°51′15″S 144°16′52″E
- Country: Australia
- State: Victoria
- City: Bendigo
- LGA: City of Greater Bendigo

Government
  - State electorate: Bendigo East
  - Federal division: Bendigo

Population
  - Total: 753 (2021 census)
- Postcode: 3551

Mandurang is a locality in the City of Greater Bendigo, Victoria, Australia. At the 2021 census, Mandurang had a population of 753.

It is located 10 km (6 mi) south of Bendigo and is reputed by the government mapping agency, to be the geographic centre of Victoria at 36° 51' 15"S, 144° 16' 52" E. Parts of the Greater Bendigo National Park are located in Mandurang.

== History ==
It grew and developed as a goldfield settlement and logging locality, though today mostly consists of small farms and wineries. The name is a corruption of the Djadjawurrung word "Munndorong" meaning large black cicada.

Mandurang Primary School was opened in 1877 and closed in 1994.

According to Victorian Municipal Directory 1976:

Post and telephone office, State school, two churches. Overlooked by "One Tree Hill", from which an extensive picturesque view is obtained. Rail to Bendigo, thence 8 km. Postcode 3551.

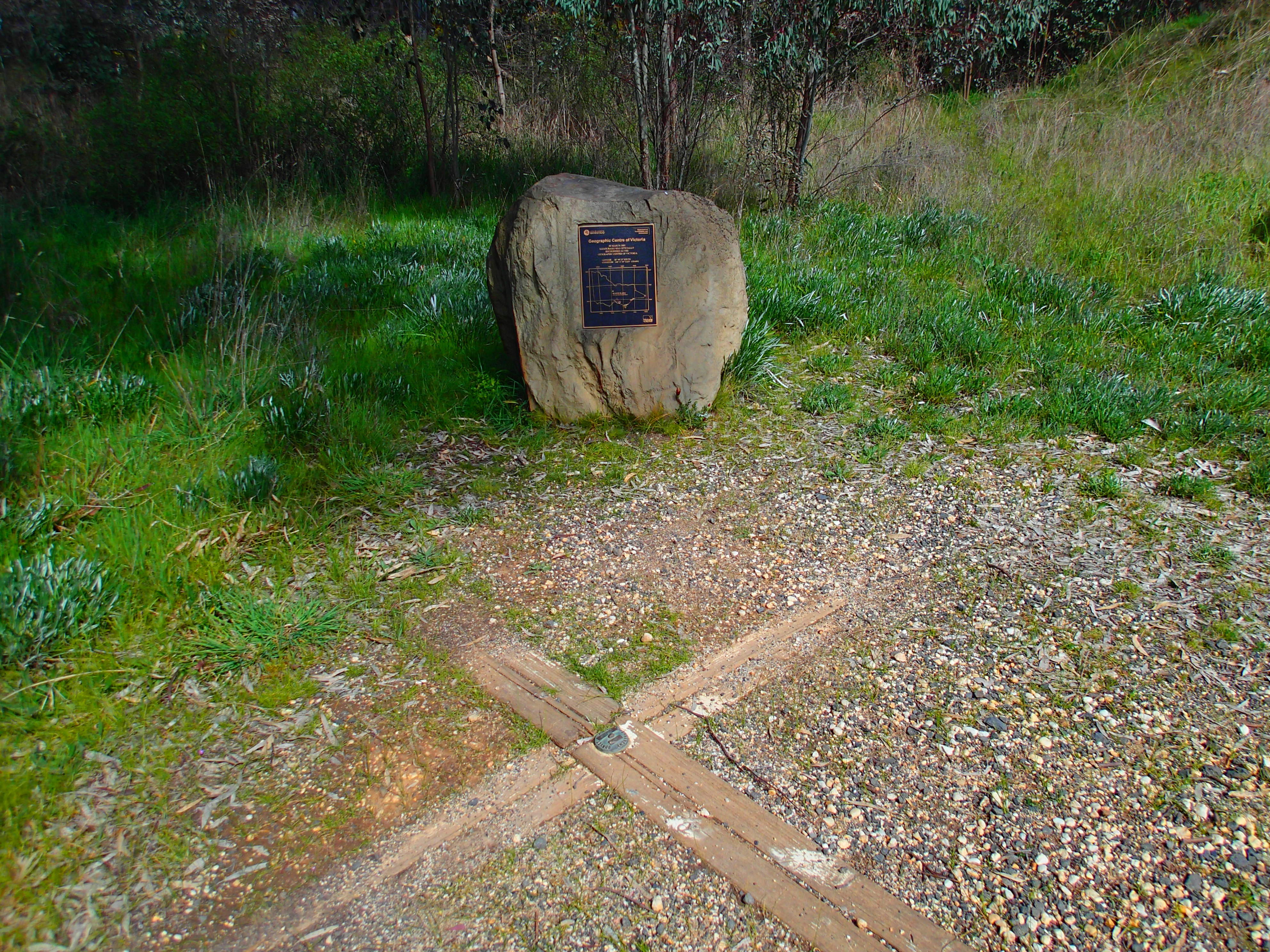
Geographic Centre of Victoria
