= John McDouall Stuart =

Scottish explorer (1815–1866)

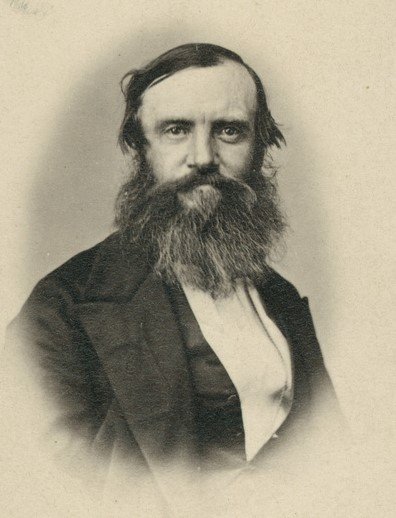
- John McDouall Stuart
- Born: 7 September 1815; Dysart, Fife, Scotland
- Died: 5 June 1866 (aged 50); London, England
- Occupations: Explorer of Australia, surveyor, grazier

John McDouall Stuart (7 September 1815 – 5 June 1866), often referred to as simply "McDouall Stuart", was a Scottish explorer and one of the most accomplished of all Australia's inland explorers.

Stuart led the first successful expedition to traverse the Australian mainland from south to north and return, through the centre of the continent. His experience and the care he showed for his team ensured he never lost a man, despite the harshness of the country he encountered.

The explorations of Stuart eventually resulted in the 1863 annexation of a huge area of country to the Government of South Australia. This area became known as the Northern Territory. In 1911 the Commonwealth of Australia assumed responsibility for that area. In 1871–72 the Australian Overland Telegraph Line was constructed along Stuart's route. The principal road from Port Augusta to Darwin was also established essentially on his route and was in 1942 named the Stuart Highway in his honour, following a recommendation by Governor-General Gowrie.

== Early life ==
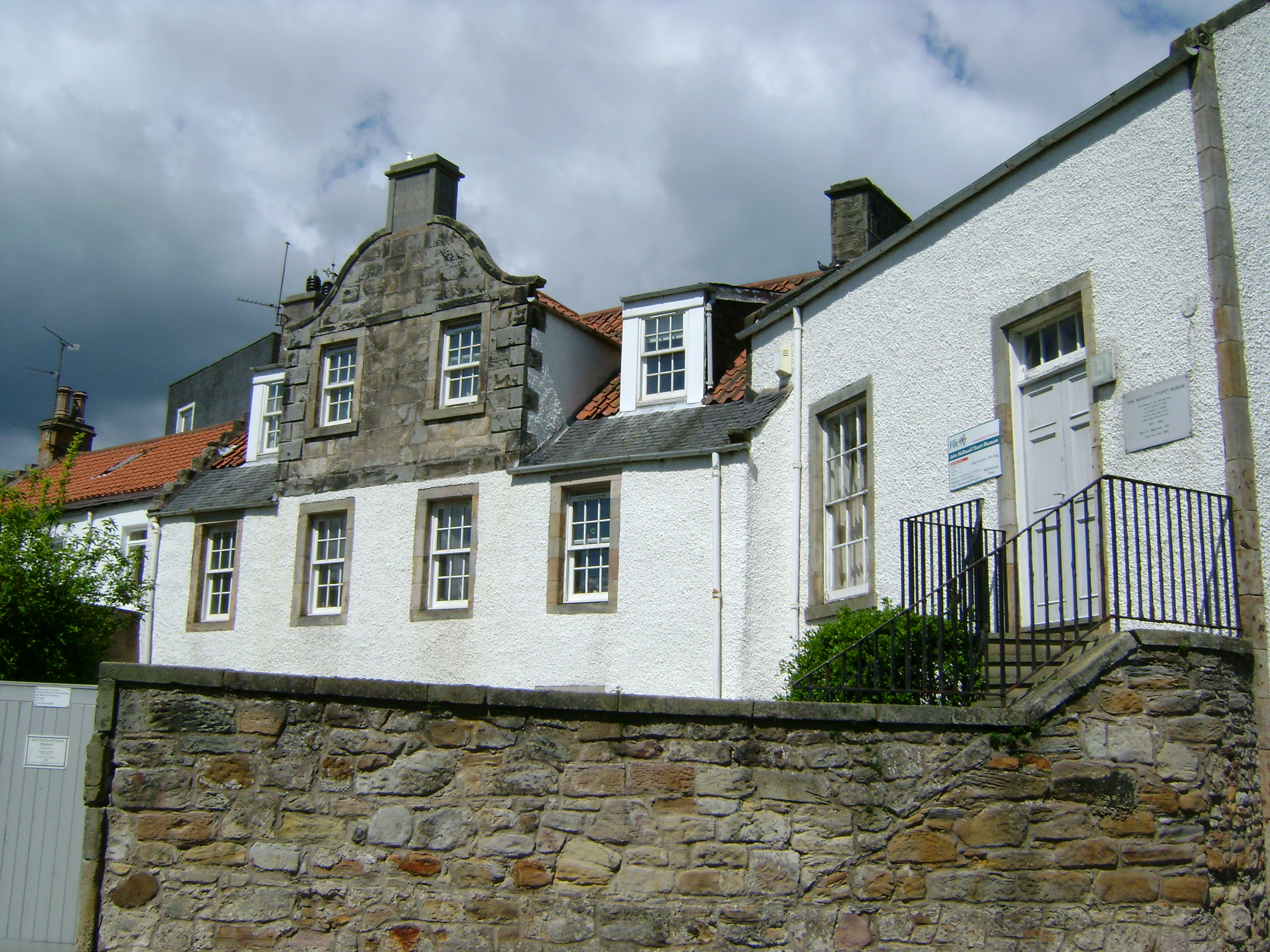
Birthplace of Stuart in Dysart, Scotland

Born in Dysart, Fife, Scotland, Stuart was the youngest of nine children. His father William Stuart was a retired army captain serving as a customs officer. Stuart's parents died in his early teens and so he came under the care of relatives. He graduated from the Scottish Naval and Military Academy as a civil engineer before emigrating to Australia at the age of 23. Stuart was a slight, delicately built young man, standing about 5' 6" tall (168 cm) and weighing less than 9 stone (about 54 kg).

In January 1839 he arrived aboard the barque Indus at the barely two-year-old frontier colony of South Australia, at that time little more than a single crowded outpost of tents and dirt-floored wooden huts. Stuart soon found employment with the colony's Surveyor-General, working in the semi-arid scrub of the newly settled districts marking out blocks for settlers and miners.

== Charles Sturt's protégé ==
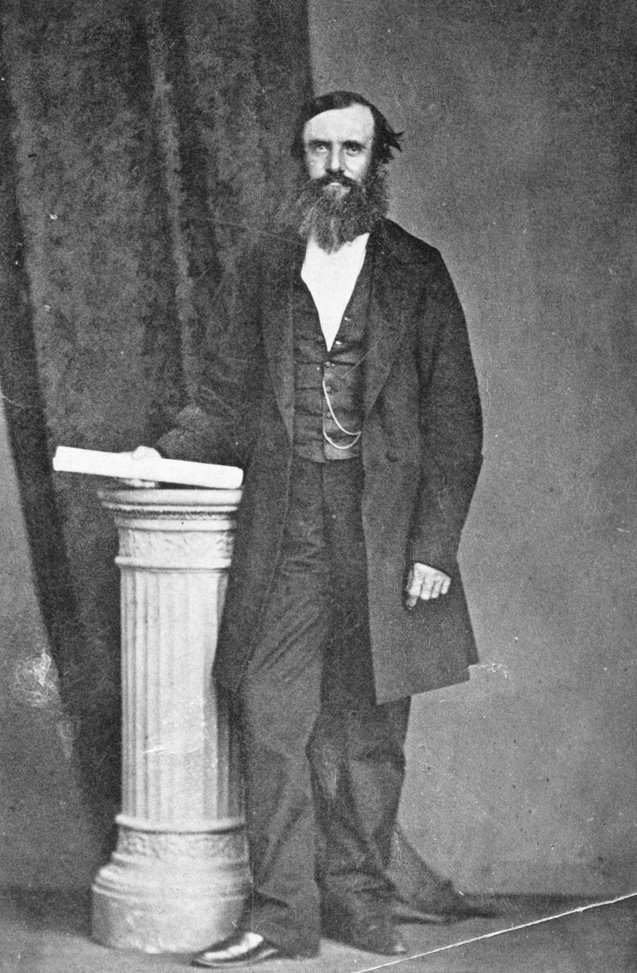
John McDouall Stuart in 1860

The Surveyor General of South Australia, Stuart's superior officer, was the famous explorer Captain Charles Sturt, who had already solved the mystery of the inland-flowing rivers of New South Wales, in the process reaching and naming the Darling River, travelling the full length of the Murrumbidgee, and tracing the Murray to the sea. Stuart remained with the Survey Department until 1842 and then worked in the Mount Lofty Ranges as a private surveyor.

In 1844 Captain Sturt embarked on an expedition into the arid interior, and engaged Stuart as a draughtsman. Sturt's expedition penetrated further north than any previous attempt, at the cost of great hardship. Instead of the hoped-for inland sea, the explorers found two of the most fearsome arid areas anywhere in Australia: Sturt Stony Desert and the Simpson Desert. After his second-in-command James Poole died of scurvy, Sturt appointed Stuart in his place. Both men survived to return to Adelaide, but suffered greatly from scurvy. Sturt never really recovered and soon returned to England; the younger Stuart was unable to work or travel for a year.

Stuart returned to his trade as a private surveyor, spending more and more time in remote areas, and moving to Port Lincoln for several years before moving again to the northern Flinders Ranges where he worked for the wealthy pastoralists William Finke, James Chambers, and John Chambers, exploring, prospecting for minerals, and surveying pastoral leases.

It is claimed that he was a member of Stephen Hack's expedition of May and June 1857 looking for grazing country north and west of Streaky Bay and a private expedition to Lake Gairdner with Anthony Forster (later to become editor of The Register) in 1858.

== First expedition ==
On 14 May 1858, with financial backing from William Finke, Stuart set off on the first of his six major expeditions. His aim was to find minerals, a land which the local Aboriginal people called Wingillpinin, and new grazing land in the north-west of South Australia. Stuart set out from John Chambers' station Oratunga, taking as companions two of Chambers' employees (a white man named Forster and a young Aboriginal man), half a dozen horses, and rations for six weeks, all provided by Chambers, a pocket compass and a watch. From the Flinders Ranges, Stuart travelled west, passing to the south of Lake Torrens, then north along the western edge of Lake Torrens. He found an isolated chain of semi-permanent waterholes which he named Chambers' Creek (now called Stuart Creek). It later became crucially important as a staging post for expeditions to the arid centre of the continent.

Continuing to the north-west, Stuart reached the vicinity of Coober Pedy (not realising that there was a fantastically rich opal field underfoot) before shortage of provisions and lack of feed for the horses forced him to turn towards the sea 500 kilometres to the south. A difficult journey along the edge of the Great Victoria Desert brought Stuart to Miller's Water (near present-day Ceduna) and from there back to civilisation after four months and 2,400 kilometres. This expedition made Stuart's reputation and brought him the award of a gold watch from the Royal Geographical Society.

== Second expedition ==
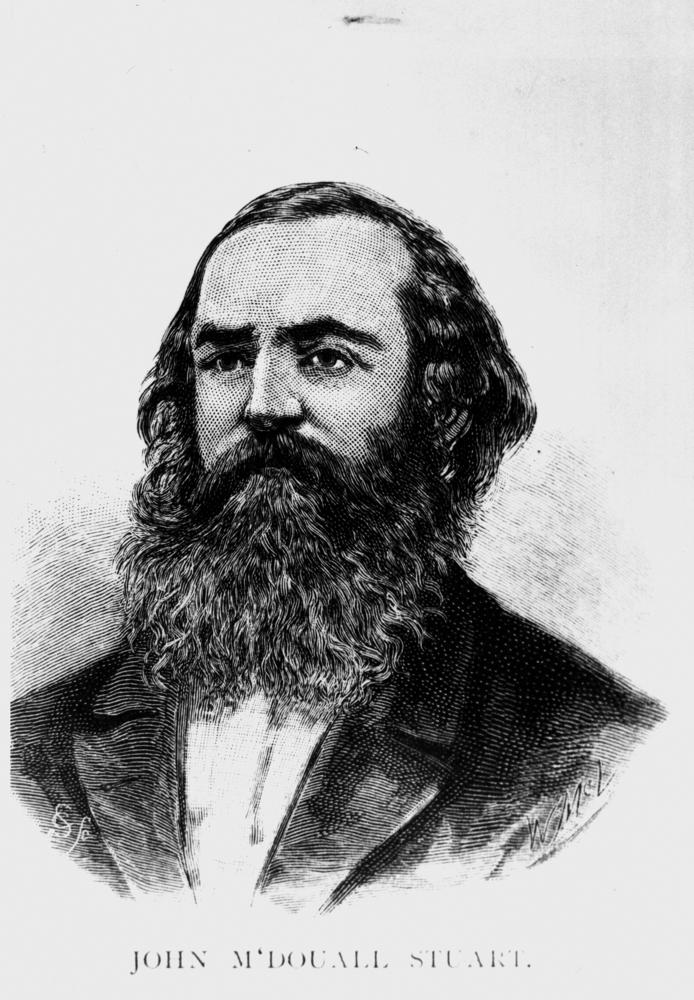

Soon after his return from his first expedition, Stuart applied for a pastoral lease at Chambers Creek. Considered the discoverer, he was already entitled to a lease, but wanted rights to a larger area. As a bargaining chip in the negotiation process, Stuart offered to do the surveying himself and in April 1859 he set off with a party of three men and 15 horses. This gained for him the firm support and confidence of the Governor of South Australia, Richard Graves MacDonnell, himself a keen explorer. The Chambers Creek survey complete, Stuart explored to the north again, aiming to reach the border between South Australia and what is now the Northern Territory (at that time still a part of New South Wales). Although still well supplied with rations and not short of water, the expedition turned back about 100 kilometres short of the border because they had no more horse shoes (an essential item in that arid, stony region). Importantly, however, Stuart had found another reliable water supply for future attempts: a "beautiful spring" fed by the then-unknown Great Artesian Basin. He wrote:

I have named this "The Spring of Hope". It is a little brackish, not from salt, but soda, and runs a good stream of water. I have lived upon far worse water than this: to me it is of the utmost importance, and keeps my retreat open. I can go from here to Adelaide any time of the year and in any sort of season.

He returned in July with reports of "wonderful country"—a description of territory that is now barely able to support a few cattle.

== Third expedition ==
At around this time in Australia, exploration fever was reaching a peak. Several factors contributed. At "home" (as Australians still called Britain), public attention was focussed on the search for the source of the Nile, with the competing expeditions of Speke, Burton and Baker all contending for the honour of discovery. Like the interior of Africa, inland Australia remained an embarrassing blank area on the map and although the long-held dreams of a fertile inland sea had faded, there was an intense desire to see the continent crossed. This was the apex of the age of heroic exploration.

Additionally, there was the factor of the telegraph. Invented only a few decades earlier, the technology had matured rapidly and a global network of undersea and overland cables was taking shape. The line from England had already reached India and plans were being made to extend it to the major population centres of Australia in Victoria and New South Wales. Several of the mainland colonies were competing to host the Australian terminus of the telegraph: Western Australia and New South Wales proposed long undersea cables; South Australia proposed employing the shortest possible undersea cable and bringing the telegraph ashore in Australia's Top End. From there it would run overland for 3,000 kilometres south to Adelaide. The difficulty was obvious: the proposed route was not only remote and (so far as European settlers were concerned) uninhabited, it was simply a vast blank space on the map.

At much the same time, the wealthy rival colony Victoria was preparing the biggest and most lavishly equipped expedition in Australia's history; the Victorian Exploring Expedition, to be led by Robert O'Hara Burke. The South Australian government offered a reward of £2,000 to any person able to cross the continent through the centre and discover a suitable route for the telegraph from Adelaide to the north coast. Stuart's friends and sponsors, James & John Chambers and Finke, asked the government to put up £1,000 to equip an expedition to be led by Stuart. The South Australian government, however, ignored Stuart and instead sponsored an expedition led by Alexander Tolmer, which failed miserably, failing to travel beyond the settled districts.

Meanwhile, Stuart was entangled with other problems. Some of the land he had claimed and surveyed in the Chambers Creek district on his second trip had in fact already been explored and claimed by people attracted to the area by reports of Stuart's first trip. Stuart needed to return to Chambers Creek to re-survey his claims. He left Adelaide with a small party in August 1859. Having surveyed his own claim and several new claims on behalf of his sponsors, Stuart spent the spring and summer exploring the area west of Lake Eyre, finding several more artesian springs. Working through the severe heat of summer, Stuart experienced trouble with his eyes because of the glare, and after some time enduring half rations, all but one of his men refused to leave camp. Contemptuously, Stuart sent them home.

William Kekwick, his remaining companion, was reputed for his steadfastness and would stay with Stuart for the remainder of his career, usually organising the supply bases while Stuart scouted ahead. Kekwick went south for provisions and more men, returning with 13 horses, rations for three months, however only a single man; Benjamin Head.

== Fourth expedition ==
On 2 March 1860 the three men left Chambers Creek, aiming to find the centre of Australia. As always, Stuart travelled light, taking only as much as could be carried on a few pack horses. The secret to successful exploration, in Stuart's view, was to travel fast and avoid the delays and complications that always attend a large supply train.

By the time they reached Neales River (near present-day Oodnadatta) unexpected rain had ruined most of their stores and they continued on half-rations – something that Head, who had started the trip as a big man and weighed twice as much as Stuart, found difficult to adjust to. Water became more and more difficult to find and scurvy began to set in. Stuart's right eye was failing. Nevertheless, they found a major watercourse in early April which Stuart named the Finke River, and followed it north-west over the South Australian border to the MacDonnell Ranges, which he named after Sir Richard Graves MacDonnell, Governor of South Australia, on 12 April 1860.

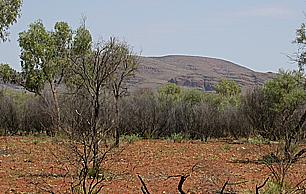
Central Mount Stuart, Australia, after rain

On 22 April 1860, according to Stuart's calculations, the party reached the centre of the continent. Stuart wrote:

There is a high mount about two miles to the NNE which I hoped would be in the centre but on it tomorrow I will raise a cone of stones and plant the Flag there and will name it Mount Sturt after my excellent and esteemed commander of the expedition in 1844 and 45, Captain Sturt, as a mark of gratitude for the great kindness I received from him during that journey.

In fact the mountain became known as Central Mount Stuart after Stuart himself, not his mentor Sturt, and geographers no longer regard it as the true centre of Australia. Nevertheless, it retains its symbolic value.

The explorers were unable to progress much further north. Lack of water forced them back again and again. Stuart's scurvy was growing worse, Head was now half his original weight, and only Kekwick remained capable of heavy work. Then, on 22 May, it rained. With water now available nearly every day, they made good mileage and by mid June were able to reach a riverbed which Stuart named Tennant's Creek (now the site of the township Tennant Creek). The worst of the country was now behind them and they were only about 800 km from the coast.

From here, however, progress seemed impossible. A four-day excursion to the north-west found no water at all and they had to retreat. After giving the horses a week to recover, they tried heading due north. They found another creek (later named Attack Creek) but were blocked by heavy scrub. Unlike those further south, the Warramunga Aboriginal people defended their country from trespassers. On 26 June they raided the explorers' camp. One stole the shoeing rasp (which Stuart was able to recover); others threw boomerangs at the horses and set fire to the grass around the camp. Like Sturt (and unlike some of the other Australian explorers) Stuart generally got on well with the Aboriginal people he encountered but he was unable to negotiate with this group and considered it unsafe to continue. That night, with even the indefatigable Kekwick complaining of weakness, the explorers abandoned their attempt to reach the north coast and reluctantly turned south.

It was 2,400 kilometres to Adelaide, all three men had scurvy, supplies were very short, the horses were in poor condition, and the country was drying out. Nevertheless, the party pressed on at Stuart's customary rapid pace. They reached the safety of Chambers Creek in August. A few days earlier, on 20 August 1860, the larger Burke and Wills expedition had finally left Melbourne.

Stuart reached Adelaide in October 1860. Although he had narrowly failed to cross the continent, his achievement in determining the centre was immense, ranked with John Hanning Speke's discovery of the source of the Nile. Stuart had solved that which he attempted with Capt. Sturt 15 years earlier – the riddle of the nature of the centre of the great Australian continent. He was awarded the Royal Geographical Society's Patron's Medal – becoming only the second person to receive both the Patron's Medal and a gold watch (the other was Dr Livingstone). Belatedly, even the South Australian government started to recognise Stuart's abilities, and was honoured with a public breakfast at White's Rooms in Adelaide.

== Fifth expedition ==
James Chambers put forward a plan for Stuart and Kekwick to return north with a government-provided armed guard to see them past the difficulties at Attack Creek. The government prevaricated and quibbled about cost, personnel, and ultimate control of the expedition, but eventually agreed to contribute ten armed men and £2,500; and put Stuart in operational command. (In contrast, the Burke and Wills expedition had cost £9,000 to establish. That expedition had already reached the Darling River in northern New South Wales.)

Stuart left Chambers Creek with a dozen men, 49 horses and rations for 30 weeks on 1 January 1861. It was high summer in South Australia and the worst possible time for travelling. Stuart was soon forced to send two men and the five weakest horses back. The heat was extreme and the party often delayed while Stuart searched for fodder and water. They were still in northern South Australia on 11 February, the day that Burke and Wills reached the Gulf of Carpentaria. With difficulty, Stuart's party had reached the MacDonnell Ranges when heavy rains came, allowing them to press on northwards at a much better pace. They reached Attack Creek on 24 April 1861, this time finding no sign of the hostile tribesmen that had blocked the last attempt. At about the same time – and unknown to Stuart's party, of course – Burke, Wills and King reached their base camp at Cooper Creek only to find it deserted. The fourth member of their party, Charles Gray, was already dead; Wills and then Burke perished within a few more days, leaving only King to be sustained by the kindness of the local Aboriginal people.

Stuart still planned to march north-west towards the known region of Victoria River, which had been mapped by Augustus Charles Gregory in 1858. Leaving the main expedition to rest, he led a series of small parties in that direction, but was blocked by thick scrub and a complete lack of water. After a great deal of effort, the scouting parties managed to find another watering point 80 kilometres (50 mi) further north and Stuart moved the main body up. Over the next two weeks Stuart made three more attempts to find a practicable route over the plains to the north-west, but without success. Finally, he decided to try heading due north. He was rewarded with the discovery of "a splendid sheet of water" 150 metres (492 ft) wide and 7 kilometres (4 mi) long which he named "Newcastle Water, after his Grace the Duke of Newcastle, Secretary for the Colonies".

For five more weeks the party camped at Newcastle Waters while Stuart tried to find a north-westward route to take them to Victoria River and thus the sea. The local Aboriginal people were wary of trespassers on their land, lighting fires around the camp and spooking the horses, and Kekwick had to mount an armed sentry with instructions to fire warning shots whenever they came near. Provisions were running short and both men and horses were in poor condition. Finally, on 1 July 1861, exactly six months after they had left Chambers Creek, Stuart ordered a return. In the relative cool of the southern winter, they travelled fast, reaching the settled regions of South Australia in September.

When Stuart learned that Burke and Wills were missing he immediately offered to join the search for them. The first rescue teams had left some time earlier, however, and soon returned with the news that no less than 7 members of the largest and best-equipped expedition in Australia's history had died.

Public exploration mania had cooled considerably. Although Stuart had now led five expeditions into the arid centre of Australia and crossed all but the last few hundred miles of the continent without losing a man, the South Australian government was initially reluctant to back a sixth effort. However, the prospect of establishing a route for an overland telegraph line became a significant factor. The government finally provided £2,000 at the last minute on condition that Stuart took a scientist with him. James & John Chambers along with William Finke remained the principal private backers.

== Sixth expedition (Crossing of Australia) ==
Stuart's sixth expedition was officially launched at James Chambers' home at North Adelaide on 23 October 1861. Their first stop, before they had reached the town of Gawler, was forced by trouble with their horses. One reared, striking Stuart's temple with its hoof, rendering him unconscious then trampling his right hand, dislocating two joints and tearing flesh and nail from the first finger. At first it was feared amputation would be necessary, but Stuart and Waterhouse (the naturalist, appointed by the Government) were able to catch up with the rest of the party at Moolooloo (one of the Chambers brothers' stations) five weeks later. However they did not leave Chambers Creek until 8 January 1862. One of the party, John W. Woodforde, son of the City Coroner, was dismissed by Stuart for insubordination, having refused to be parted with his greatcoat, and, contrary to Stuart's instructions, for keeping a personal diary. The party comprised 10 men and 71 horses. Benjamin Head, veteran of the fourth expedition, was still too ill to accompany them. The party made good time to Newcastle Waters, reaching that point on 5 April, and experiencing conflict with the local Aboriginal people once again. Here they rested for a week before Stuart led a scouting party north, finding good water for the main body to move up to. The next stage, however, proved more difficult. Five times Stuart and his scouts tried to find a route towards Victoria River without success. Finally he headed north rather than north-west and was rewarded with a series of small waterholes leading to Daly Waters, about 150 kilometres north of Newcastle Waters.

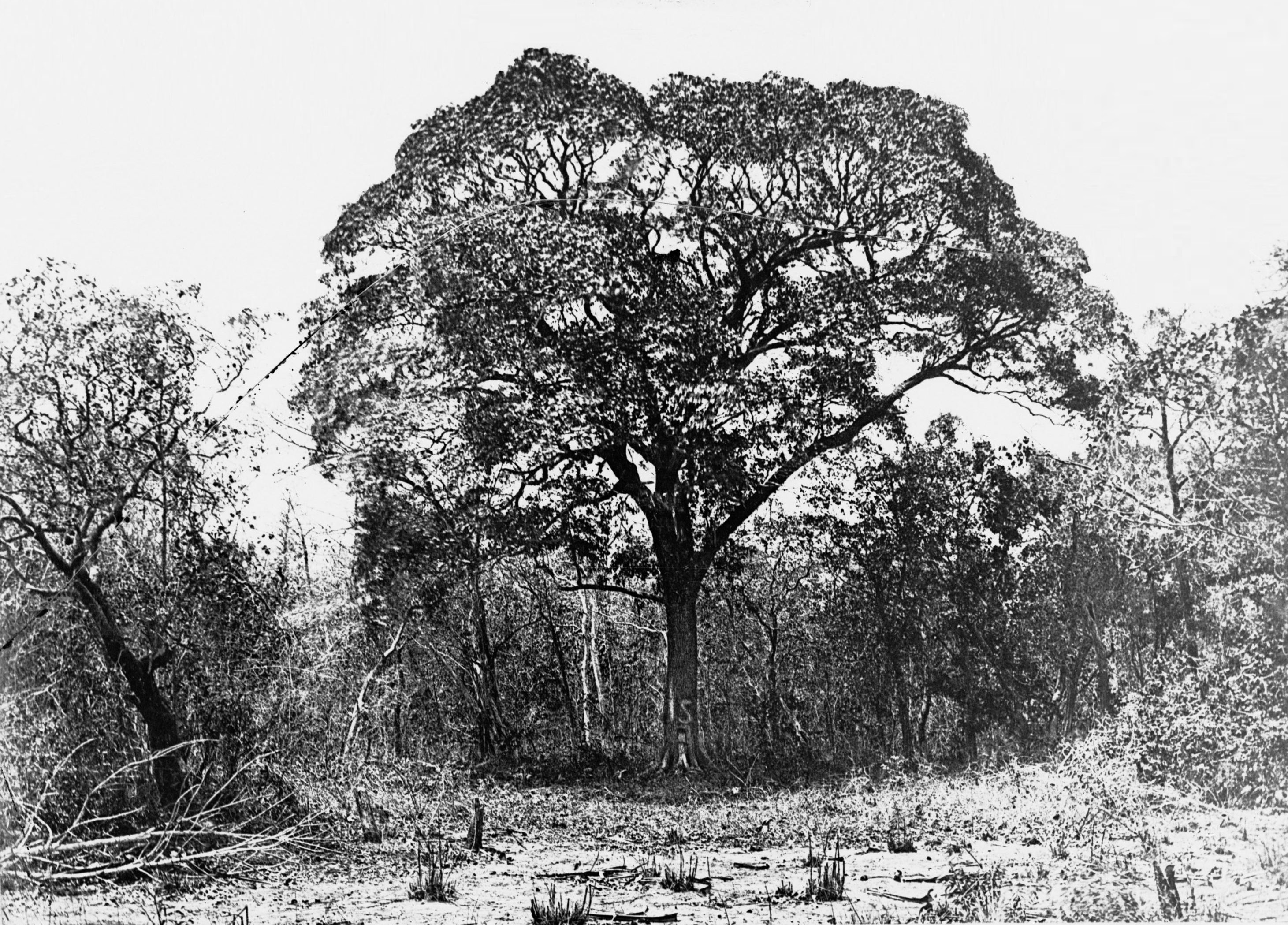
Stuart's marked tree at Stuart Point

Stuart made one last attempt to reach Victoria River before continuing north into the Top End. On 9 June he reached territory that had already been mapped and on 1 July the Mary River, which hadn't, presuming it to be the Adelaide River (without a chronometer, determination of longitude was impossible). On 24 July 1862 the expedition reached a muddy beach on Van Diemen Gulf, 100 km east of today's Darwin, and there marked a tree "JMDS" and named a nearby watercourse "Thrings Creek". He and his companions had crossed the continent from south to north. The following day Stuart found a sizable tree which he marked with an "S" and there raised the Union Jack presented to him by Elizabeth Chambers, and named the long stretch of beach which lay to the west, Chambers Bay in her honour.

Members of Stuart's 1861–1862 expedition party

The ten successful members of the party are listed here with their age on the day of the expedition's departure from North Adelaide.

| | | | Born | Died | Grave | Notes |
|---|---|---|---|---|---|---|
| John William Billiatt | | 19 years, 1 month | 1842 | 1919 (aged 76–77) | Devon, England | Married King's sister |
| Stephen King Jr | | 19 years, 10 months | 1841 | 1915 (aged 73–74) | Nailsworth, Adelaide | |
| James Frew Jr | | 21 years, 4 days | 1840 | 1877 (aged 36–37) | West Tce, Adelaide | |
| William Patrick Auld | Assistant | 21 years, 5 months | 1840 | 1912 (aged 71–72) | West Tce, Adelaide | |
| John McGorrery | Shoeing Smith | 21 years, 9 months | 1840 | 1914 (aged 73–74) | West Tce, Adelaide | Died at Parkside Asylum. |
| Heath Nash | | 23 years, 1 month | 1838 | 1913 (aged 74–75) | Payneham, Adelaide | |
| Francis William Thring | Third Officer | 24 years, 5 months | 1837 | 1908 (aged 70–71) | West Tce, Adelaide | |
| William Darton Kekwick | Second in Command | 38 years, 10 months | 1822 | 1872 (aged 49–50) | Blinman, South Australia | |
| John McDouall Stuart | Commander | 46 years, 1 month | 1815 | 1866 (aged 50–51) | Kensal Green, London | |
| Frederick George Waterhouse | Naturalist | 46 years, 2 months | 1815 | 1898 (aged 82–83) | Magill, South Australia | |

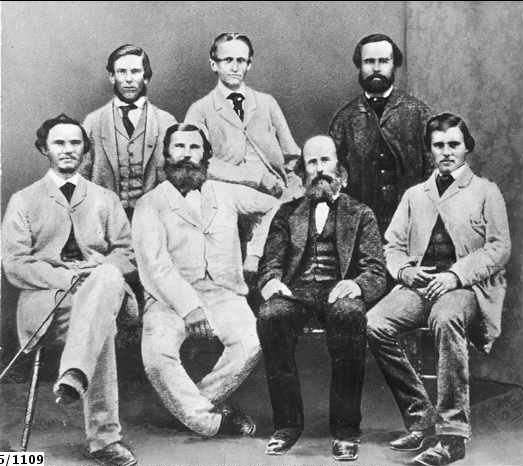
1861 Auld Billiatt Thring Frew Kekwick Waterhouse King absent: Stuart Nash McGorrery

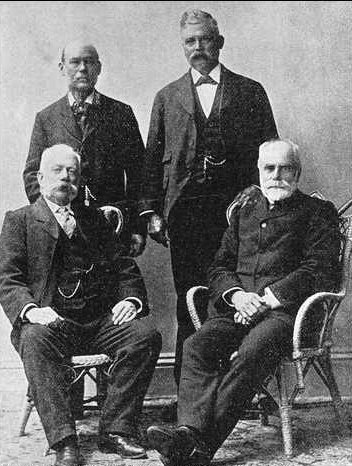
1900 Nash King Auld Thring

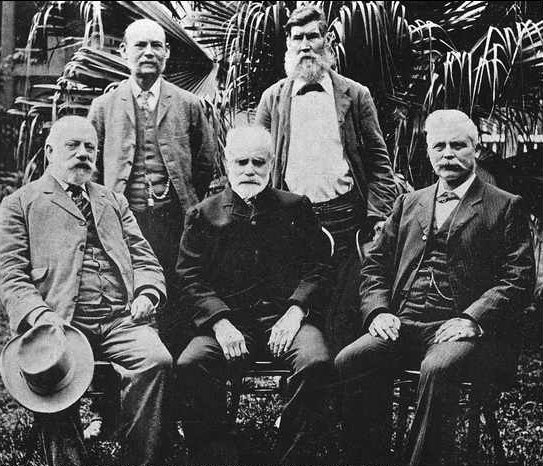
1904 Nash McGorrery Auld Thring King

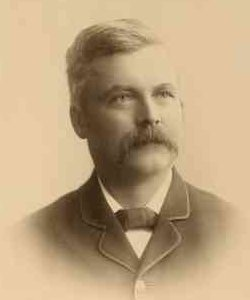
Stephen King Jr c. 1880

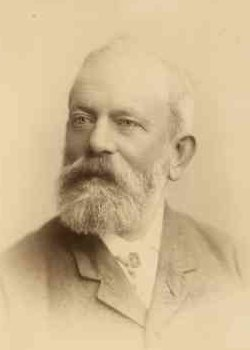
W. P. Auld c. 1890

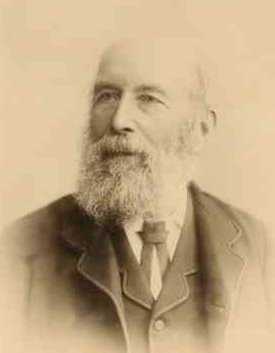
F. G. Waterhouse c. 1890

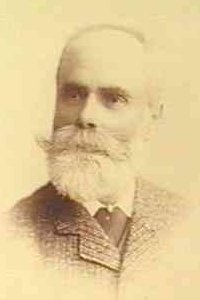
F. W. Thring c. 1890

== Character and last days ==
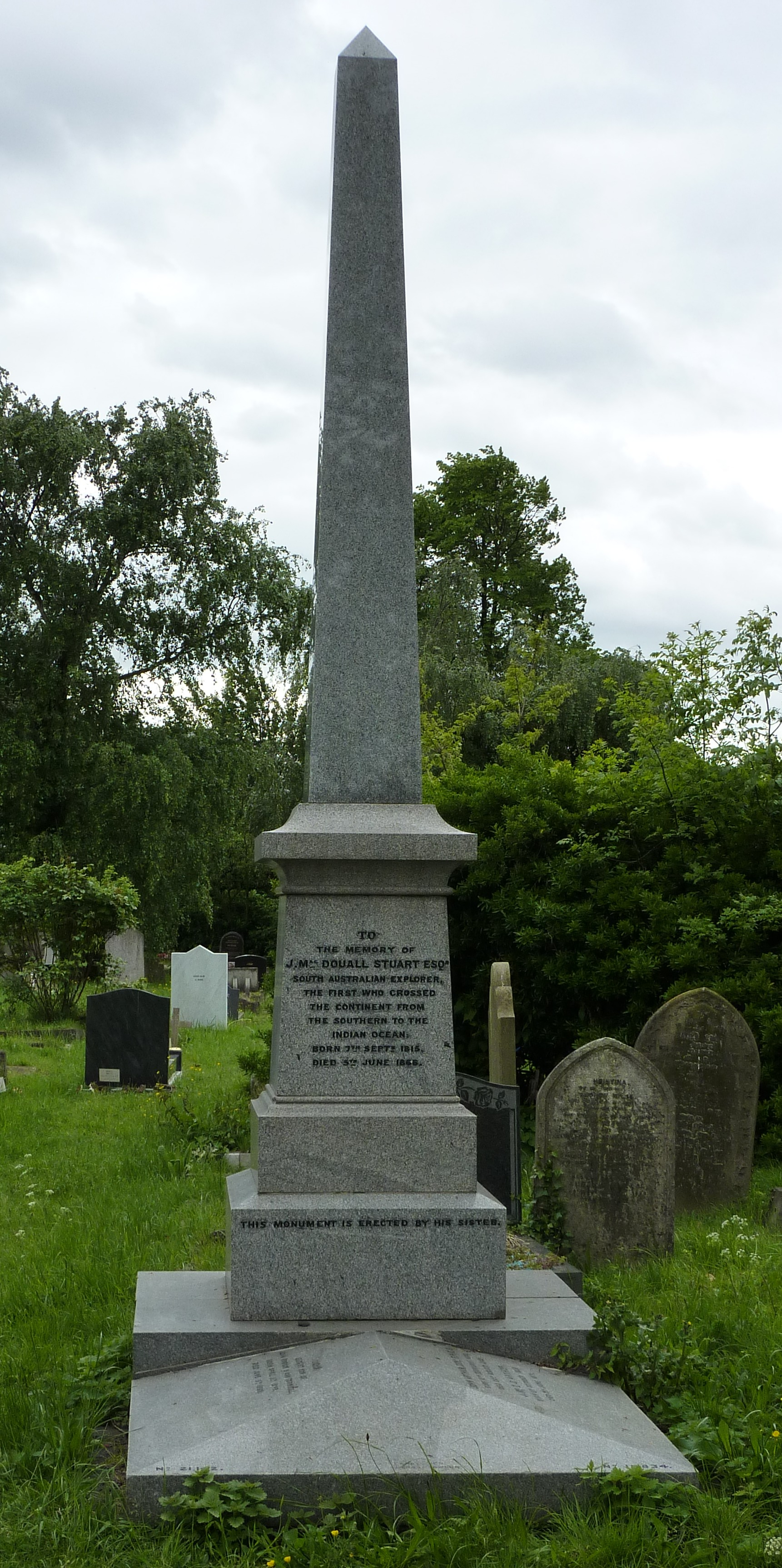
Stuart's funerary monument at Kensal Green Cemetery, London in 2014

By current standards Stuart was physically a small, wiry man, but in fact he was of average build of western European men at that time. He had a full dark beard and sometimes wore moleskin trousers and an unfashionable long-tailed blue coat with brass buttons and cabbage-tree hat. He was able to endure privations and possessed a fierce determination which overrode any thought of personal comfort. He was not particularly gregarious; he had some good friends but seemed happiest away from crowds. He was a Freemason, being initiated in the Lodge of Truth, Adelaide, No. 649 on 1 August 1859, and retained membership until shortly before he returned to England. Another reference has him being inducted into the Lodge of Truth, North Adelaide, No. 933, on 5 April 1860.

Many years of hard conditions combined with malnutrition, scurvy, trachoma and other illnesses had rendered him practically blind, in pain and in such poor health that he spent some (900 km) of the return journey of his last expedition (1861–1862) being carried on a litter between two horses. He never recovered his health. He prepared his diaries for publication and on 23 April 1864 left aboard Indus for Britain, initially to visit his sister in Scotland. He died in London two years later, and was buried at Kensal Green Cemetery.

== Recognition ==
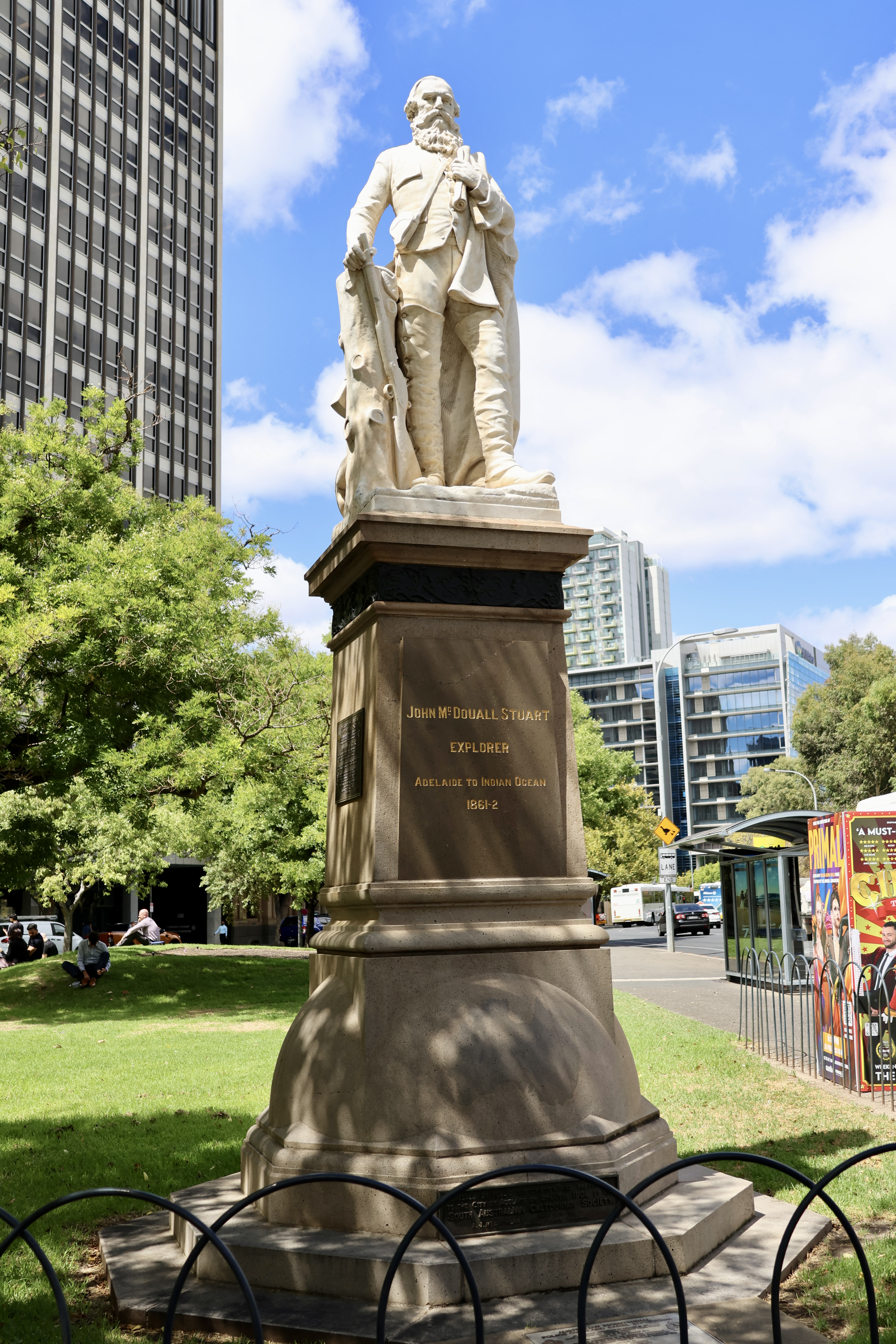
Statue of Stuart in Victoria Square in the Adelaide city centre

While Stuart was responsible for naming a large number of topographical features for friends, backers and fellow explorers, he was sparing in the use of his own name. Central Mount Stuart, which he reckoned to be the geographical centre of Australia, he had designated "Central Mount Sturt" to honour his friend Charles Sturt. Places named after Stuart include:

- McDouall Peak, a hill in South Australia
- Stuart Street, an arterial road in the Canberra suburb of Griffith
- the Stuart Highway,
- Stuart Park, an inner Darwin suburb,
- Central Mount Stuart,
- Stuart Creek in the far north of South Australia,
- McDouall Stuart Avenue, Whyalla Norrie, South Australia
- Stuart High School, Whyalla Stuart, South Australia
- the Electoral division of Stuart in the Northern Territory,
- Electoral district of Stuart, an electoral division in South Australia,
- Stuart Range upland, close to the town of Stuart Range which was changed to Coober Pedy, and
- the town of Stuart, which was changed to Alice Springs in 1933.

A statue by James White honouring Stuart can be found in Victoria Square, Adelaide, while in Darwin, both a statue and a monument celebrate his achievements.

In March 2010, the McDouall Stuart Lodge of Freemasons in Alice Springs commissioned a 4-metre high ferro-concrete statue of Stuart for donation to the Alice Springs Town Council to commemorate the 150th anniversary of Stuart's fourth expedition, during which he had reached the centre of the continent. The statue is located in a heritage precinct near the old hospital.

In England, Stuart is commemorated by a blue plaque on the house where he lived and died in Kensington, London, No. 9 Campden Hill Square. In 2011 his grave in Kensal Green cemetery, London, was refurbished to its former glory. In Dysart, Scotland there is also a blue plaque on the house where he was born. The property, John McDouall Stuart View, is available as a holiday let, restored and owned by Fife Historic Buildings Trust.

Stuart is commemorated in the scientific name of a species of Australian lizard, Ctenotus stuarti.

== Associates ==
Among those who shared Stuart's travails were:

- William Darton Kekwick (c. 1830 – 16 October 1872) arrived in South Australia with his widowed father and seven siblings in April 1840 aboard Warrior. He was second-in-command to Stuart on each of his expeditions from the third (1859). On 19 June 1860 Stuart named Kekwick Ponds in the Northern Territory for his trusted deputy.

Kekwick married Marian Caroline Owen in 1864 and had four children. He was appointed mineral and botanical collector for William Gosse's expedition to Central Australia, but fell ill before they set out, and died at Nuccaleena on the way back to Adelaide. His remains were buried at Blinman and a monument erected over the grave by the Royal Geographical Society of South Australia.

- Francis William Thring (1 May 1837 – 17 July 1908), born in Netherhampton, England, the son of a lawyer, he arrived in South Australia with his parents and three siblings in November 1849 aboard Duke of Wellington. He was a member of Stuart's last two exploration parties, in 1860–61 and 1861–62.

He was a member of one more brief but noteworthy exploration party, that of John McKinlay to the Top End in 1865–66. Government had grown impatient at Finniss's lack of progress at Escape Cliffs and sent McKinlay to report, and to investigate alternative sites for the new settlement. The expedition proved a near-disaster but recommended Port Darwin as a better location. Thring served as manager of stations at Angaston and Two Wells. He opened a business in Adelaide as a stock and station agent.
He married Clara Davey (28 January 1843 – 10 March 1934) in 1868 and had thirteen children. They had a home in Regent Street, Parkside, where he died. His remains were interred at the West Terrace Cemetery and a monument erected over the grave by the Royal Geographical Society of South Australia.
Family
Francis William Thring (1 May 1837 – 17 July 1908) married Clara (c. 1842 – 10 March 1934) in 1868. Among their children were:
- Ellen Maud Mary Thring (1868 – 2 March 1945) married Walter James Blackmore
- William Francis Thring (1873– ) lived Mount Magnet, married Sarah Jane "Sis" Mowforth in 1902.
- Charlotte (1881– ) married William Garrett Ryan in 1913
- Adelaide Frances (1883– ) married (Samuel) Hamilton Boyd of Stanley Street, Woodville Park in 1915
- Beatrice Margaret "Trixie" (1885–) married Charles Edwin Ashford Lucy in 1911
- Mabel Alice (1887– ) married Arthur Edwin Box in 1912

== Sources ==
- Serle, Percival (1949). "Stuart, John McDouall". Dictionary of Australian Biography. Sydney: Angus & Robertson.
- Explorations in Australia edited by William Hardman. Hesperian Press
- John McDouall Stuart by Mona Stuart Webster. Melbourne University Press
- John McDouall Stuart Society Inc.
- Whyalla Stuart High School
