= Palmerston Interchange =

Bus interchange in Palmerston, Northern Territory

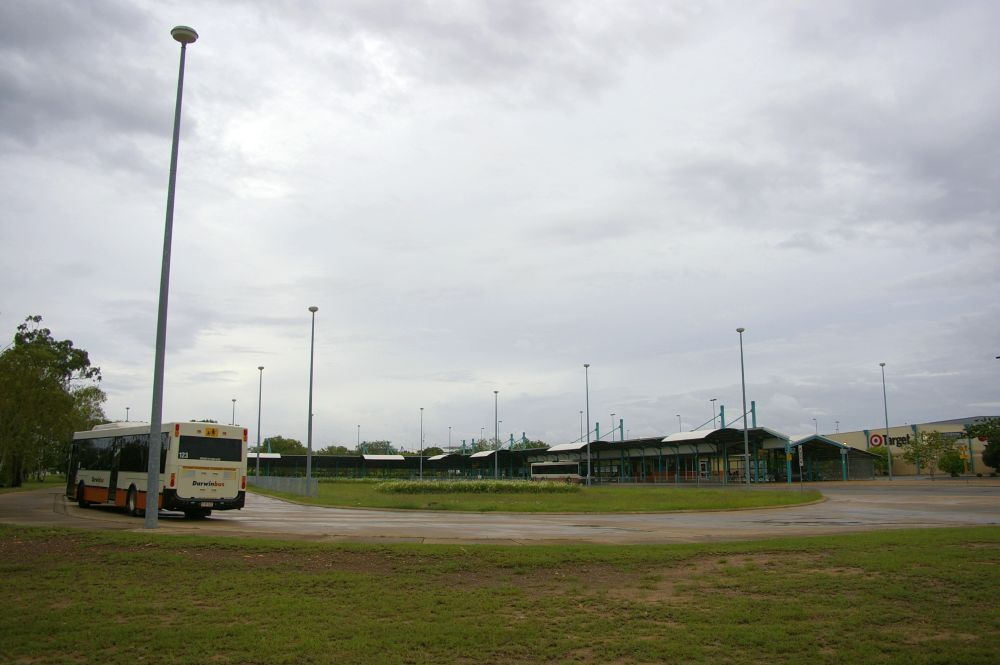
- Bus 123 at Palmerston in 2008.

General information
- Location: Palmerston, Northern Territory
- Owner: Northern Territory Government
- Bus routes: 20
- Bus stands: 18
- Bus operators: CDC Northern Territory

Construction
- Parking: Yes
- Cycle facilities: Yes
- Accessible: Yes

Other information
- Website: NT Department of Infrastructure and Logistics

History
- Opened: 1985

Palmerston Interchange is a bus interchange located in Palmerston, Northern Territory, Australia. The interchange is made up of 18 bus bays with 11 of them dedicated to bus services under Darwinbus being operated by the sole operator of the network, CDC Northern Territory. All other stands are for private and regional bus services.

== History ==
Palmerston Interchange opened in 1985 to provide a bus hub to the new satellite city of Palmerston. The interchange is located on The Boulevard and pedestrian links are provided to the nearby Palmerston Shopping Centre.

In 2021, a new and improved bus Park 'n' Ride was built opening on 1 November 2021 to increase parking capacity and increase safety and accessibility.

Additional roof extensions, lighting, and facility upgrades led by Norbuilt were completed in January 2024. This featured a new shade shelter over bus stands B, C and D.

In May 2025, the CLP government announced its NT bus safety reform strategy, This led to improved safety on the interchange, increased transit officer patrols and classical music was put up to deter loitering. The NT government is also undergoing a review to close Palmerston Interchange to further improve safety.

== Services ==
Palmerston Interchange are served by Darwinbus services.

Service	Destination	Notes
Bay A
Salvation Army Shuttle	Darwin Correctional Centre
Bay B
445	Humpty Doo	via Cooalinga, Noonamah & Cox Peninsula Interchange
Bay C
440	Rural Loop	via Virginia, Noonamah, Humpty Doo & Cooalinga
446	Gulnare Rd, Bees Creek	via Virginia
Bay D
447	Humpty Doo	via Howard Springs, Mcminns Lagoon
Bay E
450	Humpty Doo	via Howard Springs, Girraween
Bay G
77	Palmerston Loop	via Palmerston Indigenous Village, Rosebery, Bellamack
78	Palmerston Loop	via Yarrawonga
Bay I
71	Palmerston Loop	via Gray, Woodroffe
Bay J
8	Darwin Harry Chan Ave	via Hospital, Tiwi, Brinkin, Nakara
OL1	Darwin Harry Chan Ave	via Berrimah, Limited Stops
Bay K
9	Casuarina Interchange	via Pinelands, Berrimah, Karama
OL2	Casuarina Interchange	via Karama, Limited Stops
Bay L
70	Palmerston Loop	via Driver, Moulden
Bay M
28	Darwin Harry Chan Ave	Express
72	Palmerston Loop	via Gunn, Bakewell, Rosebery
Bay N
73	Palmerston Loop	via Driver, Durack, Charles Darwin University (Palmerston Campus)
