= Bakewell, Northern Territory =

Bakewell
- Suburb
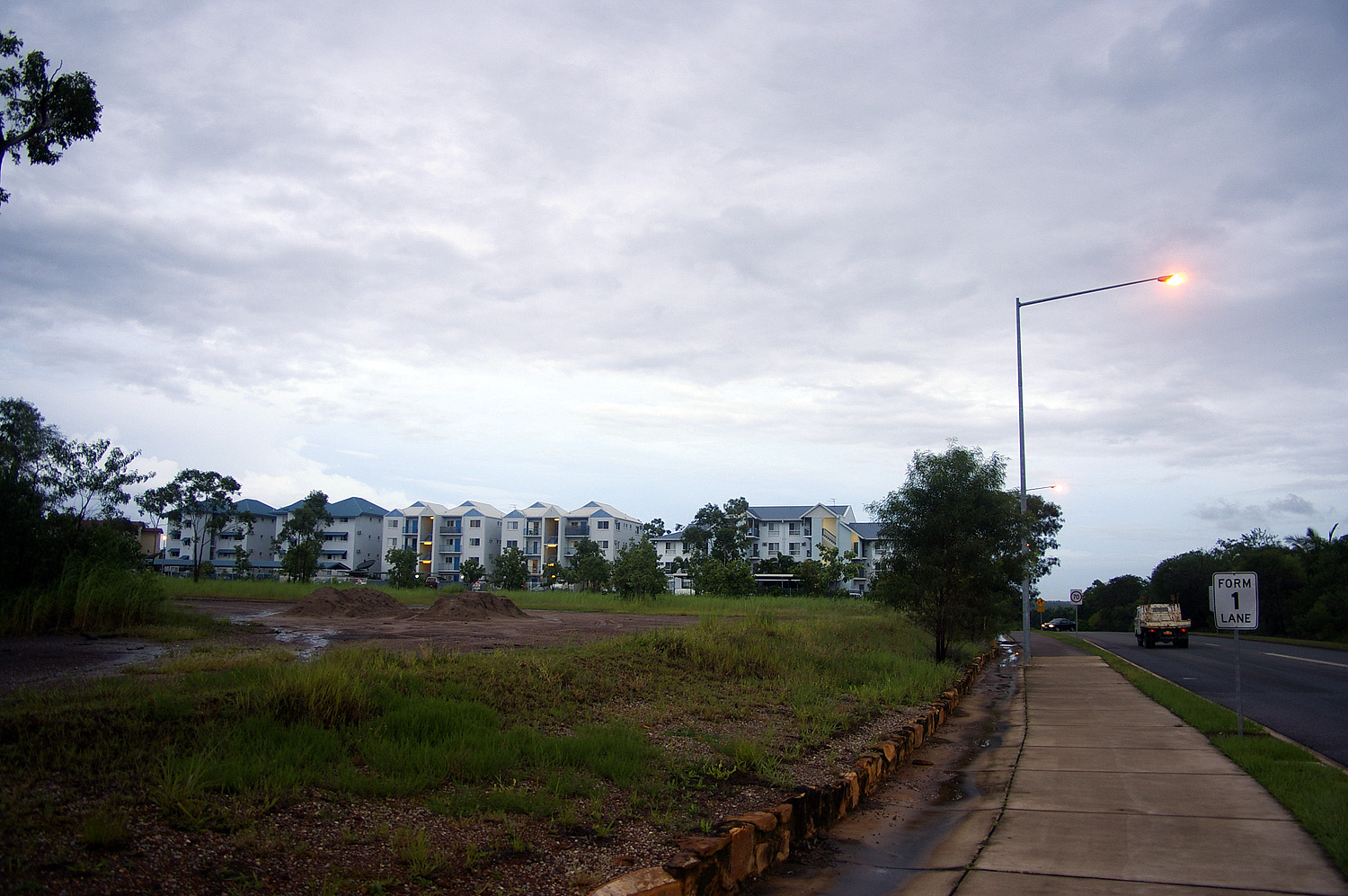

- Interactive map of Bakewell
- Coordinates: 12°29′55″S 130°59′34″E
- Country: Australia
- State: Northern Territory
- City: Darwin
- LGA: City of Palmerston
- Location: 24.9 km (15.5 mi) from Darwin; 2.9 km (1.8 mi) from Palmerston
- Established: 1990s

Government
  - Territory electorate: Brennan
  - Federal division: Solomon

Area
  - Total: 1.37 km^{2} (0.53 sq mi)

Population
  - Total: 3,069 (2016 census)
  - Density: 2,240/km^{2} (5,802/sq mi)
- Postcode: 0832
Suburbs around Bakewell
Gray	Gunn	Johnston
Woodroffe	Bakewell	Johnston
Woodroffe	Rosebery	Zuccoli

Bakewell is an inner-city suburb of Palmerston, Australia. It is 24.9 km southeast of the Darwin CBD. Its local government area is the City of Palmerston. It is on the traditional Country and waterways of the Larrakia people.

Bakewell is bounded to the north by Buscall Avenue, to the west is Chung Wah Terrace, and to the south and east is Lambrick Avenue. Development of the area dates from the 1990s. Bakewell is named after Edward Howard Bakewell, an original landowner.

== Recreation ==
Bakewell has a number of well looked after public parks with public toilets which are cleaned daily. The largest park is on the border of the suburb Gunn and Bakewell itself. It includes 3 extremely large ponds and a children's playground which should soon be in the process of rehabilitation. The ponds are man made but they do very slowly run out into the wilderness and new water is pumped back in. At certain times of the year many children come to put remote controlled boats into the water.
