= Archer, Northern Territory =

Archer
- Suburb
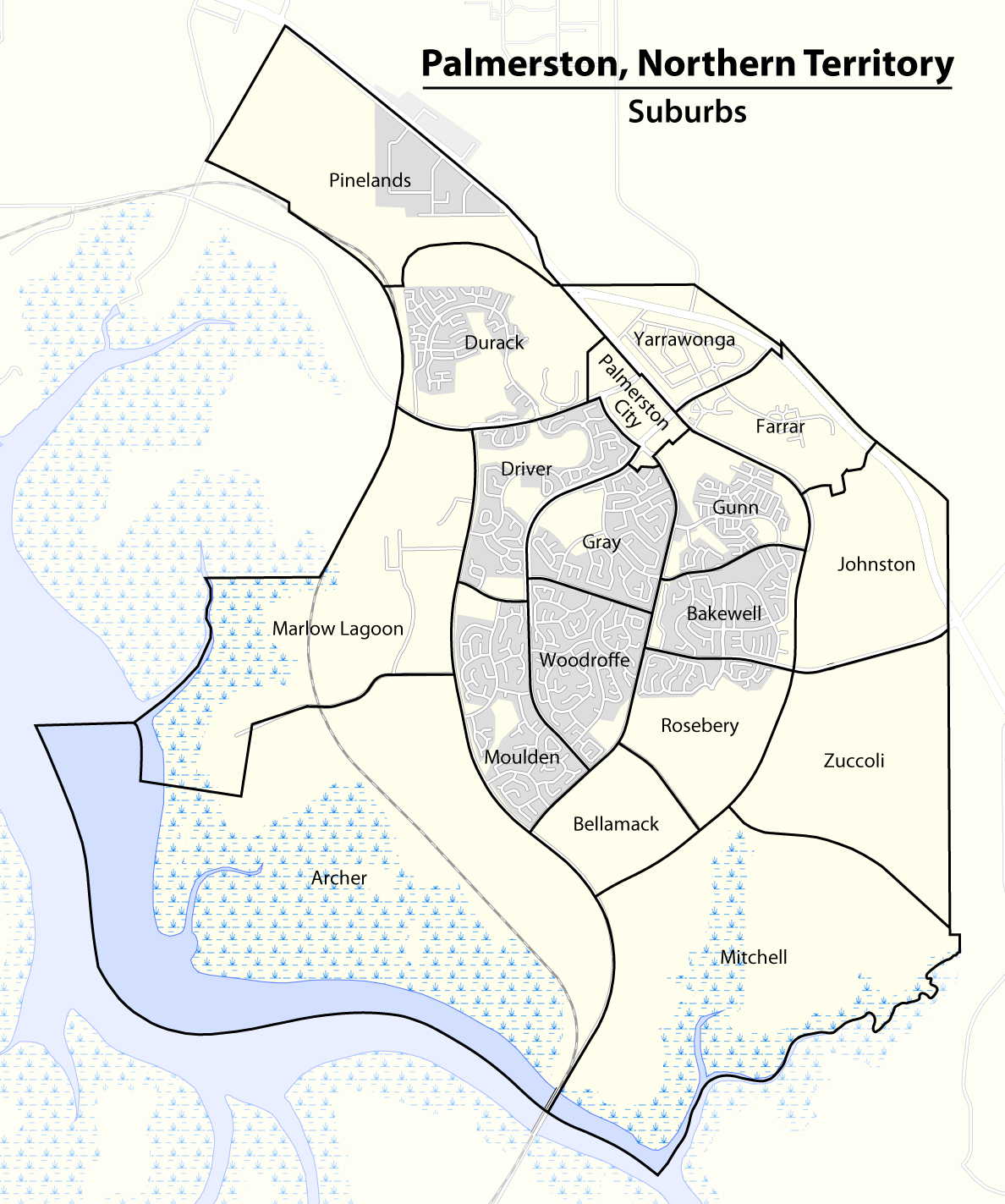
- Archer in the southwestern part of the City of Palmerston

- Interactive map of Archer
- Coordinates: 12°30′44″S 130°58′16″E
- Country: Australia
- State: Northern Territory
- City: Palmerston
- LGA: City of Palmerston
- Location: 25.0 km (15.5 mi) from Darwin; 5.4 km (3.4 mi) from Palmerston
- Established: 1970s

Government
  - Territory electorate: Blain
  - Federal division: Solomon

Population
  - Total: 0 (2021 census)
- Postcode: 0830
Suburbs around Archer
Elrundie	Elrundie; Marlow Lagoon	Moulden
Wickham	Archer	Moulden; Bellamack; Mitchell
Wickham	Wickham; Weddell	Weddell

Archer is a relatively new and still sparsely populated suburb in the southwestern part of Palmerston. It is 25 km SE of the Darwin CBD and 5.4 km from Palmerston City. It is on the traditional Country and waterways of the Larrakia people. Its local government area is the City of Palmerston. Archer is the largest suburb of Palmerston by area.

The suburb was named after James C. Archer, former Administrator of the Northern Territory.
