= Rosebery, Northern Territory =

Rosebery
- Suburb
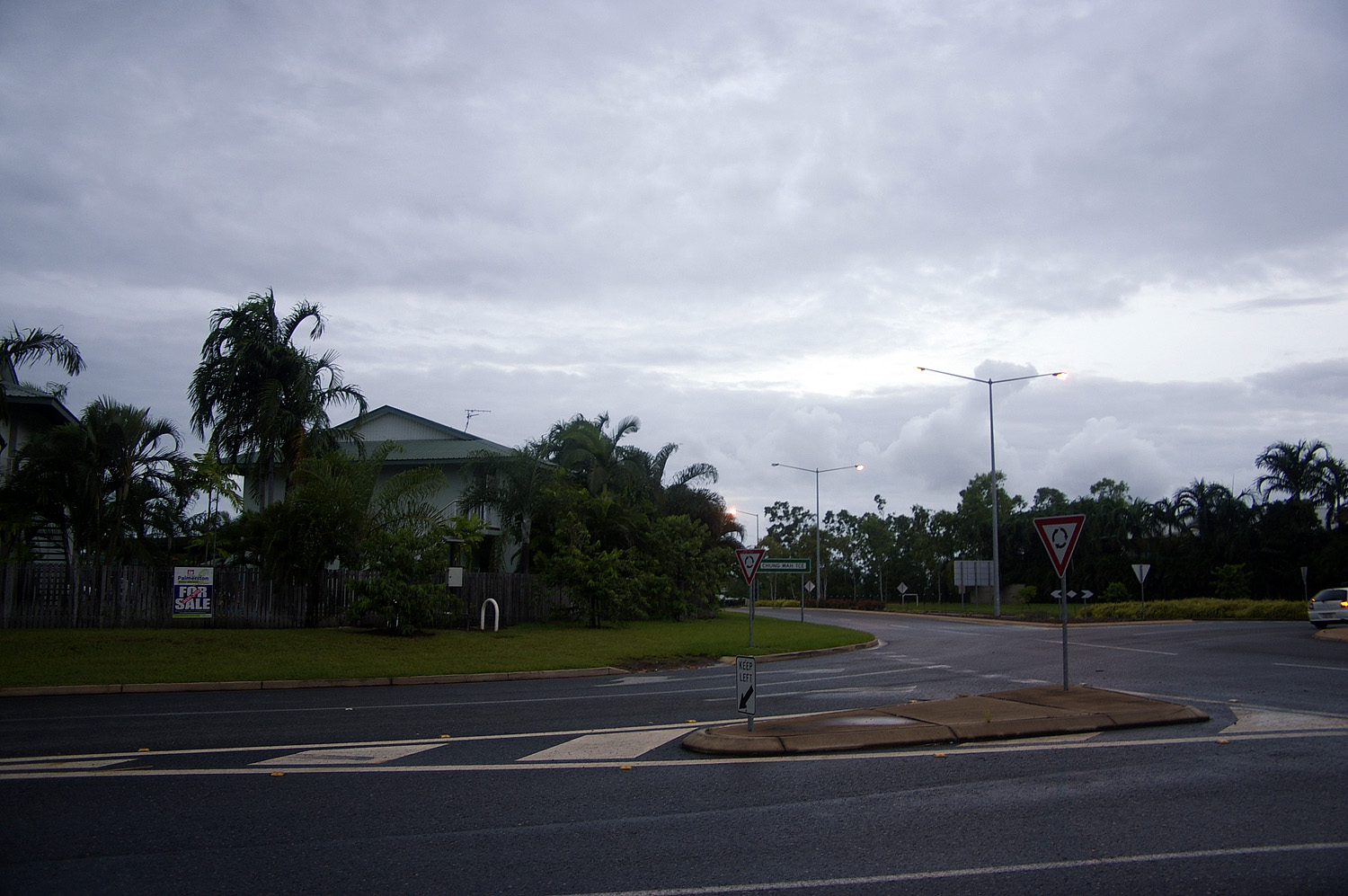
- Suburb of Rosebery

- Interactive map of Rosebery
- Coordinates: 12°30′17″S 130°59′31″E
- Country: Australia
- State: Northern Territory
- City: Rosebery
- LGA: City of Palmerston
- Location: 26.1 km (16.2 mi) from Darwin; 3.1 km (1.9 mi) from Palmerston
- Established: 1990s

Government
  - Territory electorate: Blain
  - Federal division: Solomon

Area
  - Total: 1.7 km^{2} (0.66 sq mi)

Population
  - Total: 4,218 (2016 census)
  - Density: 2,480/km^{2} (6,430/sq mi)
- Postcode: 0832
Suburbs around Rosebery
Woodroffe	Bakewell	Johnston
Woodroffe	Rosebery	Zuccoli
Woodroffe	Bellamack	Mitchell

Rosebery is an outer southern suburb of Palmerston. It is located 26 km SE of the Darwin CBD. Its Local Government Area is the City of Palmerston. It is on the traditional Country and waterways of the Larrakia people.

This suburb is named after the Fifth Earl of Rosebery, Archibald Philip Primrose, a then British statesman who visited South Australia in 1884. A decade later he became the prime minister of the United Kingdom.

It was during his overseas visit, that the South Australian Government decided to name additional Counties in the Top End. After the initial group of Palmerston, Gladstone and Disraeli, the County of Rosebery was gazetted in 1885. Rosebery covered the area north of Pine Creek.

The Place Names Committee in conjunction with the Palmerston Development Authority decided to perpetuate the Rosebery name as the County of Rosebery fell into disuse and was cancelled on 7 January 1977.

Rosebery is located on the periphery of Palmerston and is one of its newer residential suburbs. It has experienced a lot of growth in recent times.
