= City of Palmerston =

Coordinates: 12.4939°S 130.9818°E

- Local government area
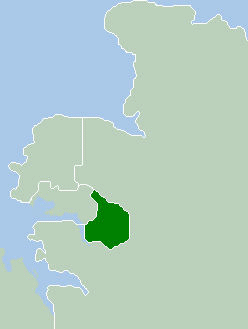
- Location within Darwin metropolitan area

- Interactive map of City of Palmerston
- Country: Australia
- State: Northern Territory
- Region: Outer Darwin
- Established: 1981
- Council seat: Palmerston City

Government
  - Mayor: Athina Pascoe-Bell
  - Territory electorate: Blain, Brennan, Drysdale, Spillett
  - Federal divisions: Solomon; Lingiari

Area
  - Total: 52.7 km^{2} (20.3 sq mi)

Population
  - Total: 37,862 (2018)
  - Density: 718.4/km^{2} (1,860.8/sq mi)
- Website: City of Palmerston
LGAs around City of Palmerston
Northern Territory Rates Act Area	Litchfield	Litchfield
Unincorporated (Elrundie)	City of Palmerston	Litchfield
Litchfield	Litchfield	Litchfield

The City of Palmerston is a local government area of the Northern Territory of Australia. It contains the suburbs of Darwin's satellite city, Palmerston, and is situated between the outer industrial areas of Darwin and the rural areas of Howard Springs. The City covers an area of 52.7 square kilometres (20.3 sq mi) and in June 2018 had a population of 37,862.

The Palmerston City Council consists of the Mayor and seven aldermen. The city is not divided into wards, thus each alderman represents constituents from the entire city. Council elections are held in August every four years. The next election is in 2025.

== History ==
The City of Palmerston was incorporated in 1981 under the Local Government Act (NT), and in 2000 was proclaimed the Northern Territory's second city.

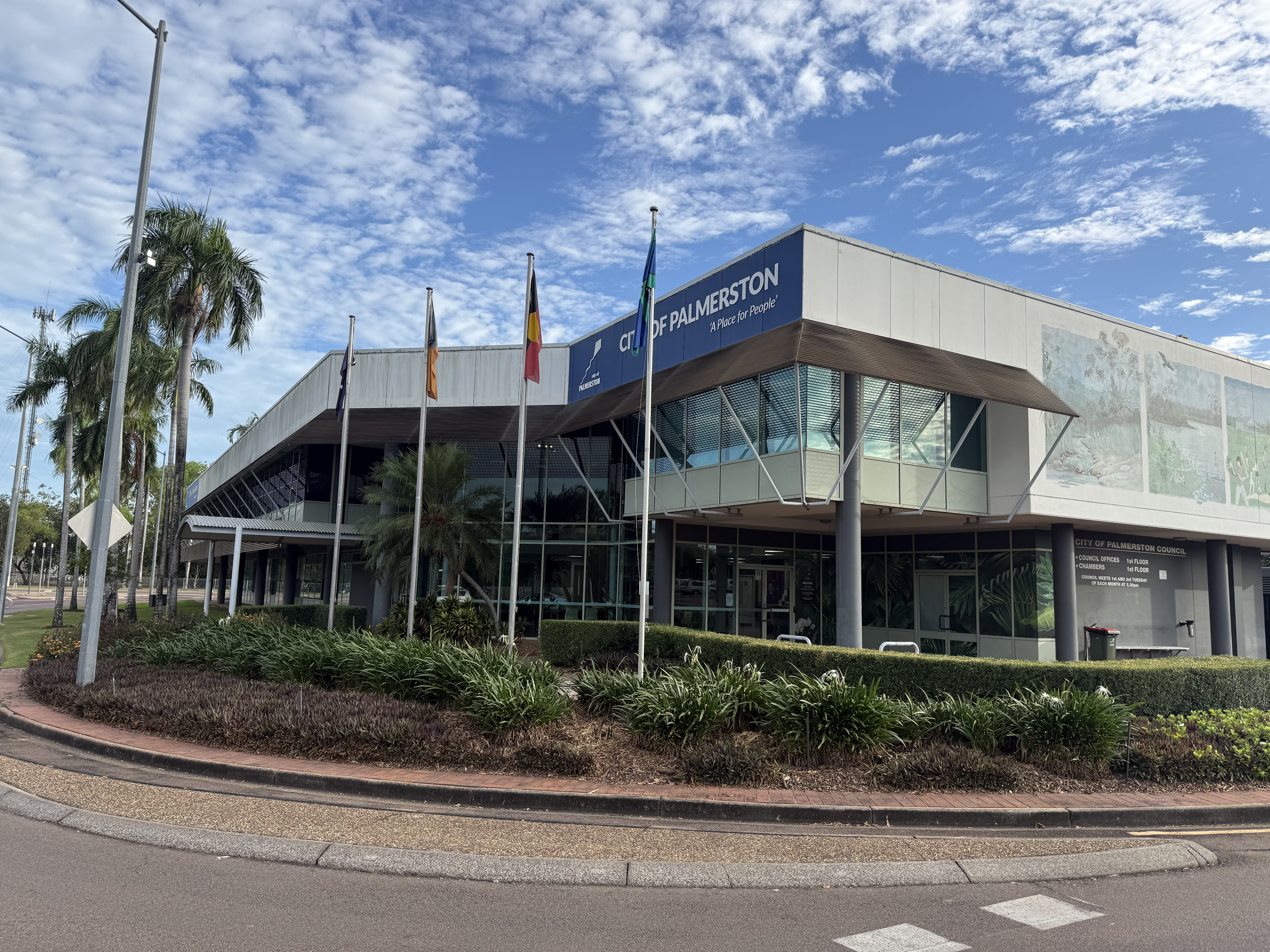
City of Palmerston Council building, October 2025

== Election results ==
=== 2025 ===
2025 Northern Territory Mayor elections: Palmerston
Party	Candidate	Votes	%	±%
Independent	Athina Pascoe-Bell (elected)	6,772	48.8	−25.2
Independent CLP	Rob Waters	2,933	21.1	+21.1
Independent Labor	Dani Eveleigh	1,824	13.1	+13.1
Independent	Cindy Mebbingarri Roberts	1,218	8.8	+8.8
Independent	Raj Samson Rajwin	973	7.0	−3.4
Independent	Appa Rao Adari	167	1.2	+1.2
Total formal votes		13,887	93.6	−1.4
Informal votes		955	6.4	+1.4
Turnout		14,842	57.3	−7.3

2025 Northern Territory local elections: Palmerston
Party	Candidate	Votes	%	±%
Independent	Lucy Morrison (elected)	2,038	15.0	
Independent CLP	Wayne Bayliss (elected)	1,739	12.8	
Independent CLP	Rob Waters (elected)	1,302	9.6	
Independent Labor	Damian Hale (elected)	1,261	9.3	
Independent	Mark Fraser (elected)	1,120	8.3	
Independent Labor	Yolanda Kanyai (elected)	1,091	8.0	
Independent	Sarah Henderson (elected)	1,041	7.7	
Total formal votes		13,569	91.9	
Informal votes		1,197	8.1	
Turnout		14,766	57.0	

=== 2021 ===
2021 Northern Territory local elections: Palmerston
Party	Votes	%	Swing	Seats	Change
Independents	10,972	78.8		5	
Independent Labor	2,286	16.4		1	
Independent CLP	666	4.8		1	
Total	13,924	100.0	–	7	Steady
Informal votes	1,324	8.7			
Turnout	15,248	64.7			
Enrolled voters	23,559		+10.8		

=== 2018 ===
2018 Palmerston City Council election: Councillors
Party	Candidate	Votes	%	±%
Independent Labor	Damian Hale (elected)	2,047	17.2	
Independent	Athina Pascoe-Bell	1,827	15.4	
Independent	Lucy Buhr (elected)	1,354	11.4	
Independent	Tom Lewis (elected)	945	7.9	
Independent	Sarah Henderson (elected)	899	7.6	
Independent	Mick Spick (elected)	721	6.1	
Independent	Ian Abbott	574	4.8	
Independent	Adrian Burkenhagen	545	4.6	
Independent	Raj Samson Rajwin	509	4.3	
Independent	Trevor Jenkins	479	4.0	
Independent	Matt Stripling	464	3.9	
Independent	Benjamin Giesecke (elected)	341	2.9	
Independent	Margy Kerle	310	2.6	
Independent	Amber Garden (elected)	295	2.5	
Independent	Martin Blakemore	273	2.3	
Independent	Jeff Stewart	160	1.3	
Independent	Anita Newman	152	1.3	
Total formal votes		11,895	87.0	
Informal votes		1,776	13.0	
Turnout		13,671	64.3	

== Suburbs ==
Suburbs of the inner city and of the outskirts, with post codes in parentheses:

Suburbs Map	Inner City	Outskirts
	Bakewell (0832); Bellamack (0832); Durack (0830); Driver (0830); Farrar (0830); Gray (0830); Gunn (0832); Moulden (0830); Palmerston City (0830); Rosebery (0832); Woodroffe (0830); Yarrawonga (0830)	Archer (0830); Johnston (0830); Marlow Lagoon (0830); Mitchell (0832); Pinelands (0829); Zuccoli (0830)

== Sister cities ==
- Kupang, West Timor

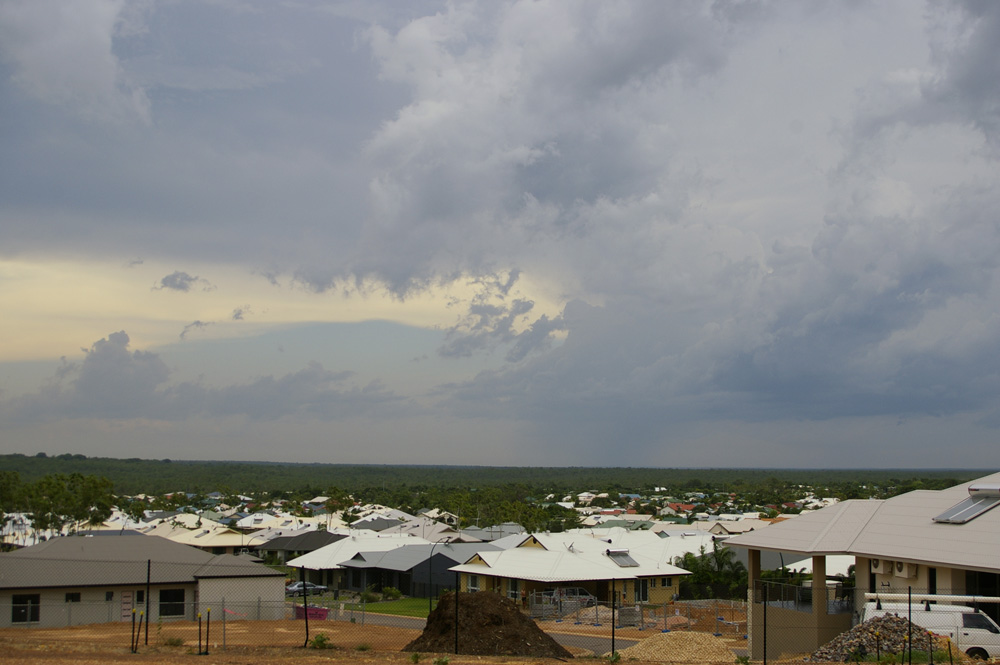
Looking over the suburb of Farrar

Communications between the City of Palmerston and Kupang ceased in 2009 and a letter from previous Mayor, Robert Macleod was sent to the Mayor of Kupang advising him that Council had decided not to enter into a new agreement with the City of Kupang.
