= Mitchell, Northern Territory =

Mitchell
- Suburb
- Coordinates: 12°31′50″S 130°59′44″E
- Country: Australia
- State: Northern Territory
- City: Darwin
- LGA: City of Palmerston
- Location: 18 km (11 mi) from Darwin City; 6.2 km (3.9 mi) from Palmerston
- Established: 17 October 1984

Government
  - Territory electorate: Brennan
  - Federal division: Lingiari

Population
  - Total: 0 (2016 census)
- Time zone: UTC+9:30 (ACST)
- Postcode: 0832
- Mean max temp: 32.0 °C (89.6 °F)
- Mean min temp: 23.2 °C (73.8 °F)
- Annual rainfall: 1,725.1 mm (67.92 in)
Suburbs around Mitchell
Bellamack	Bellamack; Rosebery; Zuccoli	Virginia
Bellamack; Archer	Mitchell	Virginia
Weddell	Weddell; Virginia	Virginia
- Locations; Adjoining suburbs

Mitchell is a suburb in the Northern Territory of Australia located in the city of Palmerston about 18 kilometres (11 mi) south-east of Darwin City.

It is on the traditional Country and waterways of the Larrakia people.

Mitchell consists of land bounded by the centre of the channels of the Elizabeth River and Brooking Creek respectively to the south and to the east, the Channel Island Road and Roystonea Avenue to the west, and Bertram Road in part in the north.

Mitchell's name is derived from A.J. Mitchell, a member of the Goyder expedition to the Northern Territory who was involved during 1869–70 in the surveying of land now part of the current city of Palmerston and its hinterland. The suburb's boundary and name were originally gazetted on 17 October 1984 and revoked on 5 December 2001. It was re-registered on 3 April 2007 with a new set of boundaries which were subsequently altered on 24 May 2018.

As of 2019, land within Mitchell has been not developed and is zoned as follows – land along its southern and eastern boundaries and a watercourse passing through its centre from south to north is zoned as "Conservation" with the remainder is zoned being as "Future Development".

The 2016 Australian census which was conducted in August 2016 reports that Mitchell had no people living within its boundaries.

Mitchell is located within the federal division of Lingiari, the territory electoral division of Brennan and the local government area of City of Palmerston.
