= E. H. Bakewell =

Pastorslist and businessman

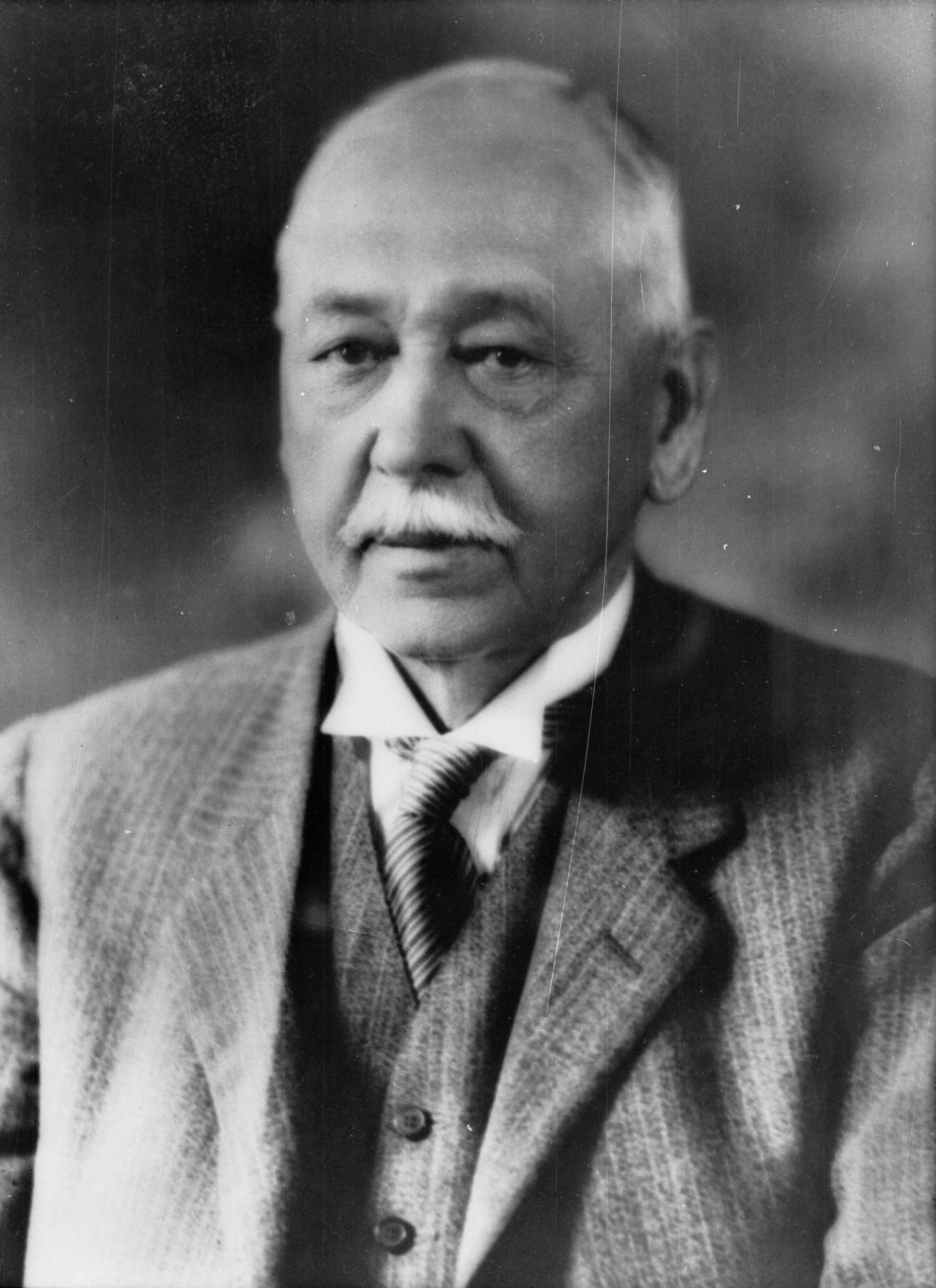
Portrait of E. H. Bakewell, 1944

Edward Howard Bakewell (6 July 1859 – 31 March 1944) was a South Australian pastoralist, businessman and administrator.

Born at North Adelaide, he was a son of Samuel Bakewell (ca.1815 – 22 September 1888), who arrived in South Australia in 1839, and his wife Eliza Hannah Bakewell (née Pye). He was among the earliest scholars at Prince Alfred College. On completing his education he joined the staff of the National Bank as a ledger-keeper, and after three years there he gained experience in the north of the State in flour milling and in the pastoral Industry.

== Pastoral interests ==
The pastoral industry particularly, attracted his attention, and for more than 50 years he was closely associated with it. For many years he was managing director of the Willowie Land and Pastoral Association Ltd., which held large freehold and leasehold properties in the northern parts of South Australia and the Northern Territory. For many years also he was general manager of the estate of the John Howard Angas, which included the famous Hill River Estate, Point Sturt Stud Cattle Estate, Kings-ford, and other northern properties. For 10 years he was managing partner of Coronga Park Station. NSW, and Tarella Station, near White Cliffs, New South Wales. For about 12 years he was managing director of Yalkuri Station, Lake Alexandrina.

Bakewell was president of the Central Council of Employers for three and a half years, and president for two years of the Pastoralists' Association of SA. During his term of office the wool committees were formed to deal with the Australian wool clips under the British purchase scheme, and Bakewell represented South Australia on the committee. During his term of office as president of the Pastoralists' Association, Bakewell was instrumental in the formation of the first Stockowners Cooperative Shearing Company in Australia, and at the time of his death was chairman of the company. The idea adopted in South Australia has since been copied by the other States.

Bakewell, a suburb of the City of Palmerston in the Northern Territory was named for him, as was Bakewell Street, Union Town, in the Victoria-Daly Shire Council.

== Business interests ==
At the time of his death he was chairman and managing director of the South Australian Portland Cement Co., a position he had held for more than 50 years. He had seen the company grow from its initiation to its present prominence, and its progress was largely due to his initiative and enterprise.

He was, with David Mitchell, John Gibson and C. H. Angas a member of Sir John Monash's South Australian Reinforced Concrete Co. Ltd. in 1907

For 20 years Bakewell was the SA Director of the Commercial Union Assurance Co. Ltd., and for some years was chairman of directors of the company.

== Municipal Tramways Trust ==
Bakewell's name is closely associated with Adelaide's Municipal Tramways Trust. He was appointed chairman of the Trust by the Government in succession to its first chairman, A. B. Moncrieff (1845–1928) in 1922, and during his 15 years' occupancy of that office played a prominent part in the progress made by the Trust, and as a mark of appreciation named the overway bridge at Mile End after him.

Adelaide's Bakewell Bridge (on Glover Avenue/Henley Beach Road over the railway and Port Road East/Railway Terrace, Mile End) was named for him. Built to carry trams and vehicular traffic, it was opened on 22 December 1925 and demolished in 2007. The replacement underpass was opened in January 2008.

== Other interests ==
Although he never entered Parliament, Bakewell always showed a keen interest in politics, and for many years was one of the leaders of the Liberal and Country League and was chairman of the finance committee of the Liberal and Country League for many years. He was a member of the Liberal Club Ltd. from its inception. Bakewell's services were engaged by the Government on numerous occasions.

He was president of the Australian National League 1907–1910

Bakewell was one of the most prominent members of the Employers' Federation, of which he was chairman from 1915 to 1929. In that capacity he always strongly supported the practice of bringing employers and employees together through the medium of round table conferences, which, he always held did away with much misunderstanding and bitterness. He was a strong opponent of overlapping Federal and State legislation, and held that industrial matters should be subject to State legislation wherever possible. One of his outstanding achievements was the bringing about of closer unity among large and small employers of labour.

In 1928 he was appointed a member of the Commonwealth Land Valuation Board, formed to deal with objections lodged by taxpayers against the valuation of land assessed for land tax purposes. He was also prominent in Masonic circles, and was a member of the council and executive of the Stockowners' Association.

== Death and tributes ==
Bakewell died suddenly aboard the train to Morgan, where he was to attend the official opening of the Morgan – Whyalla pipeline (he was a Member of the executive committee of the River Murray League in 1904). When he attended his office in Adelaide the previous Thursday he appeared in good health, and his death came as a great shock to his associates.

The general manager of the Tramways Trust (Sir William Goodman) said he had learned of the death of Mr. Bakewell with deep regret. They had been friends for many years. During the 15 years Bakewell had been chairman of the Trust they had been closely associated, and he had found him anxious at all times to do his best for the board and the public. He was a fine all-round business man of wide experience, and his death would be a distinct loss to the community. He was a good citizen and worked very hard for the welfare of his country.

The obituary writer for The Advertiser observed that he was "gifted with remarkable business acumen, he had been aptly described as a leader of men. His leadership of the Employers' Federation and the Municipal Tramways Trust over long periods was marked by remarkable progress, and his record will be a lasting monument to service in the public interest."

== Family ==
Edward Howard Bakewell married Octavia Eleanor "Ellie" Wilson (18 March 1861 – 7 October 1934), daughter of Rev. W. Wilson, on 12 October 1886. Their children included:

- Eleanor Gladys Bakewell (1887–1967) never married
- Dorothy Grace Bakewell (1891– ) married Rev. Alfred Wylleoffe De Pledge Sykes, of Medindie, South Australia on 9 January 1912
- Gwendoline Enid Bakewell (1893– ) married Toussaint Charles Dewez, of Toorak, Victoria, on 4 May 1915
- Howard Keith Bakewell (1896–1972) of Yalkuri Station, Narrung, South Australia
- Robert Donald Bakewell (1899– ), pastoralist of Benalla, Victoria, subject of an ADB biography
- Evelyn Marjorie Bakewell (1899– ) married Ross Macrow of Adelaide in 1930

He married again, to Florence (died 1957; no other details yet found). They had homes "Wyuna" at Victoria Avenue, Unley Park; "Marmion", Magill Road, Tranmere; and 80 Northgate Street, Millswood.
