= Elizabeth River Bridge =

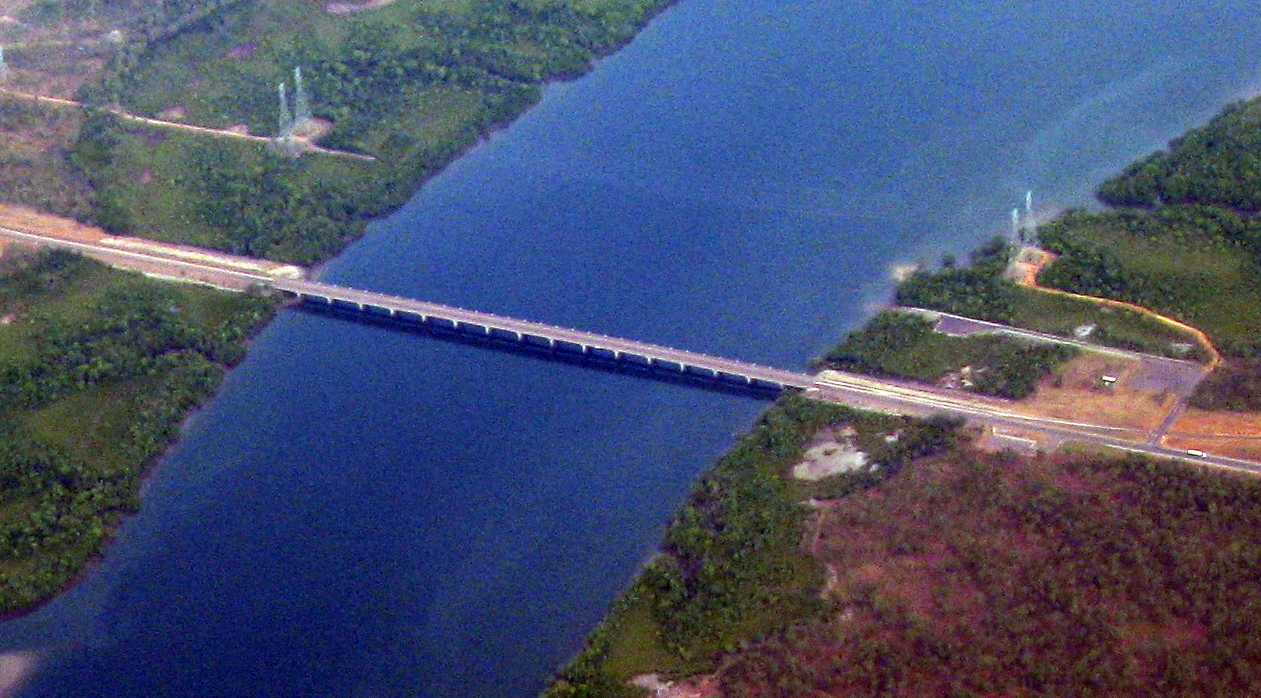
- Aerial view of Elizabeth River Bridge
- Coordinates: 12°32′29″S 130°58′36″E
- Carries: Road and railway
- Crosses: Elizabeth River
- Locale: Archer and Wickham
- Owner: Northern Territory Government

Characteristics
- Material: Concrete
- Total length: 500 metres (1,600 ft)
- No. of spans: 30 metres (98 ft) precast concrete beams

History
- Opened: 1980s

The Elizabeth River Bridge is a road bridge which crosses Elizabeth River about 17 kilometres (11 mi) south of the Darwin city centre, in the Northern Territory of Australia.

The bridge carries the Channel Island Road over the river from the suburb of Archer to the locality of Wickham. The bridge was established as part of the infrastructure works associated with the Channel Island Power Station.

During the 2001-2002 financial year, its width was increased to accommodate the Adelaide-Darwin railway.

It is 500 metres (1,600 ft) long.
