= Samuel Bakewell =

Australian politician

Samuel Bakewell (ca.1815 – 22 September 1888) was a wholesale grocer and politician in the young colony of South Australia.

== History ==
Samuel was born in Leicester, England, and emigrated on the Superb, arriving in South Australia on 11 July 1839.

He joined the brothers John and Thomas Waterhouse's grocery business on the corner of Rundle and King William Streets (later Duhst & Biven's) opposite the Beehive Corner. Around 1850 he opened his own wholesale grocery, "China tea warehouse", in Hindley Street (then the premier retail area), and was financially successful.

He was elected to the City of Adelaide seat in the South Australian House of Assembly and served from March 1860 to November 1862.

He was a member of the Strangers' Friend Society.

== Family ==
Samuel Bakewell married Mary Ann Pye (c.1824 – 25 May 1853) at Trinity Church, Adelaide on 24 April 1849. He married again, to her sister Eliza Hannah Pye (c. 1828 – 11 August 1882) at Trinity Church, Adelaide, on 25 July 1854. They had a home at Strangways Terrace, North Adelaide. Their children included:

- Elizabeth Webb Bakewell (21 February 1850 – 3 August 1943) married Alfred Richard Nicholls ( – 11 November 1920) on 2 August 1870. Elizabeth was a prominent worker in the Temperance cause.
- Agnes Caroline Bakewell (10 November 1851 – 13 May 1913) married Arthur Pomeroy (c. 1848 – 13 January 1931) on 26 June 1873
- Alfred Thomas Bakewell (29 April 1853 – 5 February 1916) married Emma Symonds (14 September 1853 – 28 March 1938) on 29 April 1886
- Sarah Ann Bakewell (16 May 1856 – before 1894) married John Sampson Torr ( – ) on 16 January 1889
- Edward Howard Bakewell (6 July 1859 – 31 March 1944) was a businessman and chairman of the Metropolitan Tramways Trust, and for whom the Bakewell Bridge, since demolished, was named.
- Frederick Arnold Bakewell (6 December 1865 – ) married Esther Stickland (c. 1862 – 21 July 1926) on 21 April 1885

His brother William Bakewell (ca.1817 – 25 January 1870) was also a politician.

Alfred Billing (9 November 1838 – 7 August 1908), the Mount Gambier timber merchant, was a nephew.
