= MacKillop Catholic College, Palmerston =

MacKillop Catholic College

Location
- 285 Farrar Boulevard, Johnston; Palmerston, Northern Territory; Australia
- Coordinates: 12°29′54″S 131°00′32″E

Information
- Type: Independent co-educational secondary school
- Motto: Lead with Courage
- Denomination: Roman Catholic
- Patron saint(s): Saint Mary MacKillop
- Established: 2012; 13 years ago
- Principal: Lucas Hurley (2021–present)
- Years: 7–12
- Enrolment: ~800
- Campus type: Suburban
- Colour(s): Ochre, navy, white, grey
- Website: www.mackillopnt.catholic.edu.au

MacKillop Catholic College is a Catholic co-educational secondary school located in Palmerston, Northern Territory, Australia. The College opened in 2012 and provides a religious and general education for students from Year 7 to Year 12.

The college is named after Mary MacKillop, Australia's first saint. It is located at the World War II site of the 16 Mile Camp.

MacKillop Catholic College is the home ground of the MacKillop Saints Rugby Club and MASH Netball Club.

== See also ==
- List of schools in the Northern Territory
