= Bellamack =

- Suburb
- Coordinates: 12°31′16″S 130°58′49″E
- Country: Australia
- State: Northern Territory
- City: Darwin
- LGA: City of Palmerston
- Location: 26.5 km (16.5 mi) from Darwin; 5.4 km (3.4 mi) from Palmerston
- Established: 2010

Government
  - Territory electorate: Blain
  - Federal division: Solomon

Population
  - Total: 2,458 (2016 census)
- Postcode: 0832
Suburbs around Bellamack
Woodroffe	Rosebery	Mitchell
Moulden	Bellamack	Mitchell
Archer	Archer	Mitchell

Bellamack is a suburb of Palmerston. It is 26.5 km southeast of the Darwin CBD. Its local government area is the City of Palmerston. It is on the traditional Country and waterways of the Larrakia people.
