= Holtze, Northern Territory =

Holtze
- Suburb
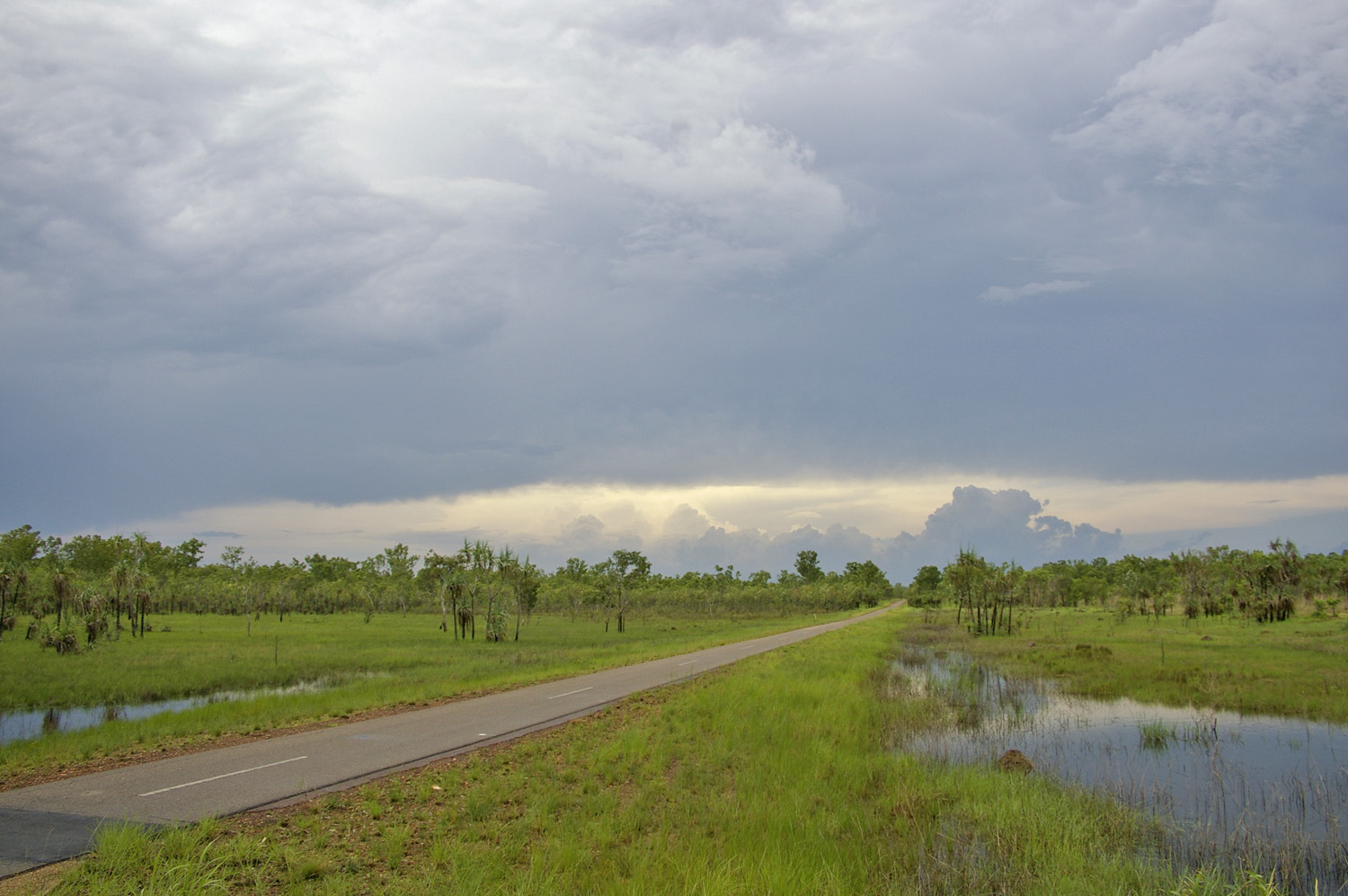

- Interactive map of Holtze
- Coordinates: 12.461°S 130.984°E
- Country: Australia
- State: Northern Territory
- City: Darwin
- LGA: Litchfield Municipality
- Location: 22.4 km (13.9 mi) from Darwin; 3.6 km (2.2 mi) from Palmerston
- Established: 4 April 2007

Government
  - Territory electorate: Nelson
  - Federal division: Lingiari

Population
  - Total: 1,810 (2016 census)
- Postcode: 0829
Suburbs around Holtze
Knuckey Lagoon	Knuckey Lagoon; Shoal Bay	Howard Springs
Knuckey Lagoon; Pinelands	Holtze	Howard Springs
Pinelands	Yarrawonga; Farrar; Johnston; Howard Springs	Howard Springs

Holtze is a locality in Darwin, Northern Territory, Australia. It is 22 km southeast of the Darwin CBD. Its local government area is the Municipality of Litchfield. The locality is mostly a rural area, just north of Palmerston. It was named for Maurice William Holtze (1840–1923), the botanist who established Darwin's Botanical Gardens, and his son Nicholas, who succeeded him as curator.

Robertson Barracks, a major Australian Army base is located in the suburb, west of Thorngate Road.

In September 2010, the Northern Territory Government announced that a new prison precinct, Doug Owston Correctional Centre, would be built in Holtze, about four kilometres north of Howard Springs Road. In July 2012, a road in Holtze was registered and named after prison officer Reginald Anthony Willard (1943–1997), who worked at the correctional centre.

In 2011, the Northern Territory Government identified a greenfield site in Holtze near the intersection of Temple Terrace and the Stuart Highway as the location for the Palmerston Regional Hospital. The hospital opened in 2018.

== Population ==
In the 2016 census, there were 1,810 people in Holtze. Aboriginal and Torres Strait Islander people made up 44.4% of the population.

== See also ==
- Robertson Barracks
