= Marlow Lagoon =

- Suburb
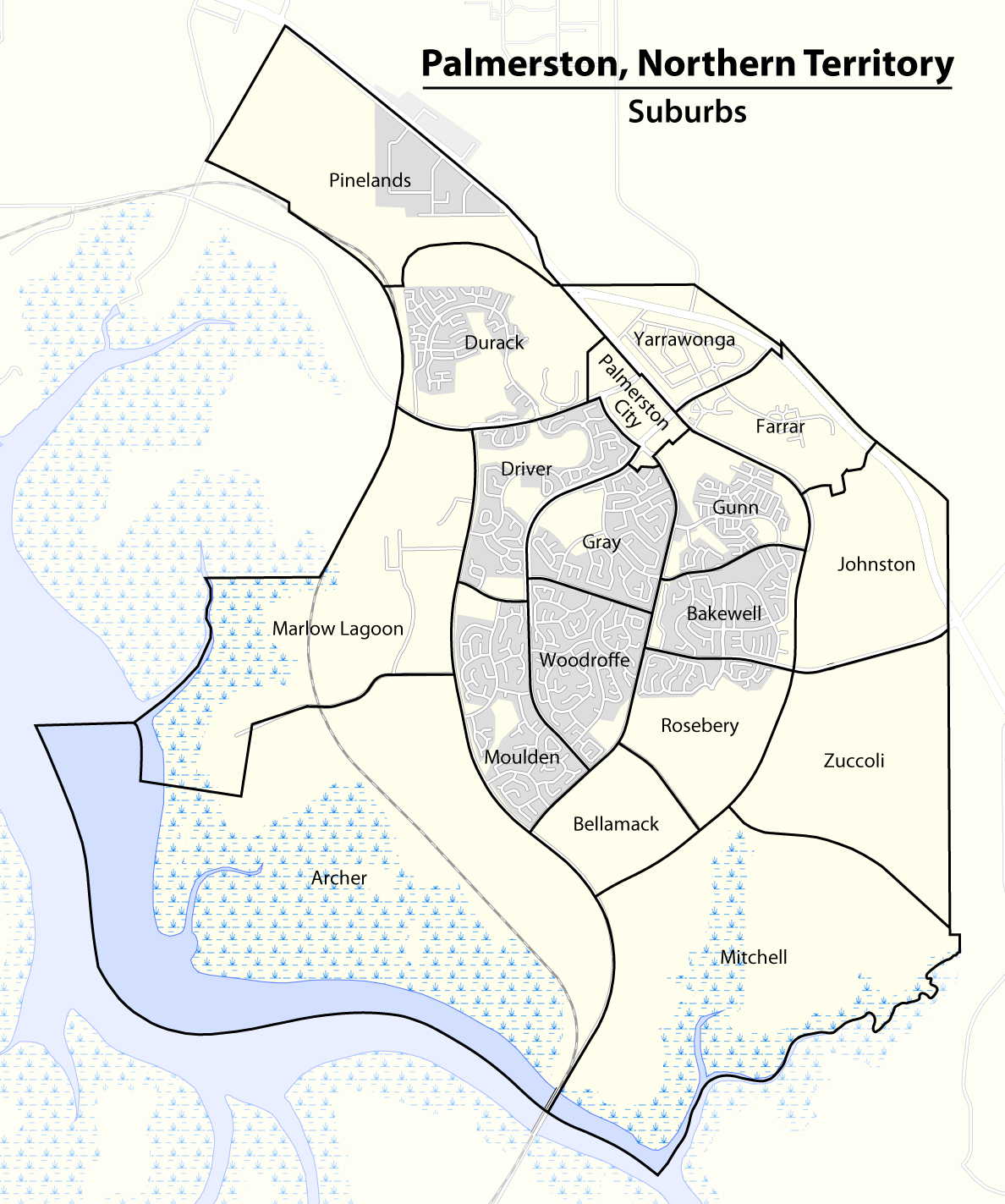
- Marlow in the west of the City of Palmerston

- Coordinates: 12°29′54″S 130°57′52″E
- Country: Australia
- State: Northern Territory
- City: Darwin
- LGA: City of Palmerston
- Location: 24.1 km (15.0 mi) from Darwin; 4.3 km (2.7 mi) from Palmerston
- Established: 1990s

Government
  - Territory electorate: Nelson
  - Federal division: Solomon

Population
  - Total: 721 (2016 census)
- Postcode: 0830
Suburbs around Marlow Lagoon
Tivendale	Durack	Durack
Elrundie; Archer	Marlow Lagoon	Driver; Moulden
Archer	Archer	Moulden

Marlow Lagoon is an outer western suburb of Palmerston 24 km SE of the Darwin CBD. Its local government area is the City of Palmerston. Marlow Lagoon is bounded to the west by the Adelaide-Darwin Railway, and to the east by Elrundie Ave. It is on the traditional Country and waterways of the Larrakia people.

The suburb is named after Joseph Marlow, a railway maintenance worker who had an interest in an agricultural lease (no. 213) spanning the nearby peninsula between Berrimah and Palmerston.
