= Town of Tennant Creek =

- Local government area
- Coordinates: 19°38′48″S 134°11′27″E
- Country: Australia
- State: Northern Territory
- Region: Barkly Tableland
- Established: 1978
- Abolished: 2008

Government
  - Federal division: Lingiari

Area
  - Total: 42.2 km^{2} (16.3 sq mi)

Population
  - Total: 4,873 (2006)
  - Density: 115.47/km^{2} (299.1/sq mi)
- Website: Town of Tennant Creek

The Town of Tennant Creek was a Local Government Area of the Northern Territory. The town council covered an area of 42.2 km^{2} and had a population of about 4,873.

The Tennant Creek Town Council consisted of the Mayor and three aldermen. It was not divided into wards.

== History ==
The Town of Tennant Creek was established in 1978, and its first elected council commenced in May 1978.

On 1 July 2008, the Town ceased to exist, and its area was merged into the Barkly Shire (now Region).

== See also ==
- Barkly Region
