= Driver, Northern Territory =

Driver Darwin, Northern Territory
- Coordinates: 12.485085°S 130.973005°E
- Population: 2,884 (2016 census)
  - Density: 1,677/km^{2} (4,343/sq mi)
- Established: 1990's
- Postcode(s): 0830
- Area: 1.72 km^{2} (0.7 sq mi)
- Location: 23.4 km (15 mi) from Darwin; 1.8 km (1 mi) from Palmerston
- LGA(s): City of Palmerston
- Territory electorate(s): Drysdale
- Federal division(s): Solomon
Suburbs around Driver:
Elrundle	Durack	Palmerston City
Marlow Lagoon	Driver	Gray
Marlow Lagoon	Moulden	Woodroffe

Driver is an inner-city suburb of Palmerston. It is 23 km SE of the Darwin CBD. Its Local Government Area is the City of Palmerston. Durack is bounded to the north by University Ave, to the west Elrundie Avenue, to the east Temple Terrace and to the south Tilston Avenue. The suburb is mostly composed of developments from the early 1980s.

== History ==
Driver was named after Arthur Driver, an engineer who came from Western Australia and was appointed by the Australian government as Administrator of the Northern Territory in 1946. The highlights of his five-year term include the rescue in 1947 of Bas Wie upon his stowaway arrival in Darwin from Indonesia and his term as the first President of the Legislative Council which begun in 1948. By this time, Driver had embarked on the decentralisation process of establishing Elliott as the focal point between Darwin and Alice Springs in the centre of the Territory.

Fry Court in Driver was named after Mr Charles Fry, a teamster who arrived with George Goyder's survey expedition in 1869 to found the colony of Port Darwin. His wife and family arrived with the first European women in January 1870. Fry drowned off the north Queensland coast when the SS Gothenburg sank in February 1875, after striking a section of the Great Barrier Reef in cyclonic conditions.
