= Woodroffe, Northern Territory =

Woodroffe Darwin, Northern Territory
- Coordinates: 12°29′58.34″S 130°58′51.60″E
- Population: 3,233 (2016 census)
  - Density: 2,020/km^{2} (5,230/sq mi)
- Established: 1980s
- Postcode(s): 0830
- Area: 1.6 km^{2} (0.6 sq mi)
- Location: 24.6 km (15 mi) from Darwin; 2.1 km (1 mi) from Palmerston
- LGA(s): City of Palmerston
- Territory electorate(s): Blain
- Federal division(s): Solomon
Suburbs around Woodroffe:
Driver	Gray	Bakewell
Moulden	Woodroffe	Rosebery
Moulden	Bellamack	Rosebery

Woodroffe is an inner-city suburb of Palmerston, located 2.1 km from Palmerston City and 25 kilometres southeast of the Darwin CBD. Its local government area is the City of Palmerston. It is on the traditional Country and waterways of the Larrakia people.

This suburb is named after George Woodroffe Goyder, Surveyor General of South Australia from 1861 to 1893. In 1868–69 Goyder was appointed by the South Australian Government to carry out a survey of land in the Northern Territory.
