= Durack, Northern Territory =

Durack Darwin, Northern Territory
- Coordinates: 12°28′30″S 130°58′23″E
- Population: 3,537 (2016 census)
  - Density: 1,194.9/km^{2} (3,095/sq mi)
- Established: 1990's
- Postcode(s): 0830
- Area: 2.96 km^{2} (1.1 sq mi)
- Location: 22.5 km (14 mi) from Darwin; 1.6 km (1 mi) from Palmerston
- LGA(s): City of Palmerston
- Territory electorate(s): Johnston
- Federal division(s): Solomon
Suburbs around Durack:
Pinelands	Pinelands	Holtze
Tivendale; Elrundie	Durack	Yarrawonga; Palmerston City
Elrundie	Marlow Lagoon; Palmerston City	Driver
- Footnotes: Adjoining suburbs

Durack is an inner-city suburb of Palmerston. It is 22 km southeast of the Darwin CBD. Its local government area is the City of Palmerston. It is located on the traditional Country and waterways of the Larrakia people.

Durack is bound to the north by the Stuart Highway; to the west and south is University Avenue, and to the east is Roystonea Avenue. The suburb consists mostly of recent developments, beginning in the early 1990s, and includes three estates as designated by the developers of the area: Fairway Waters, The Mews, and The Heights.

The Durack area was left unnamed when Palmerston was divided into suburbs, as the space was originally set aside for the use of a university in the area. When urban development of this area began in 1996, it became necessary to give the area a name. The suburb is named after the Durack family, who were pastoral pioneers of the Northern Territory and the Kimberleys.
