= Palmerston Shopping Centre =

- Location: Palmerston, Northern Territory, Australia
- Coordinates: 12.4805°S 130.9856°E
- Opened: 1980s
- Owner: Joondanna Investments
- Num. of stores: 60+
- Num. of anchor tenants: 2
- Floors: 1

Palmerston Shopping Centre is an Australian enclosed shopping centre located in the Central Business District of Palmerston, Northern Territory. The mall was developed in the 1980s by the La Pira family of Darwin through property firm Joondanna Investments who continue to operate it as of 2014.

The centre is anchored by a Coles supermarket and a Target department store, as well as specialty stores, eateries and shopfronts for Australia Post. The shopping centre's large underground car park is a designated emergency shelter, suitable for people with pets in the event of a cyclone weather event. In 2009, the Northern Territory Government announced that one of five new police shopfronts would be established within Palmerston Shopping Centre to help combat crime and anti-social behaviour in and around the centre. In January 2014 the centre drew criticism over the inadequacy of the parents room and baby changing facilities after the mall was named in a social media campaign demanding they be upgraded. The Shopping Centre's owners responded to the criticism when interviewed by the Northern Territory News, admitting the facilities were not up to standard and promising a renovation although not committing to a timeframe.
