= Elrundie =

- Suburb
- Coordinates: 12°29′21″S 130°56′23″E
- Country: Australia
- State: Northern Territory
- LGA: unincorporated area
- Location: 13 km (8.1 mi) E of Darwin City
- Established: 21 April 2004

Government
  - Territory electorate: Spillett
  - Federal division: Solomon

Population
  - Total: 0 (2016 census)
- Time zone: UTC+9:30 (ACST)
- Postcode: 0822
- Mean max temp: 32.0 °C (89.6 °F)
- Mean min temp: 23.2 °C (73.8 °F)
- Annual rainfall: 1,725.1 mm (67.92 in)
Suburbs around Elrundie
East Arm	East Arm; Tivendale; Durack	Durack
East Arm	Elrundie	Durack; Marlow Lagoon
Wickham	Wickham; Archer; Marlow Lagoon	Marlow Lagoon
- Locations; Adjoining suburbs

Elrundie is a suburb in the Northern Territory of Australia located in Darwin about 13 kilometres (8.1 mi) east of Darwin City overlooking a part of Darwin Harbour known as the East Arm.

Elrundie consists of land associated with a peninsula known as the Elrundie Peninsula and part of the channels of the following waterbodies that bound the peninsula's coastline: the Hudson Creek to the north-west, the Elizabeth River to the south-west and the Myrmidon Creek to the south-east.

The name is derived from Elrundie Flat, a name which is considered to be of Aboriginal origin and which was first used in 1869 in a document prepared by A.J. Mitchell, a member of the Goyder expedition to the Northern Territory. The suburb's boundary and name were gazetted on 21 April 2004.

The 2016 Australian census which was conducted in August 2016 reports that Elrundie had no people living within its boundaries.

Elrundie is located within the federal division of Solomon, the territory electoral division of Spillett and part of the unincorporated areas of the Northern Territory.

== See also ==
- List of Darwin suburbs
