= Gray, Northern Territory =

Gray Palmerston, Northern Territory
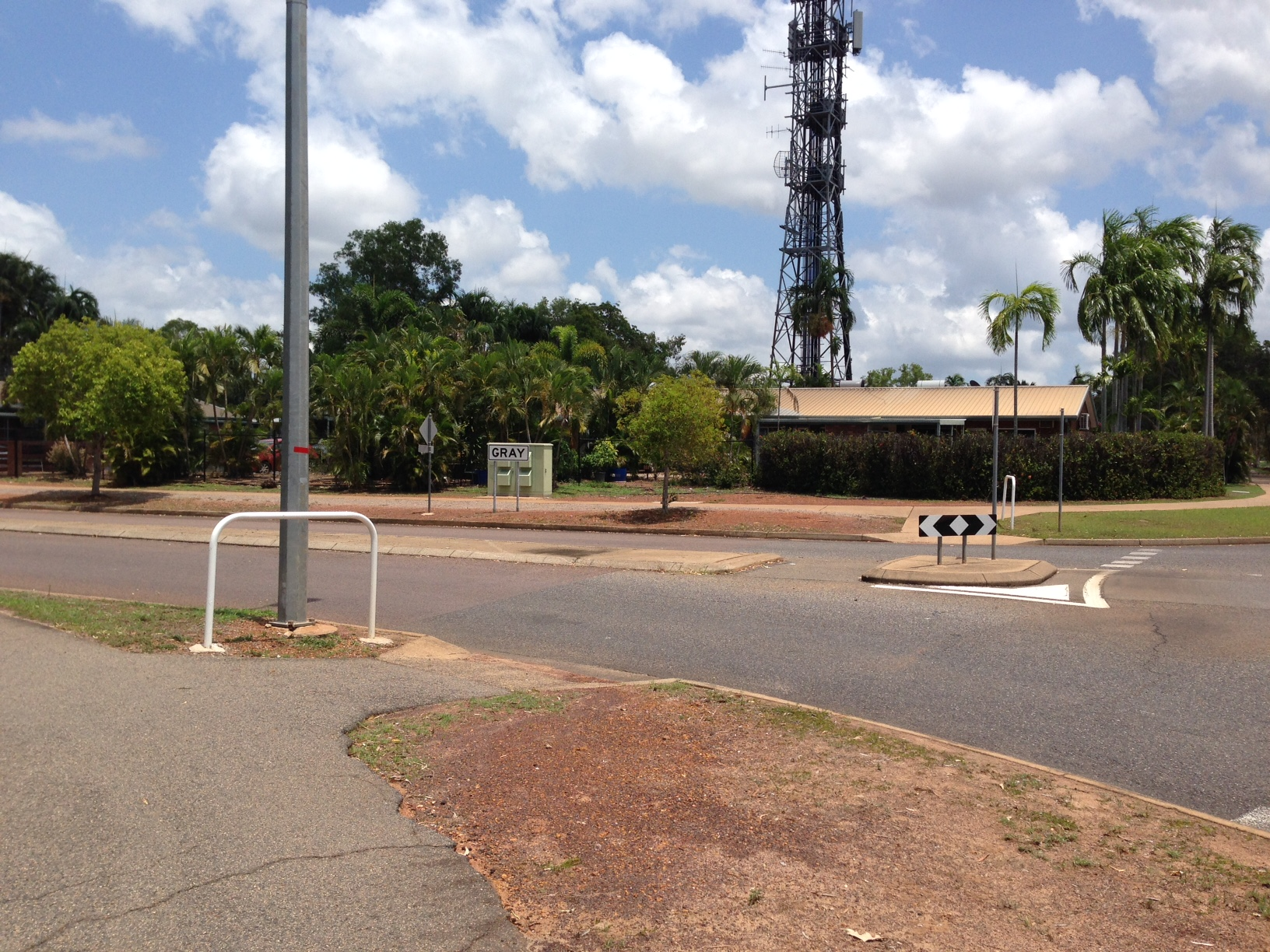

- Coordinates: 12°29′32″S 130°58′44″E
- Population: 3,288 (2016 census)
  - Density: 2,177/km^{2} (5,640/sq mi)
- Established: 1970s
- Postcode(s): 0830
- Area: 1.51 km^{2} (0.6 sq mi)
- Location: 23.3 km (14 mi) from Darwin; 1.8 km (1 mi) from Palmerston
- LGA(s): City of Palmerston
- Territory electorate(s): Drysdale
- Federal division(s): Solomon
Suburbs around Gray:
Driver	Palmerston City	Gunn
Driver	Gray	Gunn
Moulden	Woodroffe	Bakewell

Gray is an inner-city suburb of Palmerston. It is 23 km southeast of the Darwin CBD. It is located on the traditional Country and waterways of the Larrakia people.

Its local government area is the City of Palmerston, and it is bounded to the north and west by Temple Terrace, to the east is Chung Wah Terrace, and to the south and east is Emery Avenue.

Gray is named after William Henry Gray who was born in London in 1808 arriving in Adelaide in 1836, following an interest in the scheme of colonising South Australia in 1834. He came to Palmerston in 1870, acquiring land not long after its founding.
