= Yarrawonga, Northern Territory =

Suburb of Darwin, the Northern Territory, Australia

Yarrawonga Darwin, Northern Territory
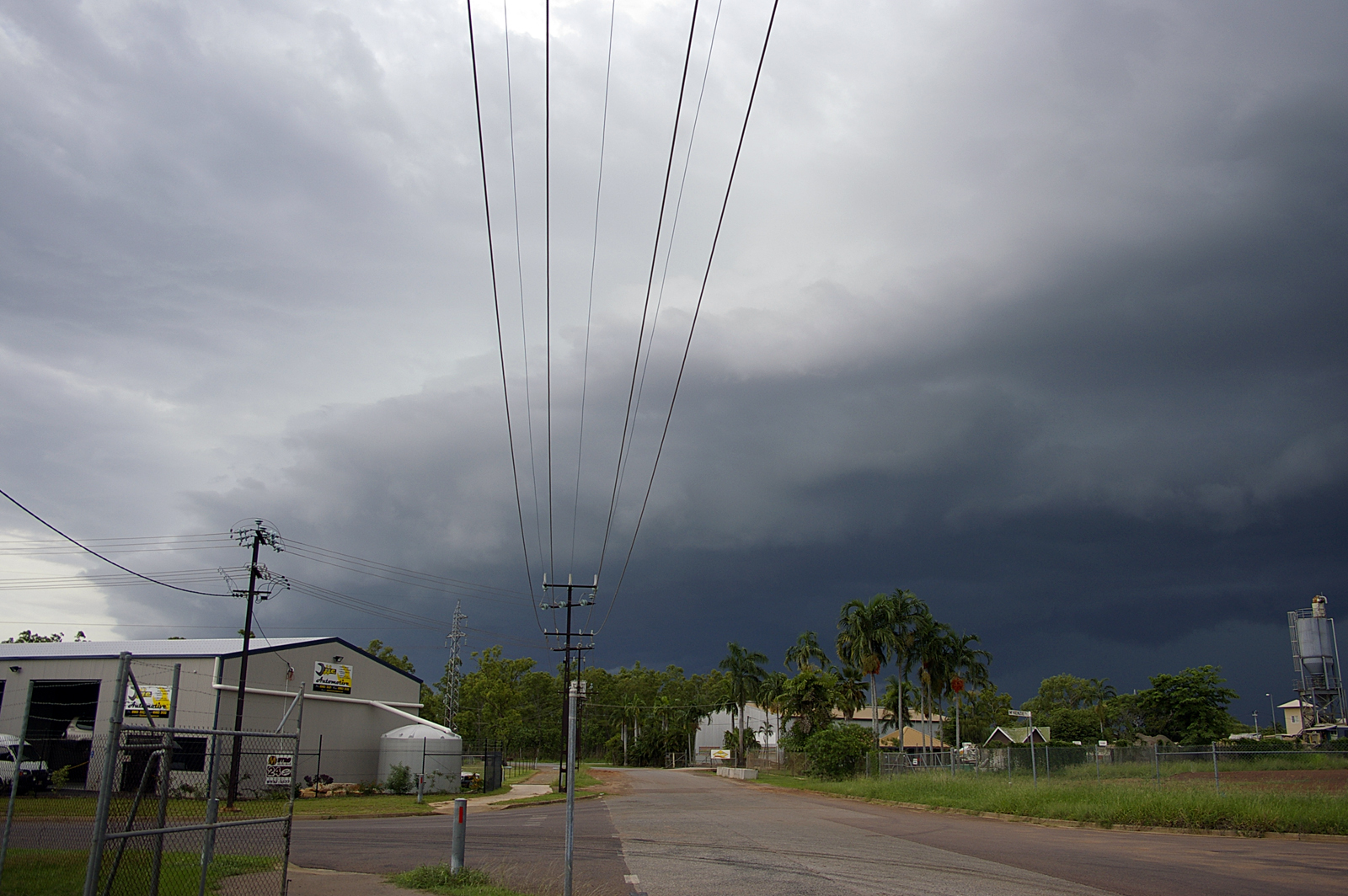

- Coordinates: 12.471085°S 130.990115°E
- Population: 32 (2016 census)
- Established: 1980s
- Postcode(s): 0830
- Location: 20.9 km (13 mi) from Darwin City; 2.1 km (1 mi) from Palmerston
- LGA(s): City of Palmerston
- Territory electorate(s): Drysdale
- Federal division(s): Lingiari
Suburbs around Yarrawonga:
Holtze; Pinelands	Holtze	Holtze
Durack; Palmerston City	Yarrawonga	Holtze; Farrar
Palmerston City	Palmerston City; Farrar	Farrar
- Footnotes: Adjoining suburbs

Yarrawonga is an outer northern suburb of Palmerston. It is on the traditional Country and waterways of the Larrakia people.

It is 21 km SE of the Darwin City and 2.1 km from Palmerston City. Its Local Government Area is the City of Palmerston.

Yarrawonga is named after the Yarrawonga Zoo which was established in the area in 1965.

It is believed that the name came from the Victorian town of Yarrawonga in the northern part of the state.

The area is one of Palmerston's Industrial Suburbs, along with Pinelands.
