= Gunn, Northern Territory =

Gunn Palmerston, Northern Territory
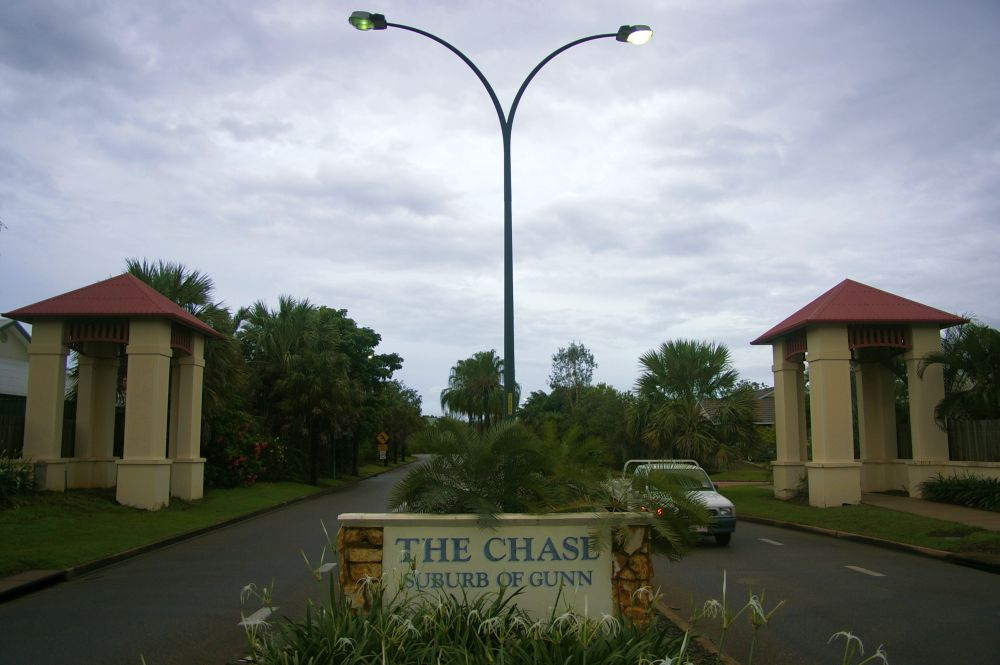

- Coordinates: 12°29′19″S 130°59′29″E
- Population: 2,664 (2016 census)
  - Density: 1,330/km^{2} (3,450/sq mi)
- Established: 2000s
- Postcode(s): 0832
- Area: 2.0 km^{2} (0.8 sq mi)
- Location: 23.1 km (14 mi) from Darwin; 1.6 km (1 mi) from Palmerston
- LGA(s): City of Palmerston
- Territory electorate(s): Drysdale
- Federal division(s): Solomon
Suburbs around Gunn:
City of Palmerston	Farrar	Farrar
Gray	Gunn	Johnston
Gray	Bakewell	Johnston

Gunn is an inner-city suburb of Palmerston, Northern Territory, Australia. It is 23 km southeast of the Darwin CBD. Its local government area is the City of Palmerston. It is located on the traditional Country and waterways of the Larrakia people.

Gunn is bounded to the north by the Temple Tce and Roystonea Ave, to the west is Chung Wah Terrace, and to the south is Lambrick Ave and East is Roystonea Ave . The suburb is mostly composed of developments from the 2000s to 2010s after Cyclone Tracy struck Darwin in 1974.

The suburb of Gunn is named after Mrs Jeannie Gunn, born in Carlton, Melbourne as Jeannie Taylor in June 1870. Miss Jeannie Taylor met Aeneas Gunn. The Gunns came to Port Darwin on the SS Guthrie Aeneas Gunn had previously been to the Northern Territory in 1890.

== Transport ==
Gunn's "main street" is Lakeview Boulevard, running from Roystonea Avenue to Chung Wah Terrace. It is entirely a two-lane road, with one roundabout. Roystonea Avenue forms the southern boundary of Gunn, with three roundabouts in Gunn. It runs from Highway 1 to Temple Terrace in Gray.
