= Moulden, Northern Territory =

Moulden Palmerston, Northern Territory
- Coordinates: 12°30′36″S 130°58′34″E
- Population: 2,959 (2016 census)
  - Density: 1,681/km^{2} (4,354/sq mi)
- Established: 1980's
- Postcode(s): 0830
- Area: 1.76 km^{2} (0.7 sq mi)
- Location: 25.6 km (16 mi) from Darwin City; 4.1 km (3 mi) from Palmerston City
- LGA(s): City of Palmerston
- Territory electorate(s): Blain
- Federal division(s): Solomon
Suburbs around Moulden:
| Marlow Lagoon | Driver | Gray |
| | Moulden | Woodroffe |
| | Mitchell | Mitchell |

Moulden is an outer-city suburb of Palmerston, Australia. It is 24.9 kilometres (15.5 mi) southeast of the Darwin CBD by road, about 16 kilometres (9.9 mi) as the crow flies. Its local government area is the City of Palmerston. It is on the traditional Country and waterways of the Larrakia people.

Moulden is bounded by Tilston Avenue in the north, Temple Terrace in the east, to the south is Chung Wah Terrace and Elrundie Avenue in the west.

Moulden is named after Beaumont Arnold Moulden, who was a representative in the Legislative Council of South Australia, who co-acquired land in the area in 1871.
