= Elizabeth River (Northern Territory) =

Elizabeth
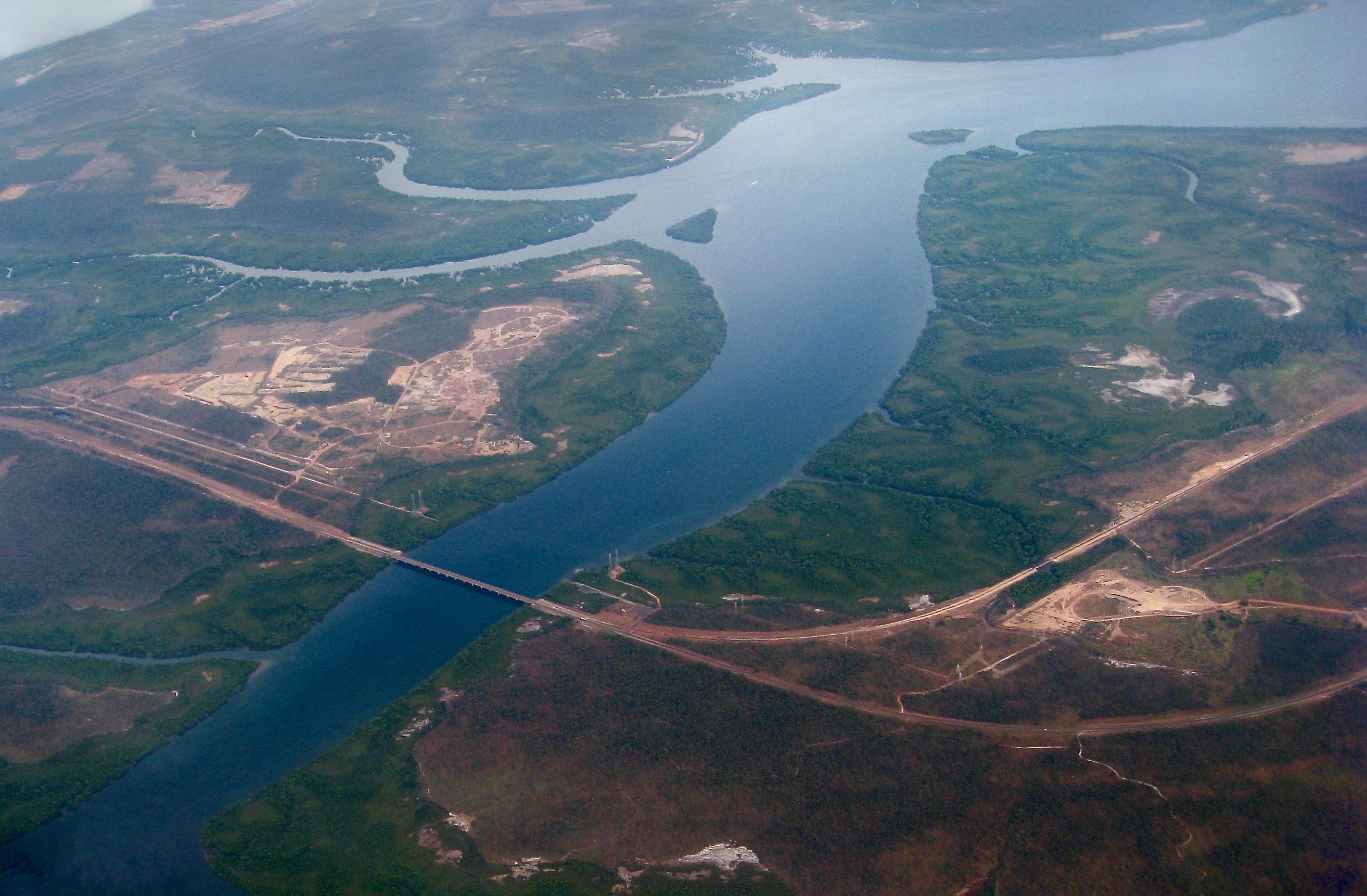
- The Elizabeth River Bridge across Elizabeth River, upstream of the East Arm of Darwin Harbour

- Location of the Elizabeth River mouth in the Northern Territory

Location
- Country: Australia
- Territory: Northern Territory

Physical characteristics
- Source
  - location: Noonamah, Northern Territory, Australia
  - elevation: 35 m (115 ft)
- Mouth
  - location: East Arm, Australia
  - coordinates: 12°32′31″S 130°58′55″E
  - elevation: 0 m (0 ft)
- Length: 28 km (17 mi)

Elizabeth River flows into Darwin Harbour close to Darwin in the Northern Territory of Australia. It is a traditional waterway of the Larrakia people.

== Course ==
The headwaters of the river rise south of Noonamah and flow in a northwesterly direction and cross the Stuart Highway south of Humpty Doo. It continues through an estuarine area and discharges into the East Arm of Darwin Harbour, then into Beagle Gulf, and eventually into the Timor Sea.

The river shares a catchment area with the Finniss and Howard Rivers; the combined watershed occupies an area of 8,672 square kilometres (3,348 sq mi).

== Climate ==
The climate of the Elizabeth River region is monsoon tropical with two distinct seasons: dry and wet. The dry season lasts for six months between April and September with an average rainfall of 24 mm, whereas the wet season lasts between October and March with an average monthly rainfall of 254 mm per month. The majority of the rain falls between December and April. Runoff varies between 250–1000 mm.

Peak flow for the Elizabeth River occurs in February with 389 ML per day, after which it slowly decreases until July, when there is no freshwater input into Darwin Harbour until the onset of the following wet season. Cyclone frequency is low to moderate.

The Finniss, Elizabeth and Howard Rivers have a mean annual outflow of 3,000 gigalitres (3.924×10^{9} cu yd),

== Water quality ==
The water quality was excellent at the upper estuary monitoring sites of the Northern Territory Government in 2011. Water quality at the freshwater monitoring sites was very good in 2011.

== Geology ==
The underlying lithology is dominated by Permian siltstones and sandstones.

== See also ==
- List of rivers of Australia § Northern Territory
- Elizabeth River Bridge
