= Palmerston, Northern Territory =

Town in Australia

Palmerston
- City
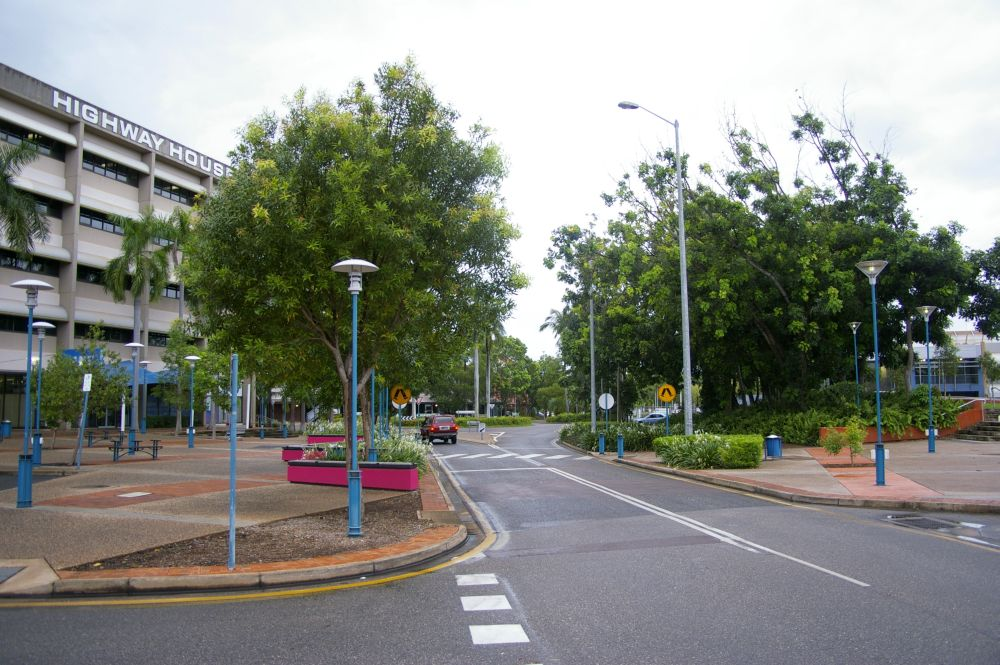
- Palmerston central business district

- Coordinates: 12°28′50″S 130°58′59″E
- Country: Australia
- State: Northern Territory
- LGA: City of Palmerston
- Location: 21 km (13 mi) from Darwin; 297 km (185 mi) from Katherine; 1,478 km (918 mi) from Alice Springs
- Established: 1981

Government
  - Territory electorates: Blain; Brennan; Drysdale; Spillett; Nelson
  - Federal divisions: Lingiari; Solomon

Area
  - Total: 52.9 km^{2} (20.4 sq mi)

Population
  - Total: 37,247 (2021 census)
  - Density: 9.1/km^{2} (24/sq mi)
- Time zone: UTC+9:30 (ACST)
- Postcode: 0830

Palmerston is a satellite city of Darwin, the capital and largest city of Australia's Northern Territory. The city is situated approximately 20 kilometres from the Darwin central business district and 10 kilometres from Howard Springs and the surrounding rural areas. Palmerston had a population of 33,695 at the 2016 census, making it the second largest city in the Northern Territory. According to the 2021 census, the population grew to 37,247 people.

There are eighteen suburbs in Palmerston, ten of which are close to the Palmerston city centre. Palmerston is mostly residential with two light industrial areas in the north of the city.

== History ==
=== 1864–1911 ===
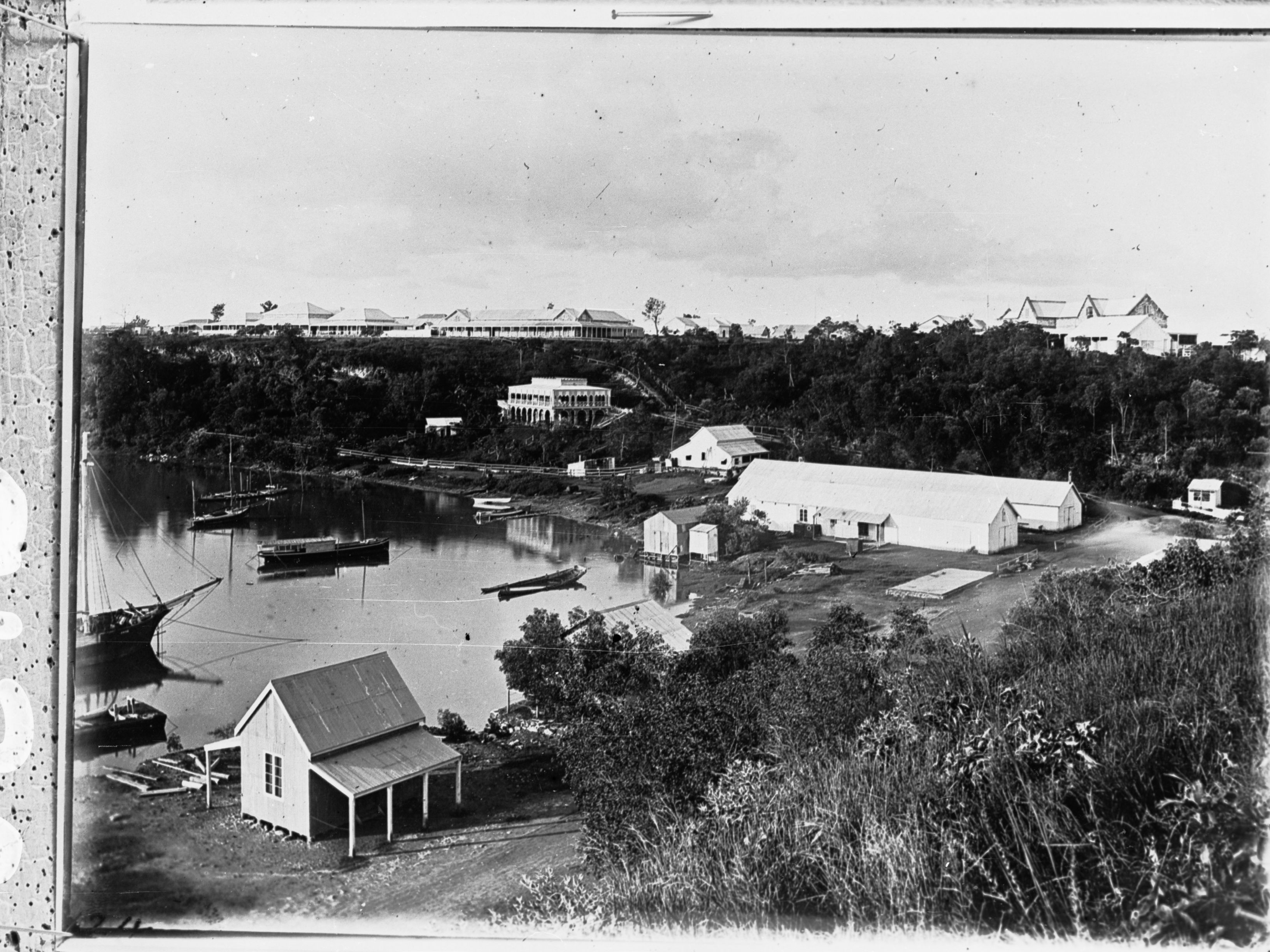
Palmerston from Fort Hill, 1905

Palmerston was the name chosen in 1864 for the capital of the Northern Territory by the Government of South Australia, which was then responsible for its administration, in recognition of the 3rd Viscount Palmerston, who became Prime Minister of the United Kingdom of Great Britain and Ireland in 1855. The first site, as chosen by Boyle Travers Finniss at Escape Cliffs near the mouth of the Adelaide River, on the coast of Adam Bay on the western side of the Cape Hotham peninsula in 1864, was abandoned in 1867 and a second laid out by Surveyor-General George Goyder near Port Darwin in 1869. The town was officially renamed Darwin in April 1911, after responsibility for the Northern Territory passed to the Commonwealth of Australia and it was officially gazetted as the City of Darwin in 1959.

=== 1971–present ===
The land for a new satellite city of Darwin was acquired in 1971 by the Federal Government after concerns of under-supply of residential land in Darwin. The site was selected as the land was adjacent to existing transportation corridors. The decision to proceed with the development was made in 1980 and for the third time, the name of Palmerston was selected for the new city. Planning and development was managed by the Palmerston Development Authority.

Development of Palmerston began during the early 1980s. Suburbs of Palmerston were built in stages. The first suburbs built were Gray and Driver, followed by Moulden, then Woodroffe and Marlow Lagoon. The urban area continued to grow throughout the 1990s, with the new suburbs of Bakewell, Rosebery and Durack. The population growth of Palmerston continues to be the highest in the Northern Territory.

The population increased by almost 8,000 people between 1991 and 2001 to a total of 21,000 people. Palmerston's population growth is expected to continue and reach over 40,000 people by 2023.

In 1995/1996 the construction commenced on 5 new Palmerston suburbs, Rosebery, Bakewell, Durack, Gunn, and Farrar. These were developed in stages. In 2000 the Palmerston Town Council sought and obtained a change in the name of the municipality to City of Palmerston.

Since then, other suburbs have been registered and remain in various stages of development, including Archer (2001), Bellamack (2001), Johnston (2007), Zuccoli (2007) and Mitchell (2007).

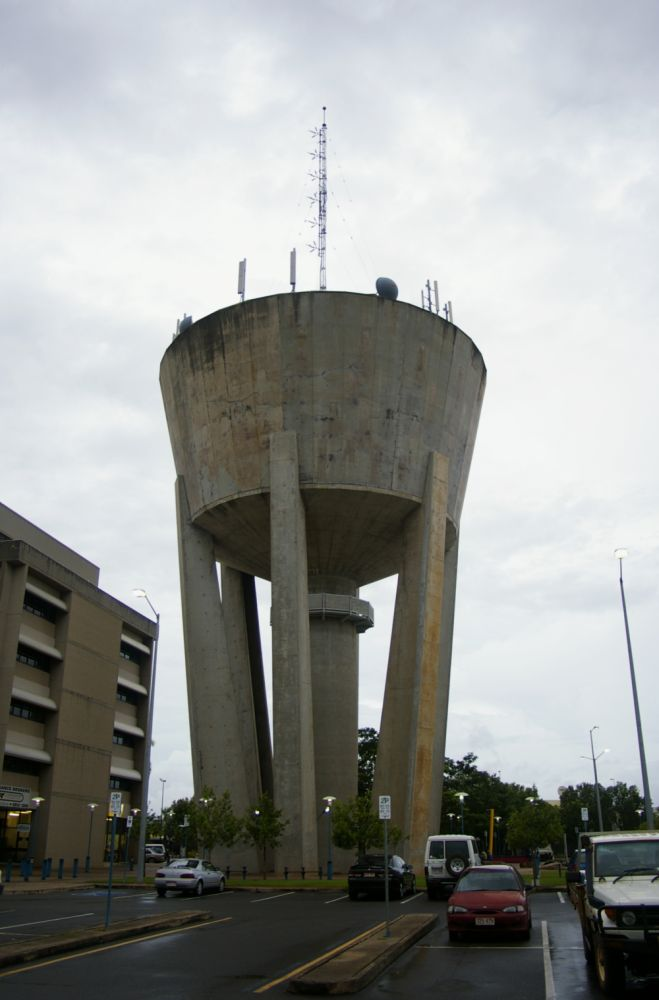
Palmerston Water Tank

== Landmarks ==
The major landmark in Palmerston is the PowerWater's water storage tank, which supplies the city with fresh potable water. Formerly, the city had a large escarpment in the heart of the city, with extensive walking paths and a small creek, but the area has since been converted into an open grassy area; the community space known as Goyder Square.

== Geography ==
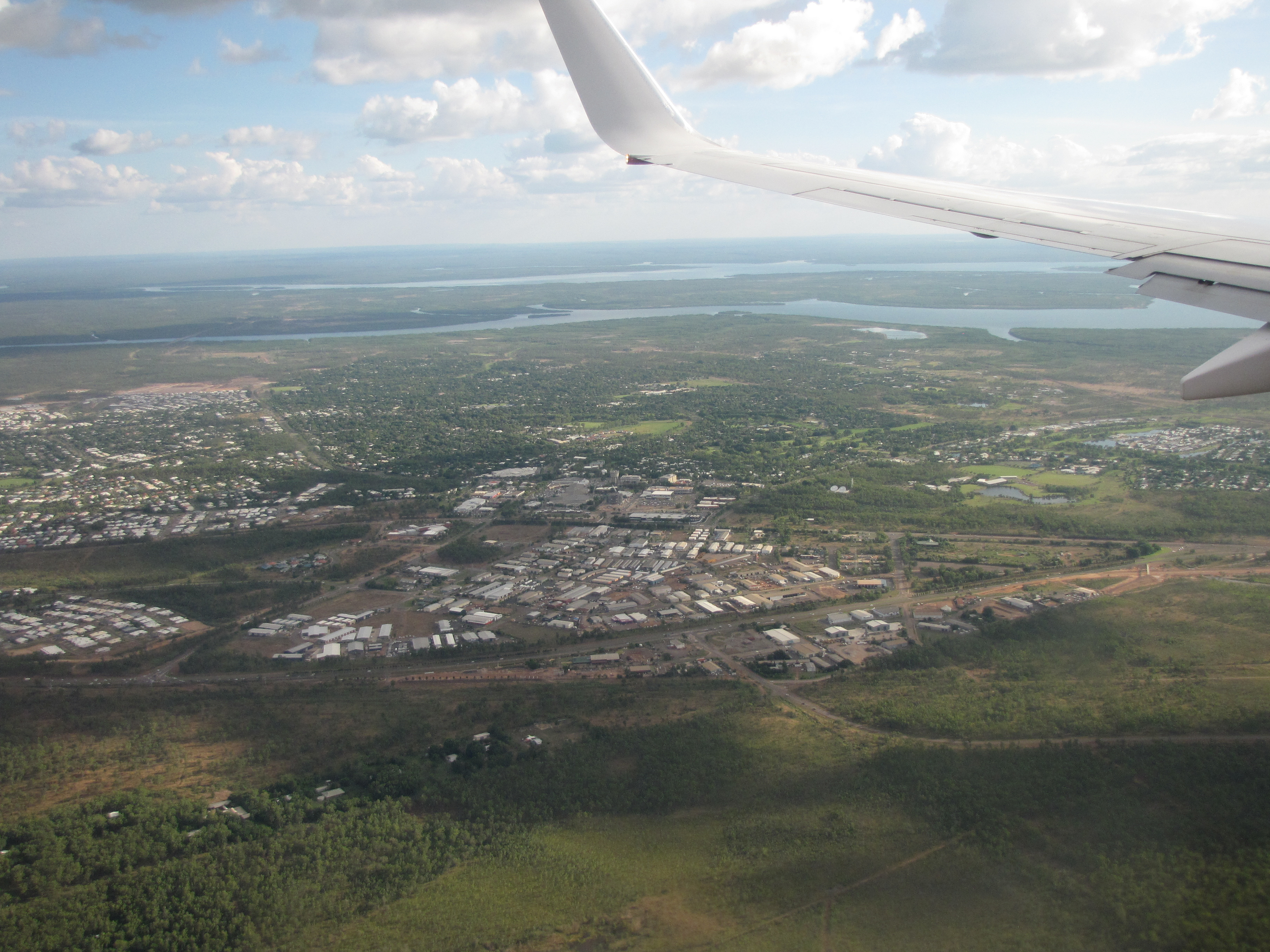
An aerial view of Palmerston and its surrounds

Palmerston is located between the outer industrial areas of Darwin and the rural areas of Howard Springs, 20 kilometres (13 mi) southeast of Darwin, and is situated in the local government area of the City of Palmerston.

The urban area of Palmerston extends from the Stuart Highway in the north and east and the East Arm inlet to the west and south.

=== Regions and suburbs ===
The City of Palmerston initially consisted of the Palmerston Town (CBD), as well as suburbs of Driver and Gray. These were followed by Moulden and Woodroffe after development in those areas commenced in 1983. Also included in the City of Palmerston are the semi-rural suburb of Marlow Lagoon, the suburb of Archer and the industrial zones of Yarrawonga and Pinelands. Further developments have occurred leading to the creation of the suburbs of Rosebery, Bakewell, Gunn, Durack and more recently Farrar, Bellamack, Johnston, Zuccoli and Mitchell. The newer suburbs are located on the south-east side of the existing city.

=== Climate ===
Palmerston has a tropical savannah climate (Aw) like Darwin with distinct wet and dry seasons. The dry season runs from May to September. In the coolest months of June and July, daily temperature range is 19 to 35 °C. The wet season is associated with tropical cyclones and monsoon rains. The majority of rainfall occurs between December and March when thunderstorms are common and humidity is regularly over 80 per cent.

Source: Averages for Darwin Airport, 1941–2007, Bureau of Meteorology
Month	Jan	Feb	Mar	Apr	May	Jun	Jul	Aug	Sep	Oct	Nov	Dec	Year
Temperatures (°C)													
Mean daily maximum	31.8	31.4	31.9	32.7	32.0	30.6	30.5	31.3	32.5	33.2	33.2	32.6	32.0
Highest recorded maximum	35.6 (4th 1985)	36.0 (20th 1972)	36.0 (13th 1942)	36.7 (16th 2003)	36.0 (2nd 1942)	34.5 (5th 2003)	34.8 (8th 1998)	36.0 (26th 1998)	37.7 (17th 1983)	38.9 (18th 1982)	37.3 (28th 2004)	37.0 (18th 1976)	
Lowest recorded maximum	25.7 (29th 1989)	25.6 (3rd 1956)	25.7 (22nd 1960)	24.6 (10th 1954)	22.7 (20th 1981)	22.7 (20th 2007)	21.1 (14th 1968)	25.1 (17th 2007)	27.6 (29th 1986)	24.7 (20th 2000)	26.2 (19th 1981)	24.0 (17th 1954)	
Mean daily minimum	24.8	24.7	24.5	24.0	22.1	19.9	19.3	20.4	23.0	25.0	25.3	25.3	23.2
Highest recorded minimum	29.3 (28th 2002)	29.4 (3rd 1988)	28.3 (3rd 1958)	26.6 (12th 1992)	25.6 (12th 2001)	25.1 (9th 1979)	25.6 (13th 1981)	26.7 (27th 1998)	28.8 (23rd 2005)	29.7 (25th 1987)	29.7 (3rd 2007)	29.8 (21st 1984)	
Lowest recorded minimum	20.2 (23rd 1985)	17.2 (25th 1949)	19.2 (31st 1945)	16.0 (11th 1943)	13.8 (27th 1990)	12.1 (23rd 1963)	10.4 (29th 1942)	13.2 (2nd 1990)	14.3 (1st 2006)	19.0 (20th 2000)	19.3 (4th 1950)	19.8 (4th 1974)	
Precipitation (millimetres)													
Mean total rainfall	420.4	362.7	323.8	100.3	20.7	2.0	1.3	5.4	15.3	68.5	140.4	246.2	1714.7
Highest recorded total	940.4 (1995)	814.5 (1969)	1013.6 (1977)	396.2 (2006)	298.9 (1968)	50.6 (2004)	26.6 (2001)	83.8 (1947)	129.8 (1981)	338.7 (1954)	370.8 (1964)	664.5 (1974)	2776.6 (1998)
Lowest recorded total	136.1 (1965)	103.3 (1959)	88.0 (1978)	0.6 (1997)	0.0 (2003)	0.0 (2006)	0.0 (2007)	0.0 (2006)	0.0 (2001)	0.0 (1953)	17.2 (1976)	18.8 (1991)	1024.7 (1946)
Highest daily rainfall	290.4 (3rd 1997)	250.2 (18th 1955)	240.6 (16th 1977)	142.7 (4th 1959)	89.6 (18th 1987)	46.8 (2nd 2004)	19.2 (17th 2001)	80.0 (22nd 1947)	70.6 (21st 1942)	95.5 (25th 1969)	96.8 (26th 1992)	277.0 (25th 1974)	
Notes: Temperatures are in degrees Celsius. Precipitation is in millimetres. Darwin Airport Latitude: −12.42° S Longitude: 130.89° E Elevation: 30 m ASL

== Demographics ==
Historical population
Year	Pop.	±%
1986	5,706	—
1991	7,804	+36.8%
1996	12,750	+63.4%
2001	20,788	+63.0%
2006	23,614	+13.6%
2011	27,618	+17.0%
2014	33,900	+22.7%
Source: City of Palmerston

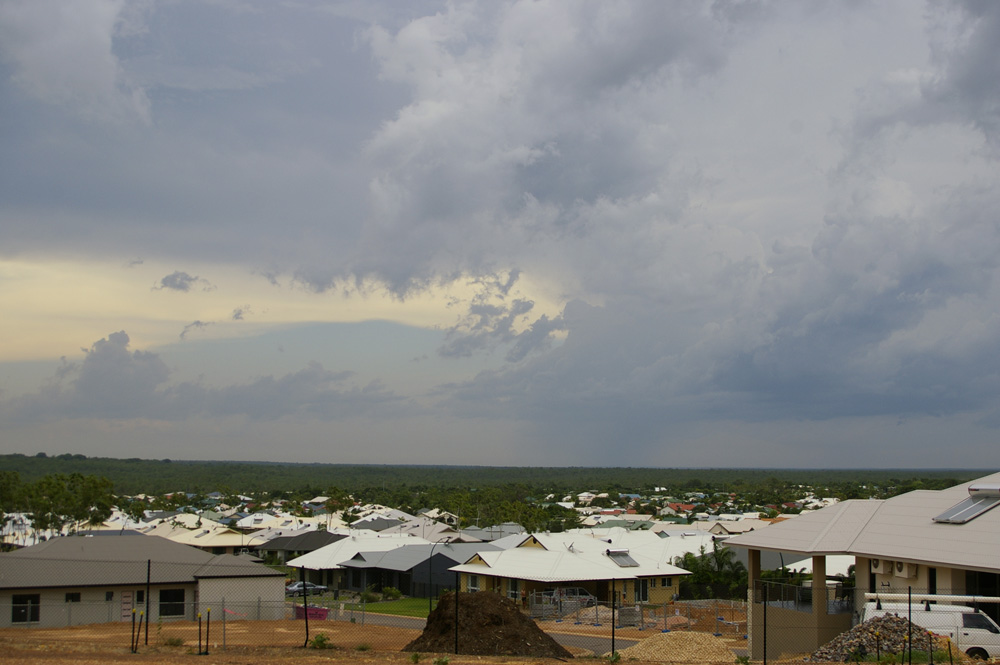
Looking over the suburb of Farrar

As of the 2016 Census, there were 33,695 people in Palmerston. The median age of persons in Palmerston was 28 years. 18.9% of the population of Palmerston were children aged between 5–14 years, and 47.1% were persons aged 25–54 years. 74.8 per cent of Palmerston's population are Australian born; the biggest overseas birthplaces were England (692 or 2.9 per cent), New Zealand (437 or 1.9 per cent), the Philippines (278 or 1.2 per cent), Papua New Guinea (144 or 0.6 per cent) and East Timor (116 or 0.5 per cent).

The 2006 Census found the most inhabitants in Palmerston practice 'no religion' (6,106 or 25.9 per cent), Catholicism (5,263 or 22.3 per cent), Anglican (3,561 or 15.1 per cent), Uniting Church (1,205 or 5.1 per cent) and Presbyterian and Reformed (419 or 1.8 per cent).

Palmerston's population represents one quarter of the combined Palmerston-Darwin total population, and represents 11.7% of the Northern Territory's population.

=== Population growth ===
Palmerston is one of the fastest-growing cities in Australia. Palmerston recorded the fastest increase of population of all the local government areas in the Northern Territory. Palmerston increased by 1,300 people, growing by 5 per cent. The fastest growth occurred within Palmerston which includes the suburbs of Farrar, Rosebery, Marlow Lagoon and Gunn and Palmerston City.

== Government ==
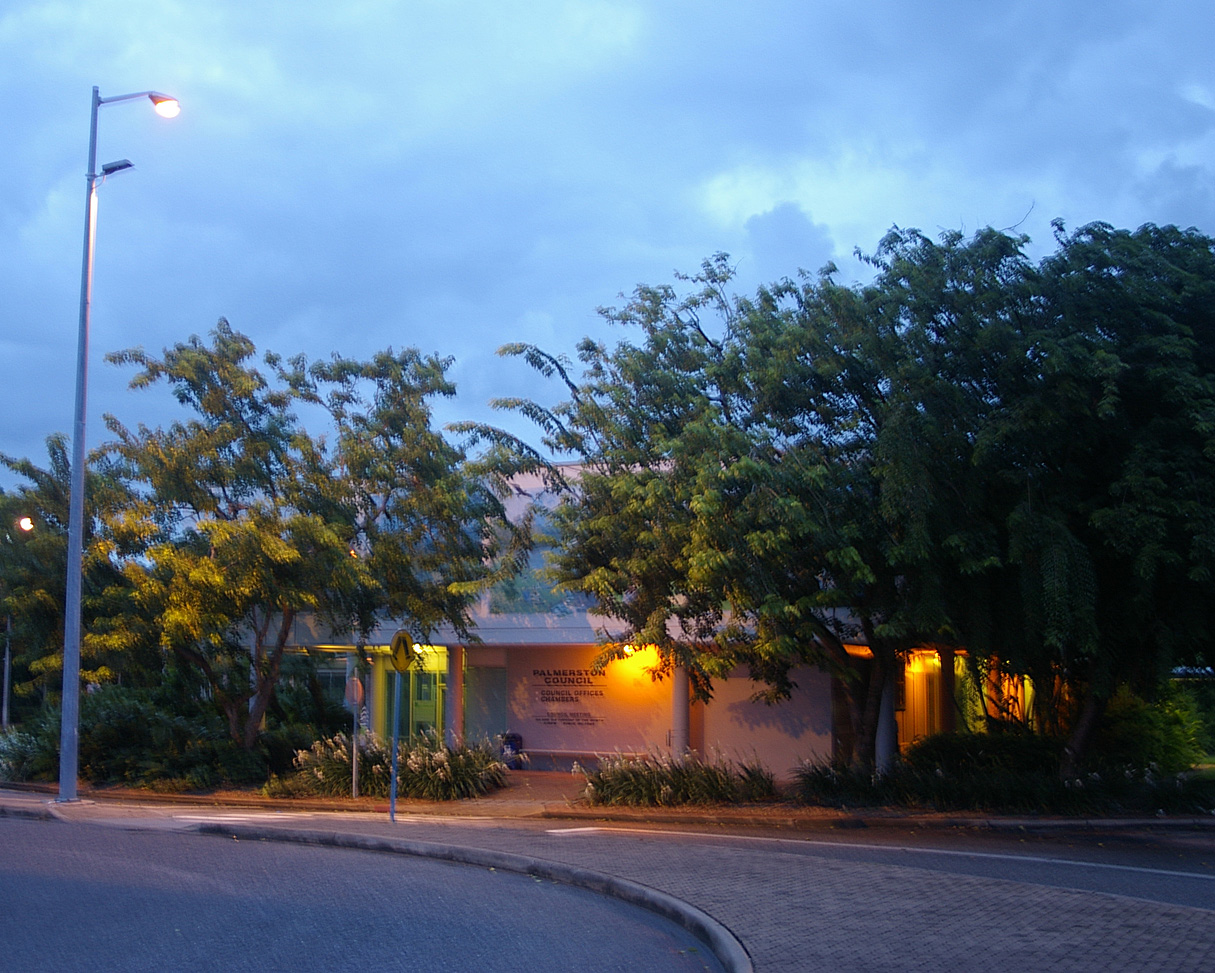
Palmerston Council Chambers

The Palmerston region is covered by the Local Government Area of the City of Palmerston. The council was created in 1985. The council chambers are located in the Palmerston City Centre.

The Palmerston City Council (Incorporated under the Northern Territory Local Government Act 1993) governs the City of Palmerston which takes in the CBD and the suburbs. The City of Palmerston has governed Palmerston since 1985. It is governed by a seven-member council comprising the mayor, deputy mayor and five aldermen. Unlike Darwin, the city is not divided into wards and all councillors are elected at-large. The current mayor of Palmerston is Athina Pascoe-Bell, who was elected in the local government election on 24 March 2018.

In territory politics, Palmerston is split between five Legislative Assembly districts. The districts of Blain, Brennan and Drysdale are entirely within the city. The district of Spillett is located mostly within Palmerston, but its area reaches up to eastern Darwin. The mostly rural district of Nelson spills into the city. Historically, Palmerston has been a bastion of conservatism, with Country Liberal Party candidates usually winning by wide margins. Labor never came remotely close to winning seats in Palmerston until 2005, when that year's massive Labor landslide saw Labor take Brennan and Drysdale off the CLP. However, those seats reverted to form in the 2008 election.

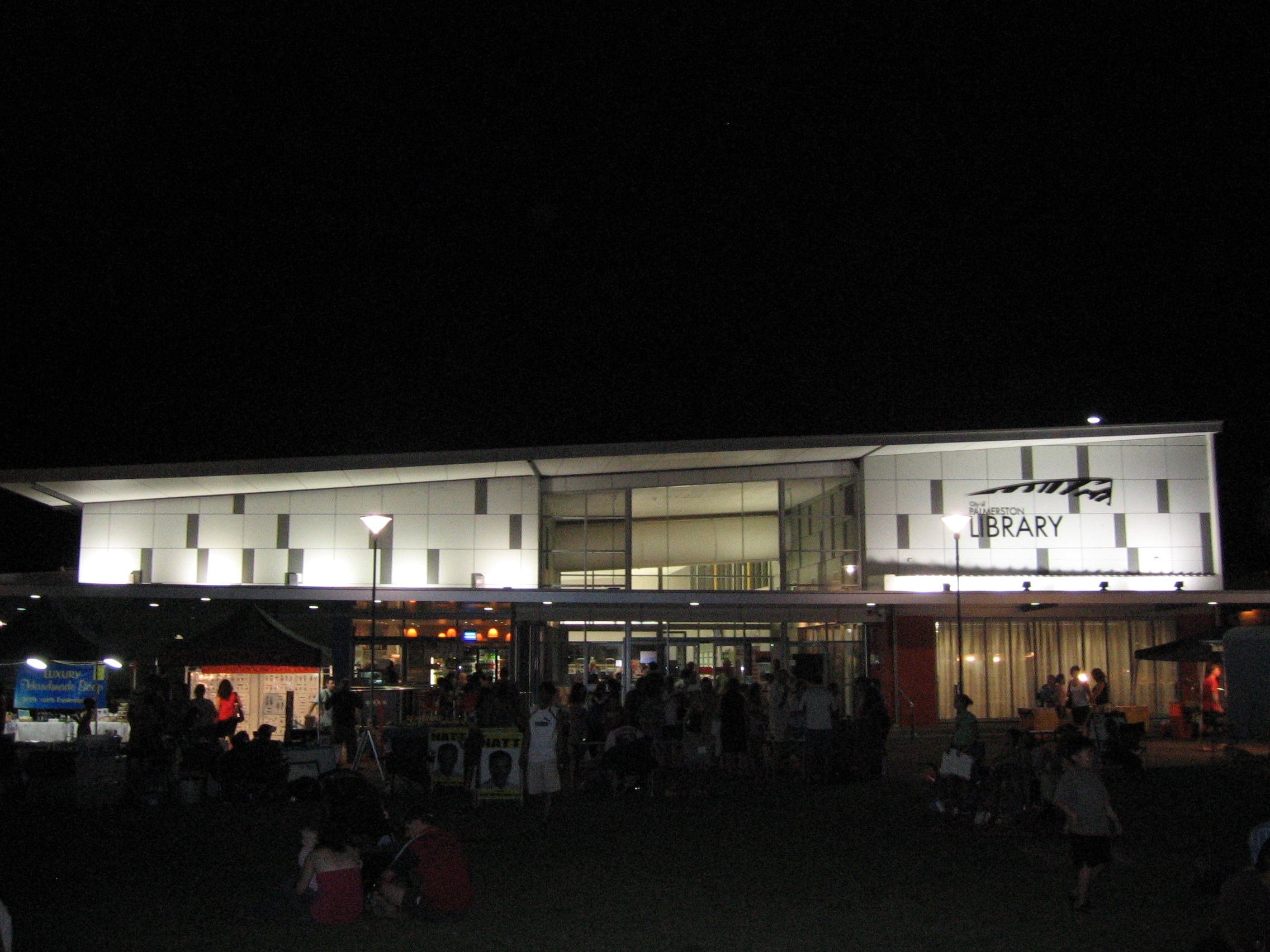
Palmerston library by night. The Palmerston markets can be seen in the foreground.

At the 2016 general election, however, Labor took Brennan and Drysdale off the CLP, while Blain fell to then-independent Terry Mills, a former CLP Chief Minister. The CLP, however, gained victories in Brennan and Nelson, while Labor retained Drysdale and Mills lost his seat of Blain to Labor's Mark Turner at the 2020 election. Currently, Palmerston is represented by two Labor members and two CLP members.

In federal politics, most of Palmerston's suburbs are located in the House of Representatives division shared with Darwin – the Division of Solomon, with the remaining suburbs in the city's outskirts located within the Division of Lingiari. The MP from 2010 to 2016, and the current Administrator of the Australian Indian Ocean Territories, Natasha Griggs, was a Palmerston resident and a former member of Palmerston City Council. The current members for the Division of Solomon and Lingiari are Labor members Luke Gosling and Warren Snowdon, respectively.

== Economy ==
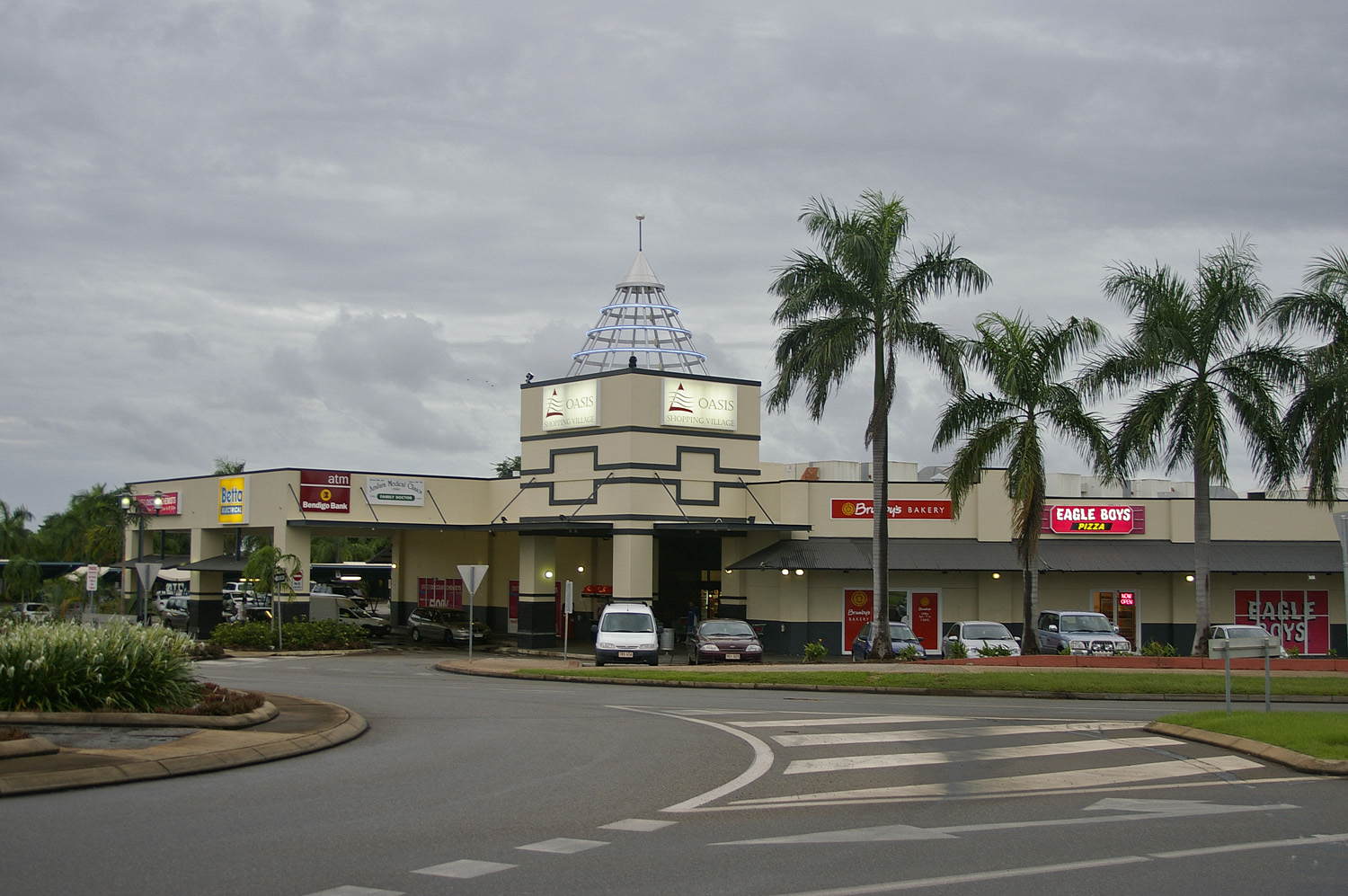
Oasis Shopping Centre

Palmerston has around 19,800 people in the labour force. In March 2017, the unemployment rate in the city was 3.98 per cent which was above the Northern Territory average of 3.5 per cent.

The largest industry employers in Palmerston are public administration & safety (2,751 or 21.3 per cent), retail trade (1,190 or 9.2 per cent), construction (892 or 6.9 per cent), health care & social assistance (829 or 6.4 per cent) and education & training (825 or 6.4 per cent). The total numbers of businesses in Palmerston was 1,410. Of these, 57% of businesses were categorised as non-employing.

=== Retail ===
Palmerston has four major shopping centres: Palmerston Shopping Centre, Bakewell Shopping Centre, Gateway Shopping Centre, and Oasis Shopping Village. The Palmerston Shopping Centre contains over 69 businesses including a Coles Supermarket, and the discount department store Target. Oasis Shopping Village contains a Coles supermarket and 18 businesses. Stage 1 of the new Gateway Shopping Centre has numerous specialty stores including Big W, Best & Less, and Woolworths. Stage 2 includes the Pavilions Dining and Entertainment area, as well as Gateway Home—which opened in early 2018.

== Education ==
For further information see Schools in the Northern Territory.

=== Preschool, primary and secondary ===
Palmerston is served by 11 state primary schools, two Catholic primary schools, two private schools, one state secondary school (Palmerston College) and one Catholic secondary school (MacKillop Catholic College). There are over 5,867 primary and secondary students enrolled in Palmerston with 2,942 students attending primary education and 1,292 students attending secondary education. There are over 3,100 students enrolled in government schools in Palmerston, 1087 students enrolled in Catholic schools and 625 students enrolled in independent schools.

In 2017, the now former Rosebery Middle School amalgamated into Palmerston's secondary school campus of Palmerston Senior College (formerly Driver High School) to create the dual campus facility, Palmerston College.

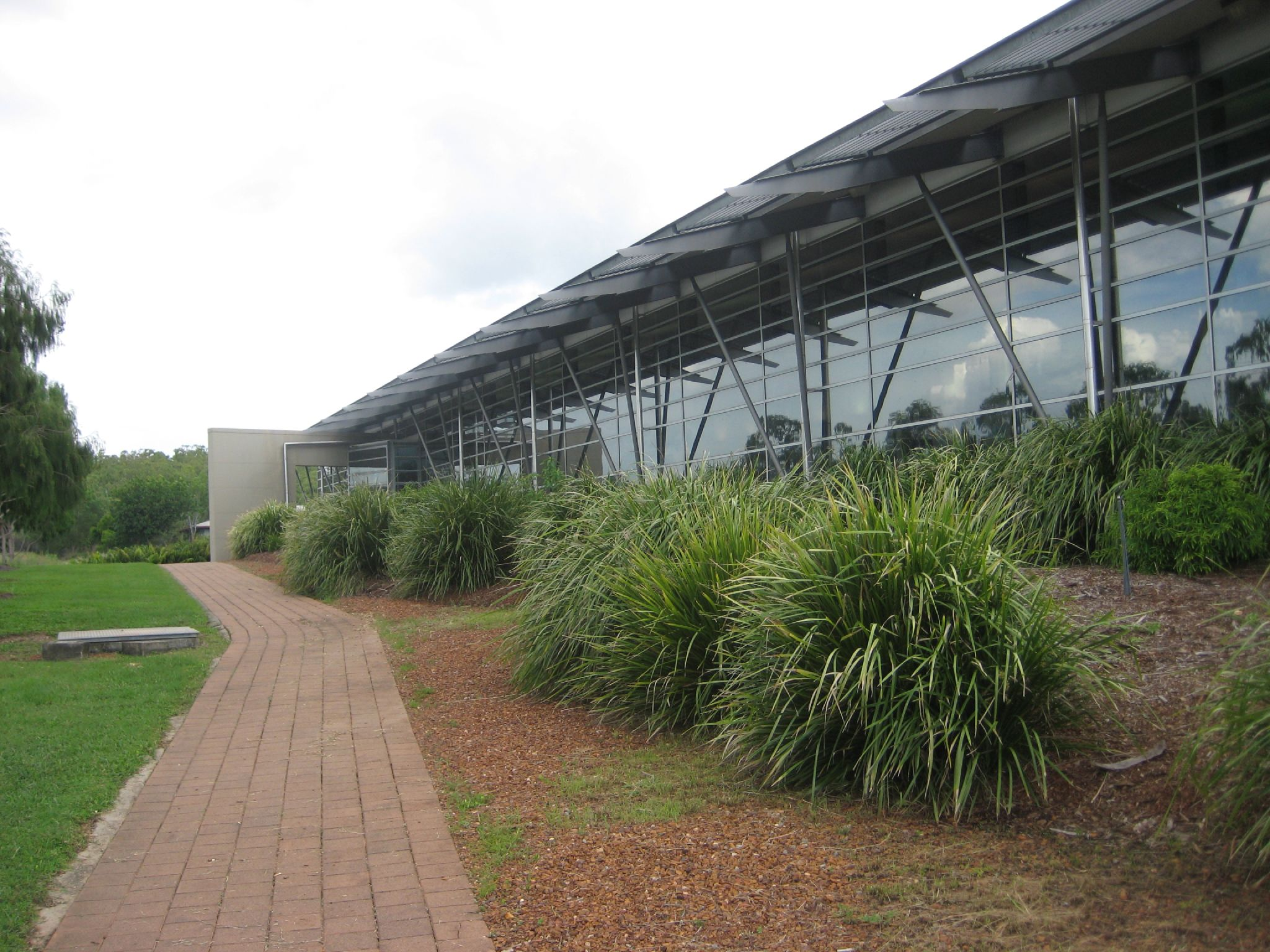
Charles Darwin University Library

=== Tertiary and vocational ===
The Charles Darwin University Palmerston campus is located in the suburb of Durack. The campus hosts the School of Tourism and Hospitality as well as expanding into a mini-School of Conservation and Land Management. There are over 4,318 students enrolled in tertiary and further education courses. In 2008, 247 of Palmerston residents were enrolled in higher education at Charles Darwin University and 4,071 students enrolled in vocational education and training.

== Sport and recreation ==
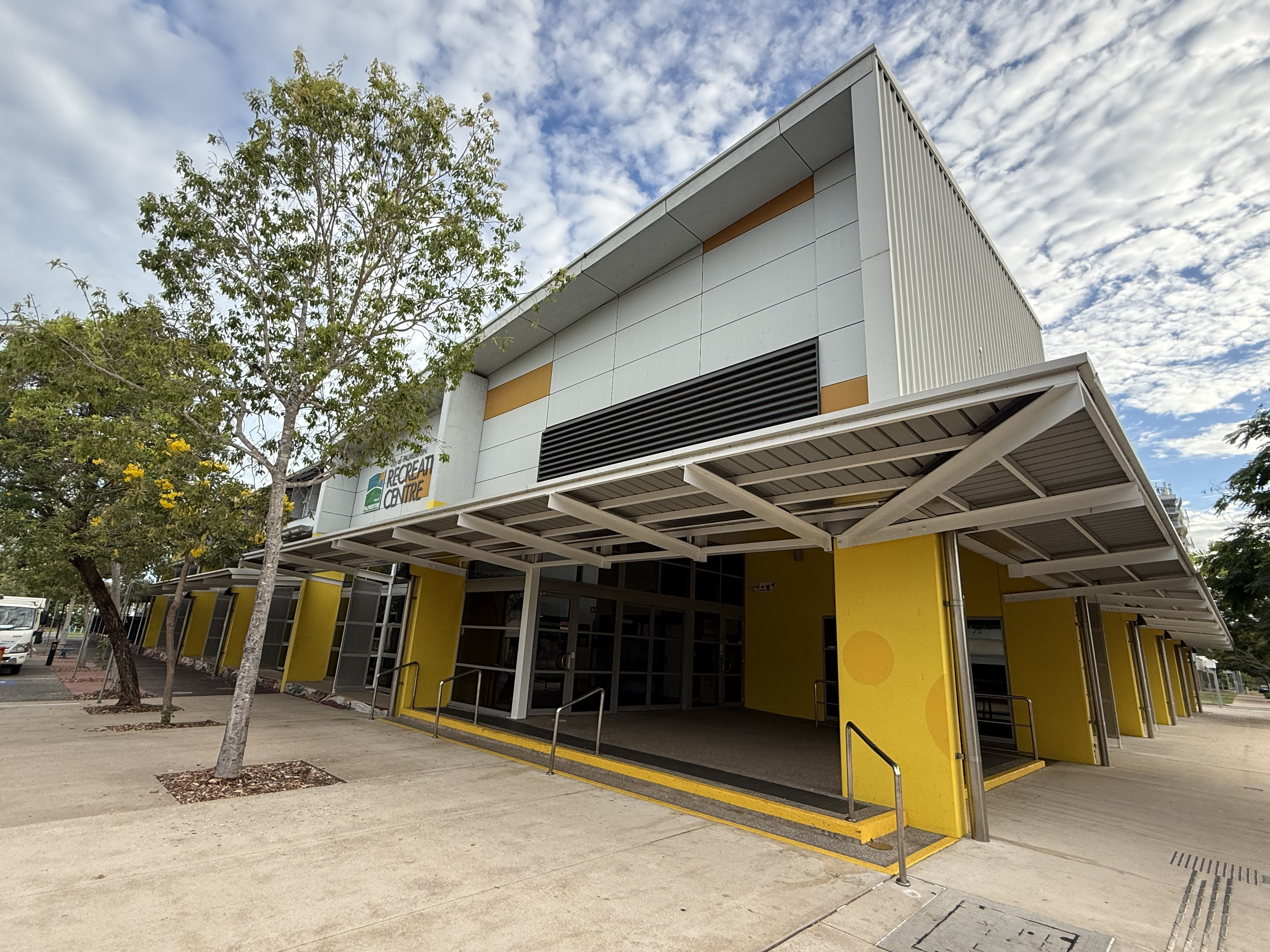
Palmerston Recreation Centre, October 2025

Palmerston is home to the Palmerston Football Club (known as the "Magpies"), which plays in the Northern Territory Football League (AFL) and is based out of the Archer Sporting Complex. Palmerston has a strong presence in Australian rules football. The Archer Sporting Complex has an Australian rules football field, a senior Softball diamond and senior Baseball diamond. There are also a number of sporting clubs located at the complex. The complex is home to the Palmerston and Rural Baseball Club, and the Palmerston Pirates Softball team.

There are three Rugby Union teams in the Palmerston area. These are the Palmerston Crocs, the Swampdogs and the MacKillop Saints.

The Palmerston Raiders Rugby League team are based at Goodline Park in the Southern suburbs.

Palmerston has one association football team, the Palmerston Rovers FC which plays in the Northern Zone League.

The city has a skate park located on University Avenue that is funded by the Palmerston City Council.

There is also a local near-Olympic size swimming pool with a gymnasium.

There is also a boat ramp allowing access to the Elizabeth River for small trail-able marine craft. Persons utilising the area are cautioned that both box jellyfish and crocodiles are present in the river.

A branch of the YWCA is located at the CBD.

The Palmerston Scouts are based at MacKillop Catholic College.

Palmerston has one major tennis centre. Opened in January 2012 it includes 7 courts, BBQ area and canteen. The centre offers group coaching and competition opportunities for people of all ages.

Palmerston is well served by its many park reserves. Some parks also offer coin-operated public barbecue facilities.

Palmerston Golf & Country Club has a full 18-hole design with the Northern Territory PGA Championship held there.

== Media ==
The Northern Territory News, published daily by News Corp, is widely available in Palmerston. Its Sunday edition, The Sunday Territorian, and the national newspaper, The Australian, are also published by News Corp and are also available in Palmerston. Most large statewide and interstate newspapers are also available from local retailers, albeit with a delay in arrival.

Palmerston also receives radio and television services sourced from transmitters located in the Darwin region, which include the three commercial channels 7 Darwin, Nine Darwin and Darwin Digital Television and the two Government-owned channels ABC and SBS. Pay television is also available through satellite, fixed cable and IPTV from various providers, such as Foxtel and Fetch.

Palmerston receives most of the radio stations from Darwin, which include ABC Local Radio (105.7FM), Radio National (657AM), ABC Classic (107.3FM) and Triple J (103.3FM), as well as commercial radio stations Mix 104.9 and Hot 100 and community radio station 104.1 Territory FM.

== Transport ==
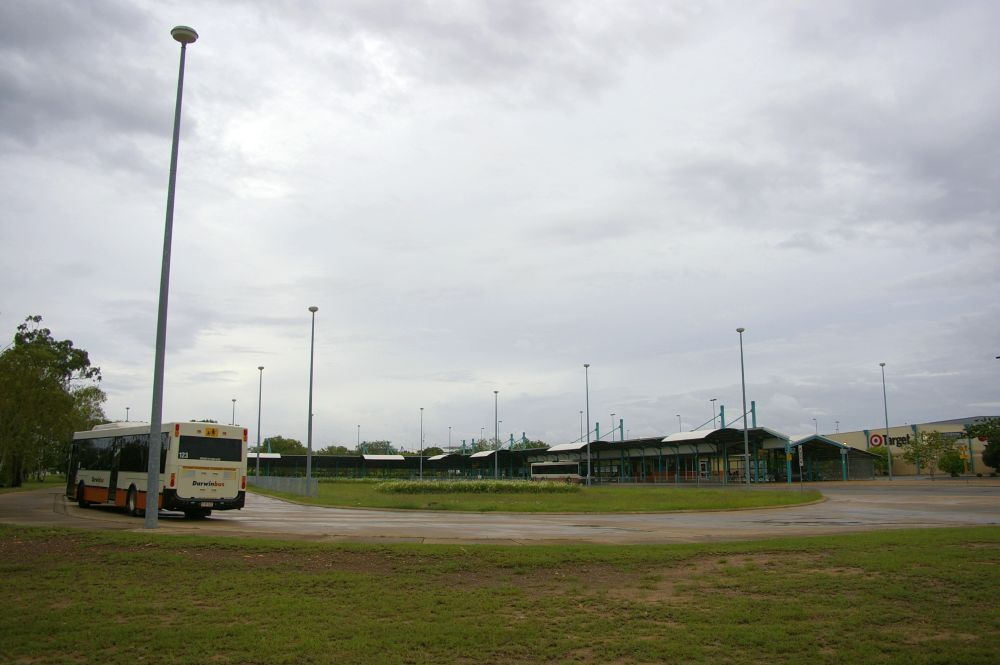
Palmerston Bus Interchange.

The city has a network of bicycle paths, most of which are lit for night-time usage.

There is also a public bus service operated by Darwinbus that offers transportation around Palmerston, into Darwin City and out to Darwin's northern suburbs.

Darwin International Airport is the closest air terminal in Palmerston. The airport is located in the Darwin suburb of Marrara, approximately 20 minutes away from Palmerston.

Darwin-based taxis are also available in Palmerston, as well as a number of local and Darwin-based mini-bus operators.

== Utilities ==
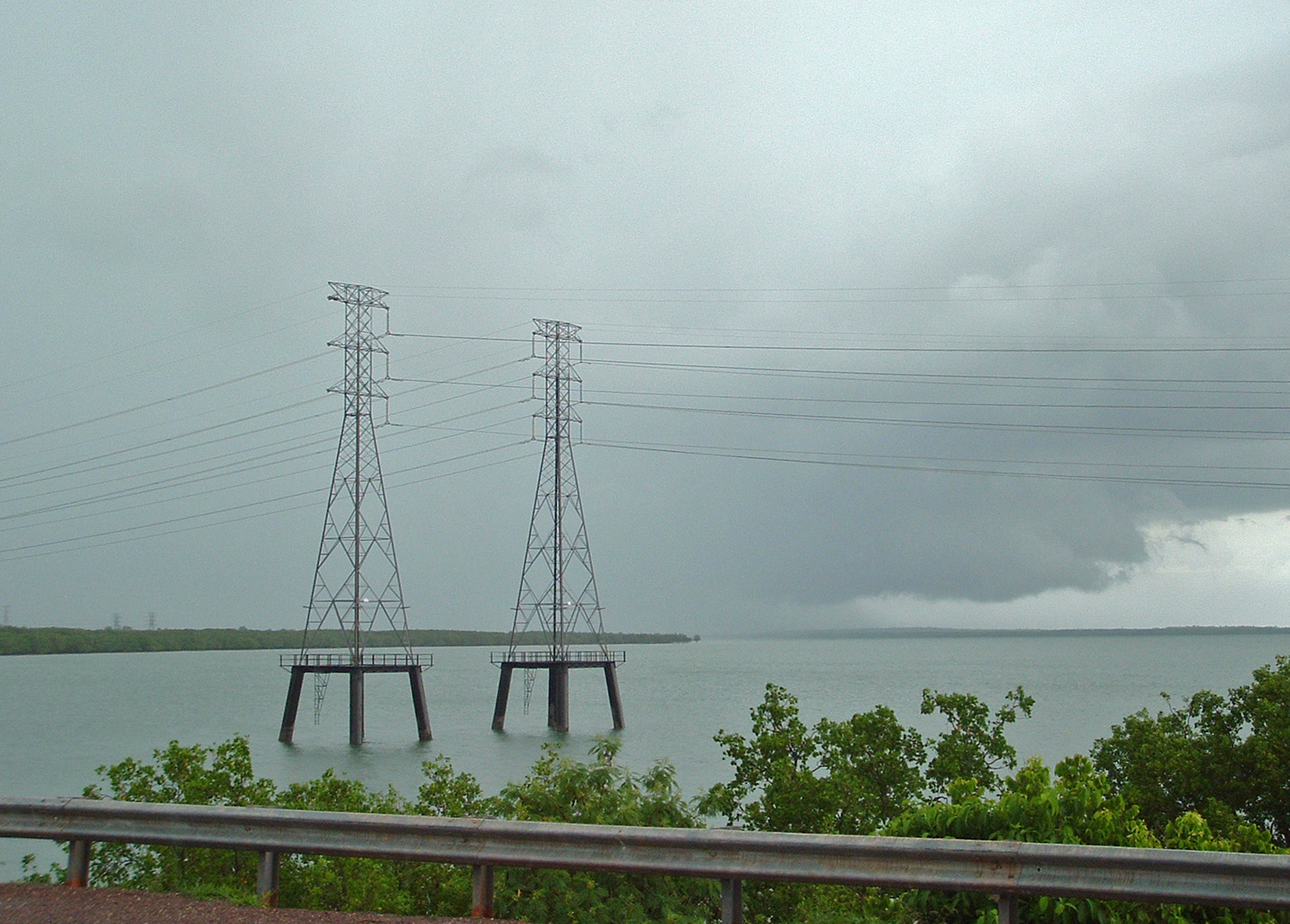
Channel Island Power Station

Water storage and supply, as well as sewerage services for Palmerston, are managed by PowerWater, while power is managed by Jacana Energy, both of which are owned by the Northern Territory Government. The corporation is also responsible for management of sewerage and the major water catchments in the region. Water is mainly stored in the largest dam, the Darwin River Dam which holds up to 90% of Palmerston's water supply. For many years, the city's principal water supply came from Manton Dam.

Palmerston and its suburbs are powered by the Channel Island Power Station, the largest power plant in the Northern Territory.

== Health ==
Many of Palmerston's health needs are serviced by the Palmerston Health Precinct which includes the Palmerston Community Care Centre, public dental service, St John Ambulance, Medical Specialists Clinic and the Farrar Medical Centre. There are seven general practices in the Palmerston health region, four of which provide after-hours services.

There are two hospitals serving the Palmerston area. These are Royal Darwin Hospital, located in the Darwin suburb of Tiwi and Palmerston Regional Hospital, which is located in Holtze.
