= Palmerston City, Northern Territory =

Palmerston City Palmerston, Northern Territory
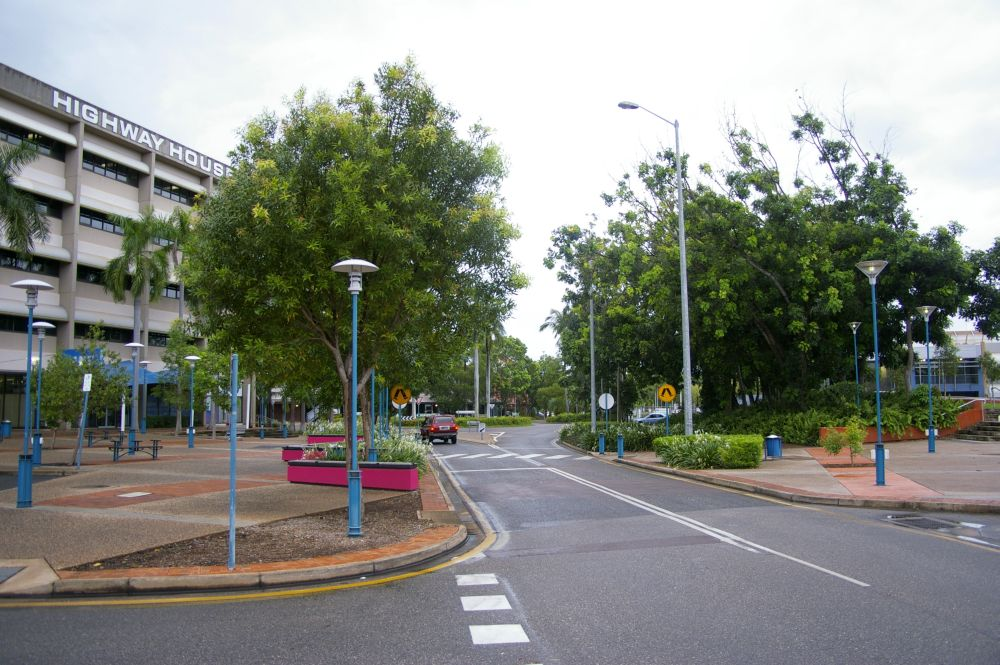

- Coordinates: 12°28′52″S 130°58′59″E
- Population: 21 (2016 census)
- Postcode(s): 0830
- LGA(s): City of Palmerston
- Territory electorate(s): Drysdale
- Federal division(s): Solomon
Suburbs around Palmerston City:
Pinelands		Yarrawonga
Durack	Palmerston City	Farrar
Driver	Gray	Gunn

Palmerston City is an inner suburb of Palmerston, Northern Territory, Australia, located within the City of Palmerston. It is on the traditional Country and waterways of the Larrakia people. Its postcode is 0830. It contains the Palmerston Shopping Centre, the City of Palmerston council offices, Frances Mira Mall, a sporting complex, a library and bus terminal. Its main core is bounded by University Avenue to the northwest, Chung Wah Terrace to the southwest, Rolyat Street and Temple Terrace to the southeast and Roystonea Avenue to the northeast. Every Friday night during dry season it host the Palmerston markets. The Palmerston markets is a large festive market which includes live music, swap stalls and food vendors.
