= Zuccoli, Northern Territory =

Zuccoli Darwin, Northern Territory
- Coordinates: 12.5118°S 131.0034°E
- Population: 1,129 (2016 census)
- Postcode(s): 0832
- LGA(s): City of Palmerston
- Territory electorate(s): Johnston; Brennan
- Federal division(s): Lingiari

Zuccoli is a suburb in the City of Palmerston, Northern Territory, Australia, located to the south-west of Palmerston City. It is on the traditional Country and waterways of the Larrakia people. Its postal code is 0832. It was registered on 3 April 2007.

The Zuccoli Plaza shopping centre is located in the suburb. It has an IGA supermarket, a gym, a medical centre, a chemist, a coffee shop and nine other shops.

== Name origin ==
Zuccoli is named after Guido Zuccoli (1940–1997), an internationally competing aerobatics pilot and Northern Territory businessman.

== Education ==
There are two primary schools situated in the suburb of Zuccoli:

- Mother Teresa Catholic Primary School, Zuccoli
- Zuccoli Primary School
