= Johnston, Northern Territory =

Johnston Darwin, Northern Territory
- Coordinates: 12.4864°S 131.0096°E
- Population: 2,027 (2016 census)
- Postcode(s): 0832
- LGA(s): City of Palmerston
- Territory electorate(s): Johnston
- Federal division(s): Lingiari

Johnston is a suburb of Palmerston, Northern Territory, Australia. It was named in commemoration of Commodore Eric Eugene Johnston (1933 to 1997), Northern Territory Administrator from 1981 to 1989. The suburb was registered on 3 April 2007. It is on the traditional Country and waterways of the Larrakia people.

The suburb of Johnston is one of Palmerston's newest suburbs located 3km from the CBD. Rapidly growing, Johnston has a number of low rise apartment buildings under construction as well as numerous new homes, restaurants and stores.

With house prices averaging over $650,000 and apartments averaging over $560,000, Johnston's residences are priced well above average in the area.

The suburb is divided by Farrar Boulevard with the two estates named Johnston The Parks on the west side and Johnston Ridge on the north side.

== Education ==
Johnston has one secondary school:

- MacKillop Catholic College, Palmerston NT
