= Hells Angels MC criminal allegations and incidents in Australia =

Criminal incidents involving the Hells Angels in Australia

The Hells Angels Motorcycle Club (HAMC), an international outlaw biker gang, has been involved in multiple crimes, alleged crimes, and violent incidents in Australia. The Hells Angels are legally classified as a criminal organisation in the Australian state of Queensland, and there have been attempts to classify them as such in New South Wales. The Hells Angels have been linked with drug trafficking and production, as well as a host of violent crimes including murder, in Australia.

== Background ==
The Hells Angels expanded to Australia in 1975, initially establishing chapters in Melbourne and Sydney, and now have approximately 250 members and 14 chapters in the country. The club's activities in Australia have traditionally included drug trafficking, prostitution, armed robbery, arms trafficking, fencing stolen goods and murder-for-hire, but they have more recently moved into legitimate businesses such as gyms, tattoo parlours, haulage companies, and the security industry. Police allege the Hells Angels use mainstream industries to launder existing funds and to exploit new income streams, using the strategies they developed during a series of gang wars to intimidate business competitors. The Australian Hells Angels have aligned themselves with the Coffin Cheaters, Immortals, Red Devils, Satans Soldiers, Vikings and the Prisoners of War, a prison gang operating inside HMP Barwon, while they have been involved in conflicts with the Bandidos, Comancheros, Diablos, Finks, Nomads and Notorious. The first conflict was with the Rebels after the Hells Angels demanded that the Rebels change their colors from red and white (the same color as the Hells Angels). The conflict ended with the Rebels beating a Hells Angels chapter president in his house with a baby's pram. In 2006, the Canadian journalists Julian Sher and William Marsden wrote: "The Hells Angels remain the most powerful bikie gang in the country, even though they have fewer members than other gangs such as the Rebels or the Gyspy Jokers.".

== By state ==
=== New South Wales ===
Members of the rival motorcycle gang, the Comancheros, and members of the Hells Angels were believed to be involved in a clash on a Melbourne to Sydney flight and subsequently at Sydney Airport on 22 March 2009. The clash resulted in one man, Hells Angels associate Anthony Zervas, being beaten to death. Police estimated as many as 15 men were involved in the violence. Documents released by NSW Police detail the brawl as a result of the Comanchero national president Mick Hawi and the Hells Angel national president Derek Wainohu being on the same flight from Melbourne. Four suspects were arrested as a result of the altercation. As a result of heightening violence, New South Wales Premier Nathan Rees announced the state police anti-gang squad would be boosted to 125 members from 50. The main suspect in this case, Mick Hawi was sentenced to jail and then released a few years later. Then he was himself shot dead in downtown Sydney in 2018

On the night of March 29, 2009, Hells Angels member Peter Zervas, the brother of the man killed during the Sydney Airport Brawl a week earlier, was shot and injured as he left his car outside his home.

On July 20, 2011, a NSW judge dismissed a bid by the state's police commissioner to have the Hells Angels Motorcycle Club declared a criminal organization, under laws introduced to NSW parliament in 2009 allowing the court to declare criminal organizations as declared organizations.

On 8 July 2013 Tyrone Lee Slemnik, 37, was standing guard outside the home of Hells Angels Sydney chapter president Suvat Sarimsaklioglu when he was gunned down as shots were fired from a passing car. No one has been held responsible for his death and there have been no arrests as a result. Following the death of Slemnik, Sarimsaklioglu, the club president was charged with the possession of a military-style assault weapon, found in the boot of a taxi for which he was later acquitted of. His lawyer, Omar Juweinat told the court that the police were unable to prove that Sarimsaklioglu knew the firearm was present. Police feared that the weapon was to be used for retaliation.

Following his acquittal for those matters, in April 2016 Sarimsaklioglu stood trial, with two others for abduction for which he was also found not guilty. In November 2017, he was charged for the supply of a large commercial quantity of drugs. He was held in custody for over 18 months before his trial was derailed by the prosecution, prompting lawyer Omar Juweinat to complain that "civil liberties are quickly eroding".

In January 2023, Sarimsaklioglu was sentenced to three years and two months imprisonment, with a non-parole period of 19 months, backdated to November 2021 due to time already served. The sentence related to his arrest at Surry Hills in a taxi along with another man and a backpack full of illicit drug precursor gamma-Butyrolactone in June 2021. Text messages showed they planned to supply drugs.

=== Northern Territory ===
The HAMC was established in the Northern Territory after "patching over" the Blonks, a Darwin-based bikie gang, on 2 April 1993. The Darwin chapter of the Hells Angels is believed to be involved in drug and gun rackets, trafficking firearms and other equipment stolen from army units.

Hells Angels members Nicholas Frank "Shonky" Cassidy and James Scott Parnell Knight were convicted of aggravated assault and sentenced to fifteen and twenty months' imprisonment, respectively, in September 2009. Three others were acquitted due to a lack of evidence. On 6 December 2007, Cassidy was knocked unconscious by two brothers, Bob and Warren Mahoney, in a pub in Darwin during a fight that resulted from a joke about Cassidy's weight. Less than an hour later, Cassidy, Knight and four Hells Angels associates returned to the pub and attacked the Mahoney brothers, who were hospitalized with facial injuries.

Levi Griffiths was killed after being hit by a ute driven by Hells Angels member Nicholas Cassidy, who was intoxicated at the time, in Howard Springs on 4 June 2011. Cassidy attempted to conceal the accident by moving Griffiths' body to an area on the Stuart Highway in Coolalinga several kilometres from the crash site, replacing the windscreen, and by spraying the vehicle with bleach and insecticide. Cassidy was arrested after being identified as the owner and driver of the vehicle that hit Griffiths. On 21 October 2013, he was convicted of attempting to pervert the course of justice; he was sentenced to two years in prison on 1 November.

Two Hells Angels associates were arrested and charged by the Northern Territory Police on 14 October 2020 with supplying a commercial quantity of a Schedule 1 dangerous drug, possession of a Schedule 2 dangerous drug, possession of unlicensed firearms, and possession of unlicensed ammunition. Unlicensed weapons, ammunition and drugs were also seized during a series of raids on multiple properties in the rural Darwin area. The raids were carried out as part of a national joint operation against the Hells Angels coordinated by National Task Force Morpheus and involving the Australian Federal Police (AFP), Australian Border Force (ABF) and other government agencies, which resulted in a total of twenty-four arrests and the seizure of firearms, ammunition, cash and drugs including methylamphetamine, cocaine, steroids and GHB at twenty-eight locations nationwide.

=== Queensland ===
The Brisbane chapter of the Hells Angels was founded on 27 March 1997.

Bruno and Nuno Da Silva, two Portuguese immigrant twin brothers and former Brisbane Hells Angels members, were arrested following a police surveillance operation and pleaded guilty to trafficking methylamphetamine from June 2012 to October 2013. The brothers operated from an East Brisbane locksmith business and passed a percentage of their drug earnings to the Hells Angels at weekly meetings, although they had left the club at the time of their arrest. In December 2015, Bruno was sentenced to nine years imprisonment, while Nuno was sentenced to seven years.

In 2012, Peter Sidirourgos and Zeljko "Steve" Mitrovic, both senior Hells Angels members in Sydney, were granted Nomad status and spearheaded a push into the Gold Coast, founding a chapter in the suburb of Burleigh Heads. Police stated in 2015 that the Hells Angels were now the most active club on the Gold Coast after anti-bikie laws weakened the rival Bandidos and Finks (a club later patched over to the Mongols), who had previously been more prominent in the area.

The Hells Angels were one of 26 motorcycle clubs designated as criminal organizations in the state of Queensland under the Vicious Lawless Association Disestablishment (VLAD) Act, which was passed on October 16, 2013, and went into effect immediately.

=== South Australia ===
The first HAMC chapter in South Australia was formed in Adelaide on 1 October 1983.

Similar to the case in Queensland, the Hells Angels were also declared a criminal organization in the state of South Australia along with nine other motorcycle clubs under legislation that came into force in August 2015. Under the laws, it is an offence for members of these organizations to gather in groups of three or more in public or wear gang colours and logos. Five alleged Hells Angels members and prospects became the first to be charged under the laws after they were arrested in a series of raids across Adelaide on December 31, 2015.

Popular criminal Vince Focarelli was kicked out of the Hells Angels. He then joined other clubs including the Comancheros, and set up his own club. He left the Comancheros later. Him and his son Giovanni were shot at by unknown assailants in 2012. Vince was sent to the Royal Adelaide Hospital and his son died. He has refused to name any suspects even though this was not the first time he was targeted. While Vince was in hospital, he was visited by friends who are Finks members. Some Finks members also visited the funeral of Giovanni.

=== Victoria ===
==== 1980s ====
In 1980, Melbourne chapter founding members Peter John Hill and Raymond Hamment flew to California to visit Oakland chapter president Kenny Walton in prison. Walton taught them how to manufacture amphetamines, paving the way for the drug's introduction into Australia, and in return, the Australians supplied the Oakland chapter with 300 litres of the chemical phenylacetone, enough to produce $50 million worth of amphetamines. Hill posted the phenylacetone in three-litre pineapple juice tins to his closest US contact, James Patton "Sleepy Jim" Brandes. The Hells Angels rented a farmhouse in Melbourne's northeast, near Hurstbridge, where they produced amphetamines in 50 pound (22.7 kilogram) batches worth $600,000. The drug lab was raided by the Special Operations Group on March 10, 1982, and Hill and three other Hells Angels were arrested. Eventually, investigators arrested 19 people and seized three kilograms of amphetamines, as well as cash, explosives, handguns and a machine-gun. This sparked an internal feud over the gang's operations that led to around 40 violent incidents. Hill and another member, Roger Biddlestone, cut their ties with the Hells Angels and Hill cooperated with police, prompting the club to put a contract on their lives. Nine Hells Angels were charged with conspiring to murder Hill and Biddlestone, but Biddlestone refused to testify and the charges against his former club mates were dropped; he was subsequently convicted of contempt of court. Hill was convicted on drugs charges in 1987 and jailed alongside a number of others. During the investigation, codenamed Omega Two, the police tracked club members' movements ferociously, prompting Jim Brandes, the Melbourne Hells Angels' American contact, to try to assassinate Bob Armstrong, a detective on the case. Brandes, who had previously been acquitted of the 1978 attempted murder two police officers in the US, flew to Melbourne but was immediately deported.

==== 1990s ====
Terrence Raymond "Terry" Tognolini, the president and enforcer in the Hells Angels Nomads, was involved in an apparent road rage incident with motorist Mustafa Yildirim in Campbellfield, Melbourne on December 22, 1995. Tognolini followed Yildirim to his workplace and the men traded blows until they were separated before Tognolini retrieved a gun from his car and fired several shots at Yildirim, all of which missed. Police raided Tognolini's home and found five cannabis plants in the backyard. He was charged with unlawful assault, assault with a weapon, making threats to kill, possessing cannabis and cultivating a narcotic plant. The case against him collapsed, however, when Yildirim refused to testify after being repeatedly harassed.

Terrence Tognolini was later implicated in the murder of Vicki Joy Jacobs, a 37-year-old woman who was shot six times as she slept next to her six-year-old son in her apartment in Long Gully, Bendigo on 12 June 1999. The previous year, Jacobs had given evidence that helped convict her ex-husband Gerald David Preston for the August 1996 murders of drug dealer and mechanic Les Knowles and his employee Tim Richards in Adelaide, and her testimony implicated the Hells Angels in hiring Preston for the killings. The prosecution heard that Tognolini had contracted Preston to murder Knowles who was trying to expand into the Hells Angels' drug territory, and also sold him the Luger pistol that was used in the murders. Victoria Police bulldozed their way into the fortified Thomastown headquarters of the Nomads chapter in July 1999 as part of the investigation, seizing a sawn-off shotgun, bulletproof vest, bags of documents and three motorcycles. Tognolini was overseas and Preston imprisoned at the time of Jacobs' murder and no one has been charged with the crime; however, a coronial inquest in 2004 declared that police believe she was killed on the orders of the Hells Angels as a payment for Preston remaining silent over the club's involvement in the Adelaide murders.

==== 2000s ====
In June 2004, the Victoria police arrested Stephen Rogers, the president of the Melbourne chapter of the Hells Angels on charges of trafficking in amphetamine. The Victoria police seized assets worth $3 million Australian dollars including six houses, cars, trucks, and motorcycles.. In 2004 the Hells Angels and the Rebels were involved in a brawl at the Dance Music Awards at the Adelaide football stadium that ended with the bikies first using the chairs and their fists as weapons, followed up by guns. The guests at the Dance Music Awards fled in terror as shots were fired.

Hells Angels members Raymond Joseph "Ray" Hamment, Jr. and Paul Peterson, and club associate Andrew Hinton, each pleaded guilty to charges of conduct endangering life, intentionally causing serious injury, false imprisonment and rioting after abducting Brendan Schievella from outside a bar and holding him captive for five hours in Ivanhoe, Melbourne on June 25, 2005. Schievella was found with a toe amputated but told police he could not recall how it happened and no motive has been established for the incident.

In January 2007, Terrence Tognolini was expelled from the Hells Angels, had his tattoos removed, was savagely beaten and dumped on the street outside the Thomastown clubhouse after his fellow members learned that he was the subject of child sex allegations. Police arrested him on blackmail and arson charges and for a series of sex offences six months later. He was found guilty of 18 counts of supplying a drug of dependence to a child, one count of an indecent act with a child under 16, and one count of attempting to pervert the course of justice and imprisoned for 6 1/2 years in 2009, and was further convicted of nine counts of blackmail, three of arson, two of intentionally causing injury and stalking and had 18 months added to his sentence in 2010. Many of Toglioni's crimes were part of an extortion racket he ran, using his former Hells Angels connections as well as threats and assaults to intimidate his victims.

On June 18, 2007, Hells Angels member Christopher Wayne Hudson opened fire on two men and a woman during an argument in the Central Business District of Melbourne; after assaulting his girlfriend Kara Douglas, two male bystanders, Brendan Keilar and Paul de Waard attempted to assist Douglas. Hudson pulled a gun and shot all three, killing Keilar, on the corner of William Street and Flinders Lane. Hudson fled from the scene and went into hiding for two days, before turning himself in to police on June 20, 2007, in Wallan, north of Melbourne. In May 2008, Hudson pleaded guilty to the murder of Brendan Keilar and was sentenced that September to life imprisonment with a minimum of 35 years before becoming eligible for parole.

==== 2010s ====
Hells Angels member Glyn David Dickman was found guilty of intentionally causing serious injury and threatening to kill, and acquitted of theft, while club hang-around Ali Chaouk was found guilty of recklessly causing serious injury, threat to kill and false imprisonment in October 2014 after the pair beat 18-year-old German tourist Faisal Aakbari with a baseball bat at the Hells Angels clubhouse in Thomastown in September 2009 when he falsely claimed to be a club member. Aakbari's injuries included bleeding between the skull and lining of the brain, a broken leg and lacerations to his scalp and face.

Peter John "Skitzo" Hewat, sergeant-at-arms of the Hells Angels' East County chapter in Campbellfield, Melbourne, was arrested in March 2013 after striking a 64-year-old woman during a dispute over his dog, and was again arrested that October as part of a statewide raid targeting the Hells Angels in which thirteen people were arrested and weapons and drugs were seized. Hewat was sentenced to 10 months in jail in January 2014 after he pleaded guilty to assault, weapons offences, handling stolen goods and operating a tow truck without the proper licence.

The Bandidos reportedly declared war on the Hells Angels after an ambush on several Bandidos members outside the affiliated Diablos' clubhouse in Melton, Melbourne on 1 March 2013 in which over 30 shots were fired and two men, including Bandidos national sergeant-at-arms Toby Mitchell, were wounded. The Hells Angels Nomads chapter were blamed for the attack and brothers Daniel and Ben Pegoraro, both members of Hells Angels puppet club the Red Devils, were questioned by police. Within a week of the shooting, a clubhouse in Bendigo linked to the Hells Angels was burned down and the Pegoraro brothers' home in Epping, Melbourne was attacked in a drive-by shooting. Although prolonged violence was expected, the feud seemingly ended after senior members of the two clubs held peace talks.

Ray Hamment, Jr., the president of the Hells Angels Nomads, pleaded guilty to a charge of recklessly causing serious injury and was jailed three months after attacking a man who approached him in a McDonald's restaurant in Thomastown on June 7, 2013.

The Hells Angels carried out drive-by shootings (using either AK-47s or M1 carbines) and attempted bombings on two properties, a tattoo parlour in Dandenong and a gym in Hallam, owned by Comancheros state president Michael "Mick" Murray in the early hours of September 30, 2013 after several Hells Angels were assaulted while trying to recover stolen motorcycles from the rival club. Within hours of the attacks, the clubhouse of the Hells Angels' Darkside chapter in Seaford, Melbourne was shot at in an apparent retaliation. On October 13, 2013, Victoria police raided every Hells Angels property in the state in an attempt to curb bikie-related violence, seizing guns, ammunition, drugs and cash, and arresting 13 people, but failed to retrieve the assault rifles used in the shootings. Dennis Basic, a prospective member of the Darkside chapter, was arrested for the attempted bombings of the properties and pleaded guilty to thirteen charges which also included firearm and drug possession; having been held in custody since his arrest until the time of his sentencing in December 2015, the judge ruled that the time he had served in jail was sufficient penalty but ordered he serve a 12-month community corrections order.

The president of the Hells Angels' Darkside chapter, Mohammed "Sam" Khodr, was jailed for 7 1/2 years for selling more than $220,000 worth of amphetamines to undercover police officers in January 2015. He had been targeted during an investigation code-named Operation Statin, part of a major crackdown on motorcycle gangs by Victoria Police, and sold 910 grams of the drug to officers in 11 separate transactions between October 2013 and February 2014. He also sold a Browning semi-automatic pistol with ammunition to the officers for $10,500.

== See also ==
- Bandidos MC criminal allegations and incidents in Australia

== Books ==
- Sher, Julian; Marsden, William (2006). Angels of Death: Inside the Bikers' Empire of Crime. Toronto: Alfred Knopf Canada. ISBN 9780307370327.
