= Bandidos MC criminal allegations and incidents in Australia =

Criminal incidents involving the Bandidos Motorcycle Club in Australia

The Bandidos Motorcycle Club is classified as a motorcycle gang by law enforcement and intelligence agencies in numerous countries. While the club has denied being a criminal organization, Bandidos members have been convicted of partaking in criminal enterprises including theft, extortion, prostitution, drug trafficking and murder in various host nations.

The club is considered an outlaw motorcycle gang by the Australian Federal Police. Numerous police investigations have targeted Bandidos members, and implicated them in illegal drugs supply and other crimes. Australia's first Bandidos chapter was formed in Sydney in August 1983. The club has around 400 members and 45 chapters in the country, and has recruited members of various ethnic backgrounds. The Australian Bandidos are allied with the Diablos, Mobshitters and Rock Machine, while their rivals include the Comancheros, Finks, Gypsy Jokers, Hells Angels, Mongols, Notorious, Rebels and Red Devils.

== New South Wales ==
=== Conflict with the Comancheros ===
The Bandidos' first international chapter was founded in Sydney by eleven disillusioned former members of the Comancheros. In 1983, Comancheros founder and president William "Jock" Ross was allegedly caught in a compromising position with another club member's wife, a serious breach of club rules. Facing expulsion from the club, Ross refused to face any disciplinary action and instead announced that the Comancheros would be split into two chapters; those who supported bringing charges against Ross remained at the Birchgrove clubhouse while Ross and the remaining Comancheros set up a new clubhouse in Harris Park. Fighting between the two chapters prompted the Birchgrove chapter to break away and form a new club. Chapter president Anthony "Snodgrass" Spencer, who had previously encountered the Bandidos' Albuquerque, New Mexico chapter during a visit to the United States, contacted their national president Ronnie Hodge and eventually received approval to form the first Australian Bandidos chapter and become its national president. Violence between the Bandidos and Comancheros continued until August 1984 when the two rival clubs formally declared war. Police believe the war began over turf, or drugs, or a combination of both.

On 2 September 1984, thirty-four Bandidos members and nineteen members of the Comancheros engaged in a shoot-out at a hotel in Milperra. The gun battle, which has come to be known as the Milperra massacre, left seven dead; Bandidos members Mario "Chopper" Cianter and Gregory "Shadow" Campbell, Comancheros members Robert "Foggy" Lane, Phillip "Leroy" Jeschke, Ivan "Sparra" Romcek and Tony "Dog" McCoy, as well as Leanne Walters, a fourteen-year-old innocent bystander who was shot in the face with a stray bullet. Twenty-eight people were also wounded. The resulting court case following the massacre was at the time one of the largest in Australian history. Five Comancheros bikies were given life sentences for murder while sixteen Bandidos received sentences of seven years for manslaughter. Bandidos national president Anthony "Snodgrass" Spencer hanged himself in prison on 28 April 1985 before he could stand trial.

Hostilities between the Bandidos and the Comancheros resumed in April 2007 after more than sixty members of the Parramatta and Granville chapters of the Nomads, previously affiliated with the Comancheros, defected to the Bandidos. The defection resulted in a new eruption of violence between the clubs, involving fire-bombings and drive-by shootings. New South Wales Police set up Operation Ranmore to stop the violence escalating, which resulted in three-hundred-and-forty people arrested on 883 charges as of January 2008.

=== Conflict with the Rebels ===
Bandidos members Michael "Kaos" Kulakowski, Saša "Sash" Milenković and Rick Raymond de Stoop were shot dead in the basement of a nightclub in Chippendale, Sydney in the early hours of 10 November 1997 by Konstantinos "Kon" Georgiou and Bruce Malcolm Harrison. Another Bandido, Robin David, survived with minor wounds. Georgiou was a serving member of the Rebels at the time, while Harrison was a former member. Kulakowski was the Bandidos' national president, and Milenković was the national sergeant-at-arms. De Stoop had briefly joined the Rebels and left owing money before defecting to the Bandidos. The conflict between the groups had arisen over the control of the club's security. Harrison was apprehended in a nearby street, while Georgiou was arrested in February 1998 aboard a cargo ship due to set sail for Japan from Botany Bay. The pair were found guilty of the murders in August 1999, but successfully appealed against the verdict. After a second trial was aborted, Georgiou and Harrison were again convicted at a third trial in April 2003 and were later sentenced to a minimum of twenty-eight years in prison.

Four Bandidos members – Joshua Clark, Bradley John Duff, Malcolm Sinclair Greig and Todd Obierzynski – were arrested after being found in possession of two semi-automatic rifles when they were stopped by police in a routine traffic check in Sydney's west while travelling home after carrying out two drive-by shootings on 10 December 2008. Police believed the shootings, carried out in Lurnea and Sadleir, to be linked to a dispute between the Bandidos and Rebels.

=== Conflict with the Gypsy Jokers ===
On 30 January 2000, Bandidos member Paul Andrew Bobos was wounded after being shot in the chest with a Smith & Wesson revolver as he travelled to work on his Harley-Davidson motorcycle in Mourquong. Three men associated with the Adelaide chapter of the Gypsy Jokers – Robert Cameron, William James Fuller and David Shannon – were charged with Bobos' shooting. Prosecutors alleged Fuller was a nominee for Gypsy Joker membership, and had shot Bobos as part of his initiation. In November 2000, Shannon was sentenced to six years in prison after pleading guilty to firearms offences. Bobos died in an unrelated incident on 24 September 2000.

A feud between the Bandidos and the Gypsy Jokers in the Hunter Valley began with several bashings before the home of a Bandidos member in Abermain was strafed in a drive-by shooting and a tattoo parlour owned by the club's Kurri Kurri chapter president Rodney Leslie "Pardo" Partington was firebombed in February 2001. On 24 March 2001, Partington was killed when a homemade bomb exploded in his hands outside the Gypsy Jokers' Weston clubhouse.

=== Hitjob against Sean Waygood and his retaliation ===
Bandidos members Felix "Big F" Lyle and his son Dallas Fitzgerald were targeted in a shooting at a pub in Haymarket carried out by Sean Lawrence Waygood, of the Anthony Perish criminal gang network, and his associate Michael Peter Christiansen on 8 October 2002 after the club was contracted to kill Waygood following an assault at a nightclub where he worked security. Neither of the Bandidos members were hit, although Raniera Puketapu, who had been mistaken for Fitzgerald, was shot three times and wounded. Waygood pleaded guilty to shooting Puketapu as well as his involvement in a kidnapping and a separate attempted murder, and was sentenced to at least fifteen years in prison in May 2010.

=== Infighting ===
Felix Lyle served as the president of the Bandidos' "Downtown" chapter in Pyrmont, Sydney until 2002 and was expelled from the club by his successor Rodney "Hooks" Monk in 2006 for allegedly being "not of good character". Monk's feud with Lyle and Dallas Fitzgerald related to the theft of $2 million worth of pseudoephedrine from Milad Sande, a major drug distributor and Bandidos associate who was shot dead during the robbery in Malabar on 23 November 2005. Police believe Monk was behind the subsequent February 2006 kidnapping and torture of Fitzgerald over his role in the murder-robbery, and that Lyle paid $300,000 in ransom money. The kidnapping was allegedly a joint Bandidos and Nomads operation, as Sande was also affiliated with the Nomads. Monk was shot and killed in East Sydney on 20 April 2006, allegedly by Bandidos member and Fitzgerald's protégé Russell Oldham, who later committed suicide by gunshot on Balmoral Beach on 11 May 2006. Lyle went on to join the Hells Angels and served as president of the club's Sydney chapter. In February 2011, he organised the defection of around fifty to sixty Bandidos members to the Hells Angels, which led to the dissolvement of the Bandidos' Parramatta chapter. The Hells Angels paid $6 million to entice the Bandidos members to switch allegiance.

=== Conflict with Notorious ===
The remaining former members of the Nomads' disbanded Parramatta chapter went on to found Notorious, a pseudo-motorcycle club. On 16 March 2009, a drive-by shooting was carried out at the house of Mahmoud Dib, the sergeant-at-arms of the Bandidos' Blacktown, Sydney chapter. Notorious is suspected of the attack. On 20 March 2009, relatives of Notorious members were the targets of two drive-by shootings in Doonside and Prospect. It is suspected that these were retaliation shootings carried out by the Bandidos. Further drive-by shootings that took place in Auburn on 22 March 2009, leaving two men in hospital, are believed to be related to Bandidos discovering that two associates of the club's Blacktown chapter were providing Notorious with the addresses of Bandidos members. On 29 March 2009, police acting on an anonymous tipoff discovered an unexploded homemade bomb outside the home of Mostafa Jouayde, president of the Bandidos' Parramatta chapter, in Granville.

=== Drug trafficking ===
Two senior Bandidos members were convicted of drug trafficking after police in Taree began investigating the club's involvement in the methamphetamine trade in August 2014. Ronald Dennis Leggett, the president of the Bandidos' Port Stephens chapter, was convicted of supplying more than 400 grams of methylamphetamine during a four-month period between 29 October 2014 and 11 February 2015, as well as possessing three firearms and other weapons. He was sentenced to a maximum of seven-and-a-half years in prison in May 2016. Manning Valley chapter treasurer and secretary Paul Rowsell, who sourced the drugs from Leggett and was subsequently selling them onto an undercover police officer posing as a dealer, was sentenced to a maximum five-and-a-half years in prison for his part in the supply ring.

Three men, including Sydney Bandidos chapter president Bradley John Duff, were arrested and charged with cultivating a commercial quantity of cannabis, supplying a commercial quantity of a prohibited drug and participating in a criminal group on 13 April 2020 after police stormed a property in Coolah and seized two-hundred-and-fifty kilograms of dried cannabis plants, at various stages of the harvest process – a $1.65 million cannabis crop.

=== Other incidents ===
On 14 January 2020, Shane "Wock" De Britt, president of the Bandidos' Central West chapter based in Molong, was fatally shot in the head with a 12-gauge Franchi shotgun at his home in Eurimbla in retaliation after members of the Wellington-based Grudge Bringers gang were beaten and robbed of their gang "colours" during a fight with Bandidos. Grudge Bringers founder Phillip Brian Woods planned the killing with Brenton James Hayes and ordered five other gang members, including Jace William Harding, Brendan James Russell McLachlan and Brian Anthony Farnsworth, to carry it out; McLachlan fired the fatal shot. Eight people – seven men and a woman – were arrested in connection with De Britt's murder. On 15 December 2023, Woods, Hayes, Harding, McLachlan and Farnsworth were convicted of murder by the Supreme Court of New South Wales.

Fares Abounader, who had joined the Bandidos after defecting from the Comancheros, was killed in a targeted drive-by shooting at his home in Panania on 29 August 2020. Police believe Abounader was murdered by two unidentified contract killers, who they suspect also carried out the fatal shooting of Mejid Hamzy – brother of Bassam Hamzy, founder of the Brothers for Life gang – outside his Condell Park residence on 19 October.

== Northern Territory ==
The Bandidos' first chapter in the Northern Territory was established in Darwin on 24 September 2016.

A man was arrested and charged with firearm-related offences, and a loaded, unsecured and unregistered shotgun, a large quantity of ammunition and a quantity of cannabis was seized after police raided the Darwin Bandidos chapter clubhouse in Virginia on 26 June 2019.

== Queensland ==
=== Drug trafficking ===
Mario John Vosmaer, a member of the Bandidos' Mooroka chapter and the former president of the club in Queensland, pleaded guilty to trafficking heroin for fourteen months between 1994 and 1996 and was sentenced to eight years in prison at Brisbane Supreme Court in November 2002.

Bandidos members Kevin Douglas Hill Aaron Gault and Luke James Dyer, who were recruited by the club in jail, were sentenced to seven and five years’ imprisonment, respectively, for dealing methamphetamine and cannabis from their shared house in Eagleby in May 2014.

=== Conflict with the Rebels ===
Bandidos Brisbane chapter president Blair Raymond Thomsen, vice-president Ivan Glavas, sergeant-at-arms Kenneth James Whittaker and John Debilla, an associate and disgruntled former Rebels member, were convicted in June 2008 of firebombing a Rebels clubhouse in Albion, Brisbane on 27 March 2007. The Bandidos had carried out the attack as retribution after Rebels members assaulted Bandidos bikies with baseball bats at Bribie Island in February 2007, leaving one man critically injured. Thomsen and Whittaker were sentenced to five years' imprisonment, suspended after twenty months, Glavas to four years', suspended after sixteen months, and Debilla was released after his 417 days already served in custody was deemed sufficient punishment.

The Bandidos are suspected in two drive-by shootings aimed at intimidation of Rebels members which were carried out in Bethania on 26 February 2017 and Calamvale on 10 March 2017. In relation to the turf war, police raided properties in Coomera, Marsden and Logan City on 30 March 2017, uncovering a Glock pistol, a revolver and drugs, including over 200 MDMA pills. Four people were arrested in connection to the incidents.

Seven Rebels members were charged after Harley Cranston, a member of the Bandidos' Beenleigh chapter who was allegedly brandishing a machete, was shot and wounded in the leg at the Logan Hyperdome in the Logan City suburb of Shailer Park on 4 February 2019. According to police, the rival bikies had gone to the shopping centre for a pre-arranged meeting when violence broke out. Two Rebels, Lucas James Pain and Logan chapter president Joshua John Lucey, ultimately stood trial, charged with acts intended to maim. On 7 June 2021, Lucey was acquitted, while a jury was unable to reach a verdict for Pain at Brisbane District Court.

=== Conflict with the Finks and the Mongols ===
On 28 April 2012, Bandidos member Jacques Teamo, along with an innocent female by-stander, received multiple gunshot wounds from a rival gang member at the Robina Town Centre on the Gold Coast. Mark James Graham, a Finks member who would later patch-over to the Mongols, was convicted of attempted murder and was sentenced to twelve years and three months in prison in November 2014.

Bandidos were involved in a mass brawl with Finks outside a Broadbeach tapas bar on 27 September 2013. Eighteen former Bandidos members, who were allegedly among a group of around fifty club members who travelled to the town that night to hunt down Bandidos enforcer Jacques Teamo's rival and Finks associate Jason Trouchet, pleaded guilty to their involvement and were given suspended prison sentences or fines at Brisbane Magistrates Court in August 2015.

=== Anti-gang legislation ===
The Bandidos were one of twenty-six groups declared criminal organisations by the Queensland State Government under the Criminal Law (Criminal Organisations Disruption) Amendment Act 2013, which was passed on 16 October 2013. The club's Brisbane chapters subsequently disbanded.

=== Extortion ===
Blair Raymond Thomsen, president of the Bandidos Sunshine Coast chapter, was sentenced to three years and nine months in prison in August 2017 for extortion. He had pleaded guilty in January 2017 to extorting a motorcycle (valued between $16,000-18,000) from a former club member and ordering another Bandidos member, Ricky Wayne McDougal, to take the motorcycle. Thomsen was also ordered to serve thirty-four months of a prison sentence that had been suspended, for the arson of a Rebels clubhouse during a dispute in 2007.

Two Bandidos members, including the president of the club's Brisbane chapter, were each charged with three counts of extortion, two counts of armed robbery and one count of using a carriage to menace, and arrested during a series of simultaneous police raids across the Moreton Bay suburbs of Caboolture, Scarborough and Burpengary on 1 October 2020.

=== Other incidents ===
Bandidos member Leslie David Gadd was sentenced to eight years in prison in November 2012 for wounding a man during a home invasion. Gadd and an unidentified accomplice entered the Little Mountain home of Jason Enrique Gravestein, shot him in the thigh, and robbed him of around half a kilo of cannabis and around $2000 in April 2011.

Bogdan Cuic, a member of the Bandidos' "West End" chapter in Brisbane, fled to Serbia after shooting and killing Jei "Jack" Lee during a botched cocaine deal in Eight Mile Plains on 12 April 2012. Cuic was extraditing from Serbia in 2016, pleaded guilty to manslaughter and was sentenced nine-and-a-half years' imprisonment in November 2018. Cuic's associate, Marko Cokara, who was also present at the drug deal, was sentenced to eight years' for manslaughter.

The president and sergeant-at-arms of the Bandidos Brisbane "Northside" chapter were arrested on 20 December 2019 and charged with attempted murder relating to the wounding of a man who was shot in the face and shoulder over a debt in Samsonvale on 13 July 2019. Police also seized handguns, a sawn-off rifle, ammunition, fake IDs, drugs and gang paraphernalia during raids on two properties.

Mario Vosmaer was bashed and shot at after being lured into an ambush by a suspected Comancheros member at his Archerfield car yard on 18 June 2020.

== South Australia ==
In addition to Queensland, the Bandidos have also been declared a criminal organization by South Australia under anti-gang laws. Ten groups in total were targeted by the legislation, which came into effect in August 2015.

== Tasmania ==
Todd Michael Walker, described by police as the Bandidos' Mersey River chapter sergeant-at-arms, was jailed for six months after pleading guilty to firearms trafficking in July 2018. He was convicted of trafficking a Glock nine-millimetre self-loading pistol between April and June 2016.

The Bandidos are designated an outlaw motorcycle gang under laws put in place by the Government of Tasmania in November 2019. The laws ban the wearing of insignias for the Bandidos and four other motorcycle clubs. Two Bandidos members also became the first to be charged under anti-consorting laws for convicted offenders passed in September 2018 when they were arrested in November 2019.

Two members of the Hobart Bandidos chapter were arrested on 16 June 2020 and charged with trafficking a controlled substance following a joint operation between Tasmania Police's Serious Organised Crime Division and the Federal Police National Anti-Gangs Squad. The investigation began after more than 700 grams of methylamphetamine was seized aboard the Spirit of Tasmania in December 2019. On 30 June 2020, the chapter president was also arrested and charged with trafficking offences.

== Victoria ==
A feud between the Bandidos and the Vikings Motorcycle Club began in May 1995 after the Vikings resisted a forced amalgamation by the Bandidos. The Vikings' clubhouse in Ballarat was strafed with gunfire and, in an apparent retaliation, a Bandidos member was targeted in a hit-and-run road incident. The police initiated Operation Barkly in an attempt to stem the violence, and two undercover police officers infiltrated the Ballarat Bandidos chapter as part of the operation, becoming "full patch" members on 21 October 1997. As Bandidos members, the pair were involved in over 30 drug deals in three states, purchasing marijuana, amphetamines, LSD and ecstasy from other club members over a thirteen-month period. Operation Barkly was overseen by detective Bob Armstrong of the Victoria Police. Police ended Operation Barkly due to fears over the safety of the undercover officers after three Bandidos were murdered during the investigation. On 11 December 1997, approximately 100 police officers carried out a series of coordinated raids against the club in four states, arresting 19 people and seizing around $1 million of drugs and $6 million of precursor chemicals in the manufacture of drugs. Also confiscated were numerous weapons, including an AK-47 assault rifle. Bandidos members Peter Skroke and Andrew Michlin were sentenced to six months in prison for methamphetamine trafficking.

Bandidos enforcer Ross "Rosco" Brand died in hospital on 23 October 2008, seven hours after being shot in the head as he left the Bandidos' clubhouse in Geelong. Club associate Paul Szerwinski was also wounded in the shooting. Rebels affiliate John Russell Bedson was convicted of Brand's killing and sentenced to a maximum of twenty-three years in prison in March 2011, while his half-brother, Derek Bedson, pleaded guilty to manslaughter and was sentenced to at least eight years in prison. The attack was carried out in retaliation after a fight broke out between a Death Before Dishonour (DBD, a Rebels-affiliated club) member and a Bandidos prospect earlier that day; the DBD bikie was arrested while the Bandido was not.

Stephen Jones, a former member of both the Rebels and the Bandidos who reportedly left the Bandidos on good terms in 2008, was bashed and robbed of a car and two motorcycles at his Epping, Melbourne home by Bandidos members Taniora Tangaloa, Jack Vaotangi and Jasmin Destanovic on 15 January 2009. Tangaloa, Vaotangi and Destanovic were convicted of armed robbery, aggravated burglary and intentionally causing serious injury in January 2014. Tangaloa and Destanovic were sentenced to eight years' imprisonment while Vaotangi was sentenced to seven-and-a-half years'.

Bandidos national sergeant-at-arms Toby Mitchell survived being shot six times outside a gym near the Bandidos clubhouse in Brunswick, Melbourne on 28 November 2011. He subsequently spent weeks in intensive care, underwent thirty operations and lost a kidney, gall bladder and most of his liver. The shooting remains unsolved, although the Prisoners of War, a Hells Angels-affiliated prison gang, has been linked to the crime. Mitchell survived another attempt on his life when he was shot in the arm as he walked into the clubhouse of the Diablos – a Bandidos support club – in Melton, Melbourne on 1 March 2013. This shooting has also gone unsolved, with the Hells Angels or associates again being suspected. Mitchell left the Bandidos due to ill health in November 2013 and went on to join the Mongols in April 2019.

Bandidos members Luke Maybus and John Peter Walker were convicted of manslaughter for the killing of Michael Strike, a man who had been drunkenly harassing Walkers pet pitbull outside the Bandidos' clubhouse in Melbourne and who was subsequently dragged inside by the pair and beaten to death on 24 May 2014. In March 2016, Maybus and Walker were sentenced to ten and eight-year prison terms, respectively. A third man, Joseph Girgis, was sentenced to six months in prison for assisting Maybus and Walker in the removal of Strike's body from the club's premises. John Peter Walker referred to by his nickname as Johnny 2 statements cooperated with the crown witness regarding this case as well as allegedly made statements regarding the MRC riots when cigarettes were banned. In Australian terminology, this is considered being a Dog.

A man was arrested after police seized steroids and a loaded firearm during a raid of the Bandidos Melbourne chapter clubhouse on 1 August 2019. A property in Doveton was also searched as part of an operation by Echo Taskforce, a police group assigned to bikie-related crimes.

== Western Australia ==
The Bandidos established their first branch in Western Australia by patching-over a Rock Machine chapter in Perth on 20 October 2013.

The vice-president of the Bandidos' Perth chapter was charged with drug and driving offences after he was arrested by police following a high-speed chase in Munster on 12 June 2014. The chapter president was arrested at Perth Airport on 16 June 2014 and charged with possessing a prohibited drug with intent to sell or supply.

The Perth Bandidos chapter patched over to the Rebels in June 2017 after senior Rebels members came to an amicable agreement with the Bandidos' eastern states-based leadership.

== See also ==
- Hells Angels MC criminal allegations and incidents in Australia
