= Coolalinga =

- Suburb
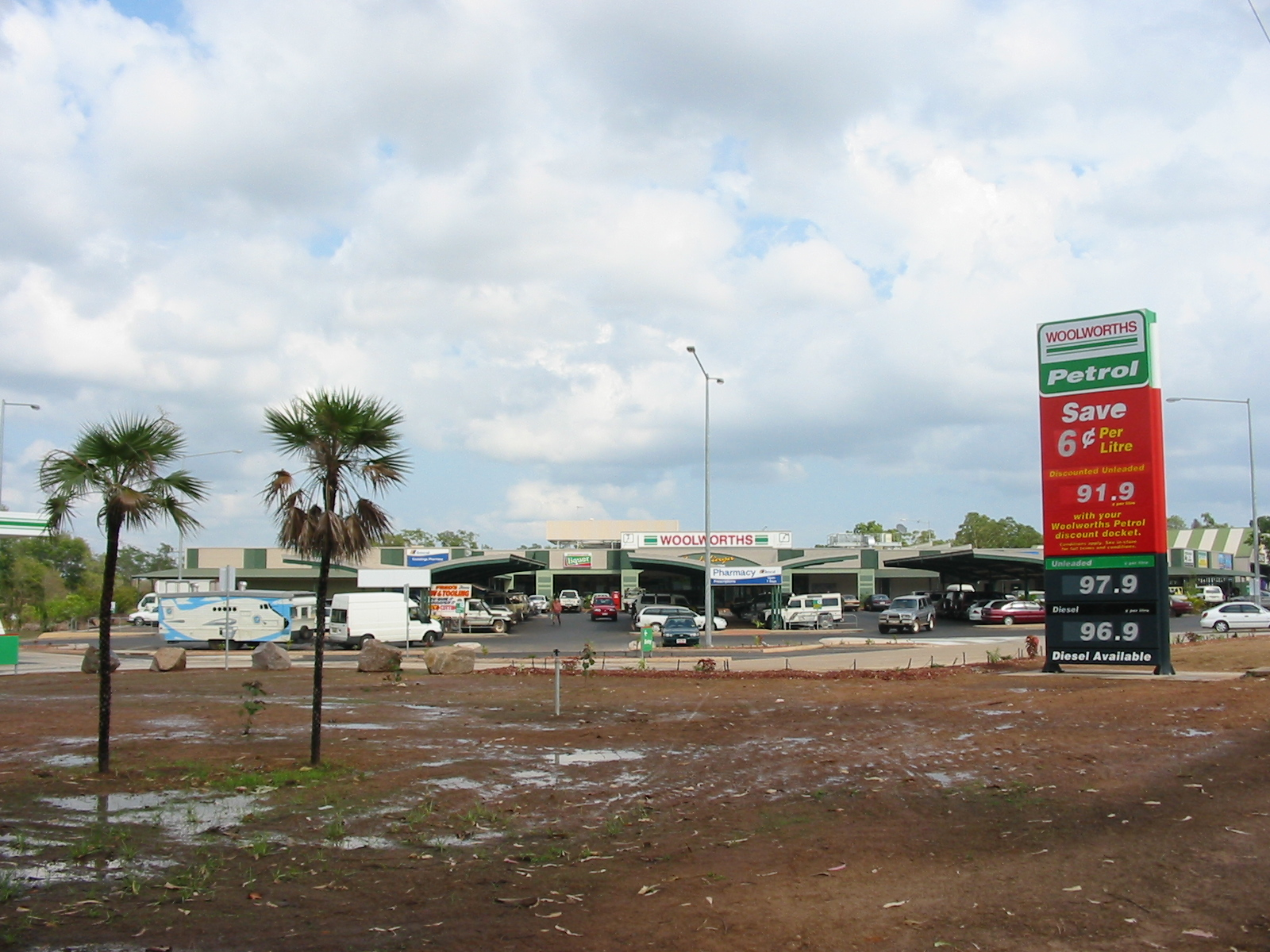
- Coolalinga shopping centre

- Interactive map of Coolalinga
- Coordinates: 12°31′27″S 131°2′32″E
- Country: Australia
- State: Northern Territory
- City: Darwin
- LGA: Litchfield Municipality
- Location: 29.9 km (18.6 mi) from Darwin; 10 km (6.2 mi) from Palmerston

Government
  - Territory electorates: Goyder; Nelson
  - Federal division: Lingiari

Population
  - Total: 548 (2016 census)
- Postcode: 0839
Suburbs around Coolalinga
Howard Springs	Howard Springs	Howard Springs
Howard Springs; Virginia	Coolalinga	Howard Springs
Virginia	Virginia; Freds Pass; McMinns Lagoon	McMinns Lagoon

Coolalinga is an outer suburban area in Darwin. It is 29 kilometres (18 mi) south east of central Darwin, 10 kilometres (6 mi) south east of Palmerston and 6 kilometres (4 mi) east of the proposed city of Weddell. Its Local Government Area is the Litchfield Municipality. The name was first used by Len Cant for his store and caravan park on the Stuart Highway. Since Coolalinga Store, the area has become an important commercial centre for the Shire.

== Commerce ==
Coolalinga is a major service centre for the outer rural Litchfield Shire and is a growing commercial centre. It is home to the Coolalinga Shopping Centre, the largest in the rural area. The shopping centre contains a post office, Woolworths supermarket with liquor and petrol outlets, as well as a pharmacy, cafes and a number of specialty shops.

Outside the main shopping centre are a Veterinary Hospital, the office of the Litchfield Times local newspaper, petrol stations, a caravan park and a number of businesses serving rural industries.

In addition to the existing Woolworths supermarket complex, Darwin-based developer Gwelo constructed the 20,000 m^{2} Coolalinga Shopping Village, which provided the district with another food store, three major national retailers and up to 60 additional specialty stores. The new complex is located on the eastern side of the Stuart Highway and serves the rural suburbs of Litchfield Shire.

As part of the Gwelo development, a 1000 m^{2} block of land has been set aside for the construction of a seven-story office block which it is hoped will lure Northern Territory Government departments looking to move away from the Darwin CBD. The office and shopping complex is expected to provide 1760 new public parking spaces. On adjacent land, Gwelo has been granted approval to provide 150 new homes, in a mixture of single occupancy and medium density buildings. When complete, this will bring over 400 new residents to the suburb.

== Infrastructure ==
=== Health ===
There are no public hospitals in Coolalinga, but for non-urgent consultations, the Coolalinga Medical Centre, a private practice is located on Henning Road. it also has a psychological clinic as part of the health services in Coolalinga. An Amcal pharmacy is in the Coolalinga Shopping Centre. The rural area is served by the Palmerston Health Precinct which includes the Palmerston Community Care Centre, public dental service, St Johns' Ambulance and a Medical Specialists Clinic. Many of these services operate 24 hours. The nearest public hospitals are Palmerston Regional Hospital and Royal Darwin Hospital.

=== Education ===
There are no schools located in Coolalinga, but a public school catering for Transition to year 6 is located in nearby Bees Creek. Bees Creek is also home to the Sattler Christian College (formerly Litchfield Christian School). Taminmin Middle School and Taminmin High School in Humpty Doo cater for years 7–12.

Teritiary and Vocational education services are available through Charles Darwin University, with campuses in both Darwin and Palmerston.

=== Public transport ===
In late 2011, the Northern Territory Government opened a new $1.8 million bus interchange park and ride facility to provide better public transport services for commuters travelling between the rural area, Darwin and Palmerston. This development includes:

- 12m x 13.5m shaded bus/drop off terminal
- CCTV surveillance
- a self-cleaning toilet
- water bubbler
- irrigated landscaping
- secure push bike enclosure
- 60 car park bays
- four motor cycle parking bays

The following bus routes operate to the Coolalinga interchange as of April 2012:

- Express Route 28 – Humpty Doo to Darwin via Coolalinga and Palmerston Interchange (and reverse) – Monday to Friday
- Route 445 – Humpty Doo to Palmerston via Cox Peninsular, Noonamah and Coolalinga (PM service reversed) – Monday to Saturday

In addition to public buses, an asphalt sealed cycle path following the alignment of the closed North Australia Railway links the rural area to Palmerston.
