= COVID-19 pandemic in the Northern Territory =

Ongoing COVID-19 viral pandemic in the Northern Territory

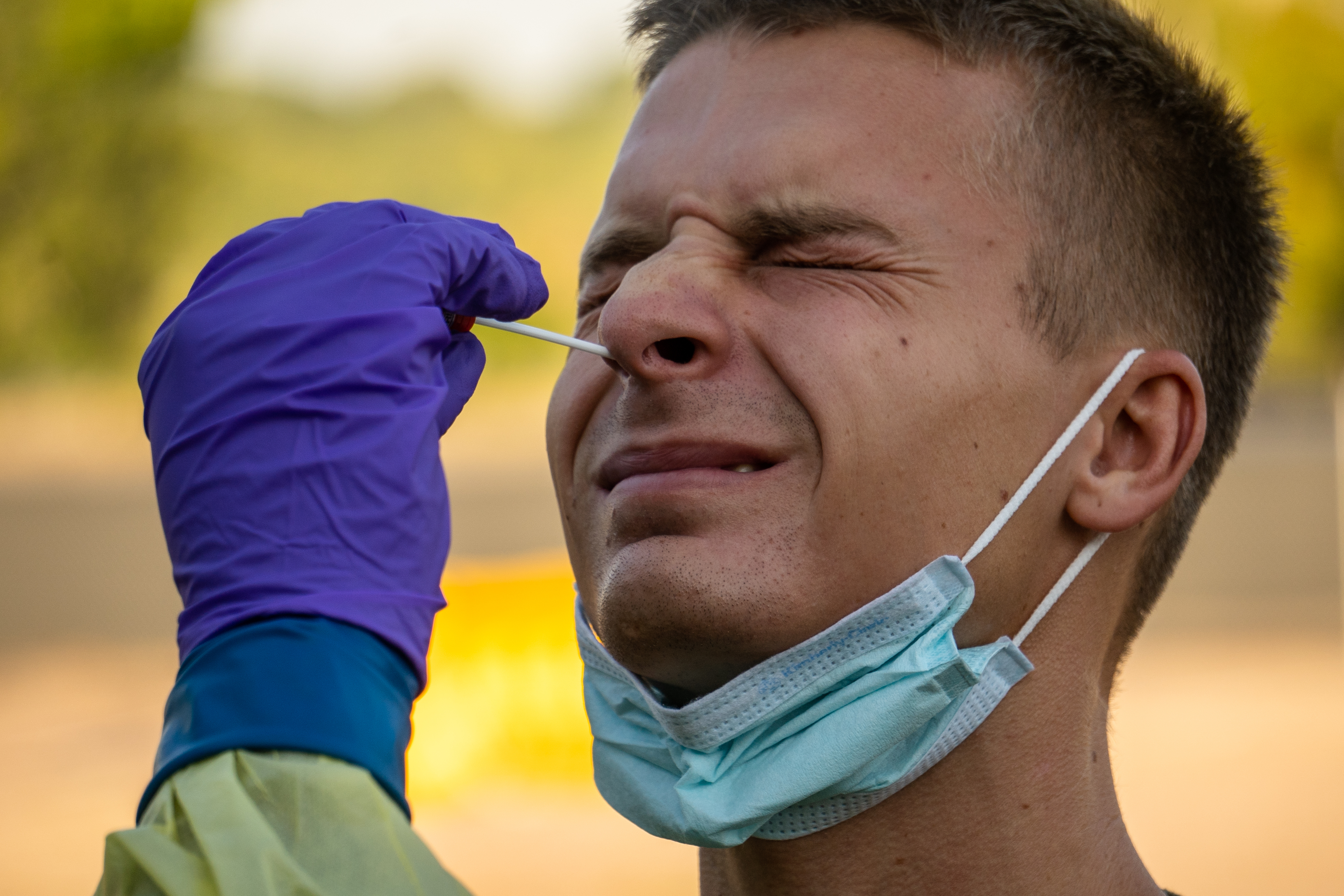
- COVID-19 swab test
- Disease: COVID-19
- Pathogen: SARS-CoV-2
- Location: Northern Territory, Australia
- First outbreak: Tanami Desert; 27 June 2021
- Index case: Darwin CBD
- Arrival date: 4 March 2020
- Confirmed cases: 72,098 (as of 1 June 2022)
- Active cases: 1,562 (as of 1 June 2022)
- Hospitalised cases: 15 (as of 1 June 2022)
- Critical cases: 1 (as of 1 June 2022)
- Recovered: 70,487 (as of 1 June 2022)
- Deaths: 49 (as of 1 June 2022)
- Fatality rate: 0.07%

Government website
- coronavirus.nt.gov.au

The COVID-19 pandemic in the Northern Territory is part of the ongoing worldwide pandemic of the coronavirus disease 2019 (COVID-19) caused by severe acute respiratory syndrome coronavirus 2 (SARS-CoV-2).

== Timeline ==
=== 2020 ===
On 18 March, the Northern Territory government announced an economic stimulus package of A$60 million.

On 24 March 2020, the Northern Territory (NT) government introduced strict border controls, with anyone arriving from abroad or interstate being required to self-isolate for 14 days. The only exemption would be due to health and emergency services, defence and policing, flight crews and freight, and based on "compassionate grounds". NT Police Commissioner Jamie Chalker said that the local police and government were likely to impose these measures until September. Anyone arriving in NT had to declare that they would isolate for 14 days and let the authorities know of their location during that period at the point of entry. Failure to comply with the new regulations could result in denying entry or a fine of A$62,800. Furthermore, all non-essential travel to the NT's 76 remote communities was banned.

From midday on 1 May, some internal restrictions in NT were eased.

=== 2021 ===
On 3 February 2021, after a quarantine hotel worker at the Grand Hyatt Melbourne, involved in the Australian Open tennis quarantine program, was found to have COVID-19, Victoria reintroduced some rules, and delayed the imminent easing of some restrictions. On 4 February 2021 the Northern Territory responded to the Melbourne situation by declaring ten suburbs in Melbourne to be hotspots. From 3:30 pm (Australian Central Standard Time–ACST), arrivals into NT from Melbourne, West Melbourne, Noble Park, Keysborough, Springvale, Brighton, Wheelers Hill, Clayton South, Heatherton or Moorabbin will be required to go into mandatory quarantine for 14 days. Those already in NT who have been in an any of the hotspots since 29 January will also have to self-isolate until their COVID-19 testing is negative.

On 22 February, the first COVID-19 vaccinations (phase 1A) in the NT were administered to "at-risk frontline workers" using the Pfizer–BioNTech COVID-19 vaccine.

By 7 June more than 10,000 Northern Territorians had been fully vaccinated. The NT vaccination program was extended to anyone in Darwin and Palmerston over 16 years-of-age from 8 June. Previously, those over 16 could usually only book for the vaccine if they lived in regional parts of the NT, such as Alice Springs and Katherine.

Due to a growing cluster in Bondi, Sydney, from 6pm (local) on 24 June, the Northern Territory declared all of Greater Sydney a hotspot. Any person entering NT from Sydney will have to quarantine for 14 days.

==== Granites mine outbreak ====
On 26 June the Granites gold mine went into lockdown after a worker tested positive for COVID-19. The mine is 540 km (340 mi) north-west of Alice Springs. About 750 FIFO (fly-in/fly-out) workers onsite were affected, while about 900 who left the site recently had to go into isolation, 259 in NT, but 650 went elsewhere throughout Australia. By 27 June there were 5 cases linked to the mine.

From 1pm on 27 June, Darwin went into a 'snap' lockdown, for at least 48 hours, after more COVID-19 cases were confirmed that were linked to the Granites gold mine case. They were believed to be of the Delta COVID-19 variant. The affected areas are the Darwin, Palmerston and Litchfield council areas.
During the lockdown people may only leave their homes for five reasons:

- For essential work
- Medical treatment
  - including coronavirus testing and vaccinations
- To obtain essential goods and services
- For exercise,
  - one hour daily
  - within a 5 km radius
- To care for people who cannot support themselves.

Masks were mandatory outside the home.

On 28 June, as the mine COVID cluster in NT had grown to 7 cases, the lockdown in Darwin was extended by 72 hours to 1pm on 2 July. The fireworks for Territory Day on 1 July were postponed.

By 8 July, there were 19 cases, in NT, New South Wales, Queensland and South Australia, linked to the Granite's Mine outbreak.

==== Lockdown in August ====
On 16 August Greater Darwin and the Katherine region went into another snap lockdown due to end at mid-day on 19 August. This followed one new COVID case who was infectious in the community for several days. He was an international arrival, coming from the U.S. to Australia and NT for legitimate work purposes, who had already quarantined in Sydney and tested negative there. The lockdown boundaries for Greater Darwin included Dundee Beach, Palmerston, and Wagait Beach. For Katherine boundaries were the municipality of Katherine plus Tindal. It was reported on 19 August 2021 that NT authorities do not know how the man became infected, but raised the possibility it may have occurred while transiting through Sydney or Canberra airports, or in hotel quarantine.

The lockdown was lifted as scheduled in Darwin, but in Katherine it was extended for 24 hours. Wastewater testing for COVID-19 had shown a positive result in Katherine. Some restrictions were to remain until noon on 26 August:

- in public masks must be worn where 1.5 metres of distance cannot be kept
  - and at workplaces when distancing isn't possible
- contact sports, gyms and markets to stay closed another seven days.
- 10 visitor limit at private residences

The Darwin Festival can proceed, but eating and drinking restrictions will remain in force.

Following the lockdowns, from 5:00pm ACST, NT declared Sydney and Canberra airports to be COVID hotspots.

==== Lockdown and lockout in November ====
On 4 November, the NT recorded its first case of COVID-19 community transmission, when a person who had spent time in Katherine and Greater Darwin tested positive. As a result, Katherine entered lockdown while the Greater Darwin region entered lockout. The primary infection case was traced to a person who "almost certainly" contracted the virus in Melbourne, Victoria, but failed to declare their presence in Melbourne to NT authorities when flying into Darwin. The lockdown in Katherine transitioned into a lockout on 7 November, which was then lifted on 8 November, while the lockout in Darwin was lifted on 9 November.

On 15 November, the NT recorded two new cases, one in Katherine and one in Robinson River, Northern Territory, a remote community about 800 kilometres east of Katherine. Both Greater Katherine and Robinson River and its surrounding homelands entered lockdown. The outbreak was later confirmed to be linked to the cluster in Katherine and Darwin earlier in the month. On 20 November, nine positive cases were recorded in Binjari, a community on the outskirts of Katherine; both Binjari and the neighbouring community of Rockhole were placed into "hard lockdown". On 27 November, Greater Katherine including Rockhole moved into a lockout; Binjari remained on lockdown. Robinson River also exited lockdown, while Lajamanu, a community about 560 km south-west of Katherine, entered lockdown on the night of 27 November, after COVID-19 fragments were found in its wastewater.

On 29 November, a positive case of the SARS-CoV-2 Omicron variant was recorded at the Howard Springs quarantine facility, from a return traveller who arrived at Darwin from Johannesburg, South Africa on 25 November.

==== December ====
On 1 December, Lajamanu's lockdown was downgraded to a lockout, and Robinson River moved out of lockout. On 2 December, a positive case was recorded at Lajamanu. Binjari's hard lockdown was moved to a standard lockdown.

On 3 December, the NT recorded its first COVID-19 death, a 78-year-old woman from Binjari. The woman was not vaccinated, and died in Royal Darwin Hospital.

On 17 December, Tennant Creek entered lockdown after four cases were recorded. On 19 December, Ali Curung entered lockdown after one case was found.

On 31 December, after a territory daily record of 30 new cases, an indoor mask mandate across the territory was introduced from 6pm. New cases were found in Darwin, Katherine, and Tennant Creek.

== 2022 ==
On 6 January, from 1pm, a lockout was implemented over the entire Territory until mid-day on 9 January. A vaccine pass system came into effect at that time as well. Everyone in the NT will have to show proof of their COVID-19 vaccination status before being be allowed to enter venues such as casinos, cinemas, clubs, pubs and restaurants. The pass system will also apply to ticketed events, above 500 patrons in urban areas, in regional or remote areas more than 1,000 patrons.

On 15 January the territory's second COVID related death was reported. The woman was 40 years old, fully vaccinated, but no booster. She had underlying health conditions and died in Royal Darwin Hospital.

By this day the territory had 3,730 active cases of COVID, most in Greater Darwin. 412 new cases were reported to 8pm on 14 January, and 32 cases were hospitalised, with none in intensive care.

On 16 January, at 3pm Alice Springs entered a 'lockout', wherein those not fully vaccinated must remain in isolation, under similar conditions to a general COVID lockdown. Outbreaks have occurred in Alice Springs and Darwin prisons, aged care facilities and a renal hostel in Alice Springs. The restrictions are due to be lifted at 3pm on 23 January.

On 31 January another COVID related death occurred, NTs' third, at the Alice Springs Hospital. The death was a woman from the remote Aboriginal community of Mutitjulu, near Uluru / Ayer's Rock. She had received 1 dose of COVID vaccine.

On 2 February NT had its fourth COVID related death, a man his 80s. He died at Old Timers Aged Care Service in Alice Springs where he lived. He was not vaccinated and also had underlying health conditions. By that day the territory had 6,576 active cases of COVID. 1,201 new cases were reported and 129 cases were hospitalised, with 5 in intensive care, 13 on oxygen.

On 4 February NT had its fifth COVID related death, a man his 60s. He was from the remote NT community of Kintore and had underlying health conditions.

By 5 February the territory had 7,372 active cases of COVID. 867 new cases were reported, for 22,492 total since March 2020. 129 cases were hospitalised, with 28 in intensive care, 3 on oxygen.

== Event cancellations ==
- The 2020 Barunga Festival was postponed from June to September, then cancelled due to the COVID-19 pandemic. The 2021 event went ahead on 11–13 June, with interstate patron numbers limited by the organisers. Some local Indigenous groups did not attend due to caution over COVID-19.
- In 2020 the Finke Desert Race was cancelled, for the first time, due to the COVID-19 pandemic. This cost the economy of Alice Springs about A$8 million.
- In 2020, the National NAIDOC Awards, and the Awards ceremony, due for November in Mparntwe (Alice Springs) after already being postponed from 11 July, were cancelled in August 2020 due to the "... uncertainty of travel restrictions, quarantining, and physical distancing requirements."
- In 2021, all celebrations for Territory Day, celebrated on 1 July, were postponed due to an outbreak at The Granites gold mine in NT that resulted in Greater Darwin being locked down.
- In 2020 and 2021, the Garma Festival of Traditional Cultures in August was cancelled. The 2021 cancellation was largely due to a growing outbreak in late May in Victoria. The NT Chief Health Officer decided the remote location of the festival posed a public health risk if an outbreak occurred there.
- In 2021 the National NAIDOC Awards ceremony, set for 3 July in Alice Springs, was cancelled for the second year. An event was then planned for 3 July at the Sydney Opera House. However, Sydney went into a COVID lockdown on 23 June, and COVID rules for travellers returning to NT from NSW and Greater Sydney meant that most people could not attend without a 14-day quarantine. On 25 June 2021 the Sydney ceremony was postponed.
- In 2021 the National Indigenous Music Awards, set for 7 August, were postponed on 28 July to later in the year due to the Delta outbreak in NSW.

== Statistics ==
COVID-19 cumulative cases in the Northern Territory

View source data.

COVID-19 daily cases in the Northern Territory

View source data.

== See also ==
- Timeline of the COVID-19 pandemic in Australia
- COVID-19 pandemic in Australia
- COVID-19 pandemic
