= Bees Creek =

- Suburb
- Coordinates: 12°33′19″S 131°03′33″E
- Country: Australia
- State: Northern Territory
- City: Darwin
- LGA: Litchfield Municipality
- Location: 33.7 km (20.9 mi) from Darwin; 13.8 km (8.6 mi) from Palmerston
- Established: 1869

Government
  - Territory electorate: Goyder
  - Federal division: Lingiari

Population
  - Total: 838 (2016 census)
- Postcode: 0822
Suburbs around Bees Creek
Virginia	Freds Pass; McMinns Lagoon	McMinns Lagoon
Virginia; Weddell	Bees Creek	McMinns Lagoon; Humpty Doo
Weddell	Weddell	Noonamah

Bees Creek is an outer rural area of Darwin, Northern Territory, Australia. It is 33 km southeast of the Darwin central business district. It is the council seat of the local government area of the Litchfield Municipality, although most council facilities, public amenities and the actual Municipal offices are in the neighbouring locality of Freds Pass. Bees Creek is mostly rural, with large residential blocks often not served by town sewers or sealed roads. Nevertheless, the area is popular with those wishing to enjoy a rural lifestyle within an easy commuting distance of the city.

== History ==
Settlement of the suburb as well as nearby Virginia began in 1869, after George Goyder surveyed the small area surrounding Virginia. Its name follows that of a stream surveyed by George G. McLachlan of Goyder's No. 6 Survey Party of 1869, and named for McLachlan's cadet, Tom Bee (4 July 1850 – 21 November 1919)

In 1915 a rail siding named Wishart Siding (also known as 22 mile, the distance from the railhead at Darwin) after a contractor who built the first rail jetty at Port Darwin, opened on the North Australia Railway was established at a site approximately 2 km (1.2 mi) from Bees Creek. The siding served primarily as an accommodation facility for railway maintenance gangs who worked the line south to the town of Adelaide River The camp was expanded with additional accommodation buildings between 1946 and 1949, and closed with the rest of the line in 1976. The entire precinct is now heritage listed for its architectural and historical significance to the line. It is the only facility remaining of its kind along the alignment of the former railway.

== Population ==
In the 2016 Census, there were 838 people in Bees Creek. 75.9% of people were born in Australia and 89.2% of people spoke only English at home. The most common responses for religion were No Religion 42.5%, Catholic 19.5% and Anglican 13.0%.

== Infrastructure ==
=== Health ===
The nearest GP clinics to Bees Creek are the Coolalinga Medical Centre, in Coolalinga and Arafura Medical Clinics in Humpty Doo.

There are no public hospitals in Bees Creek. Several pharmacies are located in surrounding suburbs. The rural area is serviced by the Palmerston Health Precinct which includes the Palmerston Community Care Centre, public dental service, St Johns' Ambulance and a Medical Specialists Clinic. Many of these services operate 24 hours. The nearest Public Hospital is Palmerston Regional Hospital.

=== Education ===
There is one government primary school located in the suburb, Bees Creek Primary School catering to students from Transition to Year 6. the enrollment is drawn mainly from Bees Creek itself, as well as the neighbouring suburb of Virginia. The school opened in 1997, and also offers an after hours child minding service. The school motto is "Harmony through CARE". A pre-school is also located on the school grounds. Across the road is a child care centre, a facility utilised by many parents who commute to work in Darwin.

Sattler Christian College, formerly known as Litchfield Christian School is a small private school located in Bees Creek, providing alternative -education for primary (Transition – Year 6) and middle school (years 7–9) aged children. Total enrollment as of 2010 was 119 students. The school also provides a pre-school and after hours child care. The school motto is "Growing in Wisdom, Learning to Love". The principal is Mr. Colin Smith.

There are no public middle or high schools located in Bees Creek, but Taminmin Middle School and Taminmin High School in Humpty Doo cater for students in years 7–12 who reside in Darwin's rural area.

Teritiary and Vocational education services are available through Charles Darwin University, with campuses in both Darwin and Palmerston.

=== Public transport ===
Darwinbus route 446 connects Bees Creek to the Palmerston Bus Interchange. The service operates Monday – Saturday, typically two or three times per day in each direction, with additional services provided during the school term. No service is provided on Sunday or Public Holidays.

On the day of the 2016 Census, 79.2% of employed people aged 15 and over travelled to work by car (either as driver or as passenger).

=== Parks and recreation ===
Freds Pass Reserve is a sporting facility which serves the Litchfield Shire. Established in 1977, it is home to 23 sporting and social clubs, and hosts many community events. The reserve hosts the annual Freds Pass Rural Show. Facilities on the site include a multi purpose indoor sports complex, office buildings for resident clubs, a caravan park, playing fields with night lighting, and a recently opened paintball complex. There are also public barbecues, picnic areas and ablutions located on the reserve.

=== Utilities ===
PowerWater's McMinn Pumping Station is located adjacent to the Freds Pass Reserve. This facility was commissioned in 1965. It was expanded in 1983 with the addition of two vertical shaft-driven pumps. The site consists of two pumping stations and a storage reservoir. The facility is supplies water to the entire Darwin and Palmerston metropolitan area. A recent $13 million overhaul of the facility was completed without interruption to the water supply.

== See also ==
- Sattler Airfield
