= McMinns Lagoon =

- Suburb
- Coordinates: 12.555285°S 131.068505°E
- Country: Australia
- State: Northern Territory
- City: Darwin
- LGA: Litchfield Municipality
- Location: 34 km (21 mi) from Darwin; 14.1 km (8.8 mi) from Palmerston

Government
  - Territory electorates: Goyder; Nelson
  - Federal division: Lingiari

Population
  - Total: 796 (2016 census)
- Postcode: 0822
Suburbs around McMinns Lagoon
Coolalinga	Coolalinga; Howard Springs; Girraween	Girraween
Freds Pass; Bees Creek	McMinns Lagoon	Girraween; Humpty Doo
Bees Creek	Humpty Doo	Humpty Doo

McMinns Lagoon is an outer suburban area in Darwin. It appeared on Goyder's plan of the Survey of Port Darwin and Environs in 1869. The McMinns Lagoon Recreation Reserve is located in the area.
