= Carl Atkinson =

Australian diver and salvage expert

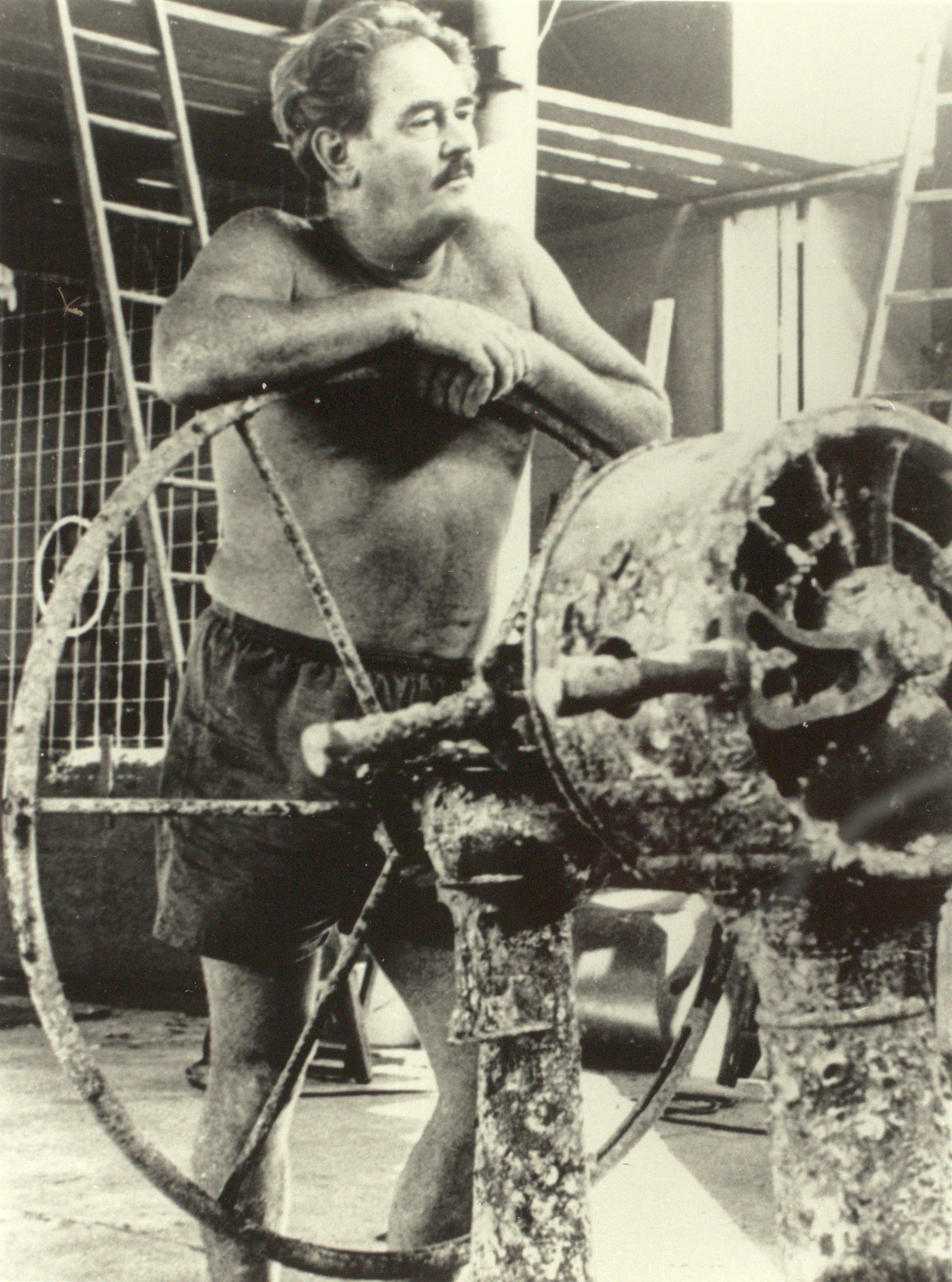
- Carl Atkinson with the wheel from USS Peary, sunk in Darwin Harbour

Personal details
- Born: Carl Atkinson
- Died: 1985
- Occupation: Diver and salvaging

Carl Atkinson (died 1985) was an Australian diver and salvage expert from Darwin in the Northern Territory of Australia.

== Diving ==
Atkinson lived at Doctors Gully from 1945 to 1979, where he lived with his pet crocodile named Cuthbert, a snake named Sammy and many dogs. He is attributed with starting the practice of fish feeding, which locals and visitors to Doctors Gully continue to do today.

Atkinson was an experienced diver for decades. He assisted police on several occasions with search and retrieval work.

Atkinson built a decompression chamber which was used by Japanese pearl divers to prevent suffering the ‘bends’ after diving. He is known to have saved at least 16 pearl divers' lives with this equipment.

== Salvage work ==
After World War II, Atkinson began acquiring the rights to salvage Darwin's wartime wrecks. With permission from the US Government, he salvaged the cargo of USAT Meigs in 1946 including Jeeps, Ford and Chevrolet trucks. Controversy erupted when Atkinson was required to pay heavy duty sales tax on the cargo. He nearly died during the salvage mission when his speedboat sank, leaving him adrift in Darwin Harbour for 11 hours.

He also discovered the location of USS Peary. In 1958, Atkinson sold the salvage rights to four wrecks to Japanese company Nanyo Boeki Kaisha Ltd, ahead of the Fujita salvage operation in 1959.
