= Doctors Gully =

Enclave in Darwin, Northern Territory

- Gully
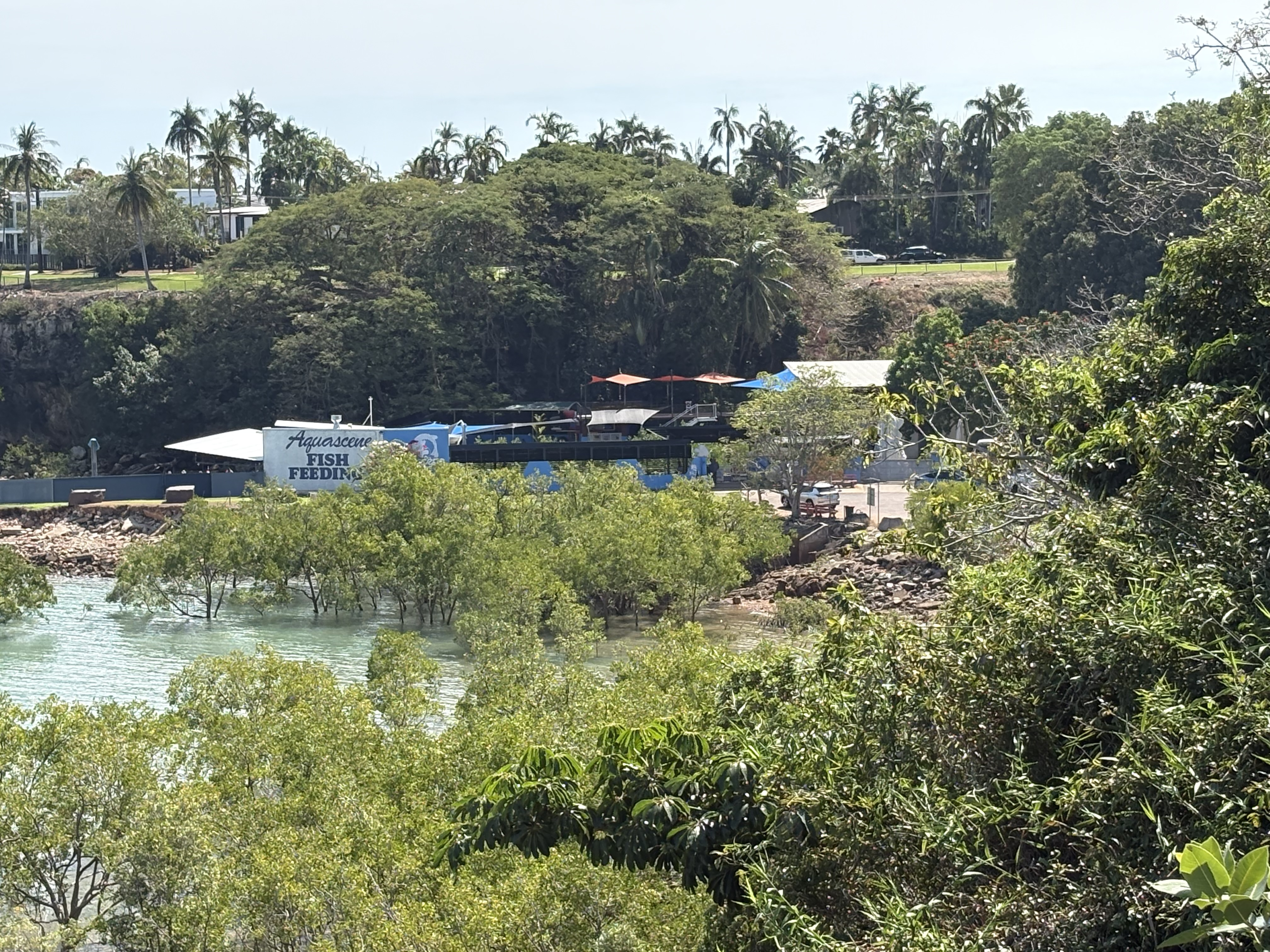
- Doctors Gully from the south
- Interactive map of Doctors Gully
- Coordinates: 12°27′31″S 130°49′18″E
- Location: Darwin
- Water bodies: Darwin Harbour
- Geology: fine-grained Cretaceous sediments

Area
  - Total: 4290 sqm

Dimensions
  - Length: 400m
- Elevation: 20 m (66 ft)

Doctors Gully is a small but historically significant coastal enclave and aquatic reserve in Larrakeyah, Australia, close to Darwin’s city centre and overlooking Darwin Harbour. Positioned between Fort Hill and Point Emery, the area combines harbour scenery, early settlement history, wartime heritage and, in modern times, is home to a fish feeding sanctuary.

== History ==
The Larrakia people are the Traditional Custodians of the Darwin region and inhibated the area for man thousands of years before European settlement. Doctors Gully was named after Dr Robert Peel, the surgeon on the SS Moonta (under George Goyder which arrived from Adelaide to create a settlement in area. Doctors Gully was the site of Peel’s Well, one of the settlement’s first freshwater sources which was originally sourced by Peel after the boat landing.

The area was subsequently used for Chinese market gardens and was the original location of Royal Darwin Hospital. During World War II, Doctors Gully also formed part of Darwin’s wartime defence network as a support base for Catalina flying boats, including the “Black Cat” squadrons that undertook reconnaissance and mine-laying operations across the Pacific.

Carl Atkinson lived at, and retained a lease for, Doctors Gully between 1945 and 1979. He salvaged wrecks of vessels in Darwin Harbour, including that of the Sea Fox, which belonged to John Calvert, a famous American magician. Atkinson is credited with the decision to open Doctors Gully up to fish feeding for the general public.

== Modern times ==
The feature of the area is now the Aquascene Fish Feeding sanctuary.

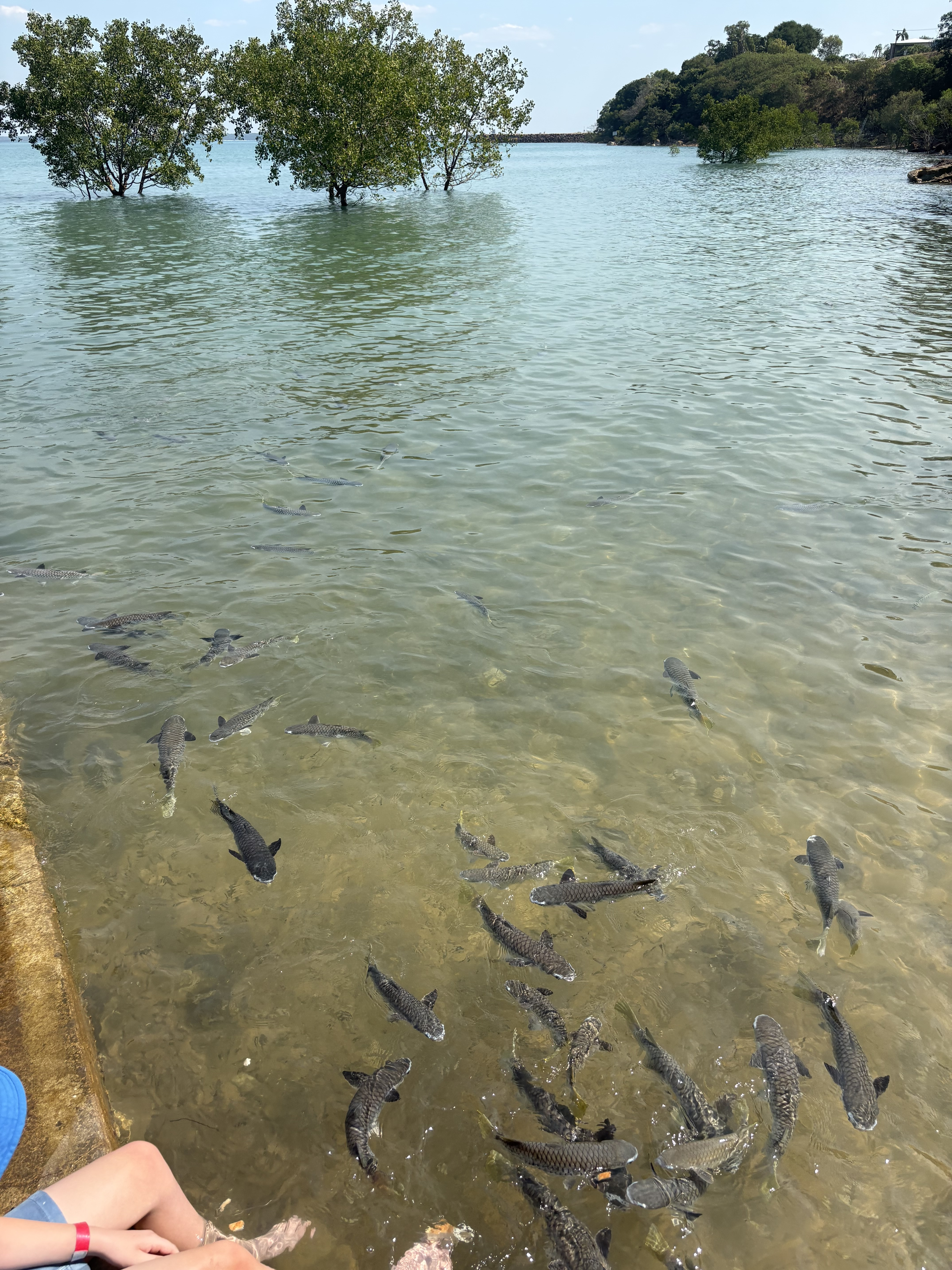
Fish feeding at Aquascene with mangrove trees pictured

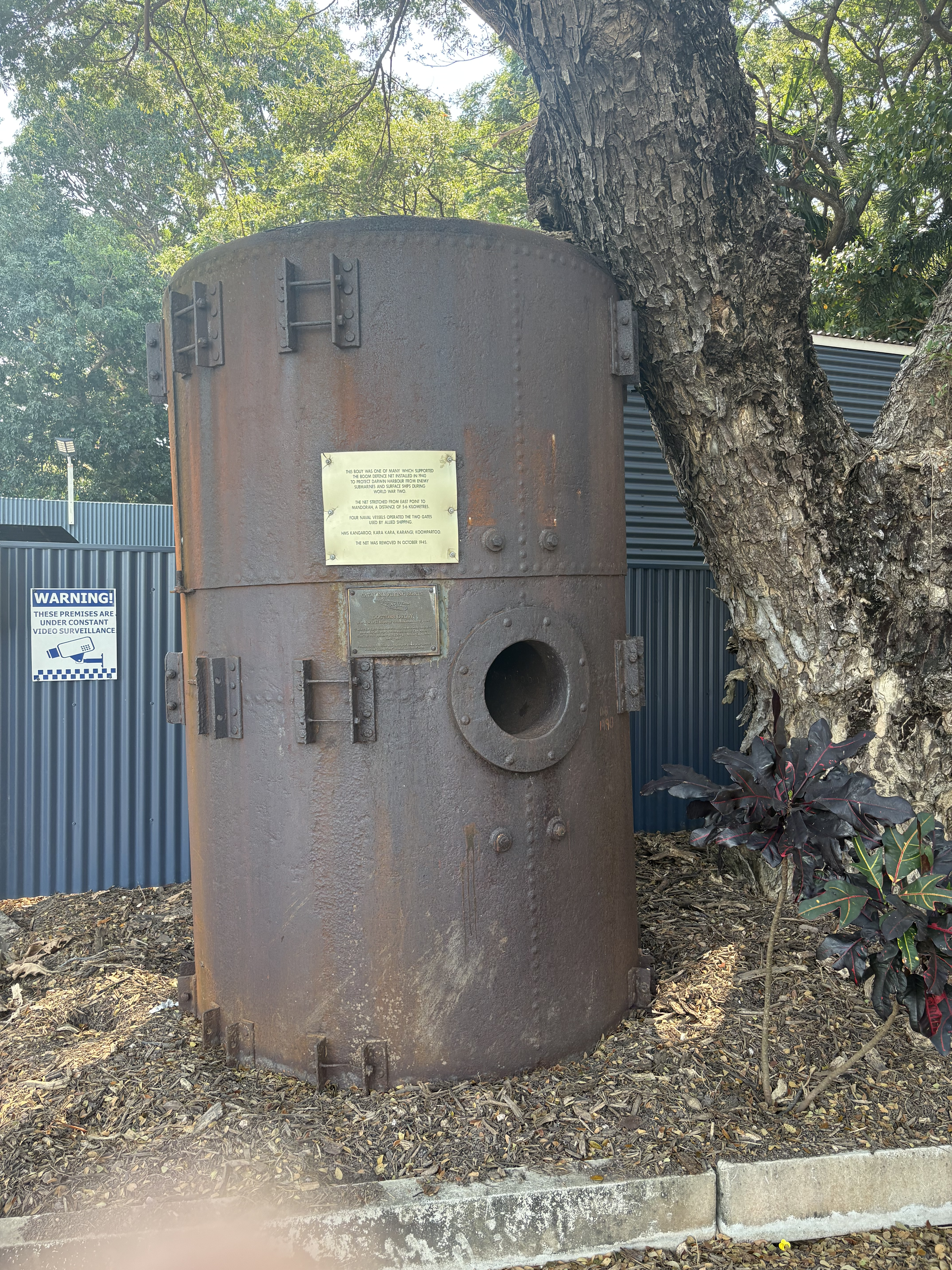
Metal buoy which was part of Darwin Harbour World War II defence net

Visitors can hand feed milkfish, diamond-scaled mullet, catfish, tiger scats, shovel-nose rays and barramundi during high tide around mangrove trees.

Although the area theoretically is subject to marine hazards such as box jellyfish and crocodiles, the staff of the sanctuary are able to ensure feeding is safe.

There is a heritage walking route through rainforest featuring Peel’s well and the opportunity to visualise relics from World War II including buoys, oil tanks, and Catalina base history with plaques explaining the features to visitors.
