= Freds Pass =

- Suburb
- Coordinates: 12°32′23.41″S 131°03′18.13″E
- Country: Australia
- State: Northern Territory
- City: Darwin
- LGA: Litchfield Municipality

Government
  - Territory electorate: Goyder
  - Federal division: Lingiari

Population
  - Total: 24 (2016 census)
Suburbs around Freds Pass
Coolalinga	Coolalinga	Coolalinga
Virginia	Freds Pass	McMinns Lagoon
Virginia	Virginia; Bees Creek	McMinns Lagoon; Bees Creek

Freds Pass is an outer rural locality in Darwin. The name Fred's Pass originally referred to a gap in the Daly Ranges through which the Fred's Pass Road (later part of the Stuart Highway, since bypassed) ran, and was named by surveyor W. P. Auld for his fellow-explorer Fred Litchfield, whose name is also commemorated in the nearby Litchfield shire.

== Events ==
The Freds Pass Rural Show is held each May at the beginning of the dry season at Freds Pass Reserve. The event was first held in 1978 as a school fete and has continued grow over the years. In 2009, the show played host to over 200 exhibitors and attracted over 20,000 visitors. The show celebrates and exhibits achievements in local agriculture, horticulture, sport and community endeavours, as well as featuring many sideshows, rides and demonstrations.

The Rural Show attracts visitors from all over the Northern Territory, and is a family oriented event. The Northern Territory Government runs free busses to the reserve during the show.
