= Virginia, Northern Territory =

Virginia Darwin, Northern Territory
- Coordinates: 12°32′41″S 131°01′09″E
- Population: 1,836 (2016 census)
- Established: 1869
- Postcode(s): 0834
- Location: 31.3 km (19 mi) from Darwin City; 11.4 km (7 mi) from Palmerston
- LGA(s): Litchfield Municipality
- Territory electorate(s): Goyder
- Federal division(s): Lingiari
Suburbs around Virginia:
Zuccoli	Howard Springs; Coolalinga	Coolalinga
Zuccoli; Mitchell; Weddell	Virginia	Coolalinga; Freds Pass; Bees Creek
Weddell	Weddell	Weddell; Bees Creek
- Footnotes: Adjoining suburbs

Virginia is a locality in the Northern Territory of Australia located about 31 kilometres (19 mi) south east of the Darwin CBD. Its Local Government Area is the Litchfield Municipality. The suburb is mostly a rural area, but has been experiencing strong growth in population and development. Settlement of the suburb began in 1869, after George McLachlan surveyed the small satellite town. Virginia has been used as a name for the area since the 1870s.
