= Peter John Hill =

Australian outlaw biker and gangster

Peter John Hill (born 1953) is an Australian former outlaw biker and gangster.

== Hells Angels ==
Hill was born into a very wealthy family in Melbourne. His father, Roger was a senior executive with the Australia and New Zealand Bank while his mother Audrey was a prominent socialite in Melbourne high society. Despite his family's wealth and growing up in a loving family, Hill chose a life of crime. In a 2006 interview with the Canadian journalists Julian Sher and William Marsden, Hill stated of his youth: "It was party time. Parties, women, bikes, fast, all the good things in life, when you are young, Live for the moment, I did that for fourteen years. It was a big slice of my life. It was a lot of fun. I thought so at the time, anyway". Sher and Marsden described Hill in the 1970s as a tall, lean man with long, curly black hair, a prominent nose, a narrowly formed face with "determined eyes" and "a hint of a smile". In 2006, Sher and Marsden wrote that for besides for being balding that Hill was very still the same man as he had been in the 1970s as he came across as a "party animal". The policeman Steele Waterman stated in 2019: "Peter had an infectious personality. He fell in love with bikies. He joined them when they were just a bunch of baggy-arsed kids hanging out the front of a hamburger shop". Hill also told Sher and Marsden that his parents were "far from impressed" with his career choices. Hill joined an outlaw biker gang, the Phantoms Motorcycle Club, that "patched over" in 1972 to become the Hells Angels Melbourne chapter.

Hill rejected the values of his upper-class family and had a tattoo inked on his arm that read: "Yea, though I walk through the valley of the shadow of death I fear no evil because I am the evilest motherfucker who ever walked through the Valley". Hill was known as a joker who seemed to take nothing seriously. Hill laughed when the police raided his house to seize $10, 000 Australian dollars along with a package of amphetamine, and invited the arresting officers over for tea. Despite his persona, Hill was seriously about taking over the amphetamine business in Australia as he told Sher and Marsden: "The Hells Angels wanted to become the dominant club in Australia, which created a lot of animosity and resentment. We had a strategy for expansion. It was a desire to control the drug business. We set up a structure to sell all over Australia and get the other clubs to distribute it on the street".

From 1975 onward, Hill was pursued by his nemesis, Sergeant Robert "Bob" Armstrong of the Victoria Police, who kept up his pursuit of Hill despite being a bevy of death threats from the Hells Angels. During his raids on the homes of the Hells Angels, Armstrong discovered guns, false driver's licenses, stolen jewelry, a manual entitled Speed make easy: how to manufacture amphetamines, and primitive labs for manufacturing amphetamines, commonly known as "speed" in Australia. Armstrong gave a press conference on television where he accused the Melbourne chapter of gun-running and selling amphetamines, which led Hill as chapter president to sue him for slander of himself and the rest of his chapter.The defamation lawsuit was dropped when the judge ruled that the Melbourne chapter of the Hells Angels were so infamous that they had no reputation to defame. In spite of the judge's ruling, Armstrong recalled: "That [the defamation lawsuit] got up my nose. That's where it started".

== The "Speed King" ==
Hill visited the United States several times in the late 1970s under a forged passport to meet several leaders of the Angels' Oakland chapter, which is considered to be the "mother chapter" to all the Hells Angels in the world. Hill visited Oakland four times. During his trip to California, Hill attracted attention by renting a Diamond Jubilee Thunderbird automobile while giving as his address to the car rental company the address of the Oakland chapter. When Hill's automobile was parked at a Hells Angels run, his license plate was written by a policeman. When Hill was pulled by a patrolman of the California Highway Patrol, Hill gave him a false address of the building right next to the Oakland chapter, which attracted further attention of the American authorities.

Kenny "Old Man" Maxwell, a former chemist for the Royal Dutch Shell Oil company, had started to work for the Hells Angels. Maxwell also trained three members of the Oakland chapter, James Brandes, Sergei Walton and Kenny Owen into how to make amphetamines. Manufacturing amphetamines required considerable skill as carelessness could easily cause a fire or explosion. Hill became a close friend of Brandes who arranged for him to meet Walton in prison. Hill's car was observed to be often parked in the driveway of Brandes's house. Walton described at length to Hill the best way to safety and economically manufacture amphetamines. In return, Hill agreed to buy in bulk the chemical phenyl-2-propanone (P2P), which was crucial for manufacturing amphetamines and was legal in Australia at the time to smuggle into the United States.

Upon returning to Melbourne, Hill had P2P smuggled into the United States by draining the pineapple juice from the three-liter Golden Circle cans and replacing the juice with P2P. Between 1980 and 1982, Hill was responsible for smuggling 300 liters of P2P into the United States, which provided enough P2P to manufacture about US$50 million worth of amphetamines. Hill received no share of the profits from the amphetamine sales in the United States as he was told that shipping P2P was his contribution to the legal defense fund of Hells Angels international president Sonny Barger and other Hells Angels leaders who been tried on RICO charges. In exchange for helping to pay Barger's legal fees, Hill and the others were allowed to continue to wear their Hells Angels patches. Hill stated: "The recipe from the United States was the actual starting point, and it was a matter of teaching ourselves how to use the various chemicals involved. He [Walton] was the only one who knew how to do it." Together with three Hells Angels of the Melbourne chapter, Ray Hamment, John Madden and Roger Biddlestone, Hill built a lab for manufacturing amphetamines. With the start-up capital of $15, 000 Australian dollars raised by the sale of stolen motorcycles, Hill and the others opened their amphetamines-manufacturing lab in late 1980. The P2P he used came from the Calaire Chemical Company of Calais, France while the uncle of the Hells Angel Terry "Pop" Faulkner provided the necessary import license. Profits from the sales of the amphetamines were split equally four ways while Faulkner received a commission for importing the P2P from France. Faulkner consistently lied to Hill about the cost of the importing P2P to take greater commission than what he was entitled to. Some of the profits from the sale of amphetamines was used to buy real estate for the Melbourne chapter while Hill used some of his share of the profits to put on several well-received rock concerts. Hill stated: "Without the cover of the club we wouldn't have been able to do it and distribute it. Without the club, it would have been a lot more difficult". Hill came to be known as "the Speed King".

The first lab used by Hill was in a house in Belgrave, a suburb of Melbourne. However, the Angels soon discovered the distinctive bad smell caused by manufacturing amphetamines attracted too much attention. Hill rented a house called Greenslopes in a rural area outside of the village of Wattle Glen. Hill and his team could cook about five pounds of amphetamines in about 24 hours. Hill covered the windows with black plastic garbage bags and sealed the doors. The fumes from cooking amphetamines were so toxic that the chrome on the fans that he installed inside were all eaten away. Hill and the others had to wear gas masks for their protection. The price for 1 pound of amphetamines was $10, 000 Australian dollars, but as the demand was huge, Hill soon raised his price to $12, 000 Australian dollars per 1 pound. To increase his production, Hill replaced his fiver-litre reactor vessel with twenty-litre reactor vessel, which allowed him to substantially increase production. Hill reduced the purity of his amphetamines "out of greed" as he put it from 66% to 50% by diluting it with sugar.

The amphetamines from Greenslopes was shipped to the Angel chapters in Sydney, Brisbane, and Adelaide for sale. Hill also shipped amphetamines to the Gypsy Joker biker gang in Perth, who were allies of the Hells Angels. At the time, the Hells Angels had no chapters in Western Australia, forcing Hill to use the Gypsy Jokers instead to sell his amphetamines. In the early 1980s, Hill's amphetamine lab was the only one in Australia as he and his team were the only underworld amphetamine cooks operating at the time. Hill told Sher and Marsden: "There wasn't anybody else in the market. Fucking hell! Customers were our last worry. We had more customers than we could supply. Of course we tried to stop anybody else doing it". By 1982, Hill was making between 4.5 and 5.5 kilograms of amphetamines in one 24-hour cycle. He made a profit between $70, 000 to $100, 000 on average for each 24-hour cycle. Hill recalled: "We sort of spent it as fast as we got on our lifestyle". Hill went on a manic shopping spree of buying up as much real estate, automobiles and motorcycles as he possibly could. He also became addicted to amphetamines, which affected his judgement.

In late 1981, Armstrong discovered the Greenslopes lab by accident. He set up on his personal computer an "alert" system under which every time the police ran a computer search on an automobile license plate belonging to a Hells Angel, it would set up an alert on Armstrong's computer. A resident of Wattle Glen reported to the police that there was a car that had parked in the same location for several days, which led the policeman who issued the ticket to run its license plate through the Victoria Police computer system. Aware that there was a car belonging to a Hells Angel in Wattle Glen, Armstrong drove out to investigate himself. When he saw Hill leave the Greensplopes property, he realized that something suspicious was occurring and entered Greenslopes after the Hells Angels went out to discover their lab. Hill had placed a voice-activated tape recorder to discover any unauthorised entries, but had defeated its purpose by neglecting to turn it on. Having obtained a warrant, Armstrong had Greenslopes bugged and listened in as Hill and the others cooked amphetamines.

On 10 March 1982, the Victoria police raided Greenslopes. Found inside were $18, 000 in cash, three kilograms of amphetamines, two handguns, and one machine gun. Hill and the others were all arrested. Within a day of his arrest, Hill made the $20, 000 bail imposed on him by a judge. Hill returned to Greenslopes where he dug up a kilogram of amphetamines he buried in the backyard. Hill used the sale of that amphetamines to build a new lab in Ballarat. Between 1980 and 1982, Hill had made a profit of $1.8 million at the Greenslopes lab and he hoped to make even greater profits at the new Ballarat lab. He spent his nights working at Ballarat to be followed up by going to court in Melbourne in the morning. Hill was often so exhausted that he fell asleep during his own trial.

== Armstrong murder plot ==
In the summer of 1982, Armstrong received a phone call from Audrey Hill who told him: "Look, I think you should be careful". When Armstrong asked her why, her response was: "You better be careful, I think Peter is going to try and kill you". Audrey Hill went on to say that her son had told her that he had hired a Hells Angels contract killer from America to come to Australia to kill Armstrong, whom Hill viewed as the principal source of his legal problems. Audrey Hill did not know the name of the killer, but only that his nickname was "the Assassin". Armstrong placed a call with the Australian federal police to ask if they knew of any American Hells Angels whose moniker was "the Assassin". Armstrong received the answer that the nickname applied to James Patton Brandes, the same member of the Oakland chapter who had such a close friendship with Hill. Upon contracting the California authorities, it was learned that Brandes had recently been acquitted of first-degree murder of a rival biker and of two counts of attempted murder with regard to two police officers of Brandes had been accused of attempting to kill. Most worrisome to Armstrong was the news that Brandes was planning to visit Australia soon and had already taken out a travel visa with his destination listed as Melbourne.

On 26 August 1982, Brandes landed at Melbourne airport. At the request of Armstrong, Brandes was detained by the Australian customs. Found inside of Brandes's briefcase was a photograph of Armstrong along with his home address. Also found in Brandes' briefcase were newspaper clippings about his trials, a pair of thumb screws, a detector for electric listening devices, and a copy of the U.S. Treasury's forensic handbooks with the passages about how to wipe fingerprints off metal being highlighted. Finally found on Brandes were the secret passwords given to FBI agents which allowed him to access the computer system of the U.S. Justice Department via the internet and learn about the ongoing status of any federal investigation. Armstrong bore a strong resemble to the English comedian Benny Hill and as soon as he arrived at the Melbourne airport to see Brandes, the latter immediately realised him. Brandes's first words upon seeing Armstrong were: "Shit, you look like Benny Hill". Armstrong in turn soon discovered that Brandes was a "hard nut" as he phrased it and would not turn Crown's evidence easily if at all. The Australian customs learned that Brandes had lied on his visa application as he failed to mention his convictions for drug dealing and gunrunning. Australia does not permit foreigners with criminal records to enter its borders, and Brandes was promptly put on the first flight back to San Francisco.

== Trial ==
With the failure of the murder plot, Hill turned to other strategies. He brought over as an expert witness Colin Fleet, described by Sher and Marsden as "an eccentric chemist from England". Fleet testified that Hill had been manufacturing polymers for plastics and fuel additives. Hill recruited Fleet to work in the Ballarat lab. Fleet used his chemistry skills to greatly improve upon the efficiency of amphetamine's manufacture. Fleet ended becoming addicted to amphetamines and committed suicide during a drug-induced delusion. Hill bribed one juror to acquit him. His trial ended in a hung jury with 11 members of the jury voting to convict him while the one corrupt juror kept voting to acquit him. With a hung jury, the judge was forced to declare a mistrial.

== Downfall ==
In 1983, another judge ruled against the Crown's motion for a new trial. Hill was now making more money than ever from the Ballarat lab. Armstrong decided to play a psychological game, launching raids on Hill and his associates while he and the other policemen would make seemingly casual off-hand remarks that suggested there was an informer in the ranks of the Angels. Armstrong would make a raid on the home of a Hell Angel and then say in apparent casual remark say to another policeman in front of the Hells Angel statements such as "That was good information that bloke gave us". The Crown had no informer in the ranks of the Melbourne chapter of the Hells Angels, but Armstrong's tactics convinced Hill that there was one. Hill became intensely paranoid and launched an obsessive search for the supposed informer. Hill expelled five members from his chapter on the suspicion that they might be informers, which led to a backlash against his leadership. The death of John Madden, the sergeant-at-arms of the Melbourne chapter, greatly weakened Hill's authority. In 1984, Madden was killed in what was described an automobile accident. Waterman described Madden's death as suspicious and added: "Madden had run out of money and he was starting to give indications that he might cut a deal. He was about to talk turkey".

Hill became increasingly unpopular within his own chapter with the feeling being he was too greedy in keeping the profits from the sale of amphetamines to himself while his obsessive paranoia about the supposed informer grated on many. Hill stated "it was jealousy that was the big problem". Hill discovered that Hamment had been stealing amphetamines to sell on his own that he was meant to share with his other three partners. Hill recalled: "Roger and myself weren't happy with his explanations Things were just getting a little bit greedy". Hamment in turn had preparing a coup d'état aimed at deposing Hill as the chapter president and making himself the new president of the Melbourne chapter. Hill had kept the Ballarat lab a secret from most of his own chapter, and its discovery by Armstrong in 1985 turned opinion in the Melbourne chapter firmly against Hill. The Ballarat lab was discovered by chance. Two detectives from the Melbourne happened to go on vacation and discovered when signing in to their motel the names of Hill and Biddlestone in the motel registry. In turn, the detectives informed Armstrong who had Hill and Biddlestone followed, which led him to the Ballarat lab.

Armstrong had Hill arrested again. Hamment used the discovery of the secret lab to launch his coup. Hill resigned not only as the chapter president but from the Hells Angels as well. Hill told Sher and Marsden in 2006: "I just had enough. Enough of everything. I was getting it from all sides. It was little bit too much". Hamment and a group of Hells Angels tore apart Hill's house as they claimed he had failed to return all of his Hells Angels paraphernalia to the chapter. A group of Hells Angels tried to kidnap Hill's wife, but he protected her by firing his shotgun in the air. Biddlestone who chose to stay on with the chapter was kidnapped by his fellow Hells Angels; held captive for 15 hours; had nearly every bone in his body broken during a lengthy torture session; and was dumped barely alive in front of a hospital.

Determined to avoid a similar fate, Hill turned himself in to his nemesis Armstrong. In a final blow against the Hells Angels, Hill sold the amphetamines recipe to the Black Uhlans biker gang, thereby breaking the monopoly held by the Hells Angels who until then were the only Australian bikie gang that knew the secret for making amphetamines Hill agreed to turn Crown's evidence and in a five-hour interview with Armstrong told all about his criminal activities. Hill testified against Hamment and the other members of his chapter. In 1987, in a plea bargain with the Crown, Hill pleaded guilty to various drug charges for which he was sentenced to five years in prison. Hill was released on parole in 1989 after serving two years of his sentence. After his release from prison, Hill worked as a truck driver and then as the owner of a restaurant in Mildura.

== Books ==
- Sher, Julian; Marsden, William (2006). Angels of Death: Inside the Bikers' Empire of Crime. Toronto: Alfred Knopf Canada. ISBN 9780307370327.
