= Centres for National Resilience =

The Centres for National Resilience are a group of quarantine centres in Australia, most of which were constructed in 2021 and 2022 in response to the COVID-19 pandemic in Australia.

In 2020, during the COVID-19 pandemic in Australia, an abandoned accommodation facility in Howard Springs, Northern Territory was converted to a quarantine facility, and began to be referred to as the "Centre for National Resilience". In 2021, the construction of three additional quarantine facilities modelled on the Howard Springs facility were announced — with the new facilities to be located in Melbourne, Brisbane, and Perth. The facilities' construction was funded by the Australian Government, but they were to be operated by the governments of the states where they are located. The facilities were designed by Billard Leece Partnership and AECOM, the design team responsible for the original Howard Springs facility. The construction of the three facilities cost around $1.35 billion.

The Melbourne facility was the first of the new facilities to open, in February 2022, and was used for quarantine during the COVID-19 pandemic until October 2022. The Brisbane and Perth facilities opened in late 2022, and were never used for quarantine during the COVID-19 pandemic. The facilities have occasionally been used as temporary accommodation during floods and fires. In 2024, the Brisbane facility was handed over to the Australian Federal Police to be converted to a police training facility, having never been used as a quarantine facility. The Perth facility was first used as a quarantine facility in May 2026, to isolate six passengers evacuated from the cruise ship MV Hondius after an outbreak of Andes virus on the ship.

== Facilities ==
=== Howard Springs ===
The Manigurr-ma Village is located in Howard Springs, Northern Territory. It was constructed by Japanese energy company Inpex opened an accommodation facility at Howard Springs for its temporary workers during the construction of the Ichthys LNG Project, designed to accommodate up to 3500 workers across 875 units. It opened in September 2013 and shut down in 2018.

In February 2020, during the COVID-19 pandemic, the Manigurr-ma Village was used to house Australians evacuated from Wuhan, China. Later in February, 164 Australians evacuated from the Diamond Princess cruise ship amid an outbreak of COVID-19 on the ship were also quarantined at the village.

The facility continued to be used throughout the COVID-19 pandemic, housing over 64,000 throughout its operation, and was referred to as the Centre for National Resilience. The quarantine facility was closed in June 2022, with the Northern Territory Government declaring that "dedicated isolation and quarantine facilities are no longer required".

=== Melbourne ===
The Melbourne Centre for National Resilience Melbourne is located in Mickleham, Victoria. Victorian Premier Daniel Andrews announced plans for the facility in February 2021. It began construction in July 2021 and opened in February 2022, and cost $580 million to build. It has a capacity of 1000 beds, but only 500 have ever been used. The facility was also planned to be used as temporary accommodation during bushfires, so that it would not sit vacant outside of health crises.

From its opening in February until October 2022, it was used to quarantine people during the COVID-19 pandemic. Only 500 of the facility's 1000 beds were used, and the number of operational beds was scaled down to 250 in July. In this period, it housed a total of 2168 people.

From October 2022 to March 2023, it was used as emergency accommodation during the 2022 south eastern Australia floods.

=== Brisbane ===
The Centre for National Resilience Brisbane was located in Pinkenba, Queensland on land owned by the Department of Defence at the site of the Damascus Barracks. It began construction in October 2021 and opened on 25 August 2022. It had a capacity of 500 beds, with plans to expand to 1000 beds.

The Brisbane facility was never used for quarantine. It was briefly used by the Department of Defence. In April 2024, the facility was handed over to the Australian Federal Police, who will convert it into a police training facility.

=== Perth ===
The Bullsbrook Centre for National Resilience is located in Bullsbrook, Western Australia. It began construction in October 2021 and was completed in October 2022, with construction costing $400 million. It has a capacity of 500 beds. For its first year of operation, it was run by the Government of Western Australia at a cost of $13 million; it was subsequently handed over to the federal Department of Finance.

The units at the facility each include a bathroom, air conditioning, television, internet access, and a kitchenette.

In 2023, the facility was briefly used to house 70 displaced Mariginiup residents after the 2023 Wanneroo bushfire.

In April 2026, Western Australia's Minister for Corrective Services Paul Papalia confirmed that the facility had been proposed to be converted into a prison.

On May 15, 2026, the facility admitted six passengers evacuated from the cruise ship MV Hondius after it experienced an outbreak of Andes virus — four Australian citizens, one Australian permanent resident, and one New Zealand citizen. The passengers landed at the nearby RAAF Base Pearce, from where they were transported to the quarantine centre. The pilots who flew the passengers back to Australia also spent one night isolating in the facility, before leaving the country the next day. The passengers quarantined in the facility until 23 June — 42 days after they disembarked the MV Hondius in the Canary Islands.
