= Palmerston Regional Hospital =

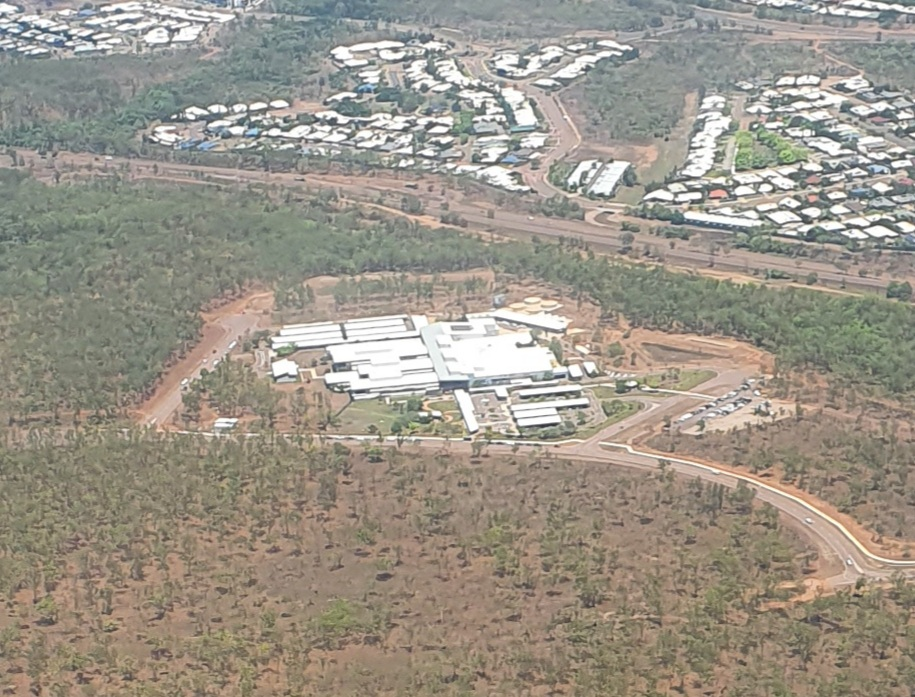
- Aerial view of Palmerston Regional Hospital, September 2022

Geography
- Location: Holtze, Northern Territory, Australia
- Coordinates: 12.47583333°S 131.00416667°E

Organisation
- Care system: Public Medicare (AU)

Services
- Emergency department: Yes
- Beds: 116

Helipads
- Helipad: No

History
- Founded: 2018

Links
- Lists: Hospitals in Australia

Palmerston Regional Hospital (PRH) is a public hospital in the outer suburbs of Darwin in the Northern Territory, Australia. It is located in Holtze, just north of the satellite city of Palmerston. It opened in 2018 as a campus of Royal Darwin Hospital (RDH), providing general medical inpatient care, rehabilitation services, elective and day surgeries to residents of Palmerston and the rural Litchfield Municipality. Staff are shared between both hospitals, as part of the Top End Health Service network.

== History ==
In 1998, Territory Health Services considered the growing need for medical services in Palmerston and the Darwin rural area over the next ten years. A need for access to 24-hour acute care services was identified, as well as for dedicated women's health facilities, including a possible birthing centre. However, at this time it was considered that the costs to establish and maintain a hospital to meet this scope would be prohibitive and impact the overall efficiency of the local health system.

The strong demand for health services in the area resulted in Palmerston being announced as the site of one of 31 "GP Super Clinics" announced by the Federal government in 2007. Although this clinic addressed some shortfalls, it still did not provide a true 24 hour casualty service and, as a privately operated facility, would not offer bulk billing through Medicare to all patients. The Northern Territory Government began planning to build a new public hospital in 2009, initially expected to be completed by 2015, which would address these gaps and a need for more specialised treatment and diagnostic services.

Budget papers in 2011 allocated $110 million for the construction of Palmerston Regional Hospital, split between the Territory and Federal governments. Following the Territory election in 2012, incoming Health Minister Dave Tollner questioned if the Territory could actually afford to honour the previous government's commitment of $40 million towards the project, despite his own Country Liberal Party promising to deliver the hospital during the election campaign. Internal tensions within the Territory Government over the costs of sustaining two hospitals in Darwin contributed to the project falling behind schedule. In 2015, the hospital made national headlines when the Federal Opposition accused Major Projects Minister Paul Fletcher of helping to fund a publicity stunt after a press conference at the hospital site in October. Territory Health Minister John Elferink called the media event to announce that construction of the delayed project had commenced while concrete was poured into a hole said to be foundations for a stairway. The hole was filled in with dirt just days later.

The hospital's emergency department, radiology department and pharmacy opened on 27 August 2018. The total final cost exceeded $206 million. It quickly became apparent that the budget set aside to operate the hospital was inadequate, while sharing staff between PRH and Royal Darwin Hospital put both emergency departments under pressure and had actually increased overall waiting times. In 2020, the President of the Territory branch of the Australian Medical Association described the hospital as a "total waste of money", suggesting all but the rehabilitation and geriatric wards should be closed. This statement was refuted by the Top End Health Service, claiming that the number of presentations to the emergency department was proof there was a need for the facility, which intended to open 30 new beds that year.

The establishment of a national quarantine facility in nearby Howard Springs during the global COVID-19 pandemic placed further pressure on the ability to adequately staff the hospital. In September 2021, it was revealed that health officials had considered closing the PRH emergency department as a result of the ongoing staff shortages.

== Services ==
The Palmerston Regional Hospital operates as a campus of the Royal Darwin Hospital. Patients presenting at the emergency department are assessed, with critically ill patients, or those suffering life-threatening conditions transferred to RDH via a road transport service provided by CareFlight.

Other services available at the hospital include general surgery, medical imaging and diagnostics, pharmacy, specialist outpatient clinics and allied health supports. There is no maternity ward, and the hospital is not equipped to support labour and childbirth, however it does provide education, prenatal and follow up care for mothers and babies.

Two of the Top End Health Service's specialist units are based at PRH:

- Geriatric Evaluation and Management program - a dedicated 24-bed ward as well as outpatient support services focussed on providing quality of life for older patients.
- Rehabilitation Program - assists recovery from injuries including major burns, neurological injury and stroke, trauma, acquired brain injuries and major surgery for patients aged over 14, offering inpatient beds and outpatient clinics.

== Statistics ==
In the 2019–20 reporting period, Palmerston Regional Hospital handled 30,077 emergency department presentations, of which 77% were treated within clinically recommended timeframes, performing below the national average for comparable hospitals in all triage categories except patients requiring immediate resuscitation. PRH performed well below average for patients requiring semi-urgent and urgent care, with only 61% and 55% respectively treated within recommended timeframes. The hospital conducted 1,239 elective surgeries, with considerably longer waiting times than comparable hospitals. During the period, the hospital reported 11,470 admissions, per data available on the Australian Institute of Health and Welfare's MyHospitals website.

The Australasian College for Emergency Medicine have been critical of the hospital's performance responding to medical emergencies, calling for the urgent addition of more beds. The college has described the situation as unsustainable, citing data from PRH's first 18 months of operation that shows the hospital has made little difference to emergency department waiting times in the Darwin area, nor has it adequately relieved overcrowding and access to emergency treatment at Royal Darwin Hospital.

== See also ==
- Royal Darwin Hospital
