= Weddell, Northern Territory =

Weddell
- Suburb
- Interactive map of Weddell
- Coordinates: 12°37′02″S 131°00′24″E
- Country: Australia
- State: Northern Territory
- LGA: Litchfield Municipality
- Location: 24 km (15 mi) SE of Darwin City
- Established: 4 April 2007

Government
  - Territory electorate: Daly
  - Federal division: Lingiari

Population
  - Total: 69 (2016 census)
- Time zone: UTC+9:30 (ACST)
- Postcode: 0822
- Mean max temp: 32.1 °C (89.8 °F)
- Mean min temp: 23.2 °C (73.8 °F)
- Annual rainfall: 1,725.1 mm (67.92 in)
Suburbs around Weddell
Archer	Archer; Mitchell; Virginia	Virginia
Wickham; Blackmore	Weddell	Virginia; Creek Bees; Noonamah
Blackmore	Berry Springs	Livingstone
- Locations; Adjoining localities

Weddell is a locality in the Northern Territory of Australia located about 24 kilometres (15 mi) south-east of the territory capital of Darwin City.

Weddell is located on land and some adjoining waters which are bounded in part by the Blackmore River in the west, the Elizabeth River in the east and the Cox Peninsula Road in the south. The locality was named after the satellite town proposed during the late 1980s to be located to the south of the Darwin urban area and which was named after Robert Weddell who served as the Government Resident of North Australia from 1927 to 1931 and as the Administrator of the Northern Territory from 1931 to 1937. In 2010, the Northern Territory Government convened a forum to consider options for a future city located within the current locality's boundaries. Its boundaries and name were gazetted on 4 April 2007.

The 2016 Australian census which was conducted in August 2016 reports that Weddell had 69 people living within its boundaries.

Weddell is located within the federal division of Lingiari, the territory electoral division of Daly and within the local government area of the Litchfield Municipality.
