= Royal Darwin Hospital =

Hospital in Tiwi, Northern Territory, Australia

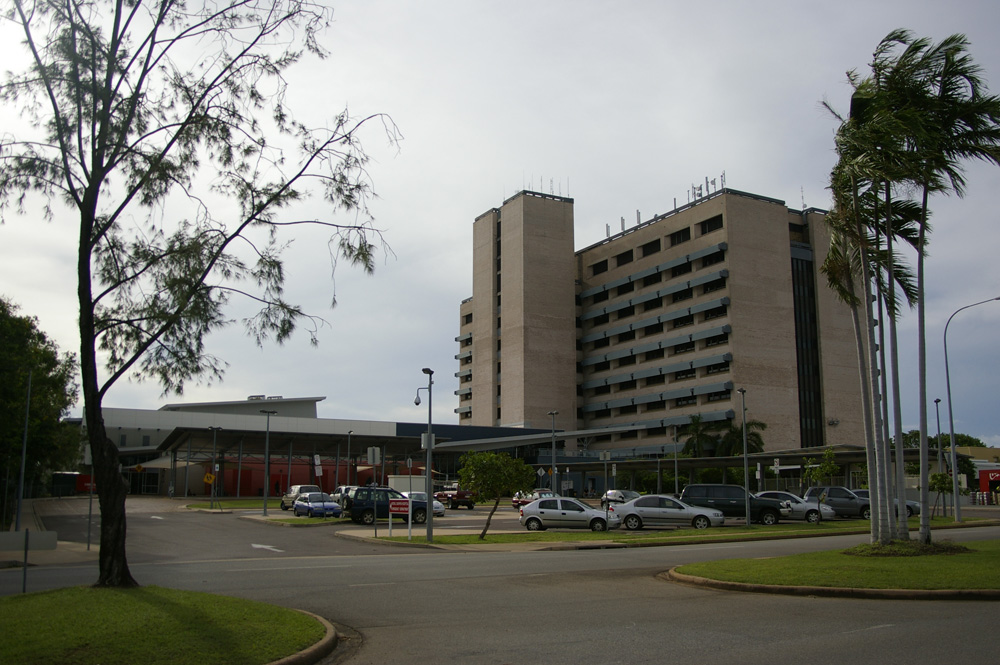
- Royal Darwin Hospital

Geography
- Location: Tiwi, Northern Territory, Australia
- Coordinates: 12°21′21″S 130°52′55″E

Organisation
- Care system: Public Medicare (AU)
- Type: Teaching
- Affiliated university: Flinders University, Charles Darwin University & University of Sydney

Services
- Emergency department: Yes
- Beds: 360

Helipads
- Helipad: (ICAO: YXDH)
Number	Length		Surface
Number	ft	m	Surface
1			concrete

History
- Founded: 1980 as Casuarina Hospital

Links
- Website: Official Website
- Lists: Hospitals in Australia

The Royal Darwin Hospital (RDH) is a 360-bed Australian teaching hospital located in Tiwi, a northern suburb of Darwin, Northern Territory. It is part of the Top End Health Service, which covers an area of 475,338 km^{2} (183,529 sq mi). RDH is the only tertiary referral hospital in the Northern Territory, however, Alice Springs Hospital, while not a full tertiary hospital, provides some tertiary-level services in certain specialties. RDH also providing complex, high-level clinical services for patients in parts of Western Australia and Southeast Asia. Following the 2002 Bali bombings, the National Critical Care and Trauma Response Centre was established by the Australian Government, bolstering Royal Darwin Hospital's capacity to respond to trauma and support deployed medical assistance teams during crises and medical emergencies in the Asia-Pacific.

It is the main teaching hospital for Charles Darwin University's School of Medicine and is also home to a campus of Flinders University. The Menzies School of Health Research, established in partnership with the University of Sydney, is headquartered at the hospital. This school maintains research facilities and provides opportunities for post-graduate studies specialising in Aboriginal health and tropical medicine at Royal Darwin Hospital. The Palmerston Regional Hospital operates as a campus of RDH for treatment of sub-acute conditions and rehabilitation, with staff shared between the two hospitals.

== History ==
The first hospital of the settlement of Palmerston (later Darwin) was built in 1874. The hospital was built on Packard Street overlooking Doctors Gully under the authority of Dr James Millner. By 1878, the hospital was improved with stone. During the next 40 years, the hospital was administered by South Australia. In 1911, the Commonwealth Government assumed control. Construction of an 89-bed hospital fronting Mitchell Street West, at Myilly Point in Larrakeyah commenced in 1941 to cater for the Darwin area population of 4,000. The new hospital opened 2 February 1942 and was bombed by the Japanese just 17 days later. By 1970, the facilities were struggling to cope with the demands of the growing population and a site was selected for a second hospital on Rocklands Drive in the planned new suburb of Tiwi.

Construction on the site, then known as Casuarina Hospital began in 1973. In the interest of reducing time and costs, a design by architects Stephenson and Son of Melbourne was chosen, based on the new Woden Valley Hospital in Canberra with modifications to suit the tropical climate. Initial planning expected the hospital to be operational by January 1977, with capacity for up to 425 beds, followed by a potential second stage adding 220 beds and a rehabilitation centre in 1980. The Commonwealth Department of Works initially costed the main hospital building at $16 million, however Cyclone Tracy in 1974 flooded the site, leading to delays and cost blow-outs.

By April 1978, the first buildings were complete, with the hospital laundry opening in April and occupation of staff residences began following shortly after. Casuarina Hospital became fully operational on 20 May 1980, with the official opening by Prime Minister Malcolm Fraser occurring on 19 September. On 1 January 1982, the Casuarina Hospital name was changed to Darwin Hospital. Following the Royal Assent on 10 January 1984, the hospital became Royal Darwin Hospital.

During 2003, The Royal Darwin Hospital underwent a $43 million major redevelopment that included construction of a new Emergency Department and an expanded Intensive Care Unit. A coronary care unit, an additional Operating Theatre suite, a new Imaging Department and a 12-bed Hospice were also added.

The Royal Darwin Hospital is also home of the National Critical Care and Trauma Response Centre funded by the Australian Government after the hospital's efforts associated with the 2002 Bali bombings.

=== Recent developments ===
In November 2025, Severe Tropical Cyclone Fina caused damage to parts of Royal Darwin Hospital, including sections of an exterior brick facade. Engineers conducted structural inspections following the incident, including assessments to the rwhole building. The incident prompted renewed public discussion regarding the condition of the aging structure and long-term future of the facility, which has been in operation for nearly 50 years.

== Services ==
Royal Darwin Hospital is the largest hospital in the Northern Territory, and employs over 1500 people. Some of the services at the hospital are Anaesthetics, Cardiology, Emergency, Palliative care, Intensive Care and Surgery, Medicine, Pathology and Radiology and many other services.

Royal Darwin also fosters relationships with Darwin's other hospitals, including the Darwin Private Hospital.

In 2026, workforce expansion initiatives across the Northern Territory included the recruitment of more than 200 additional doctors supporting hospitals in the NT public health system.

== Statistics ==
In the 2019–20 reporting period, Royal Darwin Hospital handled 56,732 Emergency Department presentations, of which 74% were treated within clinically recommended timeframes, performing below the national average for comparable hospitals in all triage categories except patients requiring immediate resuscitation. The hospital conducted 3,977 elective surgeries, with broadly similar waiting times to comparable hospitals. During the period, the hospital reported 82,254 admissions in the same period, per data available on the Australian Institute of Health and Welfare's MyHospitals website.

== Racial profiling controversy ==
In 2016, the hospital made international news, attracting criticism when Indigenous musician Geoffrey Gurrumul Yunupingu attended the Emergency Department while vomiting blood. The artist had been advised to remain in Darwin near the hospital rather than returning to his home at Galiwin'ku due to a flare up in symptoms related to a Hepatitis B infection by his kidney specialist. When his symptoms returned, Gurrumul's manager and nurse called an ambulance and accompanied him to the hospital, explaining the situation. Gurrumul, who was also blind, was left to wait for eight hours with internal bleeding before receiving treatment, ending up in the intensive care unit. The incident saw allegations of institutional racism and profiling levelled against the hospital's staff by both Gurrumul's manager, and specialist Dr Paul Lawton when it emerged that notes on his medical chart may have indicated that the condition was related to alcohol abuse. Dr Lawton alleged that nationally published data suggested that racial profiling was commonplace at the hospital.

Although a complaint was lodged, both the hospital and the Territory's Health Minister John Elferink refuted the allegations. Elferink asserted that questions about consumption of alcohol are a normal and necessary part of the diagnostic process for any patient presenting for medical treatment, in line with the hospital's policies. He declined to formally investigate the claims, labelling them a publicity stunt. The Northern Territory branch of the Australian Medical Association also defended the hospital's record on working with Indigenous Australians, pointing out that 60 per cent of patients treated at RDH are Indigenous. Although Gurrumul recovered on that occasion, he died at Royal Darwin Hospital from his disease in July 2017.

== Workplace safety ==
In April 2026, reports indicated that staff at Royal Darwin Hospital were experiencing frequent threats and incidents of violence, particularly in the emergency department. Nursing union representatives stated that nurses were being subjected to daily threats and occasional assaults while on duty. Nurses also described the working conditions as "scary", e.g staff are using YouTube and ChatGPT to teach themselves procedures.

== See also ==
- List of hospitals in Australia
