= Howard Springs, Northern Territory =

Howard Springs
- Suburb
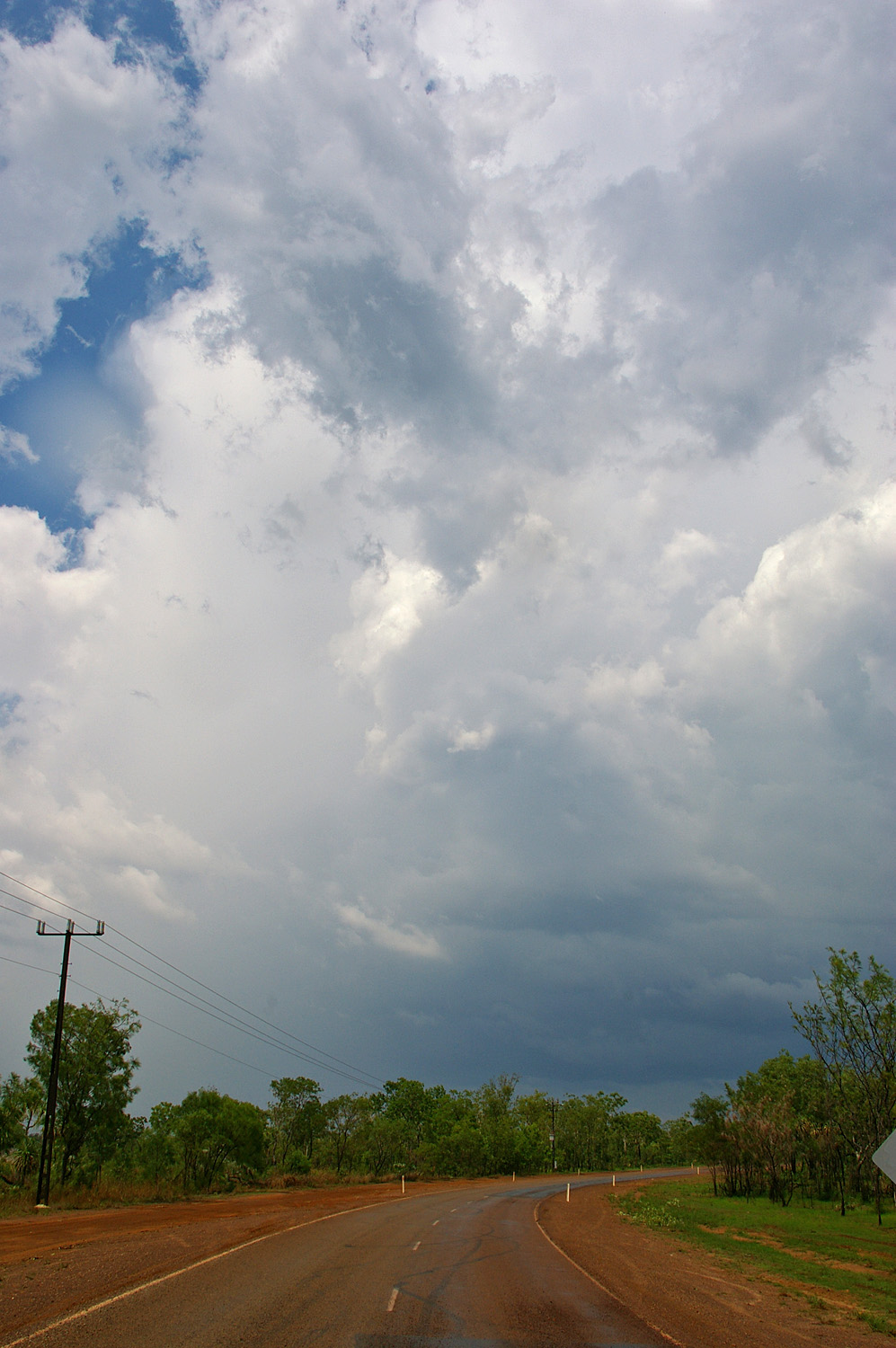

- Interactive map of Howard Springs
- Coordinates: 12°28′02″S 131°03′44″E
- Country: Australia
- State: Northern Territory
- City: Darwin
- LGA: Litchfield Municipality
- Established: 1864

Government
  - Territory electorate: Nelson
  - Federal division: Lingiari

Area
  - Total: 78.58 km^{2} (30.34 sq mi)

Population
  - Total: 5,132 (2016 census)
  - Density: 65.309/km^{2} (169.150/sq mi)
- Postcode: 0835
Suburbs around Howard Springs
Shoal Bay	Shoal Bay	Shoal Bay
Shoal Bay; Holtze; Johnston; Zuccoli; Virginia	Howard Springs	Shoal Bay; Koolpinyah
Virginia	Virginia; Coolalinga; McMinns Lagoon; Girraween; Koolpinyah	Koolpinyah

Howard Springs is a locality in the Northern Territory. It is located 29 kilometres (18 mi) SE of the Darwin CBD in the local government area of Litchfield Municipality. The suburb is mostly a rural area, but has been experiencing strong growth in population and development.

== Early history ==
European settlement of the area began in 1864. The stream which commenced with a spring was named for Frederick Howard in 1865 by the survey party of B. T. Finniss. Howard was the captain of a schooner and a hydrographer.

Although first examined in 1921, Howard Springs in 1939 became the first major water supply area to service Darwin, at one time also known as Worgan Springs. Discharge was calculated to be 1.9 million imperial gallons (8.6 Ml) every twenty-four hours. Later Manton Dam supplied water to Darwin with the onset of World War 2, but now most of Darwin's water supply comes from Darwin River Dam.

Uranium was located in the area in November 1952, but not in a workable form.

The suburb is mostly a rural area, but has been experiencing strong growth in population and development. A primary school was established in 1974.

An accommodation facility named Manigurr-ma Village was built at Howard Springs in 2012 by Japanese energy company Inpex to accommodate up to 3500 temporary fly-in fly-out construction workers on the Ichthys LNG gas plant. The facility was closed and abandoned in 2018.

== COVID-19 quarantine facility ==
From early 2020, the abandoned accommodation site became a quarantine facility for people returning to Australia from areas infected with COVID-19, initially on 9 February 2020 from Wuhan. The quarantine facility was run by the Australian Medical Assistance Team (AUSMAT). From later in 2020, the facility was a quarantine facility for people arriving from Victoria during the second lockdown in that state.

From mid-October 2020 the quarantine facility was referred to as the Centre for National Resilience, in anticipation of an agreement between the Northern Territory and Federal Governments in October 2020 for use of the camp for that purpose. From late October 2020, the quarantine facility was used for repatriating Australians from Europe and India. From May 2021, the Northern Territory Government began to gradually take over all operations from AUSMAT.

Following the recommendations of a national review of hotel quarantine for a national quarantine centre, the commissioning of Howard Springs prompted demands for other quarantine facilities, which based on the Howard Springs model were approved to proceed for construction at Mickleham, Victoria in June, 2021; at Jandakot, Western Australia in August 2021, at Pinkinba, Brisbane, Queensland in mid-August 2021 and a separate state government built Queensland facility at Toowoomba in late August. Howard Springs and the first three of these run under Federal Government auspices (though operated by the relevant state or territory government) are all modelled on the Howard Springs camp and use the Centre for National Resilience name, on the basis of the Howard Springs camp's success in avoiding COVID-19 leaks.

== Demographics ==
In the 2021 census, Howard Springs had a population of 3,153 with 43.7% describing their ancestry as Australian. This is followed by 38.9% describing their ancestry as English, 9.8% Irish, 9.3% Scottish and 7.3% Australian Aboriginal. 77.9% of Howard Springs residents were born in Australia, followed by 3.6% in England, 1.9% in New Zealand, 0.8% in the Philippines, 0.7% in India and 0.5% in Ireland. 87.4% spoke only English at home followed by the next most common languages: 0.7% Greek, 0.4% Indonesian and 0.4% Thai.
