= Bob Armstrong (policeman) =

Australian police officer (1948-2012)

- Born: 1948; Gippsland, Victoria, Australia
- Died: 19 December 2012 (aged 64); Victoria, Australia
- Police career
- Department: Victoria Police; National Crime Authority; Australian Crime Commission
- Service years: 1967–2008
- Rank: Inspector

Robert Armstrong (1948 – 19 December 2012) was an Australian policeman regarded as the "pre-eminent bikie gang expert" with the Victoria Police.

== Police career ==
Armstrong was born on a dairy farm in the Gippsland region close to the Victoria–New South Wales border. After finishing high school, Armstrong worked as a lumberjack and as a farm laborer. Armstrong told the Canadian journalists Julian Sher and William Marsden about why he joined the Victoria Police: "Then in 1967 I was putting down a couple of beers with a mate and said, 'Let's join the cops'. People always ask you 'why did you join the cops?' No real reason". After working as a constable, Armstrong was promoted up to detective in 1975. Sher and Marsden wrote: "There's nothing particularly imposing about Bob Armstrong. He's of medium height and reasonably muscular, but nothing over the top. He has a round, ruddy face and a slightly mischievous, boyish smile. People claim he looks like the comedian Benny Hill. There's a bit of Benny in him, no doubt, but not much. His eyes are too direct and too tough".

=== Against the Hells Angels ===
In the early 1970s, Armstrong took part in a raid on the home of Roger "Rebel" Pexa, the treasurer of the Hells Angels Melbourne chapter and was impressed with Pexa's gun collection as he had a huge number of illegal handguns that were all .38, .45 and .357 pistols, each with its own name. Armstrong recalled thinking: "They're into drugs, they're into guns – who are this mob?"

Armstrong made a point of raiding the homes of the Hells Angels Melbourne chapter, where he discovered guns, stolen jewelry, forged drivers' licenses, marijuana, some crude amphetamine labs, and a pamphlet from the United States entitled Speed Made Easy: How to manufacture amphetamines. In 1975, Armstrong gave a television conference where he accused the Melbourne Hells Angels chapter of being engaged in gun-running and selling amphetamine. Peter John Hill, the chapter president, sued Armstrong for defamation on behalf of his entire chapter as he claimed that Armstrong's press conference had damaged the good reputation of all the chapter members. Hill's lawsuit was dismissed by a judge who ruled that the Melbourne chapter was so infamous that its members had no good reputation for Armstrong to damage. Armstrong recalled that Hill's slander suit was the beginning of a feud as he stated: "That got up my nose. That's where it started". Armstrong was relentless in pursuing the Hells Angels despite frequently receiving death threats. Armstrong said of the threats: "There had been numerous threats. They ranged from 'We're going to land a plane on your station; we're going to drop a bomb' to 'we're gonna kill Bob Armstrong and his team of bloody detectives'...If you let them get to you it'll drive you mad. So you just got to learn to deal with it. You carry a gun and you learn to handle it". From 1977 onward, Armstrong was dedicated entirely to pursuing the Hells Angels' Melbourne chapter and its president, Hill. Cases involving the Hells Angels are very difficult to solve, and many of Armstrong's friends advised him to stop investigating the Hells Angels as the amount of work and stress involved in Hells Angels-related cases were having an adverse effect on him. Armstrong admitted that the obnoxious behavior of the Hells Angels with their constant death threats against him and his family, their arrogant sense of entitlement and the general unpleasantness of the Angels did impose much strain on him.

Armstrong served with the Bureau of Criminal Intelligence. Armstrong had set up an alert system on his personal computer under which his computer would be alerted every time a police officer ran a search on the license plate of a Hells Angel. In December 1981, an elderly woman, Mrs. Brown, reported a number of suspicious vehicles at the Greenslopes farm outside of Wattle Glen. A police constable ran a computer search on the license plate of the automobile which belonged to a Hells Angel, which alerted Armstrong. Curious as why a Hells Angel would be out in a remote rural area, Armstrong drove out to Greenslopes and discovered the largest amphetamine lab in Australia up to that point. He had Greenslopes bugged and listened in as Hill along with the Hells Angels Roger Biddlestone, Ray Hamment and John Madden went about manufacturing amphetamine. Armstrong headed a special unit known as Omega whose sole purpose to take down the Melbourne chapter of the Hells Angels.

At 6 pm on 10 March 1982, Armstrong and a group of Victoria state police constables raided Greenslopes where they discovered a machine gun, two illegal handguns from the United States, $18,000 in cash and three kilograms of amphetamine. Hill, Biddlestone, Hamment and Madden were all arrested and charged with various narcotics and gun offenses. Hill and the other Hells Angels soon made the $20,000 bail and in a violation of their bail conditions promptly went back to manufacturing amphetamines. Hill had buried one kilogram of amphetamine in the backyard of Greenslopes and used the profits from selling that kilogram to open a new amphetamine lab outside of Ballarat. The Hells Angels especially hated Armstrong, whom they called "Noddy" or "Benny Hill", because Armstrong bore a resemblance to the English comedian Benny Hill. Detective Sergeant Steele Waterman of the Victoria police who served with Armstrong on the Omega squad recalled: "Bob was pretty sharp. Bob used to pepper them all the time. He chased them and when a guy drove into the headquarters he followed them. He didn't take a backward step. He would have their bikes pulled over and declared unroadworthy to get them off the road."

Convinced that his nemesis Armstrong was his principal problem, Hill decided to hire an American Hells Angel to kill Armstrong. Audrey Hill, the mother of Hill, phoned Armstrong in the summer of 1982 to warn him that her son had hired an American Hells Angel, whose name she did not know, but whose moniker was "the Assassin", to kill him. Armstrong contacted the Australian Federal Police for information about any American Hells Angel called "the Assassin", and learned that James Patton "Jim-Jim" Brandes of the Oakland chapter was known by that moniker. Armstrong also learned that Brandes had been accused of the attempted murders of two police officers along with the murder of a rival biker. Brandes was accused of planting the bomb in the automobile that had nearly killed sergeant John Kracht of the San Jose Police Department and of planting the bomb in the automobile of William Zerby of the California Bureau of Narcotic Enforcement. Zerby had survived the bombing of his car, but was so severely injured by the car bomb that he had to retire. Both Kracht and Zerby were officers whom Brandes had "locked horns with" as the Hells Angels president Sonny Barger phrased it in his autobiography. Finally, Armstrong learned that Brandes had just taken out a travel visa for Australia with his destination listed as Melbourne.

On 26 August 1982, Brandes landed at Melbourne Airport. At Armstrong's request, Brandes was detained by the customs officials. The customs officials found in Brandes's luggage a photograph of Armstrong along with his home address; newspaper articles about Hill's trials; a pair of thumb screws; a detector for finding electronic listening devices; and the U.S. Treasury's forensic handbook with the passages about how to wipe off fingerprints off metal being highlighted. Brandes had in his briefcase the secret internet passwords for the computer files of the U.S. federal Department of Justice, allowing the Hells Angels to access via the internet the most secret files on the current investigations into the Hells Angels. Armstrong later stated about the internet passwords found on Brandes for the U.S. Department of Justice: "That scared the hell out of them". Most worrisome from Armstrong's point of view was that Brandes had instructions about how to make car bombs. Armstrong drove out to confront Brandes and upon entering the room despite having not met him before Brandes immediately recognised him. Armstrong told Sher and Marsden that Brandes was a "hard nut" whom it would be extremely difficult if not impossible to turn Crown's evidence. It was soon discovered that Brandes had lied on his visa as he failed to mention his prior convictions for gun-running and drug dealing, which led him to be deported back to the United States (foreigners with criminal records are not allowed to enter Australia). Armstrong stated: "I used to go and see Audrey every once in a while and thank her very much".

Hill bribed one of the jurors to vote for an acquittal. The trial ended in a hung jury with 11 of the jurors voting to convict the accused while the one bribed juror voted for an acquittal. The judge was forced to declare a mistrial, which led to freedom for Hill and the other Hells Angels. Armstrong decided to "crack" Hill by waging a psychological campaign designed to trick him into believing one of his chapter was an informer. Armstrong launched a series of raids on homes and businesses of the Melbourne chapter where drugs and guns were seized. Within the earshot of the arrested Hells Angel, Armstrong and his colleagues would make seemingly casual remarks such as: "That was good information that bloke gave us". The Victoria police had no informers in the Melbourne chapter, but Armstrong's misinformation tactics convinced Hill that there was one. Intensely paranoid about the supposed informer, Hill expelled and beat up five members of his chapter out of their belief that they might be the informer while forcing the others to take questionnaires and lie detector tests intended to expose the supposed informer. Hill's paranoia about the alleged informer turned his chapter against him. In 1985, Armstrong discovered the secret Hells Angel lab in Ballarat, which Hill had kept a secret from most of his own chapter as well. The revelation of the secret lab finally discredited Hill's leadership of the chapter.

Hill was deposed as chapter president by Hamment. Hamment had Hill expelled from the Hells Angels while Biddlestone, who attempted to stay on, was kidnapped by the Angels, tortured for fifteen hours, had nearly every bone in his body broken, and was finally dumped in front of a hospital barely alive. Both Hill and Biddlestone decided to turn Crown's evidence. Hill turned himself in to Armstrong and during a taped five-hour conversation told Armstrong everything he knew about the Hells Angels. Hill made a plea bargain with the Crown where in exchange for testifying against his former chapter he would serve five years in prison with eligibility for parole within two years. In 1987, Hill pleaded guilty to conspiracy to manufacture and sell amphetamine and in the ensuring trials his testimony sent most of his former chapter to prison.

=== Against the Bandidos ===
By 1985, Armstrong was feeling that the stress of handling biker-related cases was becoming too much and wanted to move on. Shortly before he turned Crown's evidence, Hill had sold the recipe for making amphetamines to John Higgs, the president of the Black Uhlans biker gang of Brisbane. At the time of Higg's arrest in 1994, the police found at his house amphetamines valued at $400 million Australian dollars. After Higgs was arrested, other biker gangs learned the secret for making amphetamine. Armstrong oversaw Operation Barkly, an investigation into the Bandidos. On 31 May 1996, he inserted two undercover officers into the Ballarat chapter of the Bandidos. Over the course of the next eighteen months, the two officers rose up to become "full patch" Bandidos while the two female officers playing their girlfriends were widely accepted into Bandido circles.

One of the undercover officers was on the brink of being promoted to the office of secretary of the Bandido Ballarat chapter, but Armstrong ordered a series of arrests before the promotion occurred. Operation Barkly culminated on 11 December 1997, when approximately 100 police officers carried out a series of coordinated raids against the Bandidos in four states. 19 people were arrested, and around $1 million of drugs and $6 million of precursor chemicals in the manufacture of drugs were seized along with numerous weapons, including an AK-47 assault rifle.

About the controversial decision to shut down the operation before the promotion occurred, Armstrong argued that three leaders of the Bandido Ballarat chapter had been murdered over the last two years, and it would be dangerous to have an undercover officer as the chapter secretary. Finally, Armstrong argued that all four of the undercover officers were showing signs of psychological stress and he thought it best to end the operation before any of his agents made a mistake that might cost them their lives. However, Armstrong told Sher and Marsden: "I've often thought about what would have happened if we just kept it going. One of them could have gone on to be national secretary, communicating with all the other chapters across the world, keeping the network going".

=== Anti-bikie expert ===
By the 1990s, Armstrong was considered to be the main anti-biker expert with the Victoria police. In 1993, Armstrong founded the Victoria's police first undercover unit, which he remained in charge of until 2001. His notable triumph was a successful operation against the Bandidos that saw twenty of their members convicted of various drug and gun offenses.

From 2001 to 2006, Armstrong worked with the National Crime Authority and then the Australian Crime Commission. In 2001, he retired from the Victoria police as an Inspector after 34 years on the force, to take up a position with the National Crime Authority. Armstrong told the Australian journalist John Silverster: "One of the frustrations in Victoria was the lack of resources, but with the NCA we had a large budget and we were able to take on some really big investigations." It was felt that Armstrong was a better policeman in the field than in a bureaucratic position. Many of the younger policemen felt that Armstrong's methods were too old-fashioned for the modern world. Armstrong stated when the Australian Crime Commission replaced the National Crime Authority in 2003, he was marginalised. Armstrong told Silvester: "The secret squirrels all thought they knew better than me. They were the sort who thought undercover work was about hiding behind trees with sunglasses on."

In 2004, Armstrong recruited a detective with the Queensland Police Service to join the Australian Crime Commission. Armstrong had promised the detective that the crime commission would pay his moving expenses, a promise that was voided by Armstrong's superiors, which caused much ill will. The crime commission tried to fire the detective for an accepting the gift of a dog from an informer, which Armstrong saw as an absurd decision. The detective was fired after he told a colleague about the sort of questions that he might be asked at a crime commission job interview, which Armstrong felt was a petty and wrong-headed move. In 2008, he resigned from the crime commission in protest. Armstrong told Silvester in 2008: " "I am not bitter. I have had a fantastic career and it was time to move on. I just hope that the fellow they shafted has the chance to resume his." In 2009, he accused the Victoria police of complacency as he stated: "They've just got their heads in the sand if they think bikies aren't a problem here".

== Death ==
Armstrong died on 19 December 2012 of cancer, at the age of 64. He was survived by his wife and two children. Ken Lay, Chief Commissioner of the Victoria Police, paid tribute to Armstrong, describing him as "a man who could be relied upon to do the hard jobs", and saying: "He was respected by senior and junior coppers alike".

== Books ==
- Sher, Julian; Marsden, William (2006). Angels of Death: Inside the Bikers' Empire of Crime. Toronto: Alfred Knopf Canada. ISBN 9780307370327.
