= Farebox recovery ratio =

Fares collected versus operating expenses in public transport

The farebox recovery ratio (also called fare recovery ratio, fare recovery rate or other terms) of a passenger transportation system is the fraction of operating expenses which are met by the fares paid by passengers. It is computed by dividing the system's total fare revenue by its total operating expenses.

== Fare structures ==
There are generally two types of fare structures: a simple, flat rate fare structure (pay a fixed fare regardless of time of day and/or travel distance) or a complex, variable rate fare structure (pay a variable fare depending on time of day and/or travel distance). A variable fare structure is typically associated with a higher recovery ratio, though it may simply be the case that such systems are implemented only on more profitable networks or modes such as commuter rail. Variable-rate fares require a higher initial investment in fare ticketing technologies such as the use of contactless smart cards, turnstiles or fare gates, automated ticket machines, as well as IT infrastructure.

== Farebox ratios around the world ==
The farebox recovery ratio is the ratio of fare revenue to total transport expenses for a given system. These two figures can be found in the financial statements of the operators. Oftentimes the operator runs multiple modes of transport (e.g. subway and bus), and there is no data for individual modes (segment analysis). In this case the operator is considered as one system, or a group of modes are collectively considered one system.

Fare revenue is not the same as "transport" or "operational" revenue, as there are often secondary sources of revenue such as lockers and paid restrooms and advertisement revenue. Fare revenue is a subset of transport revenue, which is in turn part of total revenue along with "non-transport" or "non-operational" revenue.

Total "transport" or "operational" expenses are a part of total expenses along with "non-transport" or "non-operational" expenses. Total transport expenses may include expansion projects if they are paid for by the operator.

== Asia ==
Please note that, the "operating ratio" (Japanese: 営業係数 Korean: 영업계수) commonly published by some Asian systems is different from farebox recovery ratio even after inverting the number to turn cost per unit revenue into revenue per unit cost, as that figure includes all operating revenue (notably including many Asian railways' large real estate portfolios, which constitute a large share of their income) instead of only the fare revenue.

Country or Region	System	Ratio	Fare system	Year
Hong Kong	Mass Transit Railway (MTR)	106.76%	Mostly Distance based	2021
Hong Kong	Hong Kong Tramway	48.80%	Flat rate	2021
Hong Kong	Kowloon Motor Bus	100.05%	Route-specific	2021
Hong Kong	Long Win Bus	77.91%	Route-specific	2021
Hong Kong	Citybus	72.98%	Route-specific	2021
Hong Kong	New World First Bus	76.73%	Route-specific	2021
Japan	JR Central Rail	245.95%	Distance based	FY2018
Japan	JR East Rail	142.44%	Distance based	FY2018
Japan	JR West Rail	132.38%	Distance based	FY2018
Japan	JR Kyushu Rail	111.34%	Distance based	FY2018
Japan	JR Shikoku Rail	69.84%	Distance based	FY2018
Japan	JR Hokkaido Rail	59.18%	Distance based	FY2018
Japan	JR Freight Freight rail	96.25%	Distance based	FY2018
Japan	Sapporo Municipal Subway	220.79%	Distance based	FY2018
Japan	Sapporo Streetcar	104.31%	Flat rate	FY2018
Japan	Hakodate Streetcar	82.87%	Distance based	FY2018
Japan	Sendai Subway	159.68%	Mixed zonal and distance based	FY2018
Japan	Tokyo Metro	161.55%	Distance based	FY2018
Japan	Tokyo Toei rail services	74%	Distance based	2015
Japan	Tokyo Toei Subway	171.46%	Distance based	FY2018
Japan	Tokyo Toei Streetcar	83.39%	Flat rate	FY2018
Japan	Tokyo Toei elevated rail	109.84%	Flat rate	FY2018
Japan	Tokyo Toei other rails	136.81%	Distance based	FY2018
Japan	Yokohama Municipal Subway	232.28%	Distance based	FY2018
Japan	Meitetsu Railway	155.99%	Distance based	FY2018
Japan	Meitetsu Tramway	90.70%	Distance based	FY2018
Japan	Nagoya Municipal Subway	167.24%	Distance based	FY2018
Japan	Kintetsu Railway Rail	152.77%	Distance based	FY2018
Japan	Kintetsu Railway Cable	36.70%	Various	FY2018
Japan	Nankai Electric Railway Rail	161.26%	Distance based	FY2018
Japan	Nankai Electric Railway Cable	31.12%	Flat rate	FY2018
Japan	Keihan Electric Railway Rail	166.51%	Distance based	FY2018
Japan	Keihan Electric Railway Subway	29.05%	Distance based	FY2018
Japan	Keihan Electric Railway Streetcar	73.08%	Distance based	FY2018
Japan	Keihan Electric Railway Cable	71.73%	Flat rate	FY2018
Japan	Hankyu Railway	123%	Distance based	1991
Japan	Hankyu Railway	169.74%	Distance based	FY2018
Japan	Hanshin Electric Railway	146.75%	Distance based	FY2018
Japan	Osaka Municipal Transportation Bureau	137%	Distance based	1991
Japan	Osaka Metro Subway	208.51%	Distance based	FY2018
Japan	Osaka Metro APM/AGT	105.35%	Distance based	FY2018
Japan	Kyoto Municipal Subway	201.04%	Distance based	FY2018
Japan	Kobe Municipal Subway	169.52%	Distance based	FY2018
Japan	Nishi-Nippon Railroad Rail	149.92%	Distance based	FY2018
Japan	Fukuoka City Subway	205.38%	Distance based	FY2018
Japan	Kitakyushu Monorail	144.15%	Tabular	FY2018
Japan	Nagasaki Electric Tramway	105.11%	Flat rate	FY2018
Japan	Kumamoto Tram	102.60%	Flat rate	FY2018
Japan	Kagoshima Tram	98.36%	Flat rate	FY2018
Japan	Okinawa Urban Monorail	187.55%	Distance based	FY2018
Pakistan	Lahore Metrobus	37.2%	Flat rate	2014
Taiwan	Taipei Mass Rapid Transit	87.64%	Distance based	2021
Taiwan	Kaohsiung Mass Rapid Transit	52.57%	Distance based	2020
Singapore	SMRT Corporation (Singapore)	101%	Distance based	2018
China	Beijing Subway	22%	Flat rate	2013
China	Beijing Subway	35.08%	Distance based	2021
China	Shenzhen Metro	82.20%	Distance based	2021
China	Guangzhou Metro	77.05%	Distance based	2021

== Europe ==
Country	Region / City	System	Ratio	Fare system	Year
Austria	Vienna	Vienna U-Bahn	49%	Flat rate	2008
Germany	Berlin	Berliner Verkehrsbetriebe	70%	Zone based	2010
Belgium	Brussels	Brussels Intercommunal Transport Company	35%		2007
Czechia	Prague	Prague Integrated Transport	17%	Flat rate	2022
Denmark	Copenhagen	Copenhagen Metro	95.2%	Zone based	2025
Denmark	Jutland, Funen, Zealand	Danske Statsbaner	59%	Zone based	2025
France	Paris	Île-de-France Mobilités	38%	Flat rate (Note: Île-de-France is divided into 5 concentric zones starting from Paris. As of 2026, only weekly, monthly, and yearly Navigo subscriptions, can still be purchased at a fare including only either zones 2-3, 3-4, or 4-5, alongside the "all zones" option. All tickets and other subscriptions automatically include all zones.)	2018
Germany	Munich	Munich Transport and Tariff Association	70%	Zone based	2010
Italy	Milan	Milan Transportation System	49%		2016
Italy	Rome	Rome Metro	36%		2007
Netherlands	Amsterdam	Gemeentelijk Vervoerbedrijf Amsterdam	88%	Distance based	2018
Netherlands	Rotterdam	Rotterdamse Elektrische Tram	99%	Distance based	2018
Poland	Warsaw	ZTM	37%		2019
Spain	Catalonia	Metropolitan lines of Ferrocarrils de la Generalitat de Catalunya (Catalonia)	93%	Zone based	2014
Spain	Madrid	Madrid Metro	41%		2007
Sweden	Stockholm	Storstockholms Lokaltrafik	52%	Flat rate	2017
Sweden	Kalmar County	Kalmar länstrafik	43%	Zone based	2023
Sweden	Östergötland County	Östgötatrafiken	47%	Zone based	2024
Switzerland	Zurich	Zürich S-Bahn	60%	Zone based	2014
Finland	Helsinki	Helsinki Regional Transport Authority	49%	Zone based	2019
Turkey	Istanbul	Metro Istanbul A.S.	90%	Flat rate	2019
United Kingdom	London	London Underground	129.50%	Zone based	2022-2023
United Kingdom	London	London Overground and Docklands Light Railway	94%	Zone based	2018–19

== North America ==
=== Canada ===
Canada Farebox recovery rate
Region	Operator	Fare Revenue ($000s, CAD)	Operating Expenses ($000s, CAD)	Ratio	Fare System	Year
Nationwide	VIA Rail	$408,400	$812,500	50.3%	Distance & demand based	2023
British Columbia Coast	BC Ferries	$759,073	$985,196	77%	Flat rate	2025
Brampton	Brampton Transit	$125,102	$233,752	53.5%	Flat rate	2024
Calgary	Calgary Transit	$147,400	$437,900	33.7%	Flat rate	2023
Edmonton	Edmonton Transit System	$123,841	$623,513	19.9%	Flat rate	2024
Mississauga	MiWay	$101,400	$215,800	47%	Flat rate	2024
Montreal	Société de transport de Montréal			46%	Flat rate	2016
Ottawa	OC Transpo	$289,773	$724,386	40.0%	Flat rate	2024
Quebec City	Réseau de transport de la Capitale			39%	Flat rate	2011
Greater Toronto and Hamilton Area	GO Transit	$429,200	$1,816,900	23.6%	Distance based	2023
Toronto	Toronto Transit Commission	$937,934	$2,392,245	39.2%	Flat rate	2023
Vancouver	TransLink			46.4%	Zone based; transition to distance based upcoming	2024
Victoria	BC Transit (Victoria regional transit system)			28.4%	Flat rate	2022
Winnipeg	Winnipeg Transit	$92,544	$218,985	42.3%	Flat rate	2024
Regional Municipality of York	York Region Transit	$75,000	$304,291	24.6%	Flat rate	2024

=== United States ===
Region	System Operator	Fare Revenue	Operating Expenses	Ratio	Fare System	Year
Nationwide	Amtrak	$2,991,500,000	$3,626,800,000	81.1%	Distance & demand based	2024
Montgomery County MD, DC	RideOn	$5,276,327	$178,136,970	3%	Flat Rate	2023
Northern Virginia, DC	VRE (Virginia Railway Express)	$28,000,000	$190,000,000	15%	Distance based	2023
Boston, MA-NH-RI	MBTA	$545,414,783.00	$1,556,792,859.00	20.5%	Flat rate	2023
New York-Newark, NY-NJ-CT	NYC Ferry	$25,324,000.00	$79,358,000.00	31.9%	Flat rate	2025
New York-Newark, NY-NJ-CT	MTA Bus Company	$189,205,000.00	$968,000,000.00	19.5%	Flat rate	2025
New York-Newark, NY-NJ-CT	MTA Long Island Rail Road	$695,229,000.00	$2,280,000,000.00	30.5%	Zone based	2025
New York-Newark, NY-NJ-CT	MTA Metro-North Railroad	$661,156,000.00	$2,047,000,000.00	32.30%	Zone based	2025
New York-Newark, NY-NJ-CT	MTA New York City Transit	$3,667,107,000.00	$12,271,000,000.00	29.9%	Flat rate	2025
New York-Newark, NY-NJ-CT	MTA Staten Island Railway	$3,775,000.00	$82,000,000.00	4.6%	Flat rate	2025
New York-Newark, NY-NJ-CT	PATH	$189,085,000.00	$365,523,000.00	51.73%	Flat rate	2026
New York-Newark, NY-NJ-CT	Roosevelt Island Tramway	$6,050,916.00				2026
New York-Newark, NY-NJ-CT	NYCDOT	$0.00	$91,211,000.00	0%	Free (Staten Island Ferry and Hart Island Ferry)	2025
New York-Newark, NY-NJ-CT	NJTransit	$743,742,067.00	$2,325,547,904.00	31.98%	Zone based on most Buses and all commuter trains Flat Rate on some buses and all light rails	2020
New York-Newark, NY-NJ-CT	Nassau Inter-County Express	$33,186,987.00	$171,780,424.00	19.32%	Flat rate	2025
New York-Newark, NY-NJ-CT	Bee-Line Bus System	$17,197,904.00	$183,664,357.00	9.36%	Flat rate	2025
Chicago, IL-IN	CTA	$236,301,686.00	$1,436,453,698.00	16.45%	Flat rate	2020
Chicago, IL-IN	METRA	$102,350,491.00	$710,195,494.00	14.41%	Zone based	2020
Atlanta, GA	Metropolitan Atlanta Rapid Transit Authority	$82,246,000.00	$717,893,000.00	11.45%	Flat rate	2025
Portland, OR-WA	TriMET	$94,456,931.00	$518,451,362.00	18.22%	Flat rate	2020
Baltimore, MD	MTA	$102,029,183.00	$805,145,982.00	12.67%	Variable	2020
San Diego, CA	SDMTS	$78,709,562.00	$291,553,478.00	27.00%	Flat rate	2020
Houston, TX	Houston Metro	$37,305,222.00	$587,595,095.00	6.35%		2020
Miami, FL	County of Miami-Dade (Transportation & Public Work)	$47,456,089.00	$553,336,216.00	8.58%	Flat rate	2020
Denver-Aurora, CO	RTD	$76,264,572.00	$623,982,843.00	12.22%	Zone Based	2020
Pittsburgh, PA	PRT	$79,071,495.00	$434,687,600.00	18.19%		2020
Dallas-Fort Worth-Arlington, TX	DART	$43,547,629.00	$569,628,198.00	7.64%	Flat rate	2020
Honolulu, HI	City and County of Honolulu (Department of Transportation Services)	$46,815,334.00	$278,447,442.00	16.81%		2020
San Francisco-Oakland, CA	SFMTA	$153,699,058.00	$903,485,983.00	17.01%	Flat rate	2020
San Francisco-Oakland, CA	BART	$299,731,741.00	$1,048,144,667	28.59%	Distance based	2026
San Francisco-Oakland, CA	AC Transit	$66,561,904.00	$501,047,399.00	13.28%		2020
San Francisco-Oakland, CA	Oakland Airport Connector			96%	Flat rate	2015–2016
Minneapolis-St. Paul, MN-WI	Metro Transit	$40,804,932.00	$413,038,880.00	9.88%	Flat rate with rush hour and express surcharges	2020
Los Angeles-Long Beach-Anaheim, CA	Orange County Transportation Authority	$42,450,631.00	$268,394,220.00	15.82%		2020
Los Angeles-Long Beach-Anaheim, CA	LA Metro	$199,728,314.00	$1,841,473,552.00	10.85%	Flat rate	2020
Los Angeles-Long Beach-Anaheim, CA	Long Beach Transit	$10,201,475.00	$92,339,794.00	11.05%		2020
Los Angeles-Long Beach-Anaheim, CA	Big Blue Bus	$6,438,008	$85,659,665	7.5%	Flat rate	2025
Phoenix-Mesa, AZ	Valley Metro	$21,292,051.00	$208,489,994.00	10.21%		2020
San Antonio, TX	VIA Metropolitan Transit	$15,033,510.00	$222,032,078.00	6.77%	Flat rate	2020
St. Louis, MO-IL	St. Louis Metro	$30,986,092.00	$282,175,101.00	10.98%		2020
San Jose-Sunnyvale-Santa Clara, CA	VTA	$28,886,823.00	$403,260,461.00	7.16%		2020
Buffalo, NY	NFTA	$34,814,699.00	$141,163,925.00	24.66%		2020
Salt Lake City-West Valley City, UT	UTA	$32,521,480.00	$319,885,004.00	10.17%		2020
Austin-Round Rock- San Marcos, TX	CapMetro	$15,298,332.00	$229,551,099.00	6.66%	Flat rate	2020
Charlotte, NC-SC	CATS	$21,018,416.00	$162,317,729.00	12.95%		2020
Detroit–Warren–Dearborn, MI	DDOT	$13,954,074.00	$101,100,585.00	13.80%	Flat rate	2020
Miami–Fort Lauderdale–West Palm Beach, FL	BCT	$13,814,362.00	$158,832,625.00	8.70%		2020
Milwaukee–Waukesha, WI	MCTS	$16,739,398.00	$141,752,155.00	11.81%		2020
Orlando–Kissimmee–Sanford, FL	Lynx	$13,596,128.00	$139,097,081.00	9.77%	Flat rate	2020
Sacramento, CA	SacRT	$21,517,225.00	$173,873,225.00	12.38%		2020
Cleveland–Elyria, OH	RTA	$26,194,783.00	$259,797,759.00	10.08%	Flat rate	2020
Washington, DC-VA-MD	Washington Metropolitan Area Transit Authority	$492,953,775.00	$2,028,885,121.00	24.30%	Distance based	2020
Washington, DC-VA-MD	Montgomery County, Maryland	$13,387,860.00	$127,225,668.00	10.52%		2020
Seattle, WA	King County Metro bus			8.9%	Flat	2022
Seattle, WA	Washington State Ferries			51%	Route Based	2023
Seattle, WA	Sound Transit Express Bus	$14,403,774	$144,174,454	10%	Zone & distance based	2023
Seattle, WA	Sound Transit Link Light Rail	$32,358,465	$205,314,451	16%	Zone & distance based	2023
Seattle, WA	Sound Transit Sounder Regional Rail	$4,966,273	$65,649,821	8%	Zone & distance based	2023
Seattle, WA	Pierce Transit	$54,164,161	$127,654,974	42%	Flat rate	2021
Albany-Schenectady, NY	CDTA	$20,804,704.00	$93,755,632.00	22.19%		2020
Harrisburg, PA	Capital Area Transit	$2,398,430	$20,278,765	17%	Flat rate	2022
Las Vegas-Henderson, NV	Las Vegas Monorail			56%	Flat rate	2016
Las Vegas-Henderson, NV	RTC	$51,823,479.00	$227,523,119.00	22.78%		2020
Philadelphia, PA-NJ-DE-MD	SEPTA	$353,276,517.00	$1,301,894,928.00	27.14%	Flat rate	2020
Philadelphia, PA-NJ-DE-MD	PATCO	$15,542,809	$63,349,398	25%	Distance based	2023
Orlando, FL	SunRail			7%	Distance based	2018
	Peninsula Corridor Joint Powers Board (Caltrain)			70%	Zone based	2019
	Santa Clara Valley Transportation Authority			10%	Express surcharges	2016
	Southern California Regional Rail Authority (Metrolink)			34%	Distance based	2019

== Oceania ==
Country	Region	System	Ratio	Fare system	Year
Australia	Canberra	ACTION	6.3%	Flat rate	2024
Australia	Brisbane	Translink (Queensland)	2%	Flat rate	2025
Australia	Perth	Transperth	13.6%	Zone & time based	2025
Australia	Adelaide	Adelaide Metro	21%	Zone & time based	2013
Australia	Darwin	Transport in Darwin	10%		
Australia	Hobart	Transport in Hobart	22%		
Australia	Melbourne	Melbourne	30%		2014
Australia	Sydney	Sydney Trains	20%	Distance based	2016
Australia	Sydney	Metropolitan Bus System	25%	Distance based	2016
Australia	Sydney	Sydney Ferries	32%	Distance based	2016
New Zealand	Auckland	Auckland	44%	Zone based	2012–13
New Zealand	Christchurch	Christchurch	35%	Zone based	2012–13
New Zealand	Dunedin	Dunedin	60%	Zone based	2015–16
New Zealand	Hamilton	Hamilton	34%	Flat rate	2012–13
New Zealand	Wellington	Wellington	57%	Zone based	2012–13
