= Mercedes-Benz OC 500 LE =

Spanish Bus chassis made by Mercedes-Benz

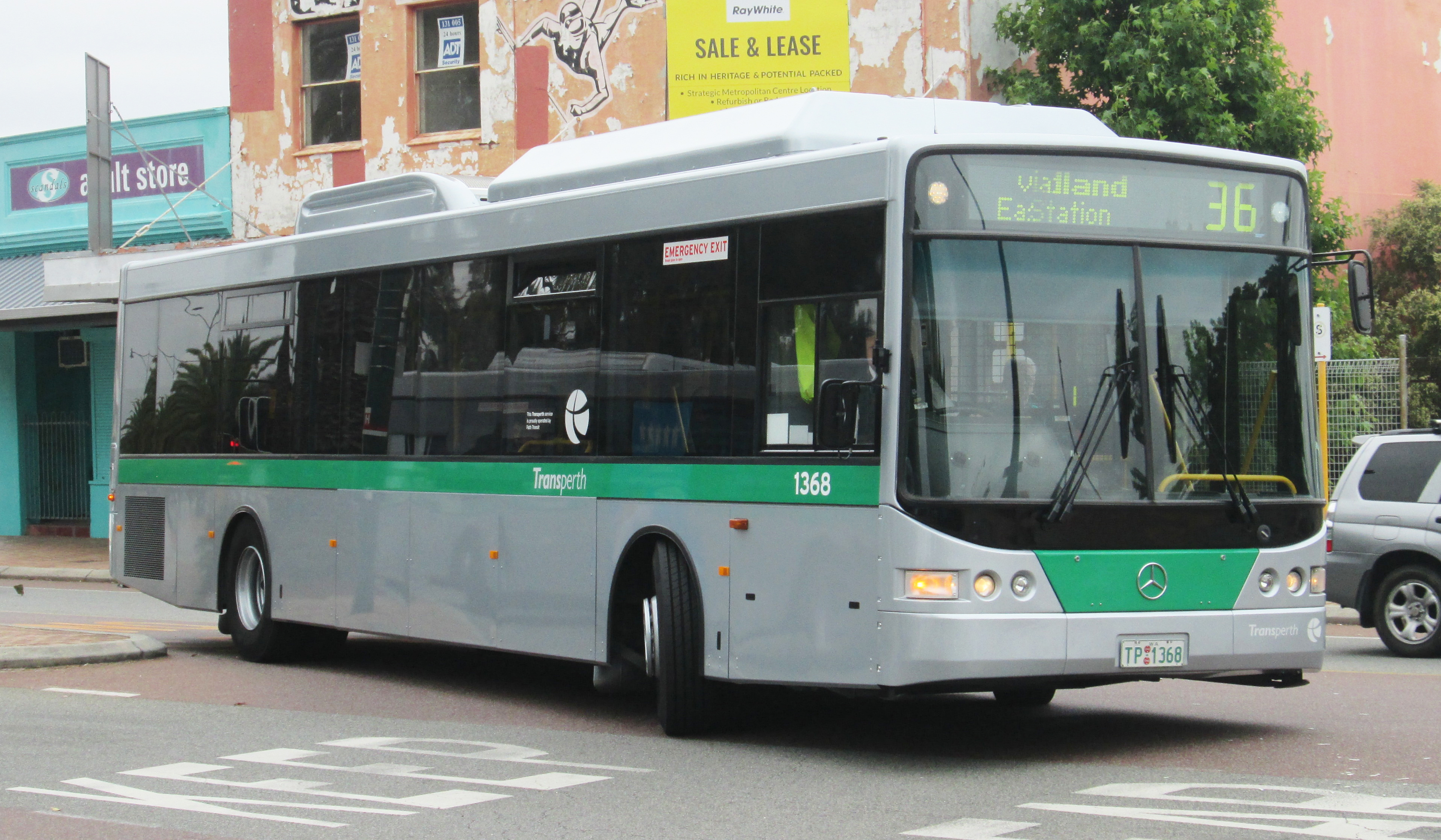
- An OC 500 LE CNG serving as a public transport bus for Transperth in Perth, Western Australia.

Overview
- Manufacturer: Mercedes-Benz
- Production: 2001 - present (EvoBus)
- Assembly: Germany; Spain: Sámano

Body and chassis
- Doors: 1 or 2
- Floor type: Low entry
- Related: Mercedes-Benz OC 500 LF; Mercedes-Benz OC 500 LFA; Mercedes-Benz OC 500 RF

Powertrain
- Engine: Mercedes-Benz OM457hLA; Mercedes-Benz M447hLAG (CNG); Mercedes-Benz OM936 (Euro VI)
- Transmission: Voith; ZF

Dimensions
- Length: 10.8 metres/11.2 metres/11.7 metres/12.0 metres/12.8 metres/13.5 metres (bodied)
- Width: 2.5 m (8 ft 2 in)

Chronology
- Predecessor: Mercedes-Benz O405N/O405NH

The Mercedes-Benz OC 500 LE is a modular, heavy-duty, twin-axle bus chassis produced by Mercedes-Benz/EvoBus Ibérica, Spain. It was designed as a modular platform for low-entry city, suburban, and intercity buses with a maximum gross vehicle weight of 19.1 tonnes. The main modules consist of: driver's pedestal, front axle, buggy centre section, drive axle and engine. It has much in common with the chassis used for the Mercedes-Benz Citaro integral bus range, and also the raised floor OC 500 RF coach chassis. The engine is horizontally mounted over the rear overhang.

Mercedes-Benz in Brazil manufacture a low-entry chassis known as the O 500 U, which is related to the OC 500 LE, but is not identical. It is also available as the articulated O 500 UA and the quad-axle articulated O 500 UDA, with the latter giving a vehicle length of 23 metres. The O 500 U is also available in Australia, marketed as OH1830LE.

== Technical details ==
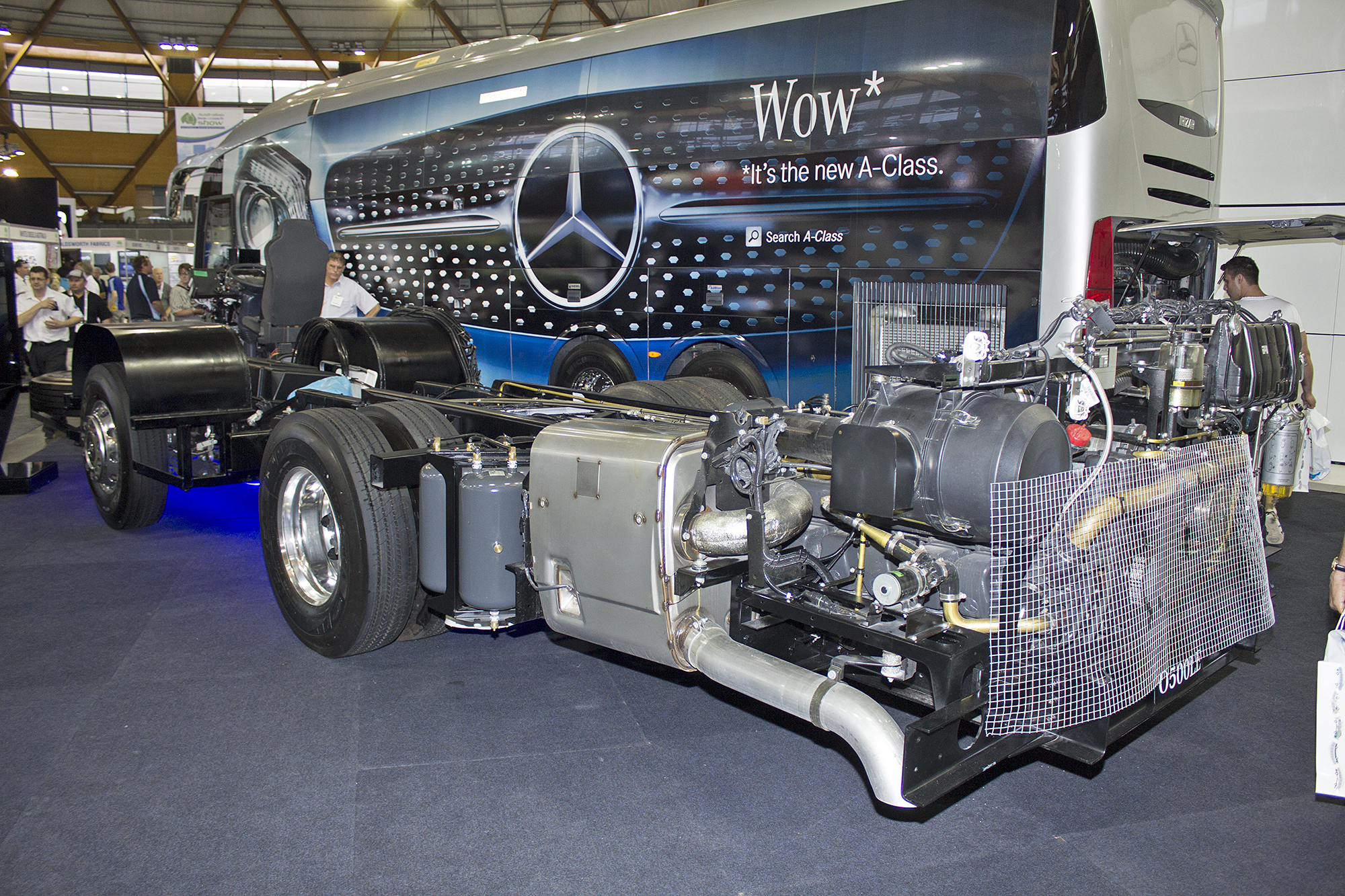
Mercedes-Benz OC 500 LE chassis on display at the 2013 Australian Bus & Coach Show

=== Variations ===
OC 500 LE 1825h

- Engine type: OM 457 hLA (Euro III) inline 6-cylinder 11.967-litre turbocharged intercooled, direct injection diesel
- Power: 185 kW (252 hp) @ 2000 rpm
- Torque: 1100 N m (811 ft·lbf) @ 1100 rpm

OC 500 LE 1825hG

- Engine type: M 447 hLAG (Euro IV/Euro V/EEV) inline 6-cylinder 11.967-litre turbocharged intercooled, lean burn, spark ignition single point injection CNG
- Power: 185 kW (252 hp) @ 2000 rpm
- Torque: 1050 N m (774 ft·lbf) @ 1000-1400 rpm

OC 500 LE 1830h

- Engine type: OM 457 hLA (Euro III/Euro IV/Euro V/EEV) inline 6-cylinder 11.967-litre turbocharged intercooled, direct injection diesel
- Power: 220 kW (299 hp) @ 2000 rpm
- Torque: 1250 N m (921 ft·lbf) @ 1100 rpm

OC 500 LE Euro VI

- Engine type: OM 936 (Euro VI) inline 6-cylinder 7.698-litre turbocharged intercooled, direct injection diesel
- Power: 220 kW (299 hp) @ 1200 rpm
- Torque: 1200 N m @ 1200-1600 rpm

Initially available with Euro III engines, the OC 500 LE chassis got upgraded to Euro IV, Euro V and EEV-compliant diesel engines using AdBlue Selective Catalytic Reduction technology. With Euro IV, Euro V and EEV, the 252 hp rating of the OM 457 hLA was discontinued, making the 299 hp engine as standard for the OC 500 LE. It is also available with the OM 936 engine in Euro VI markets.

=== Transmissions ===
Currently for OC 500s, Mercedes-Benz only offers a ZF EcoLife 6-speed automatic transmission with integrated hydraulic retarder (model 6 AP 1200 B for the 252 hp CNG engine or model 6 AP 1400 B for the 299 hp diesel engine). Previously available was the Voith D864.3E 4-speed automatic transmission as well as the ZF Ecomat 5 HP 502/592 5-speed and 6 HP 502/592 6-speed automatic transmissions.

For South American O500Us, Voith Diwa 4-speed automatic transmission and ZF EcoLife 6-speed automatic transmission are offered.

== Orders ==
=== Australia ===
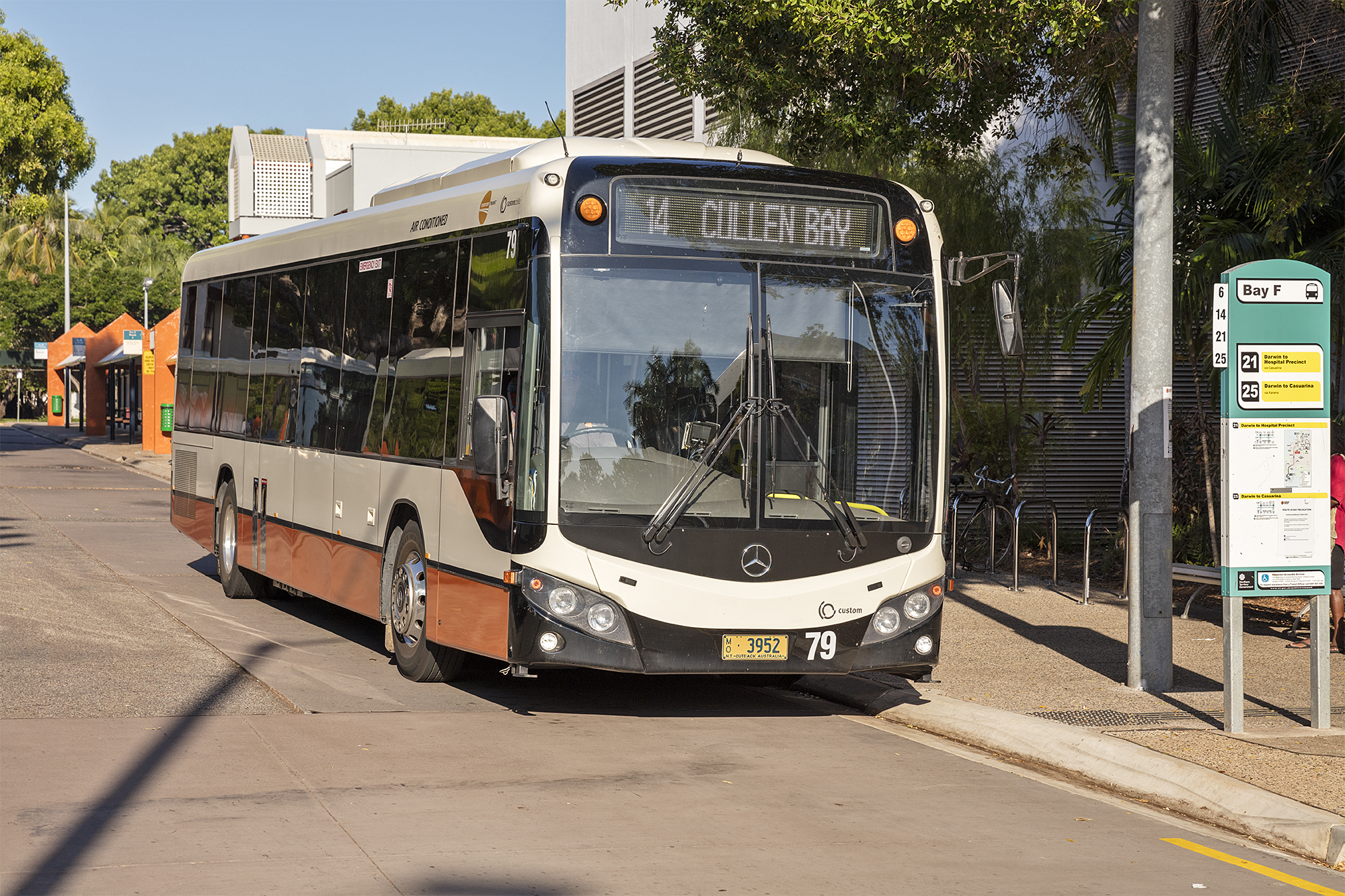
Territory Transit Custom Coaches CB80 bodied O 500LE

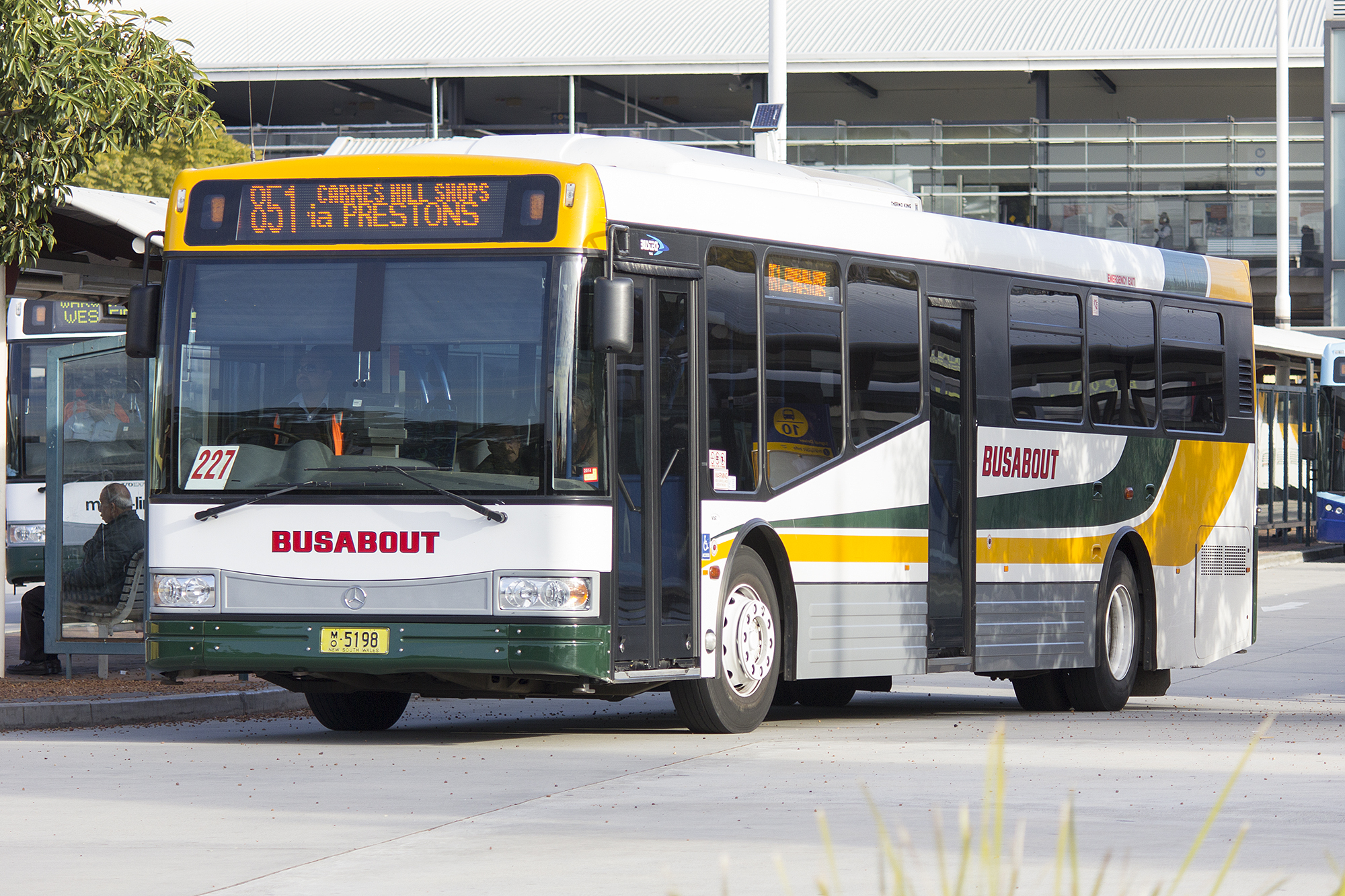
Busabout Sydney Bustech bodied O 500 LE

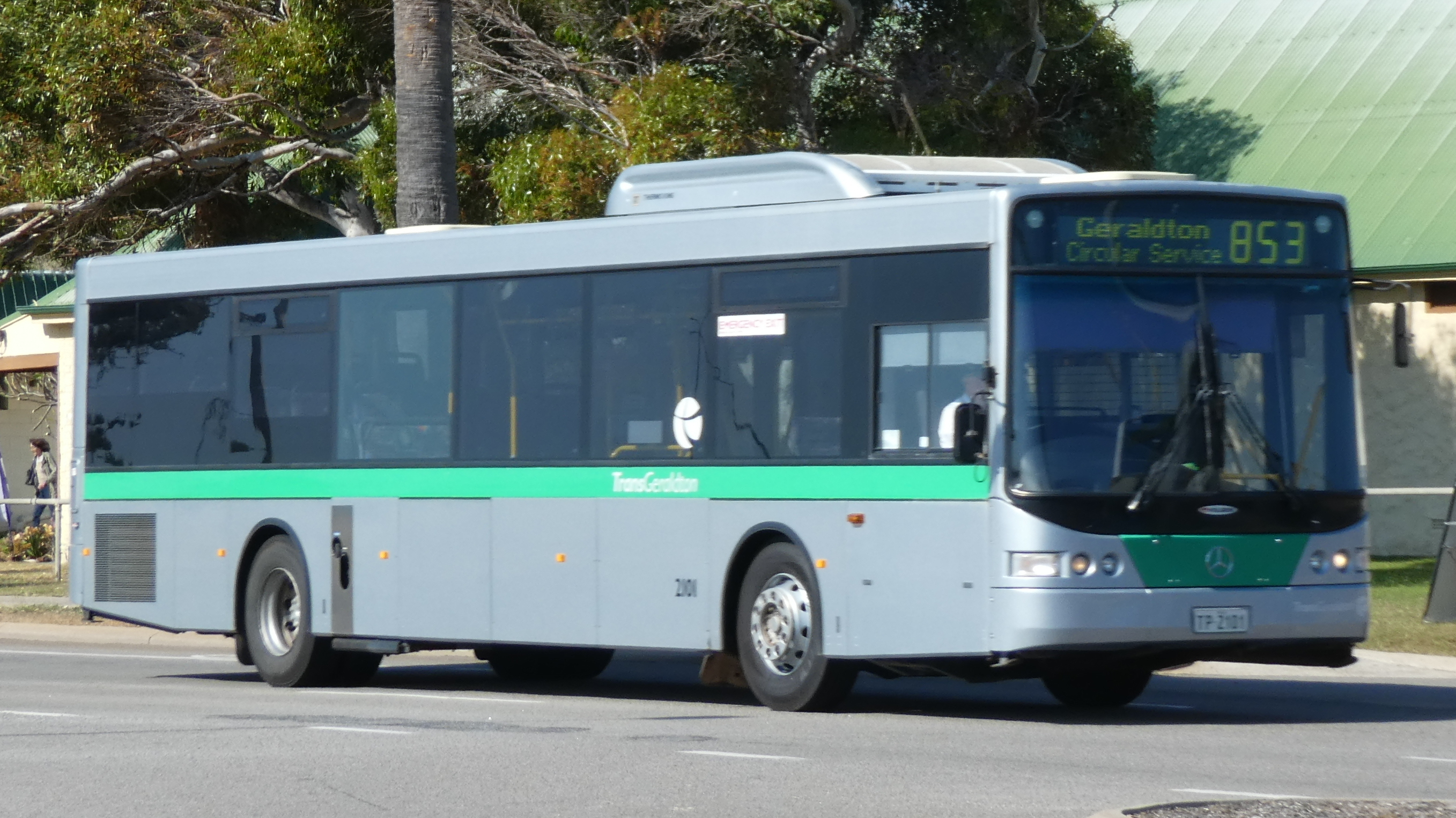
TransGeraldton Volgren CR228L bodied Mercedes-Benz OC500LE

Large numbers of buses built on the OC 500 LE chassis can be found in Australia, where it was originally marketed as the O 500LE. then got renamed as the Mercedes OC 500 LE. Now, it is marketed here like in the world, as OC 500 LE.

Transperth operate 540 Volgren bodied examples, 474 being CNG powered. There have been 15 OC 500 LE CNG fires in Perth, and in October 2013, the Public Transport Authority commenced legal action against Mercedes-Benz, Evobus and Volgren. The action was dropped in 2014.

Sydney Buses purchased 255 CNG and 20 diesel powered examples, all with Custom Coaches bodies, however one CNG example (m/o 4878) was destroyed by fire in June 2011. This bus was then replaced in the Sydney Buses fleet with the Custom Bus CB80 demonstrator O500LE, now bearing registration m/o 4878 and body number 08-001.

The O500LE CNG models are powered by the M447hLAG 252HP engine, as noted above in OC 500LE CNG 1825hG.

There are two gas tanks (indicated by two CNG stickers on number plate) located on top of the bus near the front. Metal pipes run on the offside roof to the back of the bus. Because the gas tanks are in the front, the air conditioning unit is placed at the rear of the roof. The gas tank placement is counter-intuitive, but this is due to the various weight requirements imposed by the RMS.

Other purchasers included Ventura Bus Lines (72), Brisbane Transport (40), Premier Illawarra (38), Kefford Corporation (19) and Darwin Bus Service (14).

Many operators across Australia have now purchased the OC 500 LE in various configurations. Problems related to quality control and unreliable electronics have not been uncommon. A lot of these complaints have come from drivers due to some units being under-powered, uncomfortable or rough.

Brisbane Transport withdrew its OC 500 LEs from the fleet for a short period because of a major unidentified fault which caused buses to suddenly accelerate without warning. This problem was fixed by Mercedes-Benz and these vehicles are now back on the road. However, as they were under lease from Mercedes-Benz, their lease expired in 2013 and were then sold to Transit Systems NSW where they currently operate.

In January 2009, Mercedes-Benz Australia issued a recall on 443 CNG-fuelled OC 500 LE units due to respecified welding specifications for the turbocharger oil supply pipe.

=== Singapore ===
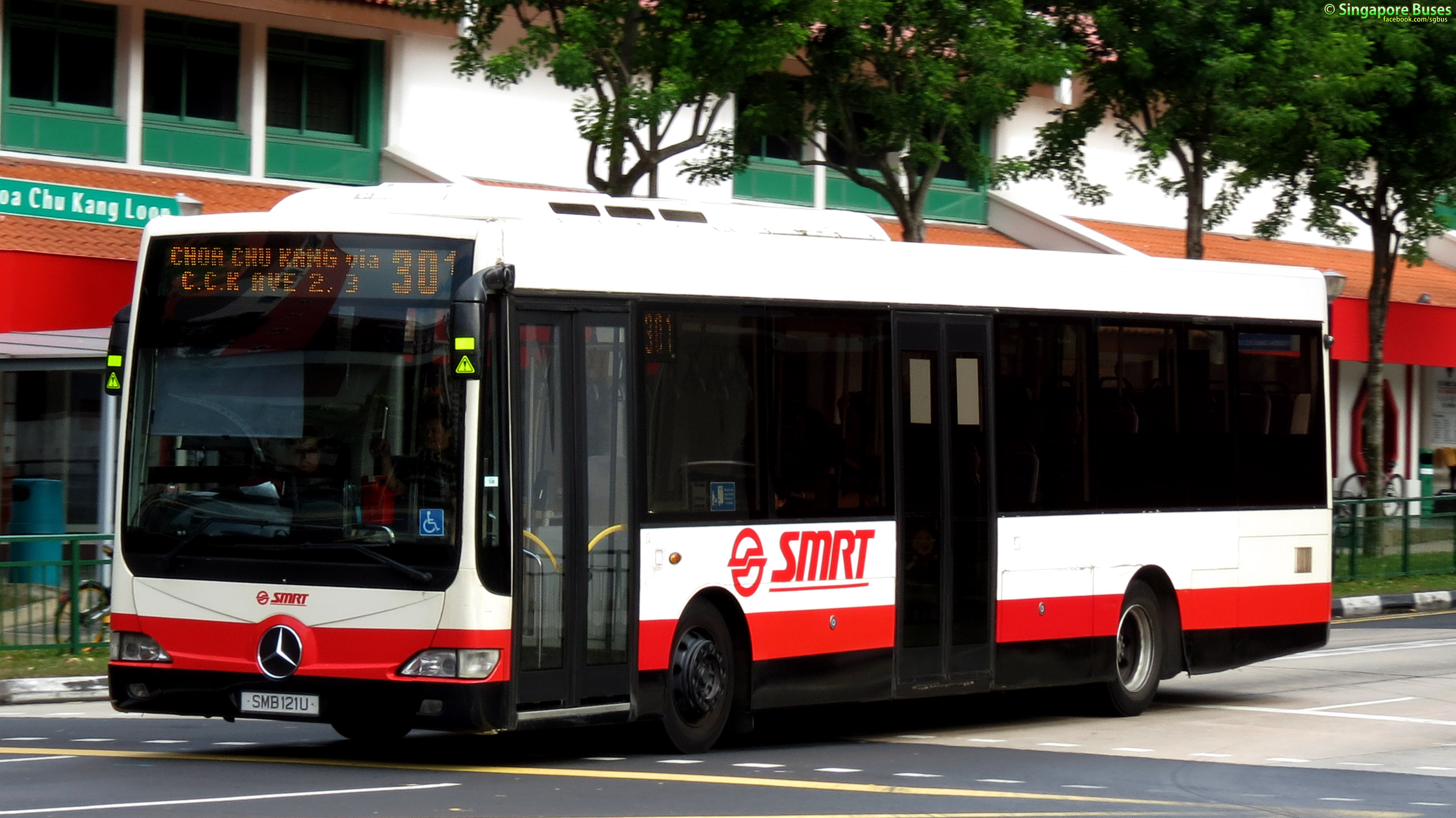
A Mercedes-Benz OC500LE in Singapore, operated by SMRT Buses on Service 301

SMRT Buses had procured 134 Mercedes-Benz OC500LE sets for fleet replacement and expansion. These buses feature bodywork built by Gemilang Coachworks of Malaysia and assembled by Thonburi Busbody Limited of Thailand, with a CapaCity licensed front from Mercedes-Benz, engines that meet Euro V emission standards, and are also SMRT Buses' first wheelchair accessible buses. They were the first to feature voice announcement systems, with announcements similar to the ones used on the Singapore MRT. They are also the first buses in Southeast Asia to be fitted with Euro 5 compliant engine. The last bus to be registered, SMB134H, was registered on 1 October 2009.

The first Mercedes-Benz OC500LE (SMB1H) took part in the launch of SMRT Buses' Go Green event on 30 April 2008, and debuted on high-demand Bus 190. Several years later, SMB1H was converted into a permanent training bus based at Kranji Depot (KJDEP). The OC500LE buses were delivered in two batches, both featuring Vogelsitze System 601 seats similar to those of the Scania K230UB (Euro IV, Batch 2) units. Batch 1 units feature red, black & cadmium yellow seat covers, while batch 2 units feature blue, purple & red seat covers. They are all powered by the Mercedes-Benz OM457hLA engine (11,967cc) and fitted with a ZF Ecomat 6HP 592C 6-speed automatic transmission.

In 2019, these buses went for midlife refurbishment. They were given a fresh coat of paint on the interior walls and batch 1 units would have their seat covers replaced with blue and red seat covers as part of the standardised SMRT's specifications. In 2025, All buses have a keep volume low sticker pasted (except SMB1H & SMB4A).

Between 2019 & 2020, All units were repainted with standard Land Transport Authority's (LTA) lush green livery. Between September & October 2021, several Mercedes-Benz OC500LE buses were transferred from SMRT Buses to Tower Transit Singapore as part of the Sembawang-Yishun Bus Package, where they would be based at Mandai Bus Depot (MDDEP).

With the Mercedes-Benz OC500LE fleet reaching the end of their 17-year statutory lifespan, few buses were de-registered. Most of the buses were extended up to 20 year statutory lifespan.

=== United Kingdom ===
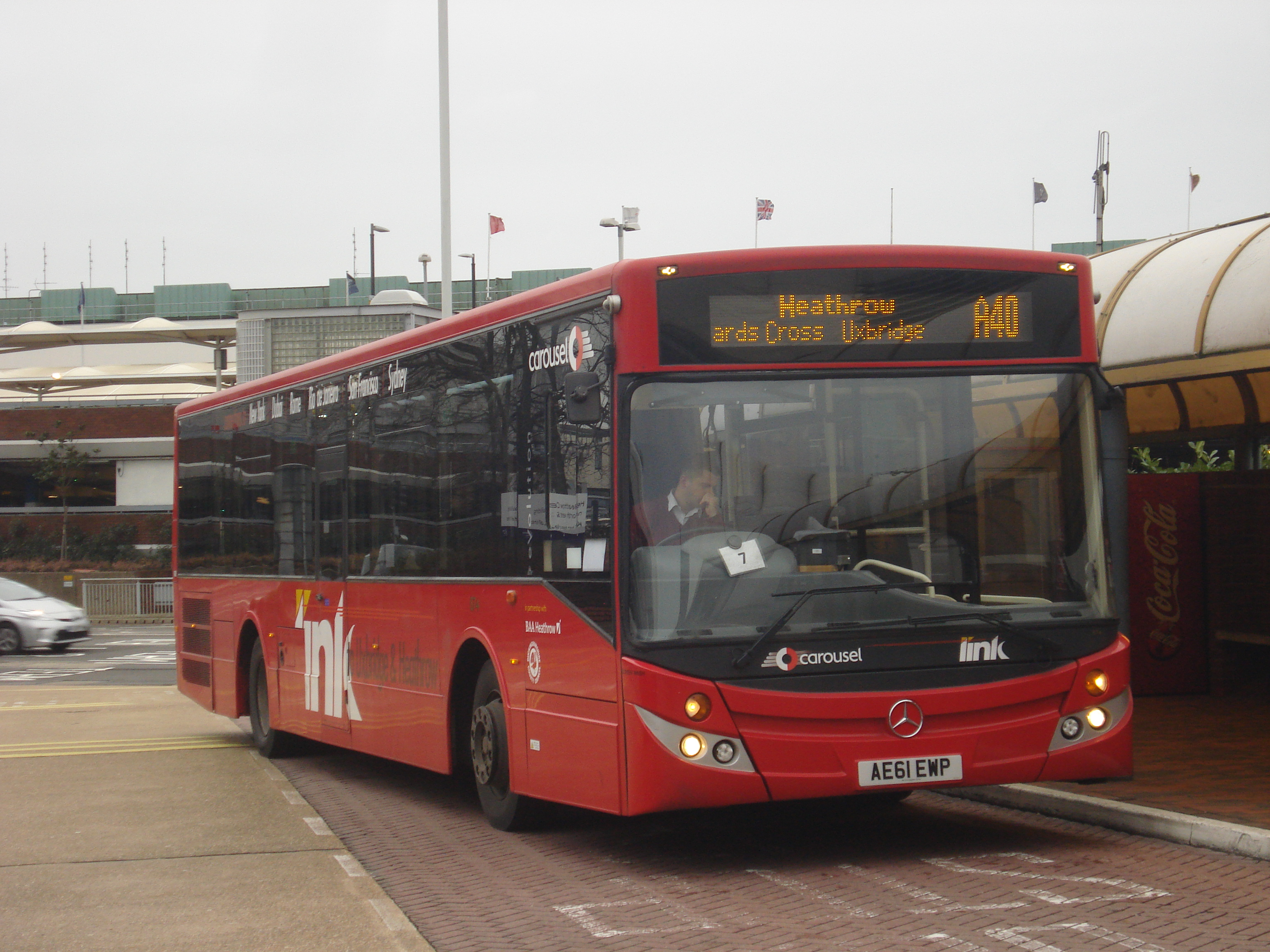
Carousel Buses MCV Evolution bodied OC 500 LE in December 2013

Small numbers of OC 500 LEs bodied by MCV have entered service in the United Kingdom. The first bus was unveiled in March 2010, and was also exhibited at IAA Hanover 2010. A number have been purchased by Carousel Buses for use to and from Heathrow Airport for express services.

=== Norway ===
In 2004, Vest Busscar bodied nine OC 500 LE 1825h with its Center L bodywork for Nettbuss. One was used in the Østfold region, while the other eight entered city traffic in Kristiansund. All eight OC 500 LEs in Kristiansund were exported in 2014, with some of them appearing in Estonia. No other OC 500 LE have been bodied, nor imported to Norway.

=== Portugal ===
- Irmãos Mota Atomic UR2000, UR2005, UR2011, URB2014 and Urbis
- Marcopolo Viale

=== Serbia ===
Ikarbus IK-112LE, in production as of September 2015, used in Belgrade urban and suburban bus system. Ikarbus offers 2 versions, with 2 or 3 sets of doors. More than 60 is produced. Ikarbus offers suburban version with softer anti-vandal seats and a place for hand luggage.

=== Spain ===
- Unvi Urbis
- Hispano Habit
- Hispano Intea
- Burillo
- Sunsundegui Astral
- Castrosúa Magnus
- Noge Intertouring
- Noge Cittour LE
