= KLT =

KLT may refer to:

- Kalmar Länstrafik, a regional transportation authority of Kalmar County, Sweden
- Kanade–Lucas–Tomasi Feature Tracker, a computer vision algorithm
- Karhunen–Loève transform, a mathematical procedure
- Kawamata log terminal, a type of singularity in algebraic geometry
- Kernel-level thread
- Kernev, Leon and Treger, the Breton names for Cornouaille, Leon and Trégor
- Kleinladungsträger, German name to indicate Euro container
- Kids Learning Tube, a YouTube channel that makes educational videos for primary students
