= 10 (Darwinbus) =

Bus route in Darwin, Australia

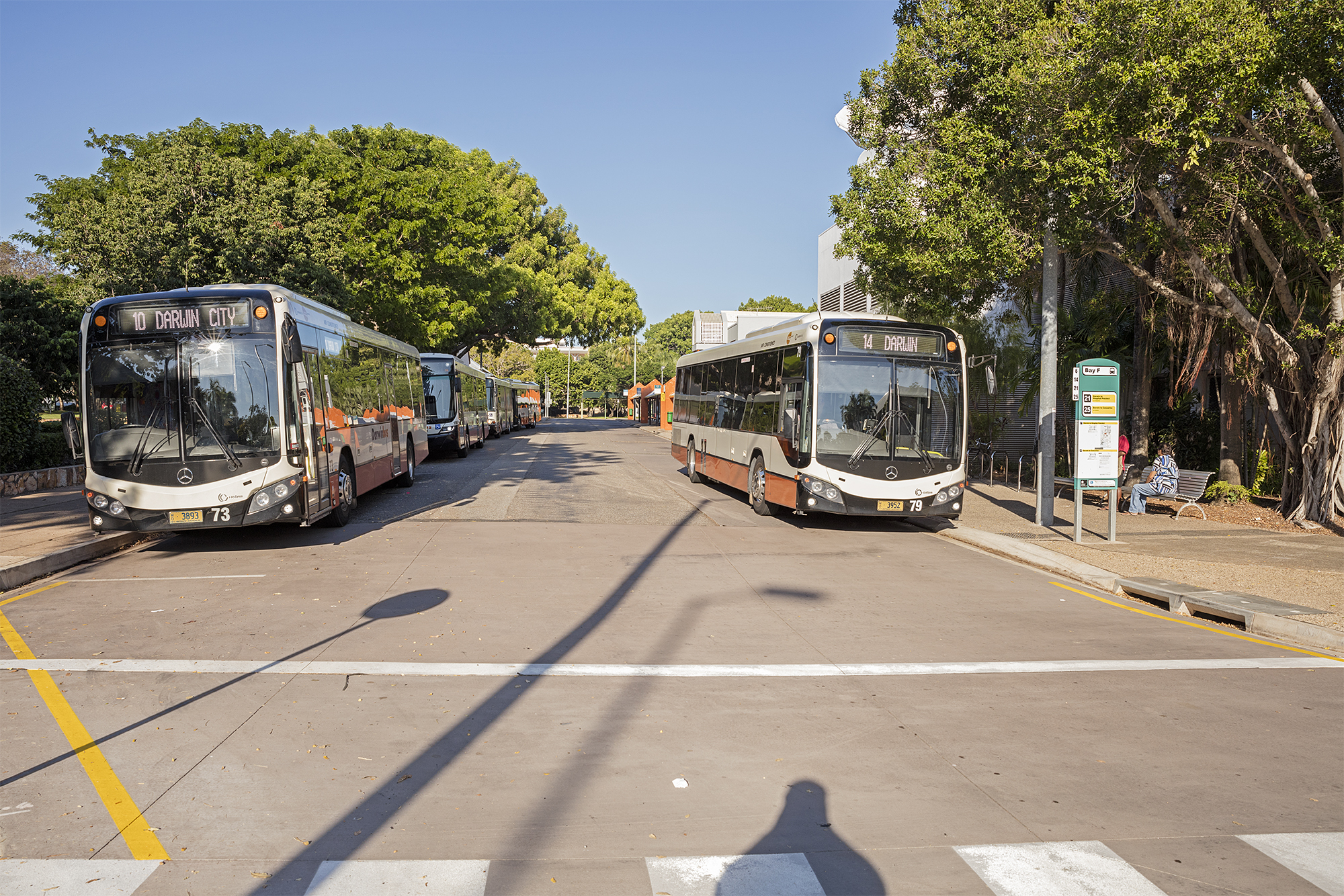
- Route 10 on left, laying over at Darwin Bus Interchange after finishing its route into Darwin City.

Overview
- Operator: Darwinbus
- Began service: 1970s

Route
- Start: Darwin City Harry Chan Ave
- Via: Bagot Road; Trower Road
- End: Casuarina Interchange

Service
- Level: Daily
- Timetable: Route i10 Route o10

Route 10 is the one of the busiest bus routes in Darwin, Australia operated by Darwinbus between Darwin City and Casuarina.

== History ==
The route 10 has been operating in Darwin since bus services began in Darwin under the original government-owned operator, Darwin Bus Service (or DBS for short), operating between the Darwin bus terminus to Casuarina. In 1987, Casuarina Interchange was built moving all urban bus services travelling to and from Casuarina, into the bus interchange. Throughout the existence of Casuarina Interchange, route 10 departed on Bay B, on the side of Bradshaw Terrace. From the late 1990s to 2010, the service ran on a frequent clockface timetable of every 15mins during the day. After timetable adjustments in 2010, the timetable became erratic with unpredictable and patternless frequencies and departure times. In May 2025, the CLP government announced its plans to close the Casuarina and Darwin bus interchanges as part of the NT bus safety reform strategy, which closed on 27 October 2025. Inbound route 10 services stayed at Bay 'B' on the renamed Casuarina Bradshaw Terrace stop while outbound route 10 services were relocated to terminate at Bay 'E' at Casuarina Bradshaw Terrace.

Currently, on weekdays, the route 10 operates every 15 to 10 minutes on peak and up to 35min gaps off-peak. The service is supplemented by sister route No.4 and bus route No.5 both operating to and from Casuarina and Darwin City. Route 10 starts operating at 5:45am in the morning and ends with the last service leaving Darwin City at 9:20pm with it being 11:05 on Friday nights.
