= Operating ratio =

Operating expenses as percent of revenue

In finance, the operating ratio is a company's operating expenses as a percentage of revenue. This financial ratio is most commonly used for industries which require a large percentage of revenues to maintain operations, such as railroads. In railroading, an operating ratio of 80 or lower is considered desirable.

The operating ratio can be used to determine the efficiency of a company's management by comparing operating expenses to net sales. It is calculated by dividing the operating expenses by the net sales. The smaller the ratio, the greater the organization's ability to generate profit. The ratio does not factor in expansion or debt repayment.

Alternatively, it may be expressed as a ratio of sales to cost. In such case, a higher ratio indicates a better ability to generate revenue.

== See also ==
- Farebox recovery ratio
