= Transport in Darwin =

The city of Darwin, Northern Territory is served by a wide variety of transport modes. While the city's main form of transport is private transport on the road network, transport is also available by bus, ferry and aircraft. There is no commuter rail network, although The Ghan long-distance train operates out of Darwin.

== Road ==
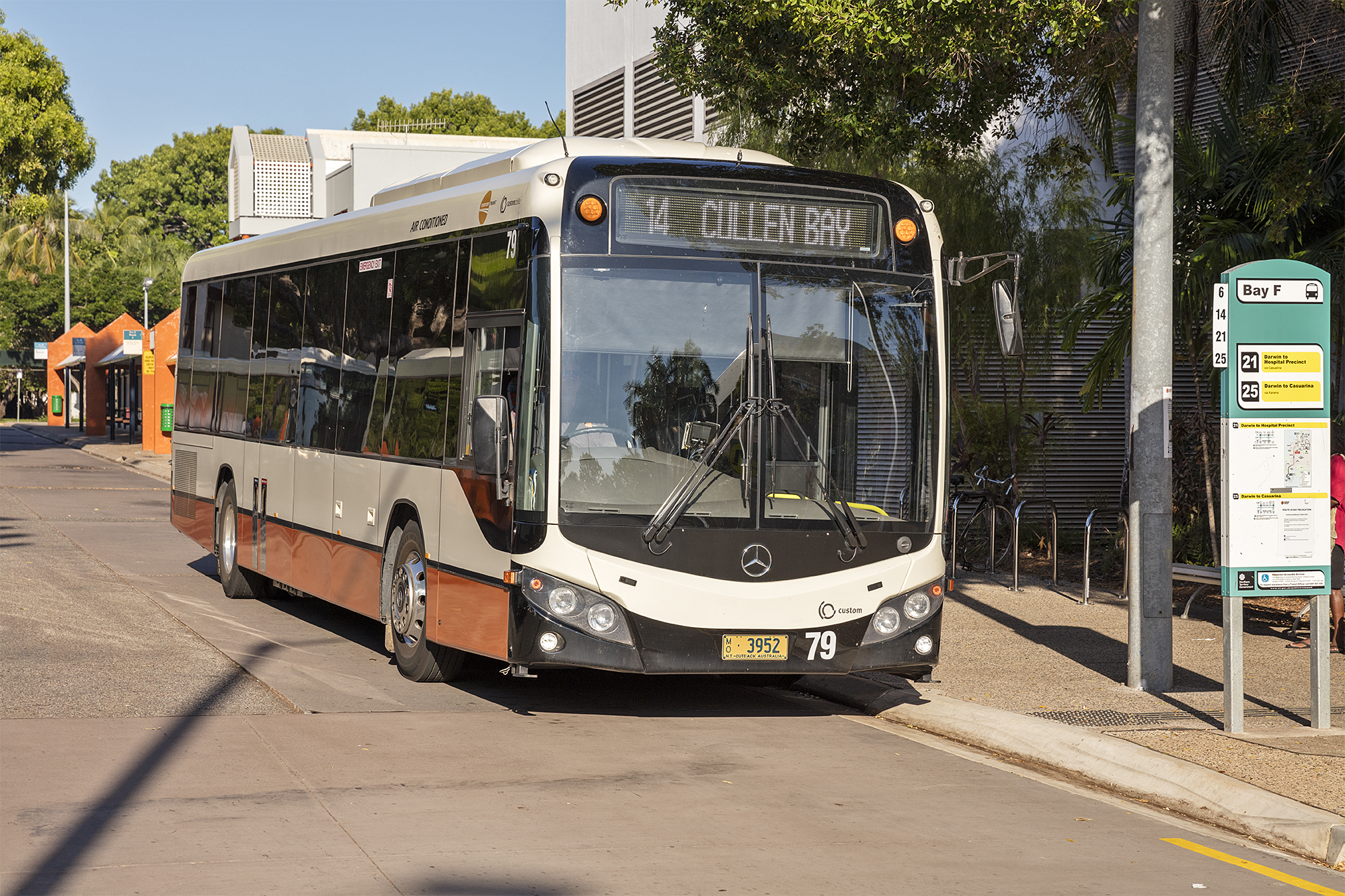
Buses are a major form of public transport in Darwin.

The car is the dominant mode of transport for Darwin residents. The Stuart Highway is the only major highway that services the Darwin area. It connects Darwin to its satellite city of Palmerston, and then goes on to the South Australian city of Port Augusta.

Arterial roads also service the Darwin area, which provide quick and easy access into and out of the city centre.

Public transport is provided by Darwinbus bus services.

Taxis and Limousines operate in the Darwin area. City Radio Taxis holds the largest fleet of taxicabs in Darwin.

== Water ==
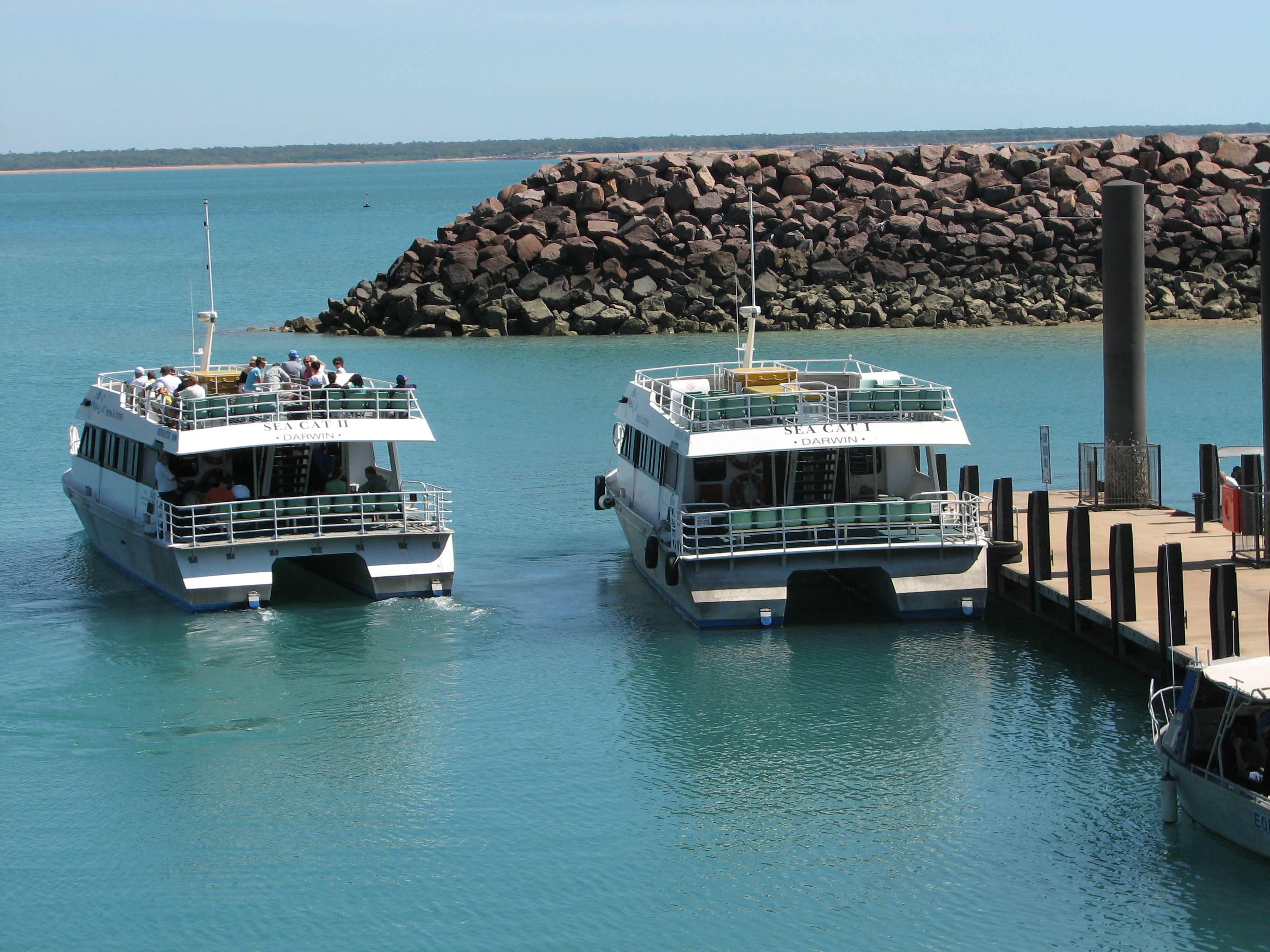
Sea Cat ferries in Cullen Bay

There is limited public transport on Darwin's waterways. There are two ferry services, one of which operates from Darwin Harbour, from between Cullen Bay and Mandorah. The ferry is operated by Sea Cat Ferries. Ferry services operate daily. The other ferry service is from Darwin Harbour and travels to the Tiwi Islands in the Territory's north.

== Cycling ==
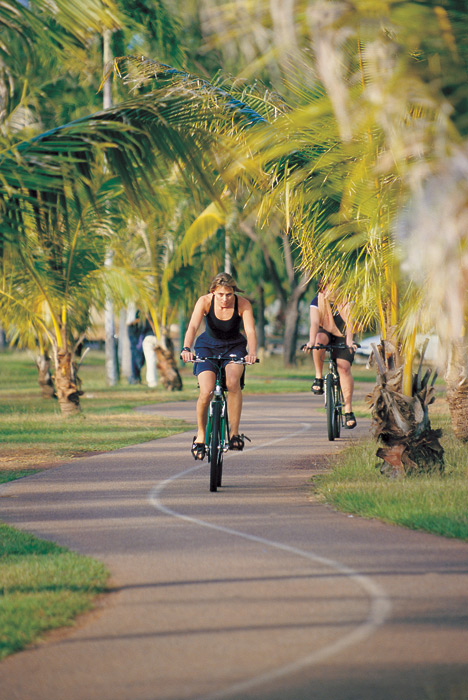
Shared path along the Nightcliff foreshore

Bike riding in Darwin is one of the most popular means of transport. There are more than 70 kilometres of bicycle paths in the Darwin area and into the Palmerston area, south of Darwin. Main bike routes travel along the Stuart Highway and throughout the coastline of the Darwin area as well as the Darwin city centre.

== Airports ==
Darwin is served by Darwin International Airport close to the city's CBD in the Northern Suburbs for regional, domestic and international flights.

== See also ==
- Transport in Australia
- List of Darwin suburbs
- Casuarina Square
