= Casuarina Square =

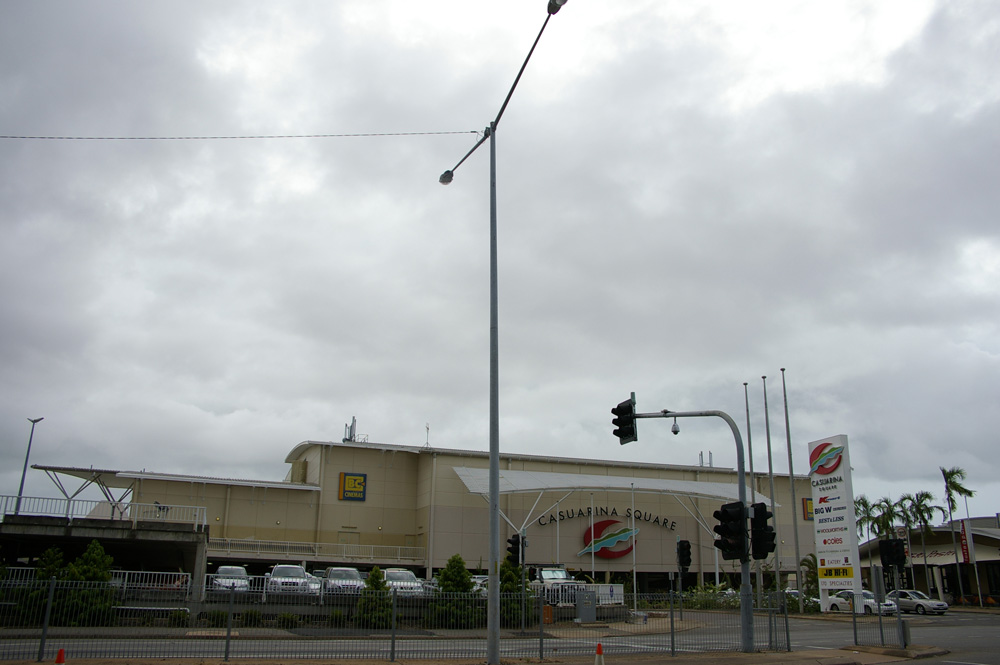
- Casuarina Square viewed from Trower Road
- Location: Casuarina, Northern Territory, Australia
- Coordinates: 12.3753°S 130.8819°E
- Opened: 1973
- Developer: Sentinel Property Group
- Manager: Sentinel Property Group
- Owner: Sentinel Property Group
- Num. of stores: 190+
- Num. of anchor tenants: 4
- Floor area: 56,000 m^{2} (600,000 sq ft)
- Floors: 2 retail levels, 2 car parking levels
- Parking: 2,400+
- Website: www.casuarinasquare.com.au

Casuarina Square is a shopping centre located in Casuarina, a suburb of Darwin, Australia. It is the largest shopping centre in the Northern Territory.

The centre opened in 1973 and has undergone several redevelopments since its establishment. The building is designed to comply with construction standards applicable to tropical cyclone-prone regions.

Casuarina Square contains approximately 190 retail tenancies, including supermarkets, specialty retailers, food outlets, and entertainment facilities.

Casuarina Interchange is located within the confines of Casuarina Square providing public transport to the greater Darwin region.

== History ==
Casuarina Square has undergone four major redevelopments since opening. A significant redevelopment was completed in December 1998 and included the addition of 63 specialty stores and a seven-screen cinema.

In April 2022, the centre was sold by the GPT Group to a Brisbane-based non-listed real estate investment trust. Management of the centre is undertaken by Sentinel Property Group.

== Redevelopment ==
On 21 July 2025, construction commenced on a further redevelopment of Casuarina Square.

The redevelopment includes additional undercover parking, upgrades to public areas, and the introduction of new retail and dining tenancies. Infrastructure to support online grocery collection services was also incorporated as part of the project. The extensions increased the total retail space of Casuarina Square to approximately 56,634 square metres of gross lettable area (GLA), growing from its previous footprint of 54,328 square metres.

The centre has remained open to the public during construction works. Targeting overall completion by mid-2026—which includes a $90M to $100M overhaul transforming The Quarter into the air-conditioned Cas Lane dining, lifestyle, and family entertainment precinct with new additions like iPlay, World Gym, Yo-Chi, and Kickin' Inn, alongside an upgraded Woolworths featuring the NT's first direct-to-boot service. The upgrades opened on 26 October 2026.

== See also ==
- List of shopping centres in Australia
- Public transport in Darwin
