= Casuarina Interchange =

Bus interchange in Darwin, Australia

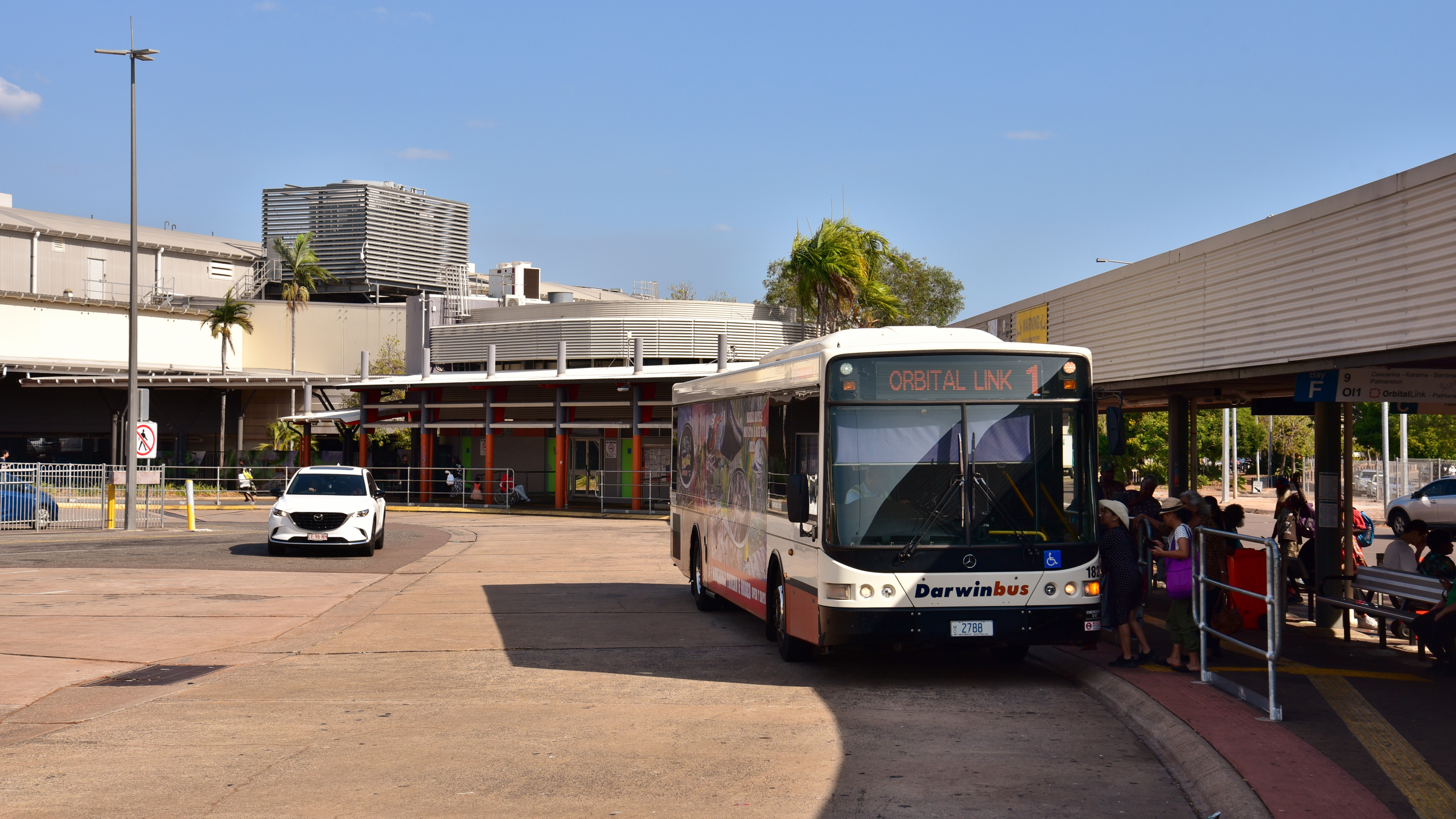
- Bus 182 at former Casuarina Interchange on a OL1 to Palmerston

General information
- Location: Casuarina, Northern Territory
- Owner: Northern Territory Government
- Bus routes: 14
- Bus stands: 7
- Bus operators: CDC Northern Territory

Construction
- Cycle facilities: Yes
- Accessible: Yes

Other information
- Website: NT Department of Infrastructure and Logistics

History
- Opened: 7 July 1987
- Closed: 27 October 2025 (Original)
Location

Casuarina Interchange is a set of 3 bus stops within Casuarina Square, Australia. Before October 2025, all bus services in Casuarina operated from one singular interchange located on Bradshaw Terrace. Due to anti-social behaviour, the NT bus safety reform strategy was implemented thus closing Casuarina Interchange and moving departure points to 3 different locations; Bradshaw Tce, Trower Rd and Scaturchio St. All services are run by Darwinbus and are operated by the sole operator of the network, CDC Northern Territory.

== History ==
Casuarina Interchange opened on 7 July 1987. The then interchange consisted of 11 bus bays (A-K). The interchange was located on Bradshaw Tce next to Casuarina Square and provided direct access into the shopping centre through a carpark link.

In 2022, fences were put up on Casuarina Interchange between the road and the platform to improve safety.

In May 2025, the CLP government announced its plans to close the Casuarina and Darwin bus interchanges as part of the NT bus safety reform strategy, which closed on 27 October 2025. The interchange was fenced off with the stops on the kurbside of Bradshaw Tce still in use for routes 3, 4, 5, 9, 10, 11, 12, 21, OL1 and OL2. All other routes were moved to the new bus stop on Trower Rd.

== Services ==
Casuarina Interchange stops are served by Darwinbus services.

Service	Destination	Notes
Bradshaw Tce Bay A
4	Darwin Harry Chan Ave	via Charles Darwin University, Nightcliff, Fannie Bay
5	Darwin Harry Chan Ave	via Moil, Marrara, Berrimah, Winnellie
21	Darwin Harry Chan Ave	Express
Bradshaw Tce Bay B
10	Darwin Harry Chan Ave	via Trower Road, Bagot Road
OL2	Darwin Harry Chan Ave	via Nightcliff, Limited Stops
Bradshaw Tce Bay C
9	Palmerston Interchange	via Karama, Berrimah, Pinelands
12	Casuarina Loop	via Malak, Karama
OL1	Palmerston Interchange	via Karama, Limited Stops
Bradshaw Tce Bay D
3	Casuarina Loop	via Jingili, Airport, Moil, Anula
11	Casuarina Loop	via Millner, Nightcliff, Alawa
Trower Rd Bay A
2	Casuarina Loop	via Wanguri, Leanyer, Wulagi, Wagaman
24	Casuarina Loop	via Wanguri, Lyons, Muirhead
Trower Rd Bay B
1	Casuarina Loop	via Hospital, Tiwi, Brinkin, Nakara
1h	Casuarina Loop	via Hospital, Tiwi, Limited Stops
Scaturchio St
	All Services Towards Bradshaw Tce
