= Darwinbus =

Public bus network in Darwin, Australia

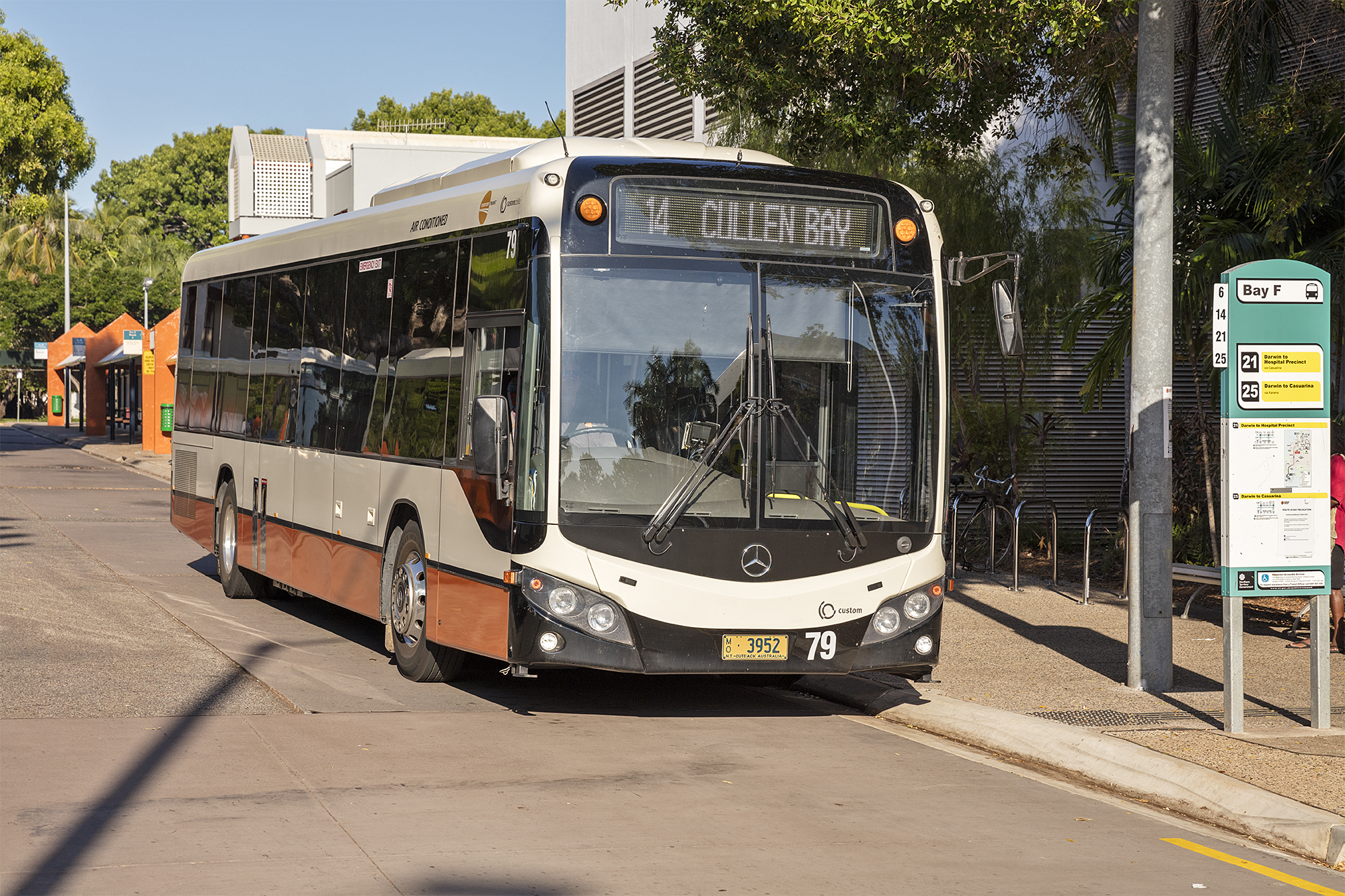
- Territory Transit Custom Coaches bodied Mercedes-Benz OC500LE in June 2016
- Parent: Northern Territory Government
- Founded: 1978
- Headquarters: Berrimah
- Service area: Darwin, Casuarina, Palmerston and Rural Areas
- Service type: Public Transport
- Routes: 39
- Hubs: Darwin CBD, Casuarina, Palmerston
- Depots: 3
- Fleet: 79
- Operator: CDC Northern Territory
- Website: www.transport.nt.gov.au/public/bus/darwin

Darwinbus is the official operational name of the public bus network which operates within the Greater Darwin region, this includes the satellite cities Palmerston and Casuarina, in addition to the Darwin Rural Area in the Northern Territory. The network is exclusively operated by CDC Northern Territory under a six-year contract with the Northern Territory Government starting from 1 July 2022, and in the financial year prior to the COVID-19 pandemic, carried approximately 3.5 million passengers, equivalent to a 5-6% mode share. Prior to July 2022, the network was operated by two contractors; CDC Northern Territory (previously known as Buslink), and Territory Transit who had shared operation of the majority of urban bus services.

Services formerly operated by Territory Transit had been run by the government-owned Darwin Bus Service ("DBS") until October 2014, who had provided about 40% of all services in the Darwin region since Buslink commenced operation during the 1980s. In December 2013, it was announced that Darwin Bus Service services would be privatised. In July 2014, Transit Systems (owner of Territory Transit) was announced as the successful tenderer. In October 2014, Territory Transit took over the former Darwin Bus Service bus operation.

In May 2022, CDC Northern Territory was announced as the successful bidder after a competitive tender process. While both incumbents placed bids for the tender, Australian Transit Group also placed a bid during the tender process.

== Fleet ==
As of December 2013, the Buslink fleet consisted of 164 buses based out of depots in Berrimah and Humpty Doo, and the then Darwin Bus Service fleet based in Stuart Park consisted of 36 buses.

After assuming control of the former Darwin Bus Service depot and its fleet at Stuart Park in 2014, Territory Transit began replacement of many older buses in the fleet. A total of 17 Mercedes-Benz OC500LE rigid buses with Custom Coaches bodywork were added between 2015 and 2020, with the size of the fleet reducing slightly to 34 buses. While these additions largely displaced older rigid buses produced by MAN and Volvo, three of four Scania L94UA articulated buses were ultimately replaced. A further two buses (which included the last articulated bus) were withdrawn without replacement prior to CDC Northern Territory taking control of the Stuart Park Depot in 2022. A pair of Mercedes-Benz OH1830LE buses, which had previously been used by Buslink-Vivo, were also based at Stuart Park depot but were mostly utilised for charter work.

CDC Northern Territory's depots at Berrimah and Humpty Doo had a combined total of 158 buses as of February 2022, although the vast majority of these buses are not utilised for public bus services, instead performing charter, school bus and special needs transport duties. While a total of 47 buses are painted in the Darwinbus livery of black, white and ochre, 6 of those buses were utilised exclusively as school buses. Since commencement of the new contract, some of these buses have been returned to urban service at the Stuart Park depot.

As of December 2022, CDC Northern Territory operates 192 buses in the Greater Darwin area, and an additional 16 in Alice Springs. The increase in Darwin is largely attributable to inheriting the former Territory Transit fleet at Stuart Park, with the combined urban fleets totalling 79 buses. All Darwinbus services are now exclusively operated by Mercedes-Benz OC500LE buses with a mix of Volgren and Custom Coaches bodywork.

CDC Northern Territory has announced plans to introduce nine Volvo Hybrid Buses to the fleet during the present six-year contract, although a timeframe for their introduction has not yet been made public.

== Routes ==
A total of 39 public bus routes are operated by Darwinbus, with the majority operating 7-days per week, excepting Christmas Day and Good Friday. A variety of services are provided, including all-stops and semi-express routes between the three interchanges at Darwin, Casuarina and Palmerston, in addition to feeder or shopper style services which predominantly run in a uni-directional circuit. During Mindil Beach Market Season (last Thursday in April to last Thursday in October), additional bus services run, and some late-night outbound bus services are extended to commence from Mindil Beach to facilitate access to the markets. For other significant events in Darwin, such as New Year's Eve, Darwin Show Day or Bass in the Grass, additional special event buses run.

Timetables and maps are available separately online from the NT Government Website. Service announcements are publicised on the CDC Northern Territory and NT DIPL Facebook pages, in addition to separate pages on the NT Government Website: Public Bus Alerts & Route Changes, and, Proposed Bus Changes.

All bus services inbound to Darwin Interchange utilise Mitchell Street, whereas outbound services travel via Cavenagh Street.

Route	Type	Origin	Destination	Areas Serviced/Notes
OL1	Circular Peak Express	Darwin	Darwin	Operates Monday to Friday peak periods only Clockwise semi-express service, Darwin - Casuarina - Palmerston - Darwin
OL2	Circular Peak Express	Darwin	Darwin	Operates Monday to Friday peak periods only Anti-clockwise semi-express service, Darwin - Palmerston - Casuarina - Darwin
1	Circular	Casuarina	Casuarina	Hospital Precinct, Tiwi, Brinkin, Nakara
1h	Circular/Semi-Express	Casuarina	Casuarina	Operates Monday to Friday only Express to Hospital Precinct, return via Tiwi
2	Circular	Casuarina	Casuarina	Wanguri, Leanyer, Wulagi, Wagaman
3	Circular	Casuarina	Casuarina	Jingili, Moil, Anula, Wulagi, Wagaman
4	Line Haul	Darwin	Casuarina	Darwin CBD, Mindil Beach, Parap, Ludmilla, Coconut Grove, Nightcliff, Rapid Creek, Charles Darwin University (Casuarina), Casuarina
5	Line Haul	Darwin	Casuarina	Operates Monday to Friday only Darwin CBD, Stuart Park, The Narrows, Winnellie, Berrimah, Karama, Malak, Jingili, Moil
6	Circular	Darwin	Darwin	Operates Monday to Friday only Darwin CBD, Museum & Art Gallery NT, Fannie Bay, Parap, Stuart Park
7	Circular	Darwin	Darwin	Operates Monday to Friday only Darwin CBD, Stuart Park, Bayview
8	Line Haul	Darwin	Palmerston	Darwin CBD, Stuart Highway (Stuart Park, The Narrows, Winnellie, Berrimah, Pinelands)
9	Line Haul	Casuarina	Palmerston	Vanderlin Drive (Leanyer, Malak), Karama, Berrimah, Pinelands
10	Line Haul	Darwin	Casuarina	Darwin CBD, Stuart Highway (Stuart Park, The Narrows), Bagot Road (Ludmilla, Rapid Creek), Trower Road (Alawa, Casuarina Square Shopping Centre)
11	Circular	Casuarina	Casuarina	Operates Monday to Friday only Trower Road (Wagaman, Rapid Creek, Nightcliff), Millner, Alawa
12	Circular	Casuarina	Casuarina	Malak, Karama
14	Circular	Darwin	Darwin	Operates either to Cullen Bay Ferry Terminal or to the Waterfront with services to Bayview during the weekend covering parts of route 7.
15	Special Event	Darwin	Darwin	Via Mindil Beach Market, during Mindil Beach Market season only
19	Special Event	Mindil Beach Market	Casuarina	Operates one direction only Observes route 4 from Mindil Beach, operating during Mindil Beach Market Season only
21	Peak Express	Darwin	Hospital Precinct	Operates in the peak direction only AM: Pickup only Hospital Precinct to Casuarina Interchange via Tiwi, Express to Stuart Highway/Woolner Road (Stuart Park), then set-down only to Darwin Interchange via Stuart Highway and Mitchell St PM: Pickup only Darwin Interchange to Stuart Highway/Woolner Road via Cavenagh Street and Stuart Highway, Express to Casuarina, then set-down only to Darwin Hospital Precinct via Tiwi
22	Peak Express	Darwin	Leanyer	Operates in the peak direction only AM: Pickup only from Leanyer Drive/Vanderlin Drive to Airport Hotel/McMillans Road via Leanyer Drive, V.R.D Drive and Lee Point Road, then Express to Stuart Highway/Woolner Road, set-down only to Darwin Interchange via Stuart Highway and Mitchell Street PM: Pickup only from Darwin Interchange to Stuart Highway/Woolner Road via Cavenagh Street and Stuart Highway, Express to Airport Hotel/McMillans Road, set-down only to Leanyer Drive/Vanderlin Drive via Lee Point Road, V.R.D. Drive and Leanyer Drive
24	Circular	Casuarina	Casuarina	Wanguri, Lyons, Muirhead
25	Peak Express	Darwin	Casuarina	Operates in the peak direction only, with AM and PM routes being substantially different AM: Pickup only from Moray Street, Karama to McMillans Road/Airport Hotel, express to Stuart Highway/Berrimah Road, then set-down only to Darwin Interchange via Stuart Highway and Mitchell Street PM: Pickup only from Darwin Interchange to Stuart Highway/Woolner Road via Cavenagh Street and Stuart Highway, express to Moray Street, Karama, then set-down only to Casuarina Interchange. AM route is observed until McMillans Road, then via Lee Point Road, Vanderlin Drive and Trower Road.
28	Peak Express	Darwin	Humpty Doo	Operates in the peak direction only. Some Palmerston circular services and rural routes connect with the 28 at Palmerston Only services Humpty Doo Park and Ride, Coolalinga Park and Ride, Palmerston Interchange and normal Darwin CBD stops before terminating at Darwin Interchange.
70	Circular	Palmerston	Palmerston	Driver, Moulden
71	Circular	Palmerston	Palmerston	Woodroffe, Gray
72	Circular	Palmerston	Palmerston	Gunn, Bakewell, Roseberry
73	Circular	Palmerston	Palmerston	Driver, Durack, Charles Darwin University Durack Campus
74	Lacial	Palmerston	Palmerston	Farrar, Johnston, Zuccoli. Operates a return service via Temple Terrace, Farrar Boulevard / Zuccoli Parade
76	Circular/Semi-Express	Palmerston	Palmerston	Peak-only service operating every 30mins Connects with OL1 & OL2 at Palmerston: Departs 3-5mins after their arrival, and returns about 3mins prior to departure Clockwise circular service with limited stops, via Bakewell, Roseberry, Bellamack, Moulden and Driver. Runs express Palmerston - Bakewell and Driver to Palmerston.
77	Circular	Palmerston	Palmerston	Palmerston Indigenous Village, Roseberry and Bellamack
78	Circular	Palmerston	Palmerston	Weekday only service via Kokoda Industries Yarrawonga
87	Circular	Palmerston	Palmerston	Durack Heights and Durack
88	Circular	Palmerston	Palmerston	Direct service to Palmerston Regional Hospital only
440	Rural Circular	Humpty Doo	Humpty Doo	Operates Monday to Saturday only Operates as "hail and ride" in the rural area Combines parts of 445 & 446, while linking Humpty Doo, Coolalinga and Palmerston.
445	Rural	Palmerston	Humpty Doo	Operates Monday to Saturday only Operates as "hail and ride" in the rural area Via Stuart Highway to Cox Peninsula Road 'Interchange', then return to Humpty Doo Park and Ride via Elizabeth Valley Road, and Redcliffe/Freds Pass Roads
446	Rural	Palmerston	Bees Creek	Operates Monday to Saturday only Operates as "hail and ride" in the rural area Virginia and Bees Creek, terminating at Gulnare Road/Stuart Highway
447	Rural	Palmerston	Humpty Doo	Operates Monday to Saturday only Operates as "hail and ride" in the rural area Howard Springs, McMinns Lagoon, Humpty Doo. Terminates Humpty Doo Park and Ride
450	Rural	Palmerston	Humpty Doo	Operates Monday to Saturday only Operates as "hail and ride" in the rural area Howard Springs, McMinns Lagoon, Girraween, Humpty Doo. Terminates Humpty Doo Park and Ride
