= Burillo =

Burillo is a surname. Notable people with the surname include:

- Irene Burillo Escorihuela (born 1997), Spanish tennis player
- Jordi Burillo (born 1972), Spanish tennis player
- Ricardo Burillo (1891–1939), Spanish military officer
