= Kalmar länstrafik =

Kalmar Länstrafik

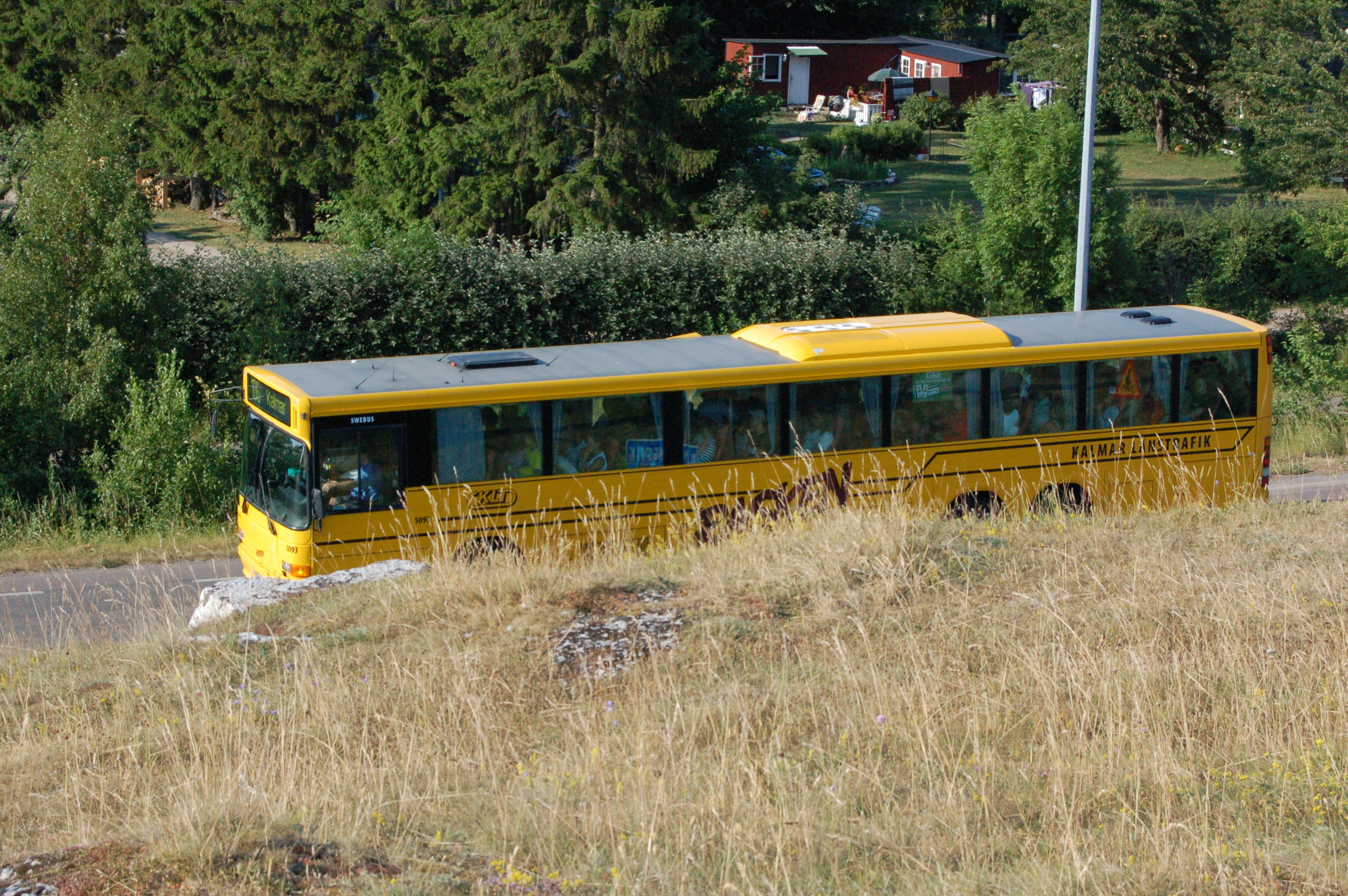
- Company type: Government-owned and controlled corporation
- Number of employees: 96 - Februari 2018

Kalmar Länstrafik is the regional public transport authority of Kalmar Län, Sweden. This means that the KLT is responsible for planning, operating and developing the public transport of the region. Kalmar Länstrafik makes decisions about public transport through a transport supply programme. Decisions on public service obligations are also taken by the region and provide traffic on important routes.

== History ==
The KLT was founded in 1980, then working as a LTD, or aktiebolag (under the name of Kalmar Länstrafik AB). It was owned 50% by the Municipalities of the county and 50% by the Landsting. In 2012, it was reconstituted into a governance of Region Kalmar Län. Kalmar Länstrafik changed its logo as of 1 January 2019 in connection with the formation of the new Kalmar Länsregionen.

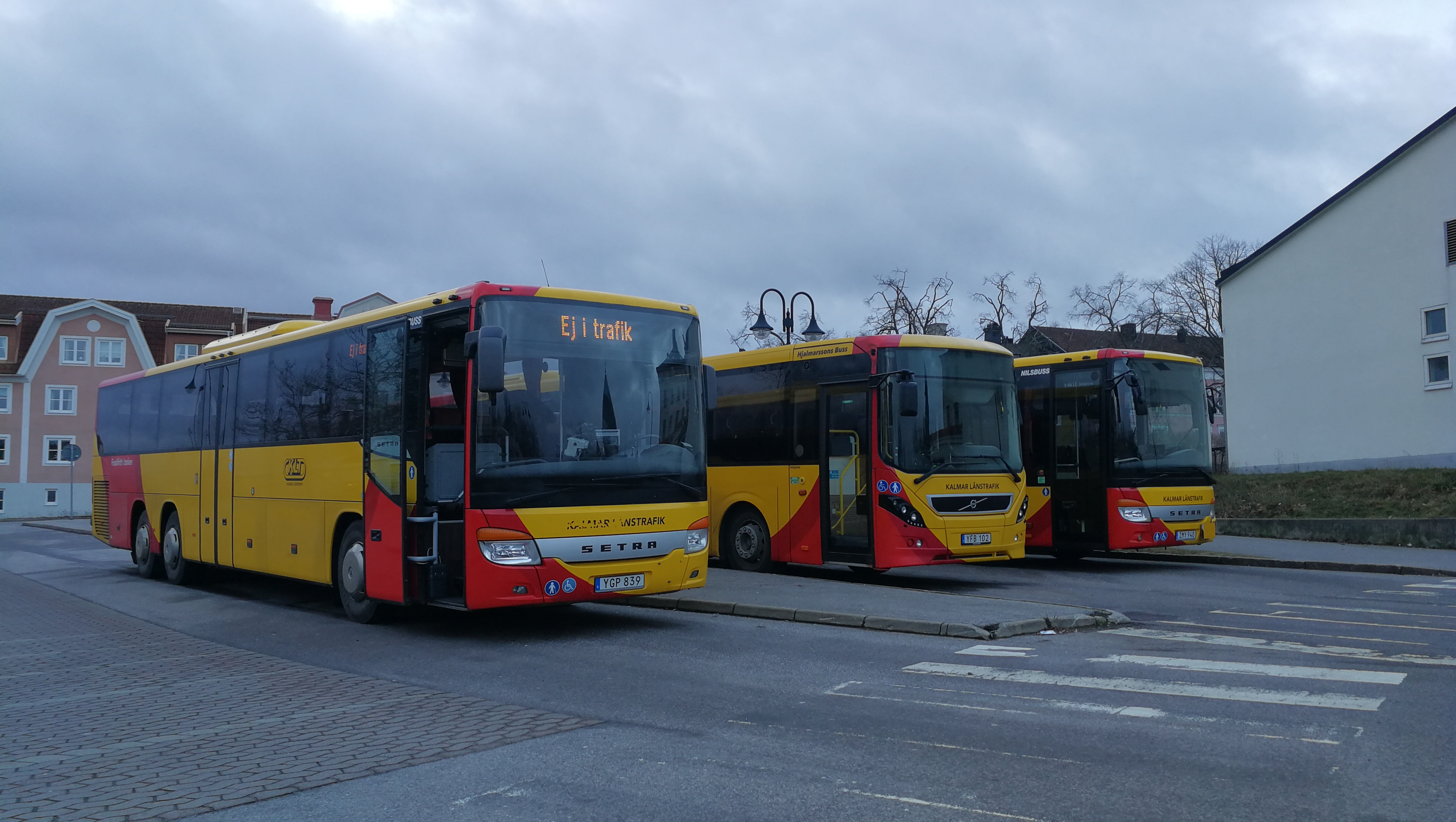
KLT buses at Västervik travelling centre.

== Buses ==
From August 2017, Scania buses began being used in rural traffic and Setra buses on Öland. School and city services in Västervik and Oskarshamn are operated with Scania buses. In Kalmar city traffic Mercedes-Benz buses are used. Scania Mercedes-Benz & Setra for school transport in southern Kalmar Län.
