= List of Marist Brothers schools =

This is a list of schools at all levels founded by the Marist Brothers.

The Marist Brothers is a religious institute founded by St. Marcellin Champagnat, with more than 3,500 Catholic Brothers dedicated "to make Jesus Christ known and loved through the education of young people, especially those most neglected".

Name	Founded	City	Country	Academic level	Notes
Aquinas College, Adelaide	1950	North Adelaide, South Australia	Australia		Tertiary (University) residential college
Archbishop Molloy High School	1892	Briarwood, New York	US	High School	Formerly St. Ann's, renamed Archbishop Molloy in 1957
Assumption College	1893	Kilmore, Victoria	Australia	Middle School	
Bishop Donahue Memorial High School	1955	McMechen, West Virginia	US	High School	
Marist College of Our Lady of Lourdes	1903	Byblos, Amsheet	Lebanon	Elementary and Middle School	
Bunbury Catholic College	1897: St Josephs; 1954: St Francis Xavier; 1973: Amalgamation	Bunbury, Western Australia	Australia	High School	Formed by merger of St. Francis Xaviers College (Marist Brothers) for boys and St Josephs College (Mercy Sisters) for girls. The college now caters for boys and girls, Years 8 to 12 on the site of the old Marist Brothers College (St Francis Xavier).
Campion College	1960	Gisborne	New Zealand	Middle School	
Catholic College Sale	1979	Sale, Victoria	Australia	High School	Formed by merger of St. Patrick's College for Year 7 to Year 12 boys and Our Lady of Sion College for Year 7 to Year 12 girls
Catholic High School	1958	Malacca City	Malaysia	High School	
Catholic High School	1956	Petaling Jaya	Malaysia	High School	
Central Catholic High School	1935	Lawrence, Massachusetts	US	High School	
Marist School	1901	Atlanta, Georgia	US	High School	
Centro Universitario Franco Mexicano de Monterrey (CUFM)	1958	Monterrey, Nuevo León	Mexico	Middle and High School	Third Marist school in Monterrey
Champagnat Catholic College Pagewood	1960	Pagewood, New South Wales	Australia	Middle School	
Champagnat Institute		Suva	Fiji		
Champagnat School	1915	Buenos Aires City	Argentina	Kindergarten, Primary, Secondary and Tertiary School	
Christopher Columbus High School	1959	Miami, Florida	US	High school	It was selected, for the fourth time in a row, as one of the "Top 50 Catholic High Schools" in the United States by the Catholic High School Honor Roll in 2008.
Colegio Cervantes	1937	Guadalajara, Jalisco	Mexico	Primary and High school	
Colegio Champagnat (Villa Alemana)	1967	Villa Alemana	Chile	Primary and Secondary	
Colegio Champagnat Bogotá	1937	Bogotá	Colombia	Primary and secondary	
Colegio Hidalgo	1908	Cocula, Jalisco	México	Preescolar, primaria y Secundaria	En sus inicios se llamó Colegio de la Purísima. Cerró en 1914 por la revolución. Abrió de nuevo en 1924 y cerró en 1926 por la Guerra Cristera. En 1937 abrió de nuevo y cambió al nombre actual.
Collège des Frères Maristes Champville	1966	Northern Metn	Lebanon	Kindergarten	
Colegio Franco Mexicano	1925	Monterrey, Nuevo León	Mexico	Kindergarten and Elementary School	First Marist school in Monterrey
Colegio Marcelino Champagnat	1983	La Pintana	Chile	Elementary and Middle School	
Colegio Marista	1960s	Alajuela	Costa Rica	Elementary and Middle School	Also houses a support program for youths with special needs
Colégio Marista Arquidiocesano		São Paulo	Brazil		
Colégio Marista Champagnat		Porto Alegre	Brazil		
Colégio Santista (Marista de Santos)	1904	Santos	Brazil	Kindergarten, Elementary and High School	Was a boy-only school until 1970. Changed name to "Colégio Marista de Santos" in 2004 at its 100th anniversary. Closed in 2008, as it was incorporated to the municipal school system in 2009.
Colégio Marista de Brasília	1962	Brasília	Brazil	Kindergarten, Elementary and High School	
Colégio Marista Nossa Senhora de Nazaré	1930	Belém	Brazil	Kindergarten, Elementary and High School	
Colégio Marista de Carcavelos	1965	Lisbon	Portugal	Kindergarten, Elementary, Middle and High School	
Colegio Marista El Salvador	1967	Manatí, Puerto Rico	US		
Colegio Marista Guaynabo	1963	Guaynabo, Puerto Rico	US		
Colegio Marista Hermano Fernando	2007	Alto Hospicio	Chile	Elementary School	
Colégio Marista Nossa Senhora da Gloria		São Paulo	Brazil		
Colegio Marista Pio XII	1958	Ponta Grossa, Parana	Brazil	Kindergarten, Elementary and Middle School	
Colegio Marista San José	1951	León	Spain	Elementary and High School	
Colegio Marista San Vicente de Paúl	1952	David, Chiriquí	Panama	Kindergarten, Elementary, Middle and High School	Closed 1996. School founded in 1952 by Brothers of Charity (St. Vincent de Paul), then taken by Marists Brothers (1969), and now under the Agustines OSA since 1997.
Colegio Morelos de Tepatitlán	1932	Tepatitlán de Morelos, Jalisco	Mexico	Elementary and High School	
Colégio Marista São Luís	1924	Recife, Pernambuco	Brazil	Kindergarten, Elementary, Middle and High School	
Colegio Nuestra Señora de Andacollo	1998	La Serena	Chile	Elementary, Middle and Technical School	
Colegio San José del Parque	1967	Madrid	Spain	Elementary and High School	
Colegio San José Maristas del Callao	1909	Lima	Peru	Elementary and High School	
Col·legi Sagrat Cor	1887	Mataró, Barcelona	Spain	Kindergarten, Elementary and High School	Closed 1972. Aka Col·legi Sant Josep (related to the street's name where it was located)
Maristas Colegio Sagrado Corazón Valencia	1897	Valencia	Spain	Kindergarten, Elementary and Middle School	
Collège Laval	1854	Laval, Quebec	Canada	High school	
Externato Marista de Lisboa	1947	Lisbon	Portugal	Kindergarten, Elementary, Middle School and High School	
Good Counsel College	1975	Innisfail, Queensland	Australia	Middle School	Was formed by a merger of the Sacred Heart Girls' School and Good Counsel Boys' School.
Hato Petera College	1928	Auckland	New Zealand	Middle School	
Holy Cross College	1880	Kalutara	Sri Lanka	Primary and secondary	
Institut Bobandana	1948	South Kivu	Dem. Rep. of Congo	Middle School	
Institut Technique Fundi Maendeleo (ETPO/ITFM)	1950	Bukavu	Dem. Rep. of Congo	Technical School	
Institut Weza de Nyangezi	1948	Bukavu	Dem. Rep. of Congo	Middle School	
Institute of the Marist Brothers		Toulon	France		
Instituto Alonso de Ercilla	1929	Santiago	Chile	Primary and secondary	
Instituto Chacabuco	1911	Los Andes	Chile	Primary and secondary	
Instituto Juan XXIII	1963	Punto Fijo	Venezuela	Elementary, Middle School and High School	
Instituto Franco Mexicano, A.C. (IFM)	1950	Monterrey, Nuevo León	Mexico	Kindergarten and Elementary school	Second Marist school in Monterrey
Instituto Liceal Dom Gonçalo da Silveira	1948	Beira, Sofala	Mozambique		Closed during Civil War. Now the headquarters of the Faculty of Medicine - Universidade Católica de Moçambique
Instituto México de Baja California	1965	Tijuana, Baja California	Mexico	Kindergarten, Elementary, Middle School and High School	
Instituto O'Higgins	1915	Rancagua	Chile	Primary and secondary	
Instituto Potosino Marista	1935	San Luis Potosí, San Luis Potosí	Mexico	Primary and secondary	
Instituto San Fernando	1931	San Fernando	Chile	Primary and secondary	
Instituto San Martín Curicó	1912	Curico	Chile	Primary and secondary	
Instituto Rafael Ariztía	1914	Quillota	Chile	Elementary and Middle School	
Instituto Maristas Valladolid	1941	Morelia, Michoacán	Mexico	Kindergarten, Elementary, Middle, High School and College	
Istituto Champagnat, Genoa	1905	Genoa	Italy	Elementary, Middle and Technical School	
Istituto Fratelli Maristi	1935/2010	Giugliano	Italy	High School	
Istituto San Leone Magno	1887	Rome	Italy	Kindergarten, Elementary and Middle School	
Istituto Principe Umberto	1935	Giugliano	Italy	Elementary School	
LaValla School	1998	Phnom Penh	Cambodia	Elementary School	The LaValla School was established by the Marist Brothers in 1998. It is the only government approved school providing a full primary education to children with physical disabilities. Extended learning programs are provided in addition to the approved and accelerated curriculum. These include Traditional Khmer Music, English, Elementary Computing, Physical and Hydro-therapy, Sewing and Guitar.
es:Liceo Guatemala		Guatemala City	Guatemala	Kindergarten, Elementary and Middle School	
Liceo Salvadoreño		San Salvador	El Salvador		
Lycée Léonin	1838	Athens	Greece		
Marcellin College	1958	Auckland	New Zealand	Middle School	
Marcellin College	1950	Bulleen, Victoria	Australia	Middle School	Original campus in Camberwell, Victoria. Dual campuses from 1963 to 1993.
Marcellin College Randwick	1923	Randwick, New South Wales	Australia	Middle School	
Marian College	1954	Dublin	Ireland		
Maris Stella College	1922	Negombo	Sri Lanka	Primary and secondary	
Maris Stella High School	1958		Singapore	Primary and Secondary	
Marist Brothers Dete	1972	Dete, Hwange District	Zimbabwe	Middle School	Founded in 1972 as a transfer from St. Mary's Secondary School in Lukosi, Hwange. St Mary's was an old Catholic school run by the priests of the Hwange Diocese.
Marist Brothers High School		Suva	Fiji		
Marist Brothers International School	1951	Suma-ku, Kobe	Japan	Kindergarten, Elementary and Middle School	MBIS was founded in 1951 by Brother Charles Fojoucyk and Brother Stephen Weber. They had been forced to leave St. Louis International School in Tientsin, China, because of pressure from communist authorities.
Kumamoto Marist School	1961	Kumamoto	Japan	Middle School	Founded in 1961 by Brother Patrick Tyrrell.
Marist Brothers Juniorate		San Salvador	El Salvador		
Marist Brothers' Juniorate		Uturu, Abia State	Nigeria	Middle School	
Marist Brothers Linmeyer	1966	Linmeyer, Johannesburg	South Africa	Elementary and High School	
Marist Brothers Primary School		Suva	Fiji	Elementary School	
Marist High School	1968	Eugene, Oregon	US	High School	
Marist College	1928	Auckland	New Zealand	High School	
Marist College	1884	Athlone	Ireland	Middle School	Notable past pupils include John McCormack and Brian Lenihan.
Marist College	1925	Kingston upon Hull, East Riding of Yorkshire	England	Middle School	Closed 1988
Marist College	1905	Poughkeepsie, New York	US	College	While still retaining some Marist brothers in the faculty, it is no longer officially a Catholic college.
Marist College Ashgrove	1940	Brisbane - Ashgrove, Queensland	Australia	Elementary and Middle School	
Marist College Canberra	1968	Pearce, Australian Capital Territory	Australia	Elementary and Middle School	Foundation in Sydney in 1875 at the Rocks, St Mary's Cathedral and Darlinghurst before relocation to Canberra in 1968.
Marist College Bendigo	2015	Bendigo, Victoria	Australia		By 2021, to be primary and secondary school. Catholic College Bendigo a co-education secondary school was formed in 1983 governed together by the Sisters of Mercy, amalgamating St Mary’s College, and the Marist Brothers, amalgamating Marist Brothers' College, until 2012.
Marist College Eastwood	1937	Eastwood, New South Wales	Australia	Middle School	
Marist College Kogarah	1909	Kogarah, New South Wales	Australia	Middle School	
Marist Catholic College North Shore	1888	North Sydney, New South Wales	Australia	Elementary and Middle School	in 2021, combined with local primary school St Mary's Primary School to form a K-12 educational precinct. Managed and operated by Sydney Catholic Schools.
Marist College Penshurst		Mortdale, New South Wales	Australia		
Marist College Rosalie (Sacred Heart College)	1929 - 2008	Brisbane - Rosalie, Queensland Paddington, Queensland	Australia		
Marist Comprehensive Academy		Uturu, Abia State	Nigeria	Middle School	
Marist Comprehensive College	2000	Nteje, Anambra State	Nigeria	Middle School	Br. Ifeanyi Mbaegbu, FMS (inaugural principal; served from 2000-2006). The school is one of the best in Anambra State.
Marist High School	1963	Chicago, Illinois	US	High school	
Marist High School	1954	Bayonne, New Jersey	US	High school	
Marist Regional College	1972	Burnie, Tasmania	Australia		Founded by merger of Stella Maris Regional College and Marist College (Burnie)
Marist School - Marikina	1964	Marikina	Philippines	High school	Founded by Br. Bernard Curtin, F.M.S.
Marist-Sion College	1951	Warragul, Victoria	Australia	Middle School	Formed by merger of St. Josephs & Our Lady of Sion Colleges
Maristes Valldemia	1855	Mataró, Barcelona	Spain	Kindergarten, Elementary and high school	Founded 1855 by three former Piarists related persons. Marists took over in 1888.
Mount Saint Michael Academy	1926	Bronx, New York	US		
Moyle Park College	1957	Clondalkin	Ireland		
Mt Carmel High School	1986	Varroville, New South Wales	Australia	Middle School	Founded in 1986 by Brother Clarence Cunningham
Mt Maria College	Brisbane - Enoggera: 1970, Mitchelton: 1978, amalgamated: 2006	Enoggera, Queensland and Mitchelton, Queensland	Australia	Middle School	Founded on two separate sites, then become one college in 2006
Mt Maria College Petrie	1987	Petrie, Queensland	Australia	Middle School	
Mtendere Secondary School Thiwi	1949	Dedza District	Malawi		
Newman College		Floreat, Western Australia; Churchlands, Western Australia	Australia	Elementary and Middle School	Three campuses
Notre Dame of Cotabato	1946	Cotabato City	Philippines	Middle School	First Marist school in the Philippines
Notre Dame of Dadiangas University and Notre Dame of Dadiangas University – Integrated Basic Education Department	1953	General Santos	Philippines	Elementary, Middle and Tertiary School	Alma mater of Manny Pacquiao
Notre Dame of Jolo College		Jolo, Sulu	Philippines	Elementary, Middle and Tertiary School	
Notre Dame of Kidapawan College		Kidapawan City	Philippines	Elementary, Middle and Tertiary School	
Notre Dame of Marbel University	1952	Koronadal City	Philippines	Elementary, Middle and Tertiary School	The First Marist University in the Philippines.
Nyanga High School	1962	Nyanga	Zimbabwe	High school	Founded in 1962 by Marist Brothers in 1962 after establishing a mission at Kutama
Our Lady and St. Chad Sports College	1928	Wolverhampton, West Midlands	UK	Middle School	The original school founded in 1928 was a boy's grammar school called St. Chad's College. In 1978 it amalgamated with its 'sister' school for girls and became Our Lady and St. Chad Comprehensive School. It was later renamed Our Lady and St. Chad Catholic Sports College.
Our Lady of Lourdes High School	1958	Poughkeepsie, New York	US	High school	
Our Lady of the Sacred Heart Catholic College	1938	Alice Springs, Northern Territory	Australia		
Parramatta Marist High School	1820	Westmead, New South Wales	Australia		The oldest and most computered Marist school
Red Bend Catholic College	1926	Forbes, New South Wales	Australia	Middle School	
Roselle Catholic High School	1959	Roselle, New Jersey	US	High school	
Sacred Heart College	1903	Auckland	New Zealand	Middle School	
Sacred Heart College	1897	Somerton Park, South Australia	Australia	College	
Sacred Heart College, Johannesburg	1889	Observatory, Gauteng	South Africa	College	
Saint Joseph Academy	1865	Brownsville, Texas	US		
Saint Joseph Regional	1962	Montvale, NJ	US	High School	Saint Joseph Regional High School (SJR) was founded in September 1962. The first graduating class was in June 1966. The school was initially administered by the Xaverian Brothers until 1997, and the Marist Brothers affiliation began in 2000.
Samaritan Catholic College	2000	Preston, Victoria	Australia	Middle School	Formed by merger of St. Joseph's College and Redden Catholic College
SMJK Sam Tet	1934	Ipoh	Malaysia	High school	
St Augustines College		Cairns, Queensland	Australia		
St. Agnes Boys High School	1914	New York City	US	High school	
St Bernard's College	1946	Lower Hutt	New Zealand	Middle School	
St David's Marist Inanda	1941	Inanda, Gauteng	South Africa	High School	
St. Francis Xavier's College	1955	Tai Kok Tsui	Hong Kong	Middle School	
St Francis Xavier's Kutama College	1939	Norton	Zimbabwe	Middle School	Founded in 1913 by Jesuit priests and transferred to the Marist Brothers in 1939
St. Francis Xavier's School	1963	Tsuen Wan	Hong Kong	Middle School	
St Gregory's College, Campbelltown	1926	Campbelltown, New South Wales	Australia	Middle School	
St. Henry's Marist Brothers' College	1929	Durban	South Africa	Kindergarten, Elementary and High School	
St John's College	1960	Hamilton	New Zealand	Middle School	
St. John's National School	1898	Sligo	Ireland	Elementary School	Boys only school running from second class to sixth class
St John's RC High School	1931	Dundee	Scotland	Middle School	
St. Joseph's College, Alafua	1912	Alafua	Samoa	Middle School	
St. Joseph's College	1875	Dumfries	Scotland	Middle School	Founded in 1875 as a boys only school. Female pupils became part of the school in the early 1970s, with the school becoming part of the state school system in 1981.
St. Joseph's College, East Brunswick / North Fitzroy	1930	Brunswick East / Fitzroy North, Victoria	Australia		Amalgamated with Samaritan College, Preston in 1998
St. Joseph's College, Hunters Hill	1881	Hunters Hill, New South Wales	Australia		
St. Joseph's Boys' College, Nugegoda	1953	Nugegoda, Colombo	Sri Lanka	Primary and secondary	
St. Joseph's Juniorate	1924	Tyngsborough, Massachusetts	US	Seminary	Sold to the Wang Institute of Graduate Studies in 1977
St. Joseph’s Marist College	1918	Rondebosch, Cape Town	South Africa	Elementary and Middle School	
St. Mary's Catholic College Casino	1946	Casino, New South Wales	Australia	Middle School	First university examinations were sat by students in the parish of St Mary's in 1890. Marist Brothers laid the foundation stone for the college in 1917 but the school was run by the Mercy Sisters until 1946 when the brothers finally arrived, establishing the Brothers School. The schools (Marist and Mercy) amalgamated in 1975 to form St Mary's High School. Its name changed to St Mary's Catholic College in 2010.
St. Mungo's Academy	1858	Glasgow	Scotland		
St Paul's College	1955	Auckland	New Zealand	Middle School	
St Patrick's Marist College	1872	Dundas, New South Wales	Australia	Middle School	Oldest school under the teaching of Marist Brothers in Australia
Trinity Catholic College, Auburn	1995	Regents Park, New South Wales; Auburn, New South Wales	Australia	Middle School	Two campuses. Formed by the merger of Benedict College (Auburn), St John's Girls' High (Auburn), and St Peter Chanel Girls' High.
Trinity Catholic College, Beenleigh	1982	Beenleigh, Queensland	Australia	Middle School	
Trinity Catholic College	1886	Lismore, New South Wales	Australia	Middle School	
Unidad Educativa Colegio Champagnat		Caracas	Venezuela		
Unidad Educativa Colegio Nuestra Señora De Chiquinquira H.H. Maristas	1925	Maracaibo	Venezuela	Elementary and Middle School	First Marist school in Venezuela
Universidad Marista Guadalajara	1989	Guadalajara, Jalisco	Mexico	University	Founded in 1989 as Universidad La Salle Guadalajara. In August 1997, due to immense growth, it moved to another site, where it stayed until 2003, when it moved to its current site.
St Albert's Comprehensive College Bafut]	2005	Bafut, Northwest Region	Cameroon	Secondary and High School	Founded in 2005 by the Marist Brothers. With a maximum capacity of 1020 students. Br Francis Lukong, FMS (inaugural principal; served from 2005-2012)
St. Pius X Catholic College Tatum]	1965	Tatum, Northwest Region	Cameroon	Secondary, High School and Teachers Training College	The First Marist Brothers School in Cameroon. In 2025 the Marist brothers celebrated more than 60 years of their presence in Cameroon. The school has a capacity of about 300 students.
St. Joseph's Catholic Comprehensive College, Mbengwi]	1999	Mbengwi, Northwest Region	Cameroon	Secondary and High School	In 2024 the school celebrated its silver jubilee ( 25years). The school has a capacity of about 600 students. Br Francis Lukong, FMS (inaugural principal; served from 1999-2005)
Marist Bilingual Comprehensive College babenga]	2022	Babenga-Bonaberi, Littoral Region	Cameroon	Nursury, Primary Secondary and High School	Br Ivo Ivo Njongai Leynyuy, FMS (inaugural principal)
Colegio Montejo	1930	Mérida, Yucatán	México	Elementary School	Founded by the Marist Brothers in 1930, it used to work as elementary and middle school, but in 1960 it also added high school to it services. Due to increased demand, in 1971 "Centro Universitario Montejo" was created to receive the middle and high school students, so "Colegio Montejo" ended as an Elementary School only.
Centro Universitario Montejo	1971	Mérida, Yucatán	México	Middle and High School	
