= List of Homeland Learning Centres =

List of educational facilities in very remote Northern Territory communities

Homeland Learning Centres (HLCs) are primary and secondary educational facilities in the Northern Territory (Australia) on Indigenous Australian land at remote locations known as "outstations" or "homelands". The number of HLCs operating each year may vary because of population fluctuations and families moving between homelands. As of 2023, there were 31 HLCs in the Northern Territory. More than 90 homelands have had HLCs in the past, three of which were operated by the Catholic Education Office. The following is a list of current and former HLCs, together with other reported homeland education sites that have not been upgraded into schools:

List of Homeland Learning Centres
Name ^{†}	Coordinates	Hub school ^{‡}	Opened	Refs
Ankabadbirri	12°15′25″S 134°25′10″E	Maningrida College		
Arawerr	22°0′44″S 134°50′47″E	Arlparra School		
Atneltyey	22°2′13″S 134°36′46″E	Utopia School		
Atnwengerrp	21°52′11″S 134°59′37″E	Ampilatwatja School	2003	
Badawarrka	14°41′47″S 134°26′40″E	Ngukurr School		
Bauhinia Downs	16°12′45″S 135°28′26″E	Borroloola School		
Bayagida	12°2′33″S 134°55′41″E	Milingimbi School		
Birany Birany	12°49′0″S 136°28′36″E	Yirrkala School	1976	
Bodia	12°4′38″S 134°53′47″E	Milingimbi School		
Bolkdjam	12°24′39″S 134°25′11″E	Maningrida College		
Buluhkaduru	12°25′59″S 134°25′26″E	Maningrida College		
Clinic	21°53′52″S 134°50′29″E	Arlparra School		
Corella Creek	18°22′2″S 135°51′29″E	Tennant Creek Primary School		
Djurranalpi	11°50′47″S 135°52′23″E	Shepherdson College		
Dhalinybuy	12°24′43″S 136°23′16″E	Yirrkala School	1976	
Dhuruputjpi	13°3′16″S 136°10′36″E	Yirrkala School		
Donydji	12°53′27″S 135°28′12″E	Shepherdson College	2001	
Buthuŋura				
Gama-Guyurra	12°3′36″S 134°45′47″E	Milingimbi School		
Gamardi	12°16′26″S 134°40′57″E	Maningrida College	1992	
Ramingirr		Gapuwiyak School		
Gan Gan	13°2′46″S 135°56′35″E	Yirrkala School	1974	
Garrthalala	12°45′46″S 136°34′9″E	Yirrkala School	1974	
Gatji	12°16′24″S 134°49′12″E	Ramingining School		
Gumarrirnbang	12°19′47″S 133°59′49″E	Gunbalanya School		
Gurrumuru	12°35′29″S 136°13′51″E	Yirrkala School	1975	
Gutjangan	12°5′2″S 136°48′31″E	Yirrkala School		
Indaringinya	21°40′42″S 134°43′13″E	Utopia School		
Irrirlerre	22°50′46″S 135°8′4″E	Harts Range School		
Irrultja	21°58′47″S 135°6′43″E	Arlparra School		
Ji-Malawa	12°7′19″S 134°40′23″E	Maningrida College	1991	
Ji-Marda	12°3′22″S 134°36′54″E	Maningrida College		
Gochan Jiny-Jirra	12°11′57″S 134°27′27″E	Maningrida College	1998	
Kolorbidahdah	12°36′46″S 134°19′26″E	Maningrida College		
Kudjekbinj	12°15′5″S 133°48′6″E	Gunbalanya School		
Kulpitharra	23°44′25″S 132°0′13″E	Ntaria School		
Kuy	14°2′7″S 129°35′52″E	Our Lady of the Sacred Heart Thamarrurr Catholic College		
Langarra	12°5′56″S 135°21′37″E	Milingimbi School		
Malnjangarnak	12°39′37″S 134°46′24″E	Maningrida College		
Mankorlod	12°33′54″S 134°16′14″E	Maningrida College		
Marrkolidjban	12°14′17″S 134°3′51″E	Maningrida College		
Matamata	12°4′35″S 136°16′12″E	Shepherdson College		
Merrepen	14°13′15″S 129°58′1″E	Peppimenarti School		
Mirrngatja	12°39′28″S 135°11′37″E	Shepherdson College	1982	
Mooronga	11°55′14″S 135°4′34″E	Milingimbi School		
Mumeka	12°21′47″S 134°8′7″E	Maningrida College		
Mungkarta	20°20′14″S 134°11′54″E	Tennant Creek Primary School		
Murrunga		Milingimbi School		
Namugardabu	12°9′26″S 134°1′30″E	Gunbalanya School		
Nemarluk	14°14′28″S 130°0′10″E	Peppimenarti School		
Nulawan	14°47′15″S 134°55′52″E	Ngukurr School		
Pulardi	22°33′45″S 132°22′47″E	Mount Allan School		
Pungalindum School	22°4′12″S 134°41′24″E	Arlparra School		
Red Sandhill	24°0′37″S 132°51′18″E	Ntaria School		
Raymangirr	12°20′24″S 136°0′11″E	Gapuwiyak School		
Rorruwuy	12°12′9″S 136°17′42″E	Laynhapuy Homelands School		
Ruwakpuy	12°7′0″S 136°49′0″E	Laynhapuy Homelands School	1990	
Rurrangala	12°54′14″S 136°15′14″E	Laynhapuy Homelands School		
Tjoungouri	16°10′14″S 136°2′35″E	Borroloola School		
Ukaka	24°35′34″S 132°22′28″E	Imanpa School	early 1990s	
Wandangula	16°3′17″S 136°20′43″E	Borroloola School		
Wandawuy	12°53′30″S 136°21′18″E	Laynhapuy Homelands School	1975	
Wayililinypa	22°30′8″S 131°26′50″E	Yuendumu School	1987	
Wudikapildiyerr	13°51′33″S 130°0′8″E	St Francis Xavier Catholic School	2001	
Wurdeja	12°10′12″S 134°39′40″E	Maningrida College	1990	
Yilan	12°2′33″S 134°37′17″E	Maningrida College		
Yalukun	12°15′49″S 136°0′25″E	Gapuwiyak School		
Yikkarrakal	12°30′13″S 134°6′41″E	Maningrida College		
Wurankuwu	11°37′2″S 130°16′39″E	Xavier Catholic College		

† - Many Indigenous communities have more than one name, each of which may have multiple spellings.
‡ - The school which manages the Homeland Learning Centre.

== Ceremony-site education services ==
Maningrida College also provides education services at temporary ceremony sites as part of its homelands education program. These sites are distinct from permanent homeland communities and are not necessarily formally designated Homeland Learning Centres:

Ceremony-site education services
Name ^{†}	Coordinates	Hub school ^{‡}	Opened	Refs
An-Murnabarra A-jirra		Maningrida College		
Gorrong-Gorrong	12°7′22″S 134°29′43″E	Maningrida College		

== Upgraded Homeland Learning Centres ==
The number of HLCs has generally declined because of closures and the upgrading of some HLCs to schools, e.g., the 2008 upgrade of Alparra and Baniyala (Yilpara). The following is a non-exhaustive list of former Homeland Learning Centres that have ceased to have that status due to closure or being upgraded to schools:

Homeland Learning Centres upgraded to schools
Name ^{†}	Coordinates	Prior Hub ^{‡}	Opened	Ceased	Outcome	Refs
Atitjere	22°59′3″S 134°56′2″E					
Baniyala	13°12′1″S 136°13′32″E	Yirrkala School	1974	2010	Upgraded to Baniyala Garrangali School	
Banthula	11°50′10″S 135°52′27″E	Shepherdson College	2000	2008	Merged with Gäwa Christian School	
Engawala	22°48′10″S 134°27′18″E	Harts Range School			Upgraded to Alcoota School	
Gawa	11°45′36″S 135°54′21″E	Shepherdson College	1991	2004	Upgraded to Gawa Christian School.	
Mamadawerre	12°15′24″S 133°39′22″E	Nawarddeken Academy		2021	Upgraded to a campus of Nawarddeken Academy	
Mapuru Yirralka College	12°15′9″S 135°26′15″E	Shepherdson College	1982	2010	Upgraded to Mapuru Christian School	
Manmoyi	12°32′25″S 134°6′34″E	Gunbalanya School		2021	Upgraded to a campus of Nawarddeken Academy	
Mulga Bore	22°27′7″S 134°12′42″E	Utopia School		Before 2012	Upgraded to Mulga Bore School.	
Nganambala (Emu Point)	14°10′12″S 130°19′31″E	Peppimenarti School	2005	2011	Upgraded to Nganambala School.	
Orrtipa-Thurra	22°47′4″S 136°10′5″E	Harts Range School			Subsequently became Bonya School.	

== See also ==
Northern Territory

- Homeland Learning Centre
- List of schools in the Northern Territory
- Minister for Education (Northern Territory)

Australia

- Australian Curriculum
- Education in Australia
- Lists of schools in Australia
