= List of schools in the Northern Territory =

This is a list of schools in the Northern Territory of Australia. The Northern Territory education system traditionally consists of primary schools, which accommodate students from transition to Year 6, and high schools, which accommodate students from Years 7 to 12.

== State schools ==
=== State primary schools ===
Name	Suburb/town	LGA	Opened	Ref
Alawa Primary School	Alawa	Darwin	1970	
Alyangula Area School	Alyangula	East Arnhem	1968	
Anula Primary School	Anula	Darwin	1981	
Bakewell Primary School	Bakewell	Palmerston	1999	
Batchelor Area School	Batchelor	Coomalie	1953	
Bees Creek Primary School	Freds Pass	Litchfield	1997	
Berry Springs Primary School	Berry Springs	Litchfield	1977	
Bradshaw Primary School	Gillen	Alice Springs	1974	
Braitling Primary School	Braitling	Alice Springs	1977	
Casuarina Street Primary School	Katherine East	Katherine	1998	
Clyde Fenton Primary School	Katherine	Katherine	1977	
Driver Primary School	Driver	Palmerston	1986	
Durack Primary School	Durack	Palmerston	1998	
Forrest Parade School	Bellamack	Palmerston	2016	
Gillen Primary School	Gillen	Alice Springs	1970	
Girraween Primary School	Girraween	Litchfield	2002	
Gray Primary School	Gray	Palmerston	1983	
Howard Springs Primary School	Howard Springs	Litchfield	1977	
Humpty Doo Primary School	Humpty Doo	Litchfield	1980	
Jabiru Area School	Jabiru	West Arnhem	1981	
Jingili Primary School	Jingili	Darwin	1971	
Karama Primary School	Karama	Darwin	1984	
Katherine South Primary School	Katherine	Katherine	1976	
Larapinta Primary School	Larapinta	Alice Springs	1998	
Larrakeyah Primary School	Larrakeyah	Darwin	1963	
Leanyer Primary School	Leanyer	Darwin	1983	
Ludmilla Primary School	Ludmilla	Darwin	1967	
MacFarlane Primary School	Katherine	Katherine	1987	
Malak Primary School	Malak	Darwin	1981	
Manunda Terrace Primary School	Karama	Darwin	1984	
Millner Primary School	Millner	Darwin	1968	
Moil Primary School	Moil	Darwin	1972	
Moulden Park School	Moulden	Palmerston	1987	
Nakara Primary School	Nakara	Darwin	1975	
Nhulunbuy Primary School	Nhulunbuy	East Arnhem	1972	
Nightcliff Primary School	Nightcliff	Darwin	1961	
Parap Primary School	Parap	Darwin	1958	
Rosebery Primary School	Rosebery	Palmerston	2011	
Ross Park Primary School	East Side	Alice Springs	1961	
Sadadeen Primary School	Sadadeen	Alice Springs	1983	
Stuart Park Primary School	Stuart Park	Darwin	1966	
Tennant Creek Primary School	Tennant Creek	Barkly	1981	
Wanguri Primary School	Wanguri	Darwin	1976	
Woodroffe Primary School	Woodroffe	Palmerston	1996	
Wulagi Primary School	Wulagi	Darwin	1981	
Zuccoli Primary School	Zuccoli	Palmerston	2020	

=== State high schools ===
Name	Suburb	LGA	Opened	Years	Ref
Casuarina Senior College	Moil	Darwin	1973	10–12	
Centralian Middle School	Gillen	Alice Springs	2010	T–12	
Centralian Senior College	Sadadeen	Alice Springs	1979	10–12	
Darwin High School	The Gardens	Darwin	1948	7–12	
Darwin Middle School	The Gardens	Darwin	2008	7–9	
Dripstone Secondary College	Tiwi	Darwin	1981	7–9	
Driver Secondary School	Driver	Palmerston	2026	7–12	
Nightcliff High School	Rapid Creek	Darwin	1972	7–9	
Nhulunbuy High School	Nhulunbuy	East Arnhem	1981	7–12	
Rosebery Secondary School	Rosebery	Palmerston	2026	7–12	
Sanderson High School	Wulagi	Darwin	1976	7–9	
Taminmin College	Humpty Doo	Litchfield	1983	7–9	
Tennant Creek High School	Tennant Creek	Barkly	1986	7–12	

=== Remote schools ===
A significant percentage of the Territory's population is Aboriginal people living in remote areas. Most of these are based in communities, which are like towns but differ in that they are owned and run by the local population. Some communities viewed as sustainable in the long term have been labeled "Territory Growth Towns" by the Territory Government and will attract increased investment to improve services.

Remote Schools
Name	Town	Group/region	Opened	Years	Ref
Adelaide River School	Adelaide River	Top End	1953	T–8	
Alcoota School	Engawala	Sandover		T–8	
Akaye (Mulga Bore) School	Mulga Bore	Central Desert		T–11	
Arlparra School	Utopia	Sandover	2009	6–12	
Atneltyey School	Atneltyey	Barkly			
Alekarenge School	Ali Curung	Barkly	1956	T–11	
Alyarrmandumanja Umbakumba School	Umbakumba (Groote Eylandt Island)	Arnhem	1981	T–12	
Alpurrurulam School	Alpurrurulam	Sandover		T–11	
Amanbidji School	Amanbidji	Katherine		T–9	
Amoonguna School	Amoonguna	Alice Springs	1970	T–6	
Ampilatwatja School	Ampilatwatja	Sandover	1982	T–12	
Angurugu School	Angurugu (G. Eylandt)	Arnhem	1943	T–12	
Areyonga School	Areyonga	Lasseter	1950	P–9	
Baniyala Garrangali School	Baniyala	Arnhem		T–11	
Barunga School	Barunga	Katherine		T–11	
Belyuen School	Belyuen	Top End		T–11	
Bonya School	Bonya	Sandover	1988	T–11	
Borroloola School	Borroloola	Gulf		T–12	
Bulla Camp School	Auvergne Station	Katherine		T–7	
Bulman School	Bulman	Katherine		T–11	
Canteen Creek School	Owairtilla	Barkly		T–11	
Douglas Daly School	DPIFM Research Farm	Top End	1982	1–6	
Dundee Beach School	Dundee Beach	Top End	1988	T–12	
Elliott School	Elliott	Barkly		T–10	
Epenarra School	Epenarra	Barkly		T–9	
Finke School	Aputula	Lasseter	1958	T–7	
Gapuwiyak School	Gapuwiyak	Arnhem	1988	T–12	
Gochan Jiny-Jirra School	Gochan Jiny-Jirra	Top End	1998	T–6	
Gunbalanya School	Kunbarllanjnja	Top End		T–12	
Haasts Bluff School	Haasts Bluff	Tanami	1960	T–7	
Harts Range School	Atitjere	Sandover	1988	T–9	
Jilkminggan School	Jilkminggan	Katherine	1975	T–12	
Kalkaringi School	Daguragu	Katherine	1976	T–11	
Kiana School	Kiana Station	Gulf			
Lajamanu School	Lajamanu	Tanami	1954	T–11	
Laramba School	Laramba	Tanami	1981	T–10	
Mamaruni School	Minjilang	Top End	1975	T–12	
Maningrida College	Maningrida	Arnhem	1958	T–12	
Manyallaluk School	Manyallaluk	Katherine	2005	1–6	
Mataranka School	Mataranka	Katherine	1968	2–10	
M'Bunghara School	M'Bunghara	Tanami		1–10	
Middle Point School	Middle Point	Top End	1964	T–6	
Milikapiti School	Melville Island	Top End		T–6	
Milingimbi School	Milingimbi	Arnhem	1925	T–12	
Milyakburra School	Bickerton Island	Arnhem		T–10	
Minyerri School	Minyerri	Katherine	1981	T–11	
Mount Allan School	Yuelamu	Tanami	1988	T–10	
Murray Downs School	Imangara	Barkly	1982	T–10	
mutit-s	Mutitjulu	Lasseter	1997	T–10	
Newcastle Waters School	Newcastle Waters	Barkly		T–6	
Neutral Junction School	Tara	Barkly		T–10	
Nganmarriyanga School	Nganmarriyanga	Top End	1987	T–12	
Ngukurr School	Ngukurr	Katherine	1988	T–12	
Ntaria School	Hermannsburg	Lasseter	1985	T–12	
Nitjpurru School	Bunbidee	Katherine			
Numbulwar School	Numbulwar	Arnhem		T–12	
Nyangatjatjara College - Kaltukatjara (Docker River) Campus	Yulara	MacDonnell	1997	T–10	
Nyangatjatjara College - Imnpa Primary/Secondary Campus	Yulara	MacDonnell	1997	T–10	
Nyangatjatjara College - Mutitjulu Campus	Yulara	MacDonnell	1997	T–10	
Nyirrpi School	Nyirrpi	Tanami	1985		
Papunya School	Papunya	Tanami	1981	T–12	
Peppimenarti School	Peppimenarti	Top End		T–12	
Pine Creek School	Pine Creek	Katherine		T–6	
Pularumpi School	Melville Island	Top End	1968	T–6	
Ramingining School	Ramingining	Arnhem		T–12	
Robinson River School	Robinson River Station	Gulf		T–10	
Rockhampton Downs School	Wogayela	Barkly		3–6	
Shepherdson College	Galiwin'ku (Elcho)	Arnhem		T–12	
Stirling School	Stirling Station	Barkly		1–7	
Ti-Tree School	Ti-Tree	Tanami	1981		
Timber Creek School	Timber Creek	Katherine		T–8	
Tipperary Station School	Tipperary Station	Top End	1981	T–4	
Titjikala School	Titjikala	Lasseter		T–7	
Urapunga School	Urapunga	Katherine	1975	T–11	
Wallace Rockhole School	Wallace Rockhole	Lasseter		T–6	
Walungurru School	Kintore	Tanami		T–6	
Warrego Primary School	Warruwi	Top End		T–6	
Warruwi School	Warruwi	Top End		T–12	
Watarrka School	Amunturrngu	Tanami		T–6	
Watiyawanu School	Amunturrngu	Tanami		T–6	
Willowra School	Willowra	Tanami		T–11	
Woolaning School	Woolaning	Top End		T–6	
Woolianna School	Woolianna	Top End	1998	T–11	
Wugularr School	Beswick	Katherine		T–12	
Yarralin School	Walangeri	Katherine		T–11	
Yirrkala School	Yirrkala	Arnhem		T–12	
Yuendumu School	Yuendumu	Tanami	1974	T–12	
Yulara School	Yulara	Lasseter	1984	T–11	

=== Other state schools ===
This includes special schools (schools for children with disabilities) and schools for specific purposes.

Name	Suburb	LGA	Opened	Years	Ref
Acacia Hill School	Sadadeen	Alice Springs	1983	T–12	
Alice Springs School of the Air	Alice Springs	Alice Springs	1951	T–9	
Henbury School	Wanguri	Darwin	1983	7–12	
Katherine School of the Air	Katherine	Katherine	1966	T–9	
Nemarluk School	Ludmilla	Darwin	1986	T–6	

=== Defunct state schools ===
Name	Suburb	LGA	Opened	Closed	Ref
Alice Springs High School	Gillen	Alice Springs	1964	2009	
Arawerr School	Arawerr	Barkly			
Darwin Primary School	Darwin	Darwin	1956	1984	
Anzac Hill High School	Alice Springs	Alice Springs	1987	2009	
Hartley Street School	Alice Springs	Alice Springs	1930	1965	

== Private schools ==
=== Catholic schools ===
In the Northern Territory, Catholic schools are usually (but not always) linked to a parish. Prior to the 1980s, most schools were founded by religious institutes, but with the decrease in membership of these institutes, together with major reforms inside the church, lay teachers and administrators began to take over the schools, a process which completed by approximately 1990.

Schools are administered by Catholic Education Office, Northern Territory, which is administered by the Diocese of Darwin. Preference for enrolment is given to Catholic students from the parish or local area, although non-Catholic students are admitted if room is available.

Name	Suburb	LGA	Opened	Years	Ref
Holy Family Catholic Primary School	Karama	Darwin	1983	T–6	
Holy Spirit Primary School	Wanguri	Darwin	1979	T–6	
Ltyentye Apurte Catholic School	Santa Teresa	MacDonnell	1953	T–12	
MacKillop Catholic College	Johnston	Palmerston	2012	7–12	
Mother Teresa Catholic Primary School	Zuccoli	Palmerston	2018	T–6	
Murrupurtiyanuwu Catholic Primary School	Nguiu	Tiwi Islands	1912	P–6	
O'Loughlin Catholic College	Karama	Darwin	1987	7–12	
Our Lady of the Sacred Heart Catholic College - Bath Street Campus	Alice Springs	Alice Springs	1997	T–12	
Our Lady of the Sacred Heart Catholic College - Sadadeen Campus	Alice Springs	Alice Springs	1997	T–12	
Our Lady of the Sacred Heart Catholic College - Traeger Campus	Alice Springs	Alice Springs	1997	T–12	
Our Lady of the Sacred Heart Thamarrurr Catholic College	Wadeye	Victoria Daly	1941	T–12	
Sacred Heart Primary School	Woodroffe	Palmerston	1987	T–6	
St Francis of Assisi School	Humpty Doo	Litchfield	1997	T–6	
Saint Francis Xavier Catholic School	Nauiyu Nambiyu	Victoria Daly	1956	T–12	
St John's Catholic College	The Gardens	Darwin	1960	7–12	
St Joseph's Catholic College	Katherine	Katherine	1987	T–12	
St Joseph's Flexible Learning Centre	Alice Springs	Alice Springs	2012	7–12	
St Mary's Catholic Primary School	Darwin City	Darwin	1908	T–6	
St Paul's Catholic Primary School	Nightcliff	Darwin	1967	T–6	
Xavier Catholic College	Wurrumiyanga, Bathurst Island	Tiwi Islands	1932	7–12	

=== Independent schools ===
Name	Suburb	LGA	Category	Opened	Years	Ref
Alice Springs Steiner School	Ross	Alice Springs	Steiner	1996	T–9	
Araluen Christian College	Araluen	Alice Springs	Christian^{†}	1990	T–9	
Australian International Islamic College, Darwin	Berrimah	Darwin	Islamic	2022	T–6	
Dhupuma Barker	Gunyangara	East Arnhem	Anglican	2021	T–10	
Gäwa Christian School	Elcho Island	Tiwi Islands	Christian^{†}	2004	T–10	
Good Shepherd Lutheran College	Howard Springs and Palmerston City	Palmerston	Lutheran	1997	T–12	
Haileybury Rendall School	Berrimah	Darwin	Independent	2018	T–12	
Living Waters Lutheran School	Larapinta	Alice Springs	Lutheran	1987	T–6	
Mapuru Yirralka College	Mapuru	East Arnhem	Christian	2010	T–10	
Marrara Christian College	Karama	Darwin	Christian^{†}	1979	T–9	
Milkwood Steiner School	Berrimah	Darwin	Steiner	2021	T–8	
Nawarddeken Academy - Kabulwarnamyo Campus	Kabulwarnamyo	Arnhem Land		2015	T–7	
Nawarddeken Academy - Kunmayali Campus	Kunmayali	Arnhem Land		2021	T–7	
Nawarddeken Academy - Mamadawerre Campus	Mamadawerre	Arnhem Land		2019	T–7	
Nawarddeken Academy - Manmoyi Campus	Manmoyi	Arnhem Land		2021	T–7	
Nhulunbuy Christian College	Nhulunbuy	East Arnhem	Christian^{†}	1998	T–9	
NT Christian College	Marrara	Darwin	Christian	1987	10–12	
Palmerston Christian School	Marlow Lagoon	Palmerston	Christian^{†}	1988	T–9	
St Philip's College	Alice Springs	Alice Springs	Uniting	1965	7–12	
Sattler Christian College	Humpty Doo	Litchfield	Christian^{†}	1996	T–9	
SEDA College NT	Fannie Bay	Casuarina		2022	10–12	
The Essington School	Nightcliff	Darwin	Montessori	1990	T–12	
Tiwi College	Melville Island	Tiwi Islands	Independent	2007	T–12	
Yipirinya School	Ciccone	Alice Springs	Independent	1978	T–10	
Yirara College	Arumbera	Alice Springs & Kintore	Lutheran	1973	7–12	

† - A member of the "NT Christian Schools" association.

=== Defunct private schools ===
Name	Suburb	LGA	Category	Years	Opened	Closed	Ref
Catholic High School	Alice Springs	Alice Springs	Catholic	High	1983	1997	
Kormilda College	Berrimah	Darwin	Anglican/Uniting	High	1968	2017	
Darwin Adventist School	Malak	Darwin	Adventist	Primary	1973	2008	
Our Lady of the Sacred Heart College	Darwin	Darwin	Catholic girls	High	1972	1975	
Our Lady of the Sacred Heart School	Alice Springs	Alice Springs	Catholic	Primary	1938	1997	
Our Lady of Victories Primary and Boarding School	Pularumpi	Tiwi Islands	Catholic	Primary	1941	1965	
Pungajurruwu School	Wurankuwu	Tiwi Islands					
Saint Michael's School	Wudikapildiyerr	Victoria Daly	Catholic	Primary	2011		

== See also ==
=== Northern Territory ===
- School of the Air
- Homeland Learning Centre
- List of Homeland Learning Centres

=== Australia ===
- Australian Curriculum
- Education in Australia
- Lists of schools in Australia
