= Belyuen =

Belyuen may refer to the following places in the Northern Territory of Australia.

- Belyuen Shire, a local government area
- Belyuen, Northern Territory, a locality
- Belyuen School – see List of schools in the Northern Territory#Remote schools
