= Potosino =

Potosino is a demonym associated with San Luis Potosí City, San Luis Potosi, Mexico. It may refer to:

- Atlético Potosino, a football team
- Autódromo Potosino, a racecourse
- Club Deportivo Potosino, a sports club
- FC Potosino, a football team
- Instituto Potosino de Investigación Científica y Tecnológica, the San Luis Potosí Institute of Scientific Research and Technology
- Instituto Potosino Marista, a K-12 Marist Brothers school
