= Nyanga High School, Marist Brothers =

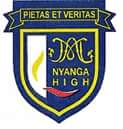
- Nyanga High School, Marist Brothers

Address
- Private Bag 2006 Nyanga; Manicaland; Zimbabwe
- Coordinates: 17.964976°S 32.739706°E

Information
- Type: Catholic Boarding high school
- Motto: Pietas Et Veritas (Latin: Duty and Truth)
- Established: 1962
- Grades: Form 1 - Upper Six
- Age: 12 to 19
- Enrollment: 500 - 600
- Color(s): Blue; Gold
- Yearbook: Marist Mirror
- Affiliation: Roman Catholic, Marist Brothers
- Website: www.nyangahighmarist.ac.zw

Nyanga High School, Marist Brothers also shortly known as 'Marist Nyanga', is a Catholic, independent, boarding, high school located in the Nyanga District of Zimbabwe’s Manicaland, 32 kilometres from Nyanga town. Marist Nyanga has a student population of about 550 pupils.

== History ==
In 2016, the school's quiz team won first place in National School Quiz Championship contest held in Johannesburg, with 23 schools from South Africa, Botswana, Zambia and Zimbabwe participating.

== Houses ==
Like most high schools in Zimbabwe, which follow the traditional British school system, students at Marist Nyanga are divided into four houses each having its own colour:

- Champagnat (Red), named after Saint Marcellin Champagnat, the founder of the Marist movement.
- Michael (Yellow), named after the Arch-angel Michael
- Patrick (Green), named after Saint Patrick
- Kizito (Blue), named after Brother Kizito, one of the first black Zimbabweans to join the Marist Brother order.

== See also ==
- List of schools in Zimbabwe
- List of boarding schools
- List of Marist Brothers schools
