= Engawala, Northern Territory =

Engawala
- Town
- Coordinates: 22°48′16″S 134°27′26″E
- Country: Australia
- State: Northern Territory

Population
  - Total: 164 (SAL 2021)
- Time zone: UTC+9:30 (ACST)
- Postcode: 0872

Engawala is a small town in the Northern Territory, Australia, located around 180 kilometres (110 mi) north of Alice Springs, in the Akityarre (or Anmatjere?) ward. Its altitude is 600 metres (2,000 ft).

It falls within the local government area of the Central Desert Regional Council (CDRC), and the governing land council is the Central Land Council. It also encompasses several family outstations: Mulga Bore, Angula, and Alatyeye.

== Demographics ==
In the 2021 Australian census, 164 residents were counted.

Engawala had a population of 154 at the 2016 census.

== Attractions ==
For tourists, there are several attractions:

- Engawala Arts Centre
- Outback Way Outdoor Art Gallery
- Gemtree Carvan Park and Gem Stone Fossicking

== Facilities ==
Facilities for residents include:

- CDRC office
- A library
- Community Safety Patrol
- Aged Care
- Youth Sport and Recreation program

== Outstations ==
It also comprises several family outstations: Alatyeye (a.k.a. Turners Camp), Angula (Angkola / Angkula) and Mulga Bore.

Mulga Bore, (Note: Not to be confused with Old Mulga Bore, a heritage-listed site in South Australia.) also known as Akaya, Akaye, Atartinga, and Athathenga, is a tiny family outstation, within the electorate of Barkly (longitude: 134.209, latitude: -22.451). The entire population, numbering around 70 people, are Mormons.
