= Nyangatjatjara College =

Location
- Yulara, Northern Territory; Australia; 25°13′43″S 130°58′17″E

Information
- Type: Independent co-educational secondary school
- Established: 1997; 29 years ago
- Specialist: Pitjantjatjara language
- Chairman: (2015)
- Principal: Mike Tucker
- Years: Foundation–12
- Campus: Yulara; Docker River; Mutitjulu; Imanpa
- Campus type: Suburban and Remote
- Affiliation: Association of Independent Schools of the Northern Territory
- Website: www.nyangatjatjaracollege.org.au

Nyangatjatjara College is an independent Anangu (Note: Anangu is the name used by members of several central Australian Aboriginal groups, roughly approximate to the Western Desert cultural bloc, to describe themselves) co-educational school located just outside Yulara, in the Northern Territory, Australia.

The College provides primary and secondary education for students in the region who speak Pitjantjatjara as their first language. The College has campuses in Docker River, Mutitjulu and Imanpa.

The College is a member of the Association of Independent Schools of the Northern Territory.

== See also ==
- List of schools in the Northern Territory
