= Colegio San José Maristas del Callao =

Location
- Av. Federico Fernandini 330; Santa Marina Sur, Callao; Peru; 12°3′22″S 77°7′40″W

Information
- Type: Private
- Religious affiliation: Catholicism
- Denomination: Marist Brothers
- Established: 1909; 117 years ago
- Director: Percy Villanueva Bonifacio
- Grades: K-12
- Gender: Coeducational
- Enrollment: 307 in secondary (2018)
- Website: www.sanjosemaristas.edu.pe

Colegio San José Maristas del Callao is a private Catholic primary and secondary school, located in Callao, in the Lima metropolitan area of Peru. The school is run by the Marist Brothers who began teaching in the area in 1909. In 2018 the secondary had 10 sections with 307 students.

== See also ==
- Education in Peru
- List of Marist Brothers schools
