= Marist Brothers Linmeyer =

Coordinates: 26°15′58.49″S 28°3′55.89″E

- East Street, Linmeyer; Johannesburg, South Africa

Information
- Type: Marist Brothers, Catholic
- Established: 1889; 137 years ago
- Principal: Tony Williams (Primary School), Lara-Ann Koch (High School)
- Gender: Coeducational
- Enrollment: 1,200
- Website: Marist Brothers Linmeyer

Marist Brothers Linmeyer (Marian College) is a coeducational school, pre-primary through high school, in Linmeyer, a suburb of Johannesburg, South Africa. Marist Brothers Linmeyer fosters purposeful inquiry-based and social-emotional learning from Grade 00 till Grade 12.

== History ==
The Marist Brothers established the first boys' school in Johannesburg on Koch Street in 1889. In 1966 the school moved from the heart of the town to the suburb of Linmeyer, Johannesburg. The primary and high schools have adjacent campuses and share the same sports fields.
