= Colegio Marista El Salvador =

Private school located in Manatí, Puerto Rico

Information
- Funding type: Private school
- Religious affiliation: Catholic
- Established: 1967; 59 years ago
- Website: maristamanati.org/home/

Colegio Marista Manatí is a private Catholic educational institution located in Manatí, Puerto Rico. The School is under the guidance of the Marist Brothers of the Province of Central America since its founding in 1967.

The School has been operating in its current location since 1967.
