= Instituto Maristas Valladolid =

Coordinates: 19°41′58.84″N 101°11′5.98″W

- Diego Jose Abad 250; 58000 Morelia, Michoacán, Mexico

Information
- Type: Marist Brothers, Catholic
- Established: 1941; 85 years ago
- Grades: Preschool through university
- Gender: Coeducational
- Website: MaristsValladolid

Instituto Maristas Valladolid was founded by the Marist Brothers in 1941. It includes divisions from preschool through the university level. It is located in Morelia (formerly Valladolid), Michoacán, Mexico.
