= Instituto Chacabuco =

Marist Brothers school in Los Andes, Chile

Coordinates: 32°49′47.86″S 70°35′42.16″W

- Av. Argentina 201, Los Andes, Chile

Information
- Type: Marist Brothers, Catholic
- Established: 1911; 115 years ago
- Director: Jessica María Torres Clark
- Staff: 83
- Gender: Coeducational
- Age range: Preschool through secondary
- Enrollment: 1,140
- Website: InstChacabuco

Instituto Chacabuco (Colegio Marista Los Andes) is a Marist Brothers school in Los Andes, Chile, preschool through secondary. It opened in 1911 at its present location on Argentina Avenue.

Chacabuco Institute, opened in 1911, was the original educational endeavor of the Marist Brothers in Chile. It was officially recognized by the Ministry of Education in 1929. The present location of the school goes back to the Assumptionists whose rectory, established in 1893, would become the first Marist school. The initial enrollment in 1911 was 80 students, but by year's end it had risen to 134.
