= Homeland Learning Centre =

Educational facilities in tiny remote settlements in the Northern Territory, Australia

Education in Remote Northern Territory (Australia)
Northern Territory Department of Education

General details
- Primary languages: English and Australian Aboriginal languages
- System type: Homeland and remote education

Enrollment (2023)
- Total: 400 in 31 Homeland Learning Centres

Homeland Learning Centres (HLC) are small primary and secondary educational facilities in remote Aboriginal communities in the Northern Territory of Australia, sometimes referred to as "homelands" or "outstations". HLCs operate through a hub-and-spoke model, in which a network of micro-schools is supported and administered by a central hub school. Most HLCs are operated by the Northern Territory Department of Education but are not classified as schools, differing from schools in their physical facilities, staffing, administration, and funding entitlements.

== History ==
In the 1970s, there was a significant migration of Aboriginal peoples in the Northern Territory away from larger communities, which had been based around church missions, to their traditional lands, a movement known as the Homelands movement. As these geographically dispersed homeland communities became established the Northern Territory Government developed education services to meet the needs of those dispersed communities, including what became known as Homeland Learning Centres (HLCs).

== Organisation ==
=== Location ===
HLCs are located across the Northern Territory, with most situated in the East Arnhem region. HLCs are generally located in very remote communities, some of which become inaccessible by road during the wet season.

=== Prevalence ===
The number of HLCs operating each year may vary due to population fluctuations and the movement of families between homelands. As of 2023, there were 31 HLCs in the Northern Territory. More than 90 homelands have had HLCs in the past, three of which were operated by the Catholic Education Office. The number of HLCs has generally declined due to closures and the upgrading of some HLCs to schools, e.g., the 2008 upgrade of Alparra and Baniyala (Yilpara).

Trend in the number of Homeland Learning Centres (HLCs)
Year	Number of HLCs	Ref
1995	53	
1997	55	
1998	54	
1999	54	
2000	55	
2001	50	
2002	54	
2003	55	
2004	53	
2005	53	
2006	51	
2007	46	
2008	45	
2009	46	
2010	40	
2011	38	
2012	39	
2017	27	
2018	45	
2019	29	
2020	32	
2022	44	
2023	31	

== Infrastructure ==
Infrastructure at some HLCs was rudimentary. It was not until the mid-2000s that many had been upgraded to generator-supplied electricity. Infrastructure deficiencies have persisted at some HLCs, with a 2025 study finding that little had been invested in infrastructure development or renewal at Gurrumuru, Gäṉgaṉ and Garrthalala for decades, describing them as 'single-room'-HLCs without air-conditioning.

== Students ==
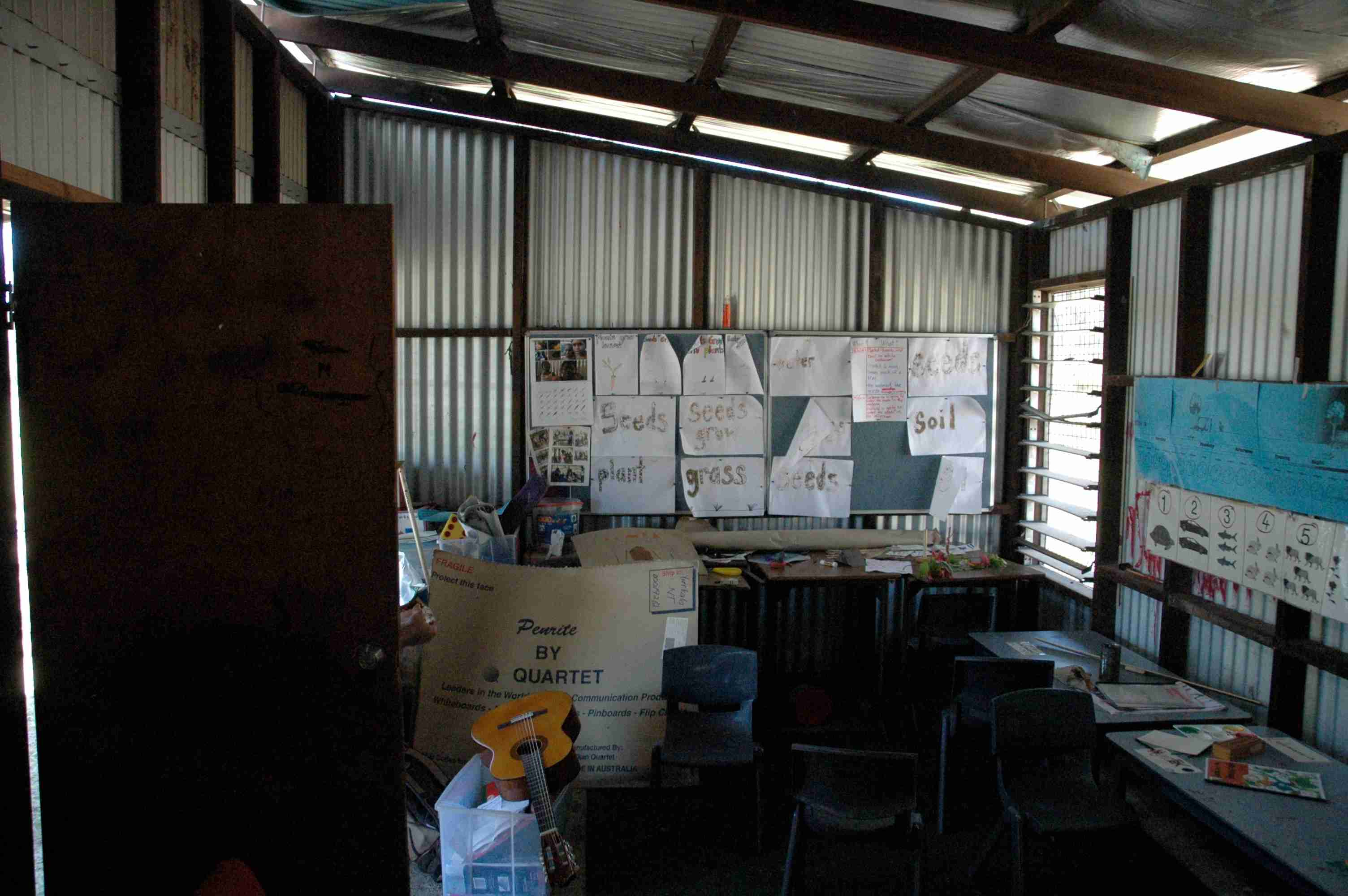
Rurrungala Homeland Learning Centre in 2009

HLCs deliver education services to small groups of students who cannot attend the central school in their area. In the case of the HLCs in the Laynhapuy Homeland School hub, HLCs operate with 6 to 35 students. HLC establishment and operation are based on the number of school-age students in a remote community, although implementation often varies significantly. School age was considered to be from four to seventeen years. Twelve school-age children entitle a community to an HLC; if the number drops below nine, the HLC is closed. According to the Education Department's Annual Report 2001–2002, "All Homeland Learning Centre students are assumed to be Indigenous". It has been noted that the NT Government had built HLCs for Indigenous students in very remote communities while building schools for non-Indigenous students.

== Staff ==
=== Permanent staff ===
HLCs do not have their own principal. They are the responsibility of a school principal who oversees a "hub" school within a larger community. Yirrkala Homelands School, however, has no hub school – its principal is responsible only for several HLCs in East Arnhem. HLCs also do not have full-time qualified teachers for their students, but are instead administered by the designated central school, which sends teachers to visit the HLCs on a regular basis. Qualified teachers visit HLCs from one to four days each week. Visiting qualified teachers are not present at HLCs for the full school day, due to time spent travelling to and from the HLC. In 2009, the NT Department of Education stated that it planned to "increase teaching by qualified teachers up to 5 or 6 hours per day in a virtual or face to face context".

=== Assistant teachers ===
HLCs are staffed by Indigenous Assistant Teachers. HLCs are entitled to one non-qualified "Assistant Teacher" for every 17 students, and a visiting (non-resident) qualified teacher for every 22 students. Assistant Teachers do not have teaching qualifications recognised by the Northern Territory Teacher Registration Board, or by other Teacher Registration Boards in Australia. Some Assistant Teachers have little or no English literacy or numeracy.

=== Pre-service teachers ===
The University of Melbourne's Graduate School of Education has partnered with Yirrkala Homelands School and the local public school at Yirrkala since 2011, involving self-funded practicum placements for pre-service teachers lasting two to four weeks. By November 2018, more than 60 student teachers had participated in placements in rural and remote settings, with some of the graduates returning to teach in NT schools.

== Teaching ==
=== Curriculum ===
Until 2003, Indigenous students of secondary school age at HLCs did not receive a secondary education – "HLCs offer a primary education only – i.e. no preschool or secondary". From 2003, secondary-age students at some HLCs followed the "post-primary" curriculum used in remote Indigenous schools. In the mainstream of the post-primary curriculum, secondary subjects, including humanities (such as history) and science (such as biology and physics), were either not included or studied only superficially. The inclusion of mathematics and English has been rudimentary, as evident in the Program Book that has been used in some HLCs:

Yirrkala Homelands School, Programme Book (2005)

Secondary English:

"Where Do We Want Secondary Students to Get To?

Speaking
- Construct own simple sentences
- Use some contractions, e.g. I'm, you're
- Give some basic personal information on request using learnt formulae e.g. My name is...
Reading
- Sequence a story by arranging pictures in order.
- Shows awareness of some common acronyms e.g. TV, VCR, DVD, etc...
Writing
- Use simple connectives e.g. but, then, and"

Secondary Mathematics:

"Where Do We Want Secondary Students To Get To?

- Recall or work out mentally, multiplication facts including 2x, 5x and 10x.
- Use digital and analogue clocks and calendars
- recognise, describe, draw and make a range of 2D shapes and 3D objects."

=== Both-ways pedagogy ===
Both-ways education, as originally conceptualised, refers to the formal inclusion of both Western and Indigenous knowledges in schooling, as well as a movement towards Indigenous control of education and self-determination.

== Teaching outcomes ==
Students at Homeland Learning Centres (HLCs) have the lowest English literacy and numeracy outcomes in Australia. When NAPLAN was introduced in 2008, its results showed that remote Indigenous students in the Northern Territory were not meeting national literacy and numeracy standards. Independent literacy testing conducted in October 2007 found that none of 29 students aged 5 to 17 in one homeland had progressed beyond Year 1 literacy levels.

== Funding ==
In May 2009, the NT government issued a policy statement on outstations/homelands, in which it stated: "Government will continue to provide support to larger outstations/homelands and homeland clusters through schools, homeland learning centres and residential models".

Studies indicate that despite the extreme need for HLC funding for infrastructure improvements, their designation as "Learning Centres" precludes them from benefiting from either recurrent funding entitlements or special-purpose grant opportunities, a hurdle often overcome when an HLC converts to a small school. A 2023 review of secondary education in the Northern Territory found that, of the $41.3 million invested between 2017 and 2021 in improving secondary student engagement, retention and completion, only 9% of students with high needs attended schools with access to targeted programs, compared with 83% of students with the lowest needs.

== See also ==
=== Northern Territory ===
- List of schools in the Northern Territory
- Minister for Education (Northern Territory)

=== Australia ===
- Australian Curriculum
- Education in Australia
- Lists of schools in Australia
