= Colegio Marista Pio XII =

Catholic school in Paraná, Brazil

Coordinates: 25°4′54.97″S 50°9′42.41″W

Location
- R. Rodrigues Alves, 701, Jardim Carvalho; Ponta Grossa, Paraná; Brazil

Information
- Type: Marist Brothers, Catholic
- Established: 1961; 65 years ago
- Director: Adilson José Janovski
- Grades: Preschool through secondary
- Gender: Coeducational
- Enrollment: 1230 (secondary 196)
- Website: PioXIIBrazil

Colegio Marista Pio XII (Marist College Pius XII) was founded in 1961 in Ponta Grossa, Brazil, by the Marist Brothers. It covers early childhood through secondary education, and emphasizes learning English throughout the years.
