= Istituto Champagnat, Genoa =

Coordinates: 44°23′42.92″N 8°58′28.78″E

- Via Caprera, 1A, 16146, Genoa, Italy

Information
- Type: Marist Brothers, Catholic
- Established: 1905; 121 years ago
- Director: Massimo Banaudi
- Grades: Preschool through secondary
- Gender: Coeducational
- Website: IstitutoChampagnat

Istituto Champagnat, Genoa is a school in Genoa, Italy. It was opened by the Marist Brothers in 1905. It educates students from preschool through regular and scientific secondary.
