= Externato Marista de Lisboa =

Coordinates: 38.7477°N 9.1816°W

- Rua Major Neutel de Abreu, 11, 1500-409; Lisbon, Portugal

Information
- Type: Marist Brothers, Catholic
- Established: 1947; 79 years ago
- Director: Luís Gonçalves
- Staff: 190
- Grades: Preschool through secondary
- Gender: Coeducational
- Enrollment: 1,350
- Website: MaristaLisbon

Externato Marista de Lisboa is a school opened by the Marist Brothers in Lisbon, Portugal, in 1947. It is coeducational and runs from preschool through secondary.
