= Colégio Marista de Carcavelos =

Coordinates: 38°41′32.12″N 9°20′40.02″W

- Colégio Marista de Carcavelos
- Lisbon, Portugal, Portugal; Portugal

Information
- Type: Parochial
- Established: 1965; 61 years ago
- Director: Carla Freitas
- Grades: Preschool through secondary
- Gender: Coeducational
- Enrollment: 1,700
- Website: https://marista-carcavelos.globaleduca.com/

Colégio Marista de Carcavelos is a school founded in Lisbon, Portugal, in 1965. Classes run from preschool through secondary school.
