= Instituto San Martín Curicó =

Coordinates: 34°59′19.78″S 71°14′19.86″W

- Carmen 241, Curicó, Chile

Information
- Type: Marist Brothers, Catholic
- Established: 1912; 114 years ago
- President: Jesús Pérez
- Rector: Jaime Inostroza Marín
- Grades: Preschool through secondary
- Gender: Coeducational
- Website: SanMartin

Instituto San Martín Curicó in Chile is a primary and secondary school founded by the Marist Brothers in 1912.

== Activities ==
Sponsored activities include workshops in theater, literature, crafts, music, ballet-dance, and plastic arts. The school also sponsors football, athletics, volleyball, basketball, table tennis, chess, and handball. In 2016 the San Martin boys' and girls' athletics teams and the boys' soccer team won the championship at tournaments organized by the University of Talca that bring together 64 teams.
