= Colegio Marcelino Champagnat =

Catholic school in La Pintana, Chile

Coordinates: 20.66751°N 101.36946°W

- Sixth Street Line 13540; La Pintana, Chile

Information
- Type: Marist Brothers, Catholic
- Established: 1983; 43 years ago
- Rector: Vicente Amurrio Silva
- Grades: Primary through Technical secondary
- Gender: Coeducational
- Formerly: Santa Rita de Casia (1983-88)
- Website: ChampagnatChile

Colegio Marcelino Champagnat in La Pintana, Chile, opened in 1983, and since 1988 has been run by the Marist Brothers. It currently offers basic and professional technical education, and is subsidized by the state.

== History ==
Santa Rita de Casia Basic School opened in 1983. The Marist Brothers acquired the school and an adjacent lot in 1987, giving the school its present name.
