= Alafua =

Coordinates: 13°51′S 171°47′W

Alafua is an urban village in the Faleata District in the Samoan capital of Apia.

Alafua had 1,347 residents according to the 2016 census. The village is home to the Samoan campus of the University of the South Pacific. It is also near the Robert Louis Stevenson School, which is a private school in the neighboring village of Lotopa located about one minute away from the village.

Many European families that migrated to Samoa are living in Alafua such as the Huffnagel, Arp, Wendt and Stünzner families. Alafua also has two high schools, which are St. Joseph's College run by the Marist Brothers and Don Bosco Tech run by the Salesian Fathers.

Also known to be an upper class suburban area because of the area not being like other Samoan villages having curfews and village leaders called Matais.

Religion in Alafua is mostly Christian at 98%, with 1% atheism and 1% other religions. Alafua only has one church meetinghouse, which belongs to the Church of Jesus Christ of Latter-day Saints (LDS Church).
