= Our Lady of the Sacred Heart Catholic College =

Coordinates: 23.703346°S 133.897003°E

- Alice Springs, Northern Territory; Australia

Information
- Type: Independent, co-educational, day school, Catholic (Marist)
- Motto: Justice, Love, Peace
- Established: 1938
- Colours: Maroon, Beige
- Website: www.olshalice.catholic.edu.au

Our Lady of the Sacred Heart Catholic College (often referred to as OLSH) is an Australian Marist Brother's Catholic School located in Alice Springs, Northern Territory, Australia. The college is a co-educational school split into three campuses: Transition to Year 4 (Bath Street Campus) Year 5 to Year 8 (Traeger Campus) Year 9 to Year 12 (Sadadeen Campus).

== History ==
Our Lady of the Sacred Heart Catholic College was first established by the missionaries of the Sacred Heart and the Daughters of Our Lady of the Sacred Heart in 1938. Bath Street Campus was the original primary school before the college expanded to a second site. Traeger Campus in 1992. With the Marist Brother's administration in Catholic High School that opened in 1983, the college expanded to a third site that catered secondary classes which is now known as Sadadeen Campus in 1997.

== Campus ==
OLSH College is split into three campuses from Transition to Year 12

- Bath Street Campus: Transition to Year 4, (Primary)
- Traeger Campus: Year 5 to Year 8 (Middle)
- Sadadeen Campus: Year 9 to Year 12 (Senior)
