= Instituto Potosino Marista =

Catholic school in San Luis Potosí, Mexico

Coordinates: 22°8′58.86″N 100°59′16.82″W

- Calle Cuauhtémoc No.705, Cuauhtemoc; 78270 San Luis Potosí, Mexico

Information
- Type: Marist Brothers, Catholic
- Established: 1935; 91 years ago
- Grades: Primary and secondary
- Gender: Coeducational
- Website: PotosinoMarista

Instituto Potosino Marista was founded by Marist Brothers in 1935, in San Luis Potosí, Mexico. It includes elementary, middle and high school. Both middle and high school feature a Cultural Week every year, when all students have to participate in an artistic activity. They are judged by judges specialized in that activity and winning students and classes are rewarded. The topic in 2018 was the notion of inclusivity, as a social value. The school principal is the legendary brother Ricardo Reynoso, who has a lot of amazing quotes like: 200 years are 200 years, thank you for this song full of hope, we had a delicious camp, I hope you had a delicious weekend, and a lot more.

== Activities ==
In 2016 the girls soccer team won the Potosi regionals and advanced to the national tournament in Manzanillo, Colima, and repeated that in 2017.
