= Linmeyer =

- Location within Gauteng Location within South Africa
- Coordinates: 26.262°S 28.070°E
- Country: South Africa
- Province: Gauteng
- Municipality: City of Johannesburg
- Main Place: Johannesburg
- Established: 1947

Area
  - Total: 1.21 km^{2} (0.47 sq mi)

Population (2011)
  - Total: 2,912
  - Density: 2,410/km^{2} (6,230/sq mi)

Racial makeup (2011)
  - Black African: 23.1%
  - Coloured: 6.2%
  - Indian/Asian: 5.7%
  - White: 62.9%
  - Other: 2.1%

First languages (2011)
  - English: 64.4%
  - Afrikaans: 11.9%
  - Zulu: 5.0%
  - Xhosa: 2.3%
  - Other: 16.4%
- Time zone: UTC+2 (SAST)
- Postal code (street): 2190
- PO box: 2105

Linmeyer is a suburb located in Region F of the City of Johannesburg Metropolitan Municipality, South Africa and overlooks the Klipriviersberg mountains to the south.

== History ==
The suburb was laid out in the late 1940s on land which previously belonged to the Meyer Farm. The first houses constructed were on South Rand Road, the first being owned by local pharmacist, Mr Levy. By 1950 roads had been laid out, many of their names reflecting the local history: Johan Meyer Street after the original owner of the farm, Risi Avenue after the developers Risi Investment. Development was slow during the late 1940s and by 1950 there were only five houses built. A construction company Phoenix Construction offered unique "off-plan" house for a price of some £SA3 000. A first batch of 3 homes built by Phoenix Construction were built in Risi Avenue – stands 240, 241, 242, which were ready for occupation by Christmas 1951. The rest of homes in that road were completed during 1951–1955. The roads remained unmade for many years owing to the bankruptcy of the construction company. They left behind half-dug storm water drains and a Fowler Steam Roller, which when occasionally fired up, provided great entertainment for the local children.
