= Outstation (Aboriginal community) =

Small, remote Aboriginal Australian community

An outstation, homeland or homeland community is a very small, often remote, permanent community of Aboriginal Australian people connected by kinship, on land that often, but not always, has social, cultural or economic significance to them, as traditional land. The outstation movement or homeland movement refers to the voluntary relocation of Aboriginal people from towns to these locations.

Within the Australian Indigenous context, outstation refers to remote and small groups of First Nations people who relocated for resistance, in the face of assimilation. This occurred predominantly in the 1970s – 1980s and was aimed at providing autonomy for Indigenous people opposing conformance. Oftentimes, these relocations were supported by government and overall wellbeing improvements for those who had relocated were able to be seen, demonstrating the importance of self-autonomy and a cultural connection to country. What started as a few small breakaway groups led into much larger outstation settlements. Many of these communities are now thriving as responsibility of the land and community has returned to traditional owners and cultural connections have improved. Outstations have also been referred to as homelands.

== Outstation movement ==
A movement arose in the 1970s and continued through the 1980s which saw the creation of very small, remote settlements of Aboriginal people who relocated themselves from the towns and settlements where they had been settled by the government's policy of assimilation. It was "a move towards reclaiming autonomy and self-sufficiency". Also known as "homelands", the term "outstation" was adopted as it "suggests a dependent relationship between the outstation and the main homestead, but with a degree of separation". Outstations were created by Aboriginal people who "sought... autonomy in deciding the meaning of their life independently of projects promoted by the state and market", and could be seen as a sign of remote Aboriginal Australians' attempt at self-determination. The underlying similarity among outstations is that the residents are living there by choice, sometimes because they wish to protect sacred sites and to retain connections to ancestral lands and ancestors, or because they wish to live off the land, or to escape social dysfunction prevalent in larger towns and communities (as later described in the Royal Commission into Aboriginal Deaths in Custody in 1991).

Government support for outstations has ebbed and flowed over time. During the 1970s and 1980s several groups moved from towns, missions and former Aboriginal reserves to smaller settlements on their traditional lands. Governments were supportive of the moves, seeing benefits in health and well-being, maintenance of culture and the preservation of connection to country, known to be of great significance to Aboriginal people. The policy of decentralisation came with moves towards self-determination and land rights, after it was realised that the earlier policies of assimilation had failed. For about 30 years, the Commonwealth government assumed responsibility for the outstations, despite a lack of underlying policy, and they grew in number, particularly in the Northern Territory.

There is a large diversity among the outstations: most comprise small family groups; a few have more than 100 people. Some are only seasonally or rarely occupied, and in most there is much movement of people between the outstations and larger centres. Some have or had thriving local economies based on arts centres, employment as Indigenous rangers, and harvesting plants and animals from nature, while others are dependent on welfare income.

== Terminology ==
Terminology has varied over time and by region. In a 2009 policy statement on homelands by the Northern Territory Government, it said:

Homelands is the preferred name for some, but not all, regions of the Territory. Outstations/homelands will be used as a generic description. Outstations or homelands will continue to be used interchangeably as appropriate to each location.

NT continues to use the term Homeland Learning Centres for a particular type of educational facility provided to the small communities.

== 1987 report ==
In 1987 an inquiry into "[t]he social and economic circumstances of Aboriginal people living in homeland centres or outstations, and the development of policies and programs to meet their future needs" was undertaken by the House of Representatives Standing Committee on Aboriginal Affairs, chaired by Allen Blanchard.

On 14 May 1987 the Committee tabled its report (the "Blanchard Report"), entitled Return to country: the Aboriginal homelands movement in Australia. It defined homelands as "small decentralised communities of close kin established by the movement of Aboriginal people to land of social, cultural and economic significance to them". It said that the definition of homelands should include:

- acknowledgement of the significance of Aboriginal peoples moving back to traditional country
- a clear distinction between homelands and settlements, missions or reserves;
- an acknowledgement of the traditional connection to the land and the ancestral spirits; and
- a description of the permanency of homelands as traditional home territory.

The Blanchard report gave formal recognition of the importance of outstations, giving 58 recommendations aimed at "improving the economic security and viability of outstations and increasing the level of services available to outstation residents". At this time the good effects of outstations on residents' quality of life and aspirations were recognised.

== 1990s–2000s ==
Funding the outstations proved extremely expensive, and as government ideologies changed, they were seen as wasteful of resources. Adequate health services were not provided and training and employment opportunities were not funded. By the 1990s the difficulties emerged with the decentralisation process: some services were extremely expensive to deliver to multiple tiny communities in remote places with few possibilities for economic self-sufficiency. From 1990, the outstations were largely funded via the Aboriginal and Torres Strait Islander Commission (ATSIC), which was established in 1990. Services were provided to outstations by small organisations based in a parent community known as an Outstation Resource Centre (ORA).

A review was commissioned by ATSIC in 1997, at which time there were about 12,000 Indigenous Australians living at about 1,000 outstations. It was intended to provide data that would reduce waste and improve efficiency, while supported by the commissioners who allocated funding. By this time, there had been a lot of criticism by politicians, and there were indeed many examples of waste, new houses built in uninhabited places, and suchlike. However, there were also thriving and well-run communities, and it was intended to review the funding of the ORAs, increase accountability and implement management techniques which would keep the elements of outstations which improved the lives of their residents. By this time, however, the costs associated with running the outstations were very high, and political will had dwindled. Recommendations were made on the assumption that ATSIC, or something similar, would continue.

From 2004 there was a major shift in both policy at both state and federal level with regard to funding outstations. John Howard abolished ATSIC in 2005, after saying a year earlier that "the experiment in elected representation for Indigenous people has been a failure". In September 2007, during the Northern Territory National Emergency Response ("The Intervention"), the Howard government gave responsibility for outstations back to the Territory. By this act, the chronic underfunding was continued. The NT developed a new policy, contained in a framework called "Working Future", published in May 2009. The policy targeted delivery of support and services to 20 larger Aboriginal communities in the NT, to be called "Territory Growth Towns", which would benefit from federal funding. This ended the 20-year commitment to support homelands following the Blanchard review in 1987.

By 2009, there were 560 small communities, mostly inhabited by fewer than 100 people scattered across the NT. They are nearly all located on Aboriginal-owned land, which covers about 500,000 km^{2} (190,000 sq mi).

In May 2009, the Northern Territory Government issued a policy statement on outstations/homelands, in which it stated that it: "values the contribution of outstations and homelands to the economic social and cultural life of the Territory...". The policy outlined new service delivery processes, and "introduce[d] a new disbursement model based on a more realistic framework for the allocation of limited government resources... consistent with [federal] Government policy on remote service delivery". It said that it would continue to support current outstations, where residents reside for a minimum of 8–9 months a year, and where there was an adequate supply of fresh drinking water, but residents must "commit to increasing self-sufficiency". While it was not opposed to Aboriginal people creating new remote communities, they would have to be self-funded. It would continue to support Homeland Learning Centres and schools.

The Australian Human Rights Commission's Social Justice Report for 2009, submitted by the Aboriginal and Torres Strait Islander Social Justice Commissioner Tom Calma, devoted a chapter to "Sustaining Aboriginal homeland communities". After outlining the definitions of and criteria for successful homelands and the history of the homelands movement, it criticised the government's withdrawal of funding, saying that "if government policies fail to support the ongoing development of homelands it will lead to social and economic problems in rural townships that could further entrench Indigenous disadvantage and poverty". In 2009. about 81% of Northern Territory's Indigenous people lived in remote or very remote communities.

The report recommended:

In order to implement the UN Declaration on the Rights of Indigenous Peoples, particularly Articles 3, 11, 12, 20 and 21, that the Australian and Northern Territory Governments commit to:

- Review the Working Future policy with the active participation of representative leaders from homeland communities;
- Develop and implement future homeland policies with the active participation of leaders from homeland communities; and
- Provide funding and support for homeland communities in all states and territories through the COAG National Indigenous Reform Agreement and associated National Partnership Agreements.

== 2010s ==
According to NT politician Alison Anderson in 2013, there were 10,000 people living on 520 homelands, representing about 25 per cent of the remote Indigenous population of the NT, in about 2,400 dwellings. She spoke of the benefits of the homelands, "in health and wellbeing and social harmony". She said that her government reaffirmed the integral role of the homelands in the Territory, and were committed to providing homelands residents with the same services as other residents of the NT, "within reason".

In December 2014, the Government of Western Australia under Colin Barnett announced that it would cease funding 150 remote communities because it lacked the funds.

As of 2018, there were about 1,200 outstations in Australia, and seen as significant for the maintenance of culture, language and relationships, thus contributing to health and well-being.

== Present and future ==
Individual small communities continue to exist, although not described as outstations because they are not part of a federal or other program that advocates "the homeland ideal"; "settlements" is the more usual term these days. They survive on one-off grants for such things as Indigenous business enterprise or environmental protection (Indigenous Protected Areas), private contributions by their residents, or royalties from mineral exploration on their land.

As of September 2020 there were around 500 homelands in the Northern Territory, which include 2,400 residences housing about 10,000 people. The Northern Territory Government delivers services via its Homelands Program by funding service providers who provide housing maintenance, municipal and essential services. However, there was concern that many remote schools and other services were under-funded, and a review of the policy, previously revised in 2015, had not been completed by November 2020. While the NT government remains committed to supporting the homelands, which had been shown to enhance educational outcomes for Aboriginal people, the funding source for the future remained unclear. In 2015, the then Chief Minister of the Northern Territory, Adam Giles, agreed that his government would take "full responsibility" for delivering services to homeland, in exchange for A$155 million paid out as a once-only payment.

In October 2021, the NT Government asked the federal government to speed up its program of home construction and upgrades, as housing in some homelands such as Emu Point was so derelict and overcrowded that residents were living in tents.

== Examples ==
Outstations mentioned in the Blanchard report include:

=== Northern Territory ===
Most outstations were/are in the Northern Territory.

- Kaltukatjara (Docker River)
- Ntaria (Hermannsburg)
- Maningrida
- Utopia (Urapuntja and Amengernterneah)

=== Queensland ===
- Various communities, near Aurukun, Weipa, Doomadgee and on Mornington Island

=== South Australia ===
- Pipalyatjara
- Mimili
- Kaltjiti (used to be known as Fregon)
- Pukatja (used to be known as Ernabella)

=== Western Australia ===
- Warmun Community (Turkey Creek)
- Balgo
- Halls Creek
- Warakurna
- Wanarn

== See also ==
- Animal Management in Rural and Remote Indigenous Communities (AMMRIC)
- Homeland Learning Centre
- Homeland Movement, 1989 studio album by Yothu Yindi
- Native title in Australia
