= Maningrida College =

School in Maningrida, Northern Territory, Australia

Coordinates: 12°03′02″S 134°13′24″E

Maningrida College is an early education through upper secondary (senior high) school in Maningrida, Northern Territory. As of 2017 120 employees work for the school. Maningrida College is also a remote education provider for surrounding areas.

It first opened as a remote education provider in 1958. At first the institution had a single instructor.
